= 30 Rock season 7 =

30 Rock
- Season 7
- DVD cover
- Starring: Tina Fey; Tracy Morgan; Jane Krakowski; Jack McBrayer; Scott Adsit; Judah Friedlander; Alec Baldwin; Katrina Bowden; Keith Powell; Kevin Brown; Grizz Chapman; Maulik Pancholy; John Lutz
- No. of episodes: 13

Release
- Original network: NBC
- Original release: October 4, 2012 – January 31, 2013

Season chronology
- ← Previous; Season 6 Next → "30 Rock: A One-Time Special"

The seventh and final season of 30 Rock, an American television comedy series on the NBC network in the United States, began airing on October 4, 2012. 30 Rock was renewed for a seventh and final season of 13 episodes on May 10, 2012, to air on Thursdays at 8:00 pm. The hour-long series finale wrapped filming on December 19, 2012, and aired on January 31, 2013.

Alec Baldwin reportedly approached NBC and offered to cut his pay in order for 30 Rock to be renewed for a full seventh and eighth season. He stated the following (via Twitter) on October 4, 2012: "I offered NBC to cut my pay 20% in order to have a full 7th and 8th seasons of 30 Rock. I realize times have changed". The season received critical acclaim and drew 13 Primetime Emmy Award nominations, the most of any comedy series for the year 2013. It ultimately won two, including one for Tina Fey and Tracey Wigfield's writing for the series finale, "Last Lunch" and another for Outstanding Casting for a Comedy Series.

== Synopsis ==
Season 7 continues to develop the relationship between Liz and Criss (James Marsden), as the pair try for children and consider getting married. Meanwhile, Jack attempts to improve his future prospects at the company, first by trying to "tank" NBC and convince Kabletown CEO Hank Hooper (Ken Howard) to sell it, and later by plotting to discredit his granddaughter and future CEO, Kaylee Hooper (Chloë Grace Moretz). Ultimately, however, he begins to wonder if he is truly happy. Elsewhere, Tracy has found success with his new movie studio, which produces comedy films mostly starring African American actors, in similar fashion to Tyler Perry; Jenna prepares to marry her longterm boyfriend Paul (Will Forte), and Kenneth has started a relationship with Hazel (Kristen Schaal), unaware that she is using him to get her moment on TGS.

== Cast ==
Tina Fey portrays Liz Lemon, the head writer of a fictitious live sketch-comedy television series TGS. The TGS cast consists of two main actors. The lead actor is the loose cannon movie star Tracy Jordan, portrayed by Tracy Morgan. His co-star is the extremely narcissistic Jenna Maroney, portrayed by Jane Krakowski. Jack McBrayer plays the naïve, perpetually cheerful NBC page Kenneth Parcell. Scott Adsit acts as the witty and wise TGS producer, Pete Hornberger. Judah Friedlander portrays trucker hat-wearing staff writer Frank Rossitano. Alec Baldwin plays the NBC network executive Jack Donaghy. Donaghy's full corporate title for the majority of the season is "Head of East Coast Television and Microwave Oven Programming". Keith Powell plays the Harvard University alumnus and TGS staff writer James "Toofer" Spurlock. Katrina Bowden acts as writers' assistant Cerie Xerox. Other cast members include Grizz Chapman as Grizz Griswold, Kevin Brown as "Dot Com" Slattery, and John Lutz as J.D. Lutz. Maulik Pancholy returned to the main cast this season after having left the cast before season six. The cast for the season also featured recurring guest stars Kristen Schaal as Hazel Wassername, a new NBC page obsessed with making it in show business, and James Marsden as Criss Chros, Liz's boyfriend, and later husband.

=== Main cast ===
- Tina Fey as Liz Lemon (13 episodes)
- Tracy Morgan as Tracy Jordan (13 episodes)
- Jane Krakowski as Jenna Maroney (13 episodes)
- Jack McBrayer as Kenneth Parcell (13 episodes)
- Scott Adsit as Pete Hornberger (7 episodes)
- Judah Friedlander as Frank Rossitano (12 episodes)
- Alec Baldwin as Jack Donaghy (13 episodes)
- Katrina Bowden as Cerie Xerox (7 episodes)
- Keith Powell as James "Toofer" Spurlock (5 episodes)
- Kevin Brown as Walter "Dot Com" Slattery (7 episodes)
- Grizz Chapman as Warren "Grizz" Griswold (6 episodes)
- Maulik Pancholy as Jonathan (4 episodes)
- John Lutz as J.D. Lutz (7 episodes)

=== Recurring cast ===
- James Marsden as Criss Chros (4 episodes)
- Sue Galloway as Sue LaRoche-Van der Hout (3 episodes)
- Bethany Hall as Bethany (3 episodes)
- Steve Higgins as Homonym host (3 episodes)
- Kristen Schaal as Hazel Wassername (3 episodes)
- Ken Howard as Hank Hooper (2 episodes)
- Adrienne C. Moore as various characters (2 episodes)
- Megan Mullally as Bev (2 episodes)
- Chris Parnell as Dr. Leo Spaceman (2 episodes)
- Subhas Ramsaywack as Subhas (2 episodes)

=== Guest stars ===
- Nina Arianda as Zarina (Episode: "Stride of Pride")
- Will Arnett as Devon Banks (Episode: "Game Over")
- Pat Battle as herself (Episode: "My Whole Life Is Thunder")
- Tony Bennett as himself (Episode: "Mazel Tov, Dummies")
- Richard Belzer as himself (Episode: "Hogcock!")
- Matthew Broderick as Cooter (Episode: "Governor Dunston")
- Steve Buscemi as Len Wazniak/Jan Foster (Episode: "Game Over")
- Don Cheadle as himself (Episode: "Unwindulax")
- Gary Cole as Roger (Episode: "Unwindulax")
- Bryan Cranston as Ron (Episode: "Governor Dunston")
- Jimmy Fallon as himself (Episode: "Governor Dunston")
- Will Forte as Paul L'astnamé (Episode: "My Whole Life Is Thunder")
- Judy Gold as herself (Episode: "My Whole Life Is Thunder")
- Salma Hayek as Elisa (Episode: "Hogcock!")
- Florence Henderson as herself (Episode: "My Whole Life Is Thunder")
- John Hodgman as Terry (Episode: "Mazel Tov, Dummies")
- Marceline Hugot as Kathy Geiss (Episode: "Last Lunch")
- Ice-T as himself (Episode: "Hogcock!")
- Cheyenne Jackson as Danny (Episode: "There's No I in America")
- Kermit the Frog as himself (Episode: "My Whole Life Is Thunder")
- Gayle King as herself (Episode: "My Whole Life Is Thunder")
- Jessica Leccia as Maria (Episode: "There's No "I" in America")
- Ryan Lochte as himself (Episode: "Stride of Pride")
- Kellan Lutz as himself (Episode: "Unwindulax")
- Rebecca Mader as Super-Hot Lady (Episode: "My Whole Life Is Thunder")
- Andrea Martin as Bonnie (Episode: "My Whole Life Is Thunder")
- Tim Meadows as Martin Lutherking (Episode: "Florida")
- John McEnroe as himself (Episode: "Game Over")
- Chloë Grace Moretz as Kaylie Hooper (Episode: "Game Over")
- Julianne Moore as Nancy (Episode: "Hogcock!")
- Conan O'Brien as himself (Episode: "Last Lunch")
- Catherine O'Hara as Pearline (Episode: "Governor Dunston")
- Paula Pell as Paula, Pete's wife (Episode: "Last Lunch")
- Nancy Pelosi as herself (Episode: "Hogcock!")
- Thomas Roberts as himself (Episode: "Governor Dunston")
- Al Roker as himself (Episode: "Last Lunch")
- Amy Sedaris as Visor Lady (Episode: "Unwindulax")
- Sue Simmons as herself (Episode: "My Whole Life Is Thunder")
- Octavia Spencer as herself (Episode: "My Whole Life Is Thunder")
- Elaine Stritch as Colleen Donaghy (Episode: "My Whole Life Is Thunder")
- Brian Williams as himself (Episode: "There's No "I" in America")
- Wendy Williams as herself (Episode: "My Whole Life Is Thunder")
- Dean Winters as Dennis Duffy (Episode: "Mazel Tov, Dummies!")

== Episodes ==
No. overall	No. in season	Title	Directed by	Written by	Original release date	Prod. code	U.S. viewers (millions)
126	1	"The Beginning of the End"	Don Scardino	Jack Burditt	October 4, 2012	701	3.46
Jack unveils his shockingly bad fall programming lineup for NBC, as part of his plan to "tank" the network and convince Kabletown CEO Hank Hooper (Ken Howard) to sell it. Jenna is preparing to get married and taps Liz to be her maid of honor, but Liz attempts to get out of it by employing Jack's "tanking" method and throwing Jenna a disastrous bachelorette party. Meanwhile, Kenneth and his new girlfriend Hazel (Kristen Schaal) invite Tracy to dinner at their apartment. However, unbeknownst to Kenneth, Hazel's real intention is to try to land a role in one of Tracy's new movies.
127	2	"Governor Dunston"	Robert Carlock	Robert Carlock	October 11, 2012	702	3.40
With the election approaching, Jack orders Liz not to do any political satire on TGS, given that it will likely boost ratings and set back his plan to "tank" the network. Liz agrees, but when a new Republican politician surfaces who looks exactly like Tracy, she changes her mind. Meanwhile, she attempts to spice up her love life with Criss (James Marsden), if the pair are to increase their chances of having a baby. Kenneth's mother (Catherine O'Hara) and stepfather (Bryan Cranston) visit, piquing the interest of Jenna, who is demoralized by the lack of profits from her summer dance hit and sees them as an opportunity to get in with a more traditional, CD-buying audience.
128	3	"Stride of Pride"	Michael Engler	Tina Fey	October 18, 2012	703	3.04
Liz has her hands full with the TGS stars as she attempts to disprove Tracy's claim that women aren't funny, and prevent Jenna from discovering that a recent magazine article has cited her age as "56". Meanwhile, Jack decides to try out an offbeat dating strategy; having a different girlfriend to entertain each side of his personality. However, he is shocked to discover that one of his girlfriends, Zarina (Nina Arianda), is doing the same to him.
129	4	"Unwindulax"	James E. Sheridan	Matt Hubbard	October 25, 2012	704	3.13
Jack invites Liz to attend a Republican Party fundraiser as his "chum", however he actually intends to use her as bait to convince the attendees to donate more money. Furious, Liz retaliates by using TGS to advocate voting for the Democratic Party instead. Meanwhile, the TGS writers mess with Jenna, after the release of her new tropical single gives her a reputation for being chilled out, and gains her a legion of like-minded fans.
130	5	"There's No I in America"	John Riggi	Josh Siegal & Dylan Morgan	October 31, 2012	705	3.38
After it emerges that Jenna's new legion of chilled out fans are crucial swing voters, Liz and Jack realize that she has the power to decide the outcome of the election, and go head to head to compete for her approval. Jenna is initially uninterested, but soon realizes that she has a unique opportunity to appoint a Jenna-friendly president. Meanwhile, Tracy helps Kenneth as he prepares to vote for the first time, and struggles to make his choice.
131	6	"Aunt Phatso vs. Jack Donaghy"	Don Scardino	Luke Del Tredici	November 15, 2012	706	3.34
Jack is annoyed when he discovers that he is the inspiration for the villain in Tracy's new Aunt Phatso movie. However, in order to launch a defamation of character lawsuit against Tracy, he must first prove that he isn't, in fact, as bad as his movie counterpart. Meanwhile, after Liz has surgery on her feet, Hazel (Kristen Schaal) sees an opportunity to scheme her way onto TGS and takes advantage of Liz by offering to take over some of her duties.
132	7	"Mazel Tov, Dummies!"	Beth McCarthy-Miller	Tracey Wigfield	November 29, 2012	707	3.61
After another pregnancy test comes back negative, Liz and Criss (James Marsden) consider waiting for a child to become available to adopt. However, when the pair later runs into Dennis Duffy (Dean Winters), they discover that he has been able to adopt sooner because he is married, and wonder if they should do the same. Tracy is horrified to learn from Dr. Spaceman (Chris Parnell) that for the first time in his life, he is in perfect health and will likely live to be old, prompting him to feel that he can no longer live as recklessly as he likes to. Jenna turns to Jack for advice after a man approaches her, claiming to have "won" her in a competition that was held many years ago.
133	8	"My Whole Life Is Thunder"	Linda Mendoza	Jack Burditt & Colleen McGuinness	December 6, 2012	708	3.22
Jenna is outraged that Liz has stolen her wedding thunder by getting married just as she was preparing to marry Paul (Will Forte). As a peace offering, Liz invites Jenna to an awards ceremony honoring women, but things get worse when Jenna attempts to upstage her by having her wedding there instead. Jack decides that in order to avoid disappointing his overly-critical mother Colleen (Elaine Stritch), who is visiting, he will do nothing at all during her visit. Tracy attempts to cheer up Kenneth, who is upset over losing his girlfriend, by introducing him to The Brady Bunch star Florence Henderson.
134	9	"Game Over"	Ken Whittingham	Robert Carlock & Sam Means	January 10, 2013	710	3.79
After Hank Hooper (Ken Howard) informs him that his granddaughter Kaylee (Chloë Grace Moretz) will inherit the role of CEO, Jack teams up with Lenny Wosniak (Steve Buscemi) and longtime nemesis Devon Banks (Will Arnett) in order to discredit her. Liz learns from her adoption referee, Bev (Megan Mullally) that there is a four-year waiting list to adopt a newborn, and that she may have to adopt an older child instead. Tracy finally meets his match when he attempts to direct Octavia Spencer in his new Harriet Tubman movie, and she proves to be very difficult.
135	10	"Florida"	Claire Cowperthwaite	Tom Ceraulo & Matt Hubbard	January 17, 2013	709	3.44
Liz and Jack travel to Florida in order to deal with Colleen's estate. However, once there, they make the shocking discovery that she had been in a lesbian relationship with her nurse, something which Jack refuses to accept. In Liz's absence, Tracy and Jenna assume control of TGS, but run into trouble when a lawyer (Tim Meadows) arrives to inform them that former employee Hazel (Kristen Schaal) has filed a lawsuit against the show.
136	11	"A Goon's Deed in a Weary World"	Jeff Richmond	Lang Fisher & Nina Pedrad	January 24, 2013	711	3.81
As she and Criss (James Marsden) receive notice that their adopted children will arrive at the airport in a few days, Liz's priorities are torn between helping him prepare and trying to save TGS from cancellation, as a result of the lawsuit. Meanwhile, Jack devises a plan to decide who the next president of NBC will be, but his efforts are hampered by Kenneth, whose love for the network dictates that he make sure the right person is chosen.
137	12	"Hogcock!"	Beth McCarthy-Miller	Jack Burditt & Robert Carlock	January 31, 2013	712	4.88
With TGS having been cancelled, Liz struggles to adjust to being a stay-at-home mother and craves to be back at work. Jack attempts to turn Kabletown into a perfect company, but begins to struggle with his growing realization that he isn't truly happy. Tracy has difficulty getting on without Kenneth, now that he has been promoted to president of NBC and can no longer run his errands. Jenna is mortified to learn that her diva tantrums are being ignored, now that nobody is contractually obliged to put up with her, so she decides to look for her next step as an actress.
138	13	"Last Lunch"	Beth McCarthy-Miller	Tina Fey & Tracey Wigfield	January 31, 2013	713	4.88
As she prepares for the final episode of TGS, Liz is faced with numerous problems: Jack has quit his job and looks to be on the verge of suicide; Tracy is doing everything in his power to stop the episode going into production, because he is due a payout from the network if it does not, and it's Lutz's turn to choose the writers' lunch, and he has seized upon it as an opportunity to pay them back for their years of picking on him. Meanwhile, network president Kenneth attempts to instill some genuine emotion in Jenna, as she prepares to perform her final song to close out the show.

== Reception ==
=== Critical reception ===
30 Rock's final season was widely acclaimed. On Rotten Tomatoes, the season has an approval rating of 95% with an average score of 8.6 out of 10 based on 38 reviews. The website's critical consensus reads, "30 Rock's final season is an excellent but bittersweet farewell to one of the most hilarious and incisive pop culture satires of its time." Alan Sepinwall, writing for HitFix, opined that "30 Rock isn't limping to the finish line like so many great sitcoms before it. It's been sprinting through this victory lap season, giving all of its characters happy endings [...] revisiting past gags, and making the series' end much harder to accept than if it had stayed a shadow of itself" and concluded that "30 Rock is one of the best comedies to ever appear on the medium it celebrated and mocked with equal measure, and it's going out with one of the best final seasons any comedy has ever had." Roth Cornet, writing for IGN, gave the season an "amazing" 9 out of 10 and commented that "The very best conclusions to stories take us by surprise, in this case make us laugh, and then settle into something that feels inevitable and right. 30 Rock did that." In conclusion, Cornet remarked that "Nothing is perfect, but I laughed hard, cried some and walked away as happy as I could have been with 30 Rock's inevitable end. What is perhaps more surprising, is that a series whose comedy hinged on being unhinged delivered honest life lessons that were as salty as they were sweet. Though never, never saccharine."

Nathan Rabin, writing for The A.V. Club, commented that "One of the great things about the seventh and [...] final season of 30 Rock is that it genuinely feels like an ending, and a very satisfying one at that. 30 Rock could coast on the goodwill generated by the knockout, surprisingly moving Liz Lemon wedding episode but it seems intent on regaining its former glory as it roars its way to a conclusion." He concluded that "After serving as the harried den mother to the 30 Rock gang all these years, Liz thoroughly deserves a happy ending of her own. The same is true of 30 Rock as a whole and this season feels like a send-off worthy to one of the best, most original comedies of the past twenty years." Daniel Goldberg of Slant Magazine awarded the season a 3.5 out of 4 and remarked "For a comedy whose bag of tricks is so transparent, it's gratifying to see that Fey hasn't written herself into a box."

=== Ratings ===
The seventh season premiere, "The Beginning of the End", drew 3.5 million viewers, both a significant decrease from the sixth-season premiere, "Dance Like Nobody's Watching" (4.5 million), and a significant increase over the sixth-season finale, "What Will Happen to the Gang Next Year?" (2.8 million). The third episode of the season, "Stride of Pride", was the lowest-rated in overall viewers, with 3.0 million tuning in, although it was not a series low, a position which continues to be held by the sixth-season episode "Nothing Left to Lose", which was seen by 2.8 million. Several episodes demonstrated season highs, with "Mazel Tov, Dummies!" drawing 3.6 million, and "Game Over" and "A Goon's Deed in a Weary World" drawing slightly below and above 3.8 million, respectively. These three episodes also, in turn, demonstrated the best overall viewership for 30 Rock since March 2012.

The series finale, the hour-long broadcast of "Hogcock!" and "Last Lunch", attracted an audience of 4.9 million, demonstrating another season high in overall viewers and an increase of two million viewers over the sixth-season finale. These two episodes were also the highest-rated of the series, in overall viewers, for two years. Overall, with the inclusion of DVR viewership, the season averaged 4.6 million viewers, even with the previous season. However, it ranked ninety-ninth for the year, against all other primetime network programming, a thirty-one place improvement over the sixth season.

=== Awards and nominations ===
On July 18, 2013, 30 Rock's seventh season received 9 nominations at the 65th Primetime Emmy Awards and 4 nominations at the 65th Primetime Creative Arts Emmy Awards (13 total, the most of any comedy series), including Outstanding Lead Actress in a Comedy Series for Fey, Outstanding Lead Actor in a Comedy Series for Baldwin, Outstanding Supporting Actress in a Comedy Series for Krakowski, Outstanding Guest Actor in a Comedy Series for Will Forte, Outstanding Guest Actress in a Comedy Series for Elaine Stritch, Directing, two nominations for Writing, and its seventh consecutive nomination for Outstanding Comedy Series, bringing the series' total number of Emmy nominations to 112. The series' casting directors won Outstanding Casting For A Comedy Series while Tina Fey and Tracey Wigfield won for their writing for the series finale, "Last Lunch".

At the 19th Screen Actors Guild Awards both Fey and Baldwin won for their performances in the Female and Male Comedy categories respectively, while the cast received a nomination for Outstanding Performance by an Ensemble in a Comedy Series.
