= Adrienne C. Moore =

American actress (born 1980)

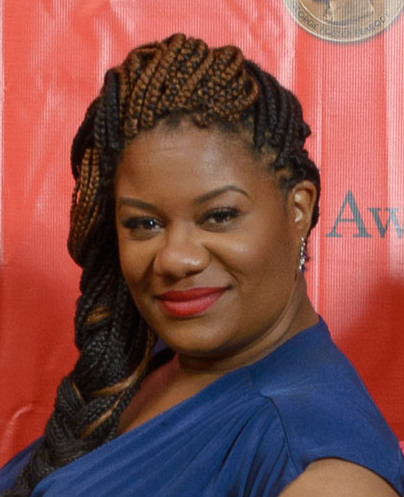
- Moore at the 2014 Peabody Awards
- Education: Northwestern University (BA)
- Occupation: Actress
- Years active: 2008–present

Adrienne C. Moore is an American actress. She is known for her role as Cindy "Black Cindy" Hayes in the Netflix comedy-drama series Orange Is the New Black (2013–2019).

== Early life ==
Moore grew up in Nashville and Georgia. Adrienne attended Benjamin Elijah Mays High School and graduated in 1999. She has a fraternal twin sister, Annette Moore, and an older brother, Wayne Moore Jr. In 2003, Moore graduated with a B.A. from Northwestern University, where she studied psychology, history, and religion.

== Career ==
She began her career on stage, appearing in Off-Broadway productions. On television, she had small parts in Blue Bloods and 30 Rock, before her role on Orange Is the New Black.

Moore is known for her role as Cindy "Black Cindy" Hayes in the Netflix comedy-drama series Orange Is the New Black. She was a recurring cast member in the first two seasons and was promoted to series regular for season 3. In 2014, Moore received her first NAACP Image Award nomination for her performance in the series. In 2015, Moore guest-starred in an episode of Law & Order: Special Victims Unit and the following year made her big screen debut in the biographical film The Lennon Report, about true events concerning the night John Lennon was shot and killed in 1980. She made cameo appearance as Black Cindy in an episode of Unbreakable Kimmy Schmidt in 2017, and co-starred in the action thriller film Shaft in 2019. In 2020, she had supporting role in the romantic comedy film, Modern Persuasion starring Alicia Witt.

In 2021 Moore began starring as Detective Kelly Duff in the CBC Television police comedy-drama series, Pretty Hard Cases. The series ended in 2023, after three seasons. For her performance, she received Canadian Screen Award for Best Leading Performance in a Drama Series nomination in 2023. She later was cast in the thriller film, Juror No. 2 directed by Clint Eastwood.

== Filmography ==
=== Film ===
Year	Title	Role	Notes
2016	The Lennon Report	Dr. Pamela Roberts	
2019	Shaft	Ms. Pepper	
2019	Curious George: Royal Monkey	Doris	Voice
2019	Wonder Woman: Bloodlines	Etta Candy	Voice
2020	Modern Persuasion	Denise Jones	
2024	Juror #2	Yolanda	

=== Television ===
Year	Title	Role	Notes
2012	Blue Bloods	Nurse	Episode: "Collateral Damage"
2012	30 Rock	Shanice	Episodes: "Governor Dunston" and "Mazel Tov, Dummies!"
2013–2019	Orange Is the New Black	Cindy "Black Cindy" Hayes	Recurring role (Seasons 1–2), Series regular (Season 3–7); 82 episodes
2015	Law & Order: Special Victims Unit	Cheryl McCrae	Episode: "Transgender Bridge"
2017	America's Next Top Model	Herself	Guest; Cycle 23, Episode: "And Action"
2017	Unbreakable Kimmy Schmidt	Black Cindy	Cameo; Season 3, Episode: "Kimmy Steps on a Crack!"
2018	Homeland	Rhonda	Season 7, Episode 10: "Clarity"
2021–2023	Pretty Hard Cases	Kelly Duff	Series regular; 32 episodes
2023	The Horror of Dolores Roach	Herself	Episode: "They Called Me Magic Hands"
2025	Poker Face	Miss Dee	Episode: "Sloppy Joseph"

=== Theater ===
Year	Title	Role	Venue	Ref.
2016	The Taming of the Shrew	Tranio	The Public Theater	
2019	For Colored Girls Who Have Considered Suicide / When the Rainbow Is Enuf	Lady in Yellow	The Public Theater	
2023	Black Odyssey	Alsendra Sabine	Classic Stage Company	
2024	The Blood Quilt	Gio	Lincoln Center Theater	

== Awards and nominations ==
Organizations	Year	Category	Work	Result	Ref.
Canadian Screen Award	2013	Best Leading Performance in a Drama Series	Pretty Hard Cases	Nominated	
Canadian Screen Award	2023	Best Leading Performance in a Comedy Series	Pretty Hard Cases	Nominated	
Canadian Screen Award	2024	Best Ensemble Performance, Drama	Pretty Hard Cases	Nominated	
NAACP Image Award	2015	Outstanding Supporting Actress in a Comedy Series	Orange is the New Black	Nominated	
NAACP Image Award	2017	Outstanding Supporting Actress in a Comedy Series	Orange is the New Black	Won	
Screen Actors Guild Award	2014	Outstanding Ensemble in a Comedy Series	Orange is the New Black	Won	
Screen Actors Guild Award	2015	Outstanding Ensemble in a Comedy Series	Orange is the New Black	Won	
Screen Actors Guild Award	2016	Outstanding Ensemble in a Comedy Series	Orange is the New Black	Won	
Screen Actors Guild Award	2017	Outstanding Ensemble in a Comedy Series	Orange is the New Black	Nominated	
