= My Whole Life Is Thunder =

- 30 Rock episode
- Episode no.: Season 7 Episode 8
- Directed by: Linda Mendoza
- Written by: Jack Burditt; Colleen McGuinness
- Production code: 708
- Original air date: December 6, 2012

Guest appearances
- Elaine Stritch as Colleen Donaghy; Will Forte as Paul L'Astnamé; Andrea Martin as Bonnie; Steve Whitmire as Kermit the Frog; Rebecca Mader as Super Hot Lady; Pat Battle as herself; Florence Henderson as herself; Gayle King as herself; Judy Gold as herself; Sue Simmons as herself; Wendy Williams as herself

Episode chronology
← Previous "Mazel Tov, Dummies!"	Next → "Game Over"
- 30 Rock season 7

"My Whole Life Is Thunder" is the eighth episode of the seventh season of the American television comedy series 30 Rock, and the 133rd overall episode of the series. It was directed by Linda Mendoza and written by Jack Burditt and Colleen McGuinness. The episode originally aired on NBC in the United States on December 6, 2012.

The episode received a positive critical response and was watched by 3.22 million viewers.

== Plot ==
Jenna is incensed that Liz's unexpected wedding the day before has upstaged her plans for a surprise wedding with fiancé Paul L'astnamé. As a peace offering, Jenna is invited to accompany Liz to a reception honoring the "80 Under 80" from an organization called Women in Media. Liz is one of the women who will receive an award at the reception. Jenna plans to get her revenge by disrupting the ceremony with a surprise wedding, but Liz is able to thwart her plan with unflattering stage lighting. Jenna eventually admits that she is having trouble adjusting to the new power balance in their relationship, as Liz has more success in her life. The award ceremony features cameos from Pat Battle, Judy Gold, Gayle King, Sue Simmons, and Wendy Williams.

Jack's mother (Elaine Stritch) comes to visit and continually warns him she will not live much longer, which annoys him. When she does in fact pass away during the visit, Jack deals with his grief by deciding to perform the greatest eulogy of all time. He is successful through the means of emotional stories, comedic anecdotes, a flute solo of Danny Boy, an unseen performance from Sir Paul McCartney and the Harlem Boys Choir, and a lesson on the afterlife from Kermit the Frog. Despite his success, the end of the service is interrupted by Jenna and Paul's surprise wedding. Jack allows it, as his mother would have hated it.

Kenneth tells Tracy he is upset that his girlfriend Hazel lost her job at TGS and then dumped him. Tracy tries to cheer Kenneth up by making life more like TV, where people never leave. This includes bringing in old TV star Florence Henderson. When Tracy "recasts" the "role" of Hazel with a new woman, Kenneth realizes how much his friend cares for him.

== Reception ==
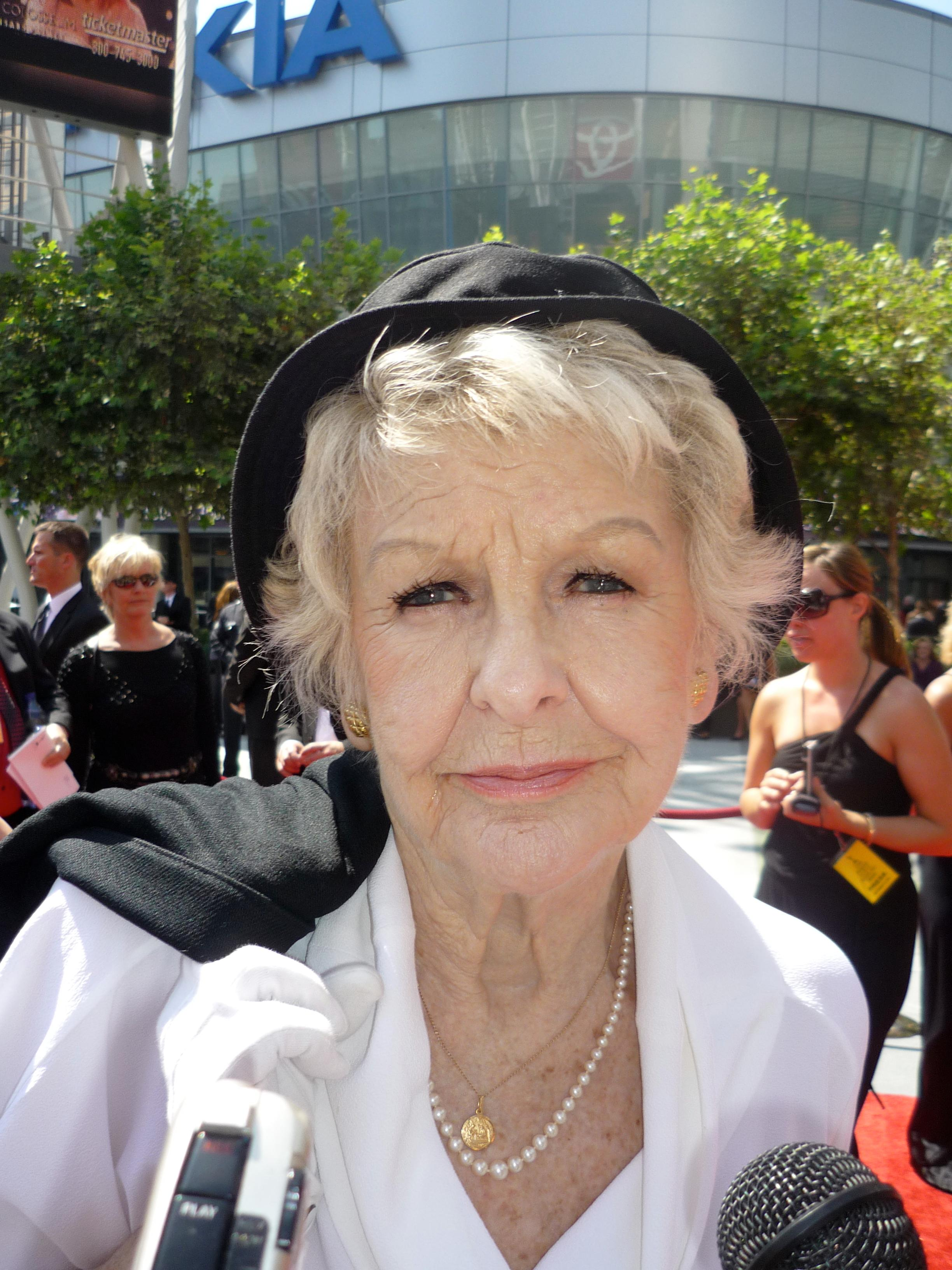
"My Whole Life Is Thunder" was Elaine Stritch's eighth and final appearance on the show, marking her inclusion in all seven seasons.

"My Whole Life Is Thunder" was watched by 3.22 million viewers and earned a 1.1 rating/3 share in the 18–49 demographic. This means that it was seen by 1.1 percent of all 18- to 49-year-olds, and 3 percent of all 18- to 49-year-olds watching television at the time of the broadcast. This was a decrease from the previous episode "Mazel Tov, Dummies!" (3.61 million).

"My Whole Life Is Thunder" received a highly positive response from critics. Pilot Viruet of The A.V. Club gave the episode an "A−" praising Jane Krakowski's performance as "flawless throughout the entire episode", and described the two other subplots involving Kenneth and Colleen as "funny yet poignant stories." Roth Cornet of IGN also gave the episode a positive review, stating "the irreverent, free-association humor continues to sing" and "there is a surreal tone to the series that helps it to stand out in a sea of generic and formulaic offerings." Amy Amatangelo of Paste magazine gave the episode an 8.9 out of 10, describing it as "the perfect Jenna venue" and highly praised the final appearance of Elaine Stritch as Colleen Donaghy, commenting "Stritch has been a wonderful recurring character on the show, and Colleen deserved this bittersweet final goodbye."
