= Game Over (30 Rock) =

- 30 Rock episode
- Episode no.: Season 7 Episode 9
- Directed by: Ken Whittingham
- Written by: Robert Carlock; Sam Means
- Production code: 710
- Original air date: January 10, 2013

Guest appearances
- Will Arnett as Devon Banks; Chloë Grace Moretz as Kaylie Hooper; Ken Howard as Hank Hooper; Steve Buscemi as Lenny Wosniak; Chris Parnell as Dr. Spaceman; Megan Mullally as Bev; Octavia Spencer as herself; John McEnroe as himself; Kellie Overbey as Doctor

Episode chronology
← Previous "My Whole Life Is Thunder"	Next → "Florida"
- 30 Rock season 7

"Game Over" is the ninth episode of the seventh season of the American television comedy series 30 Rock, and the 134th overall episode of the series. It was directed by Ken Whittingham and written by Robert Carlock and Sam Means. The episode originally aired on NBC in the United States on January 10, 2013.

The episode received a positive critical response and was watched by 3.79 million viewers.

== Plot ==
Hank Hooper (Ken Howard) informs Jack that he will be retiring as CEO on his upcoming seventieth birthday. Therefore, his granddaughter Kaylie (Chloë Grace Moretz) will take over when she graduates from college. Desperate, Jack meets with Lenny Wosniak (Steve Buscemi), who informs him that Kaylie has been hanging around with his old nemesis Devon Banks (Will Arnett). Jack meets with Devon and proposes that the pair work together to bring Kaylie down. Jack promises to give Devon a role within the corporation in return for his help. Devon agrees and reveals that he has discovered Kaylie is not a blood member of the Hooper family, but rather the daughter of the Pool boy. Jack sets out to prove this by inviting Kaylie to his office for a drink and taking the DNA from her glass.

Meanwhile, Liz calls her adoption referee, Bev (Megan Mullally), to find out whether her marriage to Criss has increased her chances at adopting a baby. To her dismay, Bev tells her that there is a four-year waiting list for a newborn, but that she can adopt a six-year-old straight away. Elsewhere, Tracy is shooting his new Harriet Tubman movie and has cast Octavia Spencer in the role of Tubman. She proves to be extremely difficult to work with, exhibiting many of the traits that Tracy does when working on TGS. After Grizz and Dot Com make Tracy realize that he is playing the Liz Lemon role, he decides to up the ante and begins dressing and acting like Liz. However, this just further exaggerates Octavia's Tracy-esque behavior.

Jack discovers from Kaylie's sample that she is indeed not a Hooper. He gives Devon the results to send to Hank. Kaylie turns the tables on him, however, revealing that Devon was a double agent. Furthermore, the glass was switched with another so that Jack was fooled into believing that Kaylie was not a Hooper. Jack first reacts in horror, but then reveals his true plan. He spent the entire week distracting Kaylie so that she would forget to give Hank anything for his birthday. He'd also fooled Devon, who had not mailed Hank the test results, but rather a birthday card from Jack. Kaylie is horrified to realize that Jack has beaten her and now stands in better favor with Hank than she does.

Finally, Tracy realizes that the trouble Octavia is giving him parallels the trouble he has given Liz for seven years. He applauds her ability to handle it so effectively. Liz then realizes that if she can spend seven years handling Tracy Jordan, she can handle an older child. She then decides to proceed with the adoption.

== Reception ==
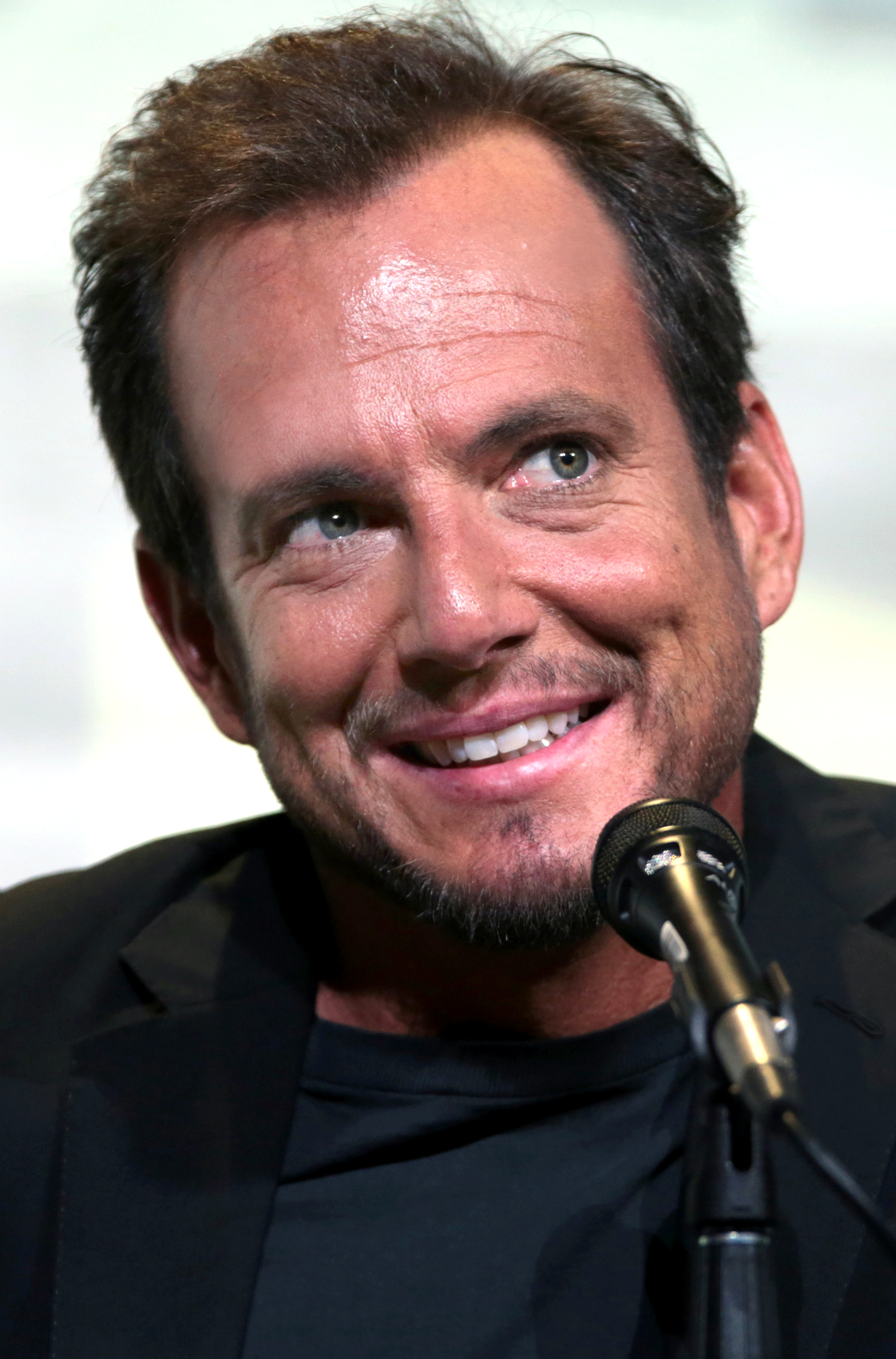
"Game Over" was Will Arnett's ninth appearance on the show as Devon Banks, marking his inclusion in all seven seasons.

"Game Over" was watched by 3.79 million viewers and earned a 1.5 rating/4 share in the 18–49 demographic. This means that it was seen by 1.5 percent of all 18- to 49-year-olds, and 4 percent of all 18- to 49-year-olds watching television at the time of the broadcast. This was a significant increase from the previous episode "My Whole Life Is Thunder" (3.22 million), and a season high in both the demographic and overall viewers.

"Game Over" received a very positive response from critics. Nathan Rabin of The A.V. Club gave the episode an "A−" and commented that "Watching 'Game Over' I found myself constantly freezing my DVR because the jokes were flying so fast and so furious that it was impossible to catch them all on the first viewing." In conclusion, he said that "this season feels like a send-off worthy to one of the best, most original comedies of the past twenty years." Roth Cornet of IGN particularly praised Tracy, opining "[he] has become a favorite of mine, and really seems to be ending the series with the most significant character arc. It is both satisfying and believable that he was able to come to at least some degree of self-recognition, though he will likely continue to be a lovable narcissist for the most part."
