= Stride of Pride =

- 30 Rock episode
- Episode no.: Season 7 Episode 3
- Directed by: Michael Engler
- Written by: Tina Fey
- Production code: 703
- Original air date: October 18, 2012

Guest appearances
- Nina Arianda as Zarina Sbarro; Ryan Lochte as himself

Episode chronology
← Previous "Governor Dunston"	Next → "Unwindulax"
- 30 Rock season 7

"Stride of Pride" is the third episode of the seventh season of the American television comedy series 30 Rock, and the 128th overall episode of the series. It was directed by Michael Engler and written by Tina Fey. The episode originally aired on NBC in the United States on October 18, 2012.

"Stride of Pride" was watched by 3.04 million viewers and received a positive response from critics.

== Plot ==
Liz (Tina Fey) must deal with a magazine article stating that Jenna (Jane Krakowski) is 56 and Tracy (Tracy Morgan) saying women are not funny. When Tracy goes as far as insinuating that even monkeys are funnier than women, Liz responds by reviving her own two-women show that she had with Jenna. Liz and Jenna's show makes Tracy laugh at what he thought was the joke of a female doctor (Liz) and a "sad old prostitute trying to look young" (Jenna), which Liz takes as a win.

Meanwhile, Jack (Alec Baldwin) discovers that his girlfriend Zarina (Nina Arianda) is using Ryan Lochte as a sex idiot. This is mirrored by Jack seeing another woman who is his sex idiot. When he notices that he is part of a group chat involving other people seen by Zarina, he realizes he fits the "father" archetype. A talk with Jenna encourages him to accept being the "older person" in the relationship and to enjoy the benefits that come with being perceived as old.

== Reception ==
"Stride of Pride" was watched by 3.04 million viewers and earned a 1.2 rating/4 share in the 18–49 demographic. This means that it was seen by 1.2 percent of all 18- to 49-year-olds, and 4 percent of all 18- to 49-year-olds watching television at the time of the broadcast. This was a decrease from the previous episode "Governor Dunston" (3.40 million).

"Stride of Pride" received mostly positive reviews from critics. Pilot Viruet of The A.V. Club gave the episode an "A−" and praised the episode's message, saying, “'Stride of Pride' succeeded because it wasn’t trying to give viewers an answer to the 'are women funny?' question; it was saying that it doesn’t owe anyone an answer in the first place." Amy Amatangelo of Paste magazine gave the episode a 9.5 out of 10, writing "Fey unabashedly and unapologetically took on the sexism and ageism that permeates Hollywood and society in the hilarious “Stride of Pride” episode of 30 Rock." However, Julia Bergen of TV.com gave the episode only moderate praise, stating, "Overall, I liked this episode, but I also didn't feel like I laughed all that much. It was a little preachy, and even though I agreed with its message, I could have done with a few more side-splitting jokes and a few fewer speeches about feminism."

== Cultural references ==
Tracy Jordan's tweet to "@theRealStephenHawking" which reads, "I agree @theRealStephenHawking. Women are not funny. Never have been. Never will be. #plotpoint" and Liz Lemon's subsequent response alludes to an incident sparked by a Vanity Fair article by Christopher Hitchens titled "Why Women Aren't Funny", which caused upset among Tina Fey, Sarah Silverman, Amy Poehler, and other female comedians who challenged the article as sexism.

When Zarina bumps into Jack while walking with her "sex idiot," Ryan Lochte, she introduces them by their first names, saying "Jack, Ryan; Ryan, Jack"—pronouncing "Jack, Ryan" with no vocal pause, such that it sounds very much like a single name. Jack Ryan is the name of Alec Baldwin's character in The Hunt for Red October, one of his first starring roles. The character “Ken Tremendous”, one of Zarina's “pokemon”, is based on the pseudonym of Michael Schur, the co-creator of Parks and Recreation. His email “kentremendous@fremulon.biz” is a reference to Schur's production company of the same name.
