= Hogcock! and Last Lunch =

"Hogcock!" and "Last Lunch"
- 30 Rock episodes
- The cast of 30 Rock, referencing the end of the fictional show TGS and the series itself
- Episode nos.: Season 7 Episodes 12 and 13
- Directed by: Beth McCarthy-Miller
- Written by: Jack Burditt (1); Robert Carlock (1); Tina Fey (2); Tracey Wigfield (2)
- Production code: 712 / 713
- Original air date: January 31, 2013

Guest appearances
- James Marsden as Criss Chros; Nancy Pelosi as herself; Richard Belzer as himself; Ice-T as himself; Julianne Moore as Nancy Donovan; Salma Hayek as Elisa Pedrera; Al Roker as himself; Conan O'Brien as himself; Paula Pell as Paula; Alice Ripley as herself; Dante Hoagland as Terry; Remy Bond as Janet

Episode chronology
← Previous "A Goon's Deed in a Weary World"	Next → "30 Rock: A One-Time Special"
- 30 Rock season 7

"Hogcock!" and "Last Lunch" are the two part series finale of the American television sitcom 30 Rock. They are the twelfth and thirteenth episode of the seventh season and the 137th/138th episode overall. The episode was directed by Beth McCarthy-Miller. "Hogcock" was written by Jack Burditt and Robert Carlock and "Last Lunch" written by series creator Tina Fey and Tracey Wigfield. The episode aired back-to-back as an hour-long episode on NBC on January 31, 2013. The episode featured several cameo appearance including news anchor Al Roker, Congresswoman Nancy Pelosi, and actress Alice Ripley.

In this episode, the cast and crew of TGS attempt to cope with the cancelation of the show and adjusting to their new lives. Liz Lemon (Fey) fails to adapt to her role as a stay-at-home mom, Jack Donaghy (Alec Baldwin) attempts to manage his position as CEO of Kabletown and attempting to achieve happiness. Kenneth Parcell (Jack McBrayer) struggles to adapt to his role of head of NBC, Tracy Jordan (Tracy Morgan) worries about how his friendships will be affected by the cancellation of the show.

Together, "Hogcock!" and "Last Lunch" received universal critical acclaim. According to Nielsen Media Research, the episodes were watched by 4.88 million viewers during their original broadcast, becoming 30 Rock's highest-rated episodes for two years. "Last Lunch" was nominated for four Primetime Emmy Awards: Outstanding Directing for a Comedy Series, Outstanding Writing for a Comedy Series, Outstanding Single-Camera Picture Editing for a Comedy Series, and Outstanding Original Music and Lyrics for "Rural Juror", ultimately winning one for Fey and Wigfield's writing. It has been listed as one of the greatest series finales in television history by numerous publications.

== Plot ==
With TGS having been cancelled, Liz struggles to adjust to being a stay-at-home mother and craves to be back at work. Jack attempts to turn Kabletown into a perfect company, but begins to struggle with his growing realization that he isn't truly happy. Tracy has difficulty getting on without Kenneth, now that he has been promoted to president of NBC and can no longer run his errands. Jenna is mortified to learn that her diva tantrums are being ignored, now that nobody is contractually obliged to put up with her, so she decides to look for her next step as an actress.

As she prepares for the final episode of TGS, Liz is faced with numerous problems: Jack has quit his job and looks to be on the verge of suicide; Tracy is doing everything in his power to stop the episode going into production, because he is due a payout from the network if it does not, and it's Lutz's turn to choose the writers' lunch, and he has seized upon it as an opportunity to pay them back for their years of picking on him. Meanwhile, network president Kenneth attempts to instill some genuine emotion in Jenna, as she prepares to perform her final song to close out the show.

=== Epilogue ===
One year later, Pete has faked his own death and started a new life, but is found by his wife; Liz is producing Grizz's new sitcom Grizz & Herz, and has taken her children to work; she has also stayed in touch with Tracy, whose father has finally returned from getting cigarettes; Jenna is attempting to steal a Tony Award from Alice Ripley; Jack's creation of the see-through dishwasher has led him to his lifelong dream job: CEO of General Electric, and he is still friends with Liz. In the distant future, an immortal Kenneth holds a snow globe (in a reference to the finale of St. Elsewhere, where it's implied everything that happened was the product of an autistic boy's imagination as he looked at a snow globe) containing a model of the Rockefeller Center as he listens in delight to Liz's great-granddaughter pitch for a show that will be based on the stories Liz had told her about working at TGS.

== Production ==
Beth McCarthy-Miller directed the episodes simultaneously.

The ending of the episode is an homage to the ending of St. Elsewhere.

== Reception ==
The hour-long broadcast of "Hogcock!" and "Last Lunch" was watched by 4.88 million viewers and earned a 1.9 rating/5 share in the 18–49 demographic. This means that it was seen by 1.9 percent of all 18- to 49-year-olds and 5 percent of all 18- to 49-year-olds watching television at the time of the broadcast. This represented a season high in total viewers and in the demographic, an increase of two million viewers over the previous season finale and the highest-rated episode of the series, in overall viewers, for two years. When data obtained from DVR viewers who watched the episode within seven days of broadcast was factored in, total viewership for the finale increased by 25 percent, to 6.13 million viewers, and viewership in the demographic increased by 37 percent, to a 2.6 rating.

=== Critical reception ===
The series finale received unanimous acclaim from critics and from fans of the series. Alan Sepinwall of HitFix opined that "the finale gave these ridiculous cartoon characters three dimensions for at least a few moments so they could say proper goodbyes to each other, and to us." He elaborated that "Liz and Tracy back at the strip club was a blunt but heartfelt summation of their whole relationship, and Jack on the boat giving a long preamble about the true nature of their friendship before saying that he loved Liz (which Liz spared him from actually having to do by saying it to him first) was a thing of beauty." In conclusion, he wrote that "[he would] miss this show, but this ending felt close to perfect." Roth Cornet of IGN gave the episode a 10 out of 10 and commented "30 Rock had the rare ability to provide both comedy and earned sentiment. That has never been more true than in these final two episodes" and concluded that "Jack goes back to his roots, his true-love, after a gloriously short-lived soul searching sea adventure: housewares. Liz, once and for all, embraces the fact that, yes, you can have it all, but "having it all" ultimately means truly knowing and accepting yourself, and having the willingness to compromise. And with that, a series that could have been an ingenious bit of comedy, but not much more, became a show about people and relationships that will stay with us well past the final fade to black tonight."

Pilot Viruet of The A.V. Club awarded the episode an "A" and singled out two scenes in particular as "perfect": "The first is Liz meeting Tracy at the strip club they visited in the pilot and, while admitting that it’s possible they won’t be friends after this, admitting she still does sincerely love him. The second scene is, if [sic] course, Jack’s suicide fakeout, which he staged as a way to prove that Liz Lemon would miss him in the future." Viruet concluded that "It’s a show whose impact will be seen in plenty of future sitcoms [...] and while it’s a shame to see it go, it’s great to see it go out on such a high note." Amy Amatangelo of Paste scored the episode a 9.3 out of 10 and opined that "It’s hard to create a series finale that will make every fan happy. But 30 Rock, which is going out still very close to the top of its game, came very close. There was so much to love about the episode: Liz’s frighteningly spot-on fights with the moms at Gothammoms.com. Jenna landing in LA, seeing the competition, and high-tailing it right back to New York. The show getting in a few last digs at NBC. Plenty of Grizz and Dot Com. What appeared to be the show’s real crew in the final TGS shot. The return of Jonathan. Tracy spelling out his name for Kenneth’s receptionist ("‘R’ as in the pirate noise, ‘A’ as in the Fonzie noise"). Jenna having actual feelings even when she can’t look in the mirror to confirm that she’s crying. Sure, I could have done without the Lutz demand for "Blimpies" as the last lunch, but I quibble."

James Poniewozik of Time commented that "In some ways, last week’s episode felt more like a finale, in that it put a period on several stories: Liz got her kids, TGS hit the end of its run, Jack got Kabletown and Kenneth became president of NBC. The last hour, on the other hand, was a goodbye–in a 30 Rock-ian meta sense, it was like the "one more episode" that TGS itself had to make, because we weren’t quite ready to stop" and added "And I’m glad we got that epilogue, because as neatly as the rest of this shortened final season wrapped up 30 Rock’s plotlines, this last hour captured its emotion." Tom Gliatto of People praised the episode as "one of the most delightful series wrap-ups [he could] remember" and added that "[the characters] were full of the sparkling, absurd liveliness that characterized the show at its best throughout seven seasons." He concluded that "With its endless supply of shiny, shapely little jokes, the show could feel like a wonderful salad served up without a bowl. You got tired of being showered with lovely microgreens. This time we got the bowl. It was a lovely burnished wood." Brian Lowry of Variety was slightly less favorable, commenting "The finale earns points for ambition and nostalgia. There are the obligatory celebrity cameos, some very clever lines, a nifty callback to the pilot, and a kicker that exhibits a real love for television a lot of the audience probably won't understand it. But the whole thing is a little too precious and yes, weird - frittering away too much time on the supporting players [...] before getting to the really good stuff."

== Bibliography ==
- Roe, Mike (2021). The 30 Rock Book (1st ed.). Abrams Books. ISBN 978-1419750441.
