= Florida (30 Rock) =

- 30 Rock episode
- Episode no.: Season 7 Episode 10
- Directed by: Claire Cowperthwaite
- Written by: Tom Ceraulo; Matt Hubbard
- Production code: 709
- Original air date: January 17, 2013

Guest appearances
- Tim Meadows as Martin Lutherking; Kristen Schaal as Hazel Wassername; Ken Howard as Hank Hooper; Megan Mullally as Bev; Lynda Gravátt as Martha

Episode chronology
← Previous "Game Over"	Next → "A Goon's Deed in a Weary World"
- 30 Rock season 7

"Florida" is the tenth episode of the seventh season of the American television comedy series 30 Rock, and the 135th overall episode of the series. It was directed by Claire Cowperthwaite and written by Tom Ceraulo and Matt Hubbard. The episode originally aired on NBC in the United States on January 17, 2013.

The episode received generally positive critical reviews and was watched by 3.44 million viewers.

== Plot ==
Liz and Jack are both torturing themselves. Liz because a conversation with Tracy has made her feel like she isn't exciting and spontaneous enough, and Jack over his mother's sarcastic and condescending final words, that she only wanted him to be "happy". The pair travel to Florida to settle his mother's estate, but receive a shock when her live-in nurse Martha (Lynda Gravatt) speaks of what a kind and loving person she was. This is something that contradicts everything Jack knew about her. Jack asks Liz to poke around. She discovers that the pair had shared a bedroom and had the walls adorned with pictures of the two of them together, which indicates that they were in a lesbian relationship. However, when Liz attempts to relay this to Jack, he refuses to believe her. He dismisses their bed-sharing as being perfectly normal between two friends.

Meanwhile, Tracy and Jenna have been left in charge of TGS and quickly run into trouble when a lawyer, Martin Lutherking (Tim Meadows), arrives to tell them that Hazel (Kristen Schaal) has filed a multimillion-dollar lawsuit against the show. The suit cites inappropriate behavior by most of the staff. He explains that Hazel regularly sues shows that she has been sacked from, therefore, all they need to do is get everybody on the crew to sign an affidavit to deny that there has been any inappropriate behavior. The only holdout is Kenneth, who, having already lost his page job and his girlfriend in the past year, doesn't want to also lose his integrity by lying. Tracy and Jenna are uninterested and tell him to sign anyway, which he reluctantly does.

In Florida, Martha makes up a double bed for Liz and Jack, having mistaken them for a married couple. Liz sees an opportunity and challenges Jack to share the bed with her, as he is so determined that it had been perfectly ordinary between his mother and Martha. While the pair lie together, Liz wonders aloud why nothing has ever happened between her and Jack, as they have spent so much time together and there had been occasions in the past when they'd both gotten drunk together. Moreover, there were times where they were both on the rebound. She questions whether it was because she is uninteresting and unspontaneous, but Jack dismisses her, explaining that their half-friendship, half-mentorship is more interesting than a relationship would have been. The pair then get into an argument when Jack criticizes Liz for having made a visit to his late mother's house about herself.

At TGS, Kenneth begins acting strangely as a result of being forced to sell out his soul. Tracy and Jenna soon start to feel guilty. Eventually, they let him tell the truth. Kenneth explains to Lutherking all of the inappropriate things that have gone on at the show. Back in Florida, Jack rescues Liz from the police station at The Wizarding World of Harry Potter, where she gets into trouble trying to be spontaneous. She resigns herself to the fact that she'll never change. Jack counters this, admitting that his mother had been in a lesbian relationship with Martha. He says that if somebody like her could have a complete turnaround at eighty-five, so could Liz. Jack then realizes that his mother's last words, that he should be "happy", were not meant sarcastically, but wonders if he has fulfilled them. Liz reminds him that he has, as he's finally achieved his goal to become CEO, which was what he had always wanted.

Liz arrives back at TGS and receives a phone call from Bev (Megan Mullally) at the adoption agency. She is told that she can have two children right away, a brother and sister. Having wanted only one, Liz is taken aback. Ultimately, she decides to be spontaneous and agrees to adopt both of them. At that moment, Hank Hooper (Ken Howard) arrives at her office door. He informs Liz that as a result of the controversy Hazel's lawsuit has stirred up, his last act as CEO is to cancel TGS.

== Reception ==
"Florida" was watched by 3.44 million viewers and earned a 1.3 rating/4 share in the 18–49 demographic. This means that it was seen by 1.3 percent of all 18- to 49-year-olds, and 4 percent of all 18- to 49-year-olds watching television at the time of the broadcast.

"Florida" received generally positive reviews from critics. Alan Sepinwall, writing for HitFix, opined that "[it] wasn't necessarily one of the strongest episodes of this victory lap season of 30 Rock, in that I think there was probably an entire episode's worth of material in both stories, and having to split time made both feel only partially baked." However, he concluded that "the episode was packed with so many great throwaway jokes that I could just spend this review listing them all." Pilot Viruet of The A.V. Club gave the episode an A− and particularly enjoyed the scene with Liz and Jack in bed, commenting: "For many viewers, the sight of these two in bed together has been a long time coming, and 30 Rock plays it off flawlessly and with a few meta winks to the audience. Liz asks Jack "why didn’t anything ever happen between us?" [...] Jack puts it best, both to Liz and the audience, when he responds that their current relationship is more interesting than them dating." Roth Cornet of IGN scored the episode an 8.0 out of 10 and summarised "The show continues to deliver the wacky antics we desire, yet stay streamlined and propel the plot forward. What sometimes felt like an overly kinetic series of sketches and subplots in the early part of the season, has nicely coalesced into a push toward the sad, but inevitable, end."

Whitney Pastorek of Vulture was less favorable, giving the episode a 2/5 and commenting: "tonight’s 30 Rock served two purposes: to satisfy the shippers who always wanted Jack and Liz to sleep together, and to explain why TGS — and thereby this entire series — would soon be coming to an end. Truthfully, neither resolution was entirely satisfying. After last week’s volley of one-liners and intrigue, this week’s [episode] landed like a lead balloon". Dan Forcella of TV Fanatic was positive, scoring the episode a 3.5/5 and commenting: "There were a few good Tracy bits along the way - asking Tim Meadows what kind of dinosaur his grandfather was, and saying that because he was a lawyer in a movie he knows all about winning your son's love back thanks to a magic camera come to mind - but it wasn't a laugh-heavy episode overall. That doesn't mean that it wasn't a good installment. They didn't try very hard for guffaws, which is surprising for 30 Rock, but is also better than attempting and failing all half hour long."
