= Great News =

American sitcom television series

- Genre: Sitcom
- Created by: Tracey Wigfield
- Starring: Briga Heelan; Andrea Martin; Adam Campbell; Nicole Richie; Horatio Sanz; John Michael Higgins
- Composers: Jeff Richmond; Giancarlo Vulcano
- Country of origin: United States
- Original language: English
- No. of seasons: 2
- No. of episodes: 23

Production
- Executive producers: Tina Fey; Robert Carlock; Tracey Wigfield; David Miner; Beth McCarthy-Miller; Jack Burditt (season 1)
- Producers: Sam Means; Amy Hubbs; Franco Bario; Briga Heelan; Andrea Martin
- Camera setup: Single-camera
- Running time: 22 minutes
- Production companies: Little Stranger, Inc.; Bevel Gears; Big Wig Productions; 3 Arts Entertainment; Universal Television

Original release
- Network: NBC
- Release: April 25, 2017 – January 25, 2018

Great News is an American sitcom television series created and written by Tracey Wigfield, and executive produced by Wigfield alongside Tina Fey, Robert Carlock, and David Miner for 3 Arts Entertainment, Little Stranger and Universal Television. The series premiered April 25, 2017 on NBC. It received positive reviews from the critics, praised for its cast and "subversive humor".

On May 11, 2017, NBC renewed Great News for a second season of 13 episodes, which premiered on September 28, 2017. On May 11, 2018, NBC canceled the series after two seasons.

== Premise ==
The series, set in the world of television news, follows an up-and-coming news producer who finds herself dealing with a new intern: her mother.

== Cast and characters ==
=== Main ===
- Briga Heelan as Katherine "Katie" Wendelson, a segment producer at The Breakdown who suddenly has to deal with the presence of her mother Carol, who is hired as an intern at the show
- Andrea Martin as Carol Wendelson, Katie's mother and an intern at The Breakdown
- Adam Campbell as Greg Walsh, an executive producer at The Breakdown and Katie's boss and love interest
- Nicole Richie as Portia Scott-Griffith, co-anchor of The Breakdown
- Horatio Sanz as Justin, video editor at The Breakdown
- John Michael Higgins as Chuck Pierce, co-anchor of The Breakdown who was once a well-respected network anchor

=== Recurring ===
- Tracey Wigfield as Beth Vierk: the meteorologist for The Breakdown
- Sheaun McKinney as Wayne: a cameraman for The Breakdown
- Brad Morris as Gene: one of the segment producers on The Breakdown
- Stewart Skelton as Dave Wendelson: Katie's father and Carol's husband, whose face is always partially obscured
- Vicki Lawrence as Angie Deltaliano: Carol's best friend
- Sarah Baker as Joyce Vickley: a human resources employee who comes in contact with The Breakdown staff
- Adam Countee as Chip: co-host of The Chip & Chet Report, a competitor of The Breakdown
- Dave Hill as Chet: co-host of The Chip & Chet Report, a competitor of The Breakdown
- Ana Gasteyer as Kelly: boozy co-host of Morning Wined Up, MMN's morning show
- Rachel Dratch as Mary-Kelly: boozy co-host of Morning Wined Up, MMN's morning show
- Christina Pickles as Mildred Marlock (season 1): the owner of MMN and Greg's grandmother
- Tina Fey as Diana St. Tropez (season 2): the new head of MMN
- Reid Scott as Jeremy (season 2): Katie's new boyfriend and a workaholic reporter for The New York Times
- Jim Rash as Fenton Pelt (season 2): the billionaire owner of Pelt Industries who sues MMN due to a story reported by The Breakdown

=== Guest ===
- Tommy Dewey as Trip ("War Is Hell")
- Robin Leach as himself and 'Pond Scum' co-host ("Carol Has a Bully")
- Chris Parnell as Gerald, Diana St. Tropez's assistant ("Squad Feud")
- Rev. Run as himself ("Honeypot!")
- Christopher McDonald as Len Archer ("Award Show")
- Cecily Strong as Jessica Mancuso ("Night of the Living Screen")
- Rashad Jennings as Carvell ("Pool Show")
- Will Sasso as Petey Pierce, Chuck's mid 30s son ("A Christmas Carol Wendelson")
- Judith Roberts as Grammy ("Love is Dead")
- Jayma Mays as Cat ("Catfight")
- Tim Meadows as Lawyer ("The Fast Track")
- Ray Liotta as himself ("Early Retirement")
- Nat Faxon as Anthony Lyon ("Early Retirement")

== Episodes ==
| Season | Episodes | Originally released | | Rank | Average viewership (in millions) |
| Season | Episodes | First released | Last released | Rank | Average viewership (in millions) |
|---|---|---|---|---|---|
| 1 | 10 | April 25, 2017 | May 23, 2017 | 112 | 4.15 |
| 2 | 13 | September 28, 2017 | January 25, 2018 | 135 | 3.53 |

=== Season 1 (2017) ===
| No. overall | No. in season | Title | Directed by | Written by | Original release date | Prod. code | US viewers (millions) |
|---|---|---|---|---|---|---|---|
| 1 | 1 | "Pilot" | Beth McCarthy-Miller | Tracey Wigfield | April 25, 2017 | 101 | 5.22 |
Local news producer Katie is upset that her boss, Greg, only assigns her soft news. A family friend's funeral inspires Katie and her smothering mother, Carol, to pursue their dreams. Katie goes over Greg's head to secure a lead story assignment from anchor Chuck, while Carol returns to school and secures an internship at Katie's station. Katie tries to get Carol fired by tricking her into upsetting temperamental Chuck; Carol proves uniquely adept at handling Chuck, but quits over Katie's behavior. Katie convinces Carol to return and, when the hurricane she is covering is downgraded, successfully crafts a new lead story about baby boomers returning to the workplace.
| 2 | 2 | "Bear Attack" | Beth McCarthy-Miller | Tracey Wigfield | April 25, 2017 | 102 | 4.26 |
Carol sabotages Katie's efforts to travel to the Central Park Zoo to cover an escaped bear, fearing the assignment is too dangerous. Carol realizes she has been projecting her own fears onto Katie and finally teaches her to ride a bike, enabling Katie to get an exclusive on the bear's subdual. In an effort to raise ratings, Greg insists that Chuck and Portia "banter" at the end of each newscast, but they have avoided socializing for years because they have nothing in common. Greg leads them to successfully discuss "lemonade;" Chuck is talking about the beverage and Portia is talking about the Beyoncé album.
| 3 | 3 | "Chuck Pierce Is Blind" | Claire Scanlon | Sam Means | May 2, 2017 | 103 | 3.70 |
Chuck has cataract surgery on both eyes, requiring him to break his perfect attendance record. To avoid showing weakness, he claims to be accepting an award and confides only in Carol, who finds the "mothering" task of caring for him easier than acquiring new skillsets to accomplish her intern tasks. Greg has long used Chuck's disapproval as an excuse to reject suggestions for The Breakdown, forcing him to now agree to everyone's outlandish ideas; he admits Katie is the only coworker he considers his peer as a professional. Greg and Katie lure Chuck back to the studio, but he is blind and, unaware of the changes, doesn't object to them. Greg deliberately behaves like Chuck, canceling the changes but also insulting the entire crew. Carol successfully uses the office's technology to get Chuck through the broadcast, though it is still disastrous.
| 4 | 4 | "War Is Hell" | Victor Nelli Jr. | Jack Burditt & Robert Carlock | May 2, 2017 | 104 | 2.63 |
Freelance photographer Trip (Tommy Dewey), Katie's secret boyfriend, returns from Syria. Carol, whose negativity Katie blames for previous breakups, discovers the relationship but likes Trip; Katie suspects Carol investigated him. Katie learns Trip is a wealthy heir, while Carol had learned his mother is deceased, enabling her to take over that role. Katie realizes her misgivings about Trip are her own, and she breaks up with him; he is disgusted by Katie and Carol's behavior, anyway. Chuck decides to prove his masculinity by field reporting from South Sudan, but Justin discovers Chuck is a coward, whose war zone footage is so embarrassing it drove his previous editor from the business. After Justin and Greg mock him, Chuck terrorizes them with firecrackers, exposing their own fears and purposefully earning a travel ban from HR.
| 5 | 5 | "Snowmageddom of the Century" | Payman Benz | Chrissy Pietrosh & Jessica Goldstein | May 9, 2017 | 105 | 3.55 |
The studio is snowed in. Dismayed by the lack of workplace friendships, Carol prompts socialization by distributing the morning show's wine. When the network requests a special report on the blizzard, the drunk crew pulls together to deliver a barely competent broadcast. Portia convinces Katie that Chuck's seemingly professional interest in her is romantic; Katie embarrasses herself and learns he was trying out ways to attract a young woman who works at his gym. An awkward attraction arises between Katie and Greg. Katie learns the "cat" Greg often refers to is his girlfriend, Catherine.
| 6 | 6 | "Serial Arsonist" | Ken Whittingham | Ben Dougan | May 9, 2017 | 106 | 2.76 |
Field reporter Kevin is exposed as a serial arsonist and the leader of a redhead-supremacist group. At Carol's urging, Katie accepts his job. Her first report goes well, but without Katie's production support Portia squanders an interview with a source Katie developed. Katie wants to return to her previous position, but her field reporting was so well received, Greg insists she continue. Katie realizes Carol and her friends made all the positive calls the network received. To prove to Carol that she is capable of achieving fame but uninterested, Katie disrupts her live shot to reprise a childhood pageant routine. Greg instead runs a new theme song Justin helped Chuck create to prove he could match Portia's outside pursuits. Carol realizes fame is her own dream, and Katie encourages her to pursue it. Greg lets Katie return to producing and hires a new field reporter, unaware he is secretly Kevin's follower.
| 7 | 7 | "The Red Door" | Beth McCarthy-Miller | Amy Hubbs | May 16, 2017 | 107 | 3.51 |
In Chuck's house, Carol finds his Madame Tussauds wax figure, which was mothballed after his fame declined. Giving up on his dreams, he tells her to destroy it. She instead hides it on the roof, resulting in the office believing Chuck will commit suicide. Carol admits that if Chuck doesn't have hope for the future, she fears she can't either. Chuck's coworkers inspire him with their heartfelt admiration, and are confused when he reveals himself after the dummy falls. Portia's phone is hacked, and a typo in a leaked email suggests Katie and Greg are having an affair. Learning that the crew views them both as sexless, they go overboard to portray themselves as sexual beings. Carol concludes from Katie's overreaction that she is attracted to Greg.
| 8 | 8 | "Celebrity Hacking Scandal" | Gail Mancuso | Dan Klein | May 16, 2017 | 108 | 2.68 |
An ambitious Carol successfully pitches a story on popular app Biscuit Blitz; Chuck mansplains the topic's insignificance to Portia, who is an expert on the game's relevance. He later apologizes, but fails to actually modify his behavior. Katie wants to investigate connections between recent celebrity hacks, but Greg criticizes her instincts and orders her to drop it; Katie leaves Carol to unsuccessfully oversee the Biscuit Blitz story and secretly meets with her source, who turns out to be a child. Katie reveals that Greg left England after incompetently producing a story on the Loch Ness Monster. Katie and Greg meet with the source, who is legitimate despite his youth and immaturity; he believes there is a data breach in an app. When Chuck is hacked after Carol installs Biscuit Blitz on his phone, Katie realizes the game is responsible and earns Greg's praise.
| 9 | 9 | "Carol Has a Bully" | Nisha Ganatra | Jack Burditt | May 23, 2017 | 109 | 3.11 |
After learning Carol only attended one class and is unprepared for her midterm, Katie sets aside Biscuit Blitz's financial documents to help Carol, who admits she fears failure. Katie is scooped by a rival network, but the hack is blamed on a fall guy. When Greg finally stands up to his overbearing and distant grandmother, network owner Mildred Marlock, she endorses him as future head of the news division. Carol fails the midterm; not wanting to show weakness, Greg fires her. Katie stands up for Carol, and Mildred fires Katie and retains Carol. Mildred orders the destruction of the financial documents.
| 10 | 10 | "Carol's Eleven" | Beth McCarthy-Miller | Tracey Wigfield | May 23, 2017 | 110 | 3.07 |
Mildred imposes changes on The Breakdown, displeasing the crew. Katie gives up on journalism; Carol tries to use "tough love" on her, but sees her as a child and coddles her. Katie discovers proof that Mildred owns Biscuit Blitz and orchestrated the hack. Greg admits he was wrong to fire her, and they confront Mildred, who threatens them. Carol tells Katie that she'll never succeed if she gives up. Supported by the entire crew, Katie and Greg create a false broadcast to distract Mildred, separately conduct a real broadcast to expose her, and trick her into incriminating herself on the air. The board of directors fires Mildred, saving everyone's jobs. When Greg and Katie nearly kiss, Greg claims it is a British custom; he kisses the entire crew. Katie tells Carol that she will always need her mother; they leave the office arm in arm.

=== Season 2 (2017–18) ===
| No. overall | No. in season | Title | Directed by | Written by | Original release date | Prod. code | US viewers (millions) |
|---|---|---|---|---|---|---|---|
| 11 | 1 | "Boardroom Bitch" | Beth McCarthy-Miller | Tracey Wigfield | September 28, 2017 | 201 | 5.15 |
Powerful executive Diana St. Tropez takes over The Breakdown. Katie asks Diana to mentor her; Diana declines but advises Katie to freeze her eggs in order to prioritize her career over family. Feeling threatened by Katie's admiration for Diana, Carol physically attacks Diana but ultimately realizes that her ideas have some merit. Katie and Greg agree not to pursue a relationship. Greg tells Katie she would be a worthy protégée; Katie is moved to confront Diana, who decides to mentor her because she is impressed that Katie has had any success after being raised by Carol. Diana introduces a panel format that earns record ratings, but Chuck is unable to get a word in edgewise against absurd, shouting pundits. Portia initially intends to let Chuck fail, but takes pity on him and introduces a topic he is comfortable with: "why change is bad."
| 12 | 2 | "Squad Feud" | Jeff Richmond | Ben Dougan | October 5, 2017 | 202 | 3.85 |
Diana encourages Katie to stand up for herself; when Katie demands to choose her own topic for a news story, Greg challenges her to executive produce an entire episode. Despite unanticipated challenges, Katie succeeds; Diana gives Katie Greg's job, but Katie turns it down, explaining that executive producing is not her goal; Katie wants to cover stories she cares about, and Greg agrees to accept her input on that. After Katie tells Carol about almost kissing Greg, Carol becomes obsessed with getting them together; emboldened by Diana's advice, Katie gets Carol to admit that Katie might know what's best for herself. After Diana and Portia appear together on a discussion panel and Diana insults Portia, they feud. Portia lures away Diana's chief of staff, Gerald, and Diana uses industry connections to remove Portia's social media followers. Perversely, Portia's mind is thus freed to "ideate" a solution: they will monetize the feud and share the profits; Diana acknowledges Portia's competence.
| 13 | 3 | "Honeypot!" | John Riggi | Tina Fey & Sam Means | October 12, 2017 | 203 | 4.23 |
Diana is promoted to COO of MMN's conglomerate parent company, which will take her overseas, and makes Katie senior associate producer. Diana suddenly subjects the staff to bizarre sexually charged harassment. Katie doesn't believe her coworkers' claims until Carol reveals she was made head intern only after cooperating with Diana's demeaning behavior. When the entire newsroom attempts to capture evidence of Diana's actions, she admits that she was trying to end her corporate career by receiving a golden parachute like male executives who behave inappropriately. She resolves to instead extend her professional success. Carol earns the respect of the very young interns by retrieving a balloon from the ceiling after decades of failed attempts by others.
| 14 | 4 | "Award Show" | Tristram Shapeero | Chrissy Pietrosh & Jessica Goldstein | October 19, 2017 | 204 | 3.78 |
The Breakdown is nominated for a journalism award, and Katie is also nominated for the Biscuit Blitz piece. Carol is excited, and Katie believes Carol is obsessing over the Biscuit Blitz nomination and will make a scene at the awards ceremony; to prevent Carol's attendance, Katie convinces Greg to disallow plus-ones (as interns weren't automatically invited), but Carol pays to become a seat filler. At the ceremony, handsome New York Times writer Jeremy belittles cable news to Katie, while Chuck ditches the Breakdown staff to sit with his old peers who never left their network television anchor positions. The Breakdown is assigned the worst table in the banquet hall. Chuck discovers the other anchors' inflexibility led to their irrelevance, and that his own working conditions are much better. Katie doesn't win her award, and she realizes Carol's excitement was for contributing to the show's nomination. When the Breakdown also doesn't win, both Katie and Chuck storm the stage to praise the show and their coworkers. Benjamin accepts Katie as part of the journalism community; they exchange business cards.
| 15 | 5 | "Night of the Living Screen" | Victor Nelli Jr. | Robert Padnick | October 26, 2017 | 205 | 4.00 |
Katie feels inferior to her high school friend Jessica, a married suburban mother who constantly boasts on social media. Katie spends all her money participating in Portia's jet-setting lifestyle so she can post photos of it, culminating in a disastrous and failed attempt to prove she attended an exclusive Halloween party, including pawning a family heirloom to purchase a costume that is destroyed. When Jessica offers condescending sympathy, Portia dissects Jessica's Instagram feed to prove that the content is fraudulent; Jessica admits that her life is miserable. Meanwhile, superstitious Catholic Carol fears Halloween. When she is assigned to teach Chuck to use The Breakdown's new interactive touchscreen, which he hates, Chuck enlists Justin to program the device so Carol will believe it's Satanically possessed and abandon the task; Chuck is later overcome with guilt, and teaches himself to use the screen in order to present an apology to Carol.
| 16 | 6 | "Pool Show" | Payman Benz | Hayes Davenport | November 2, 2017 | 206 | 2.61 |
Chuck bonds with Portia's football-playing fiance Carvell (who was suspended from the league for deflating the footballs, then filling them with helium), and the close bond formed by the two drives a wedge between both Portia and Chuck and Portia and Carvell. In an effort to help Portia "recapture the magic" in her relationship, Chuck shows her relationship videos in which he gave advice on matters of the heart. This results in Portia breaking up with Carvell, until Carvell learns about the videos, and when he takes issue with Chuck for having Portia watch those, the couple reconciles. Meanwhile, Carol, with a reluctant Greg in tow, spies on Katie and Jeremy, who are allegedly on a stakeout. Carol is pleased to see Greg clearly bothered watching the two together. Greg is forced to save the day to prevent Katie and Jeremy from being caught, then is comforted by Carol as Katie and Jeremy share a victory kiss.
| 17 | 7 | "A Christmas Carol Wendelson" | Maggie Carey | Amy Hubbs | December 21, 2017 | 207 | 2.65 |
When Carol's overzealous Christmas spirit and insistence that the staff help her decorate for the season leaves everyone, Katie especially, frustrated, Carol falls and hits her head, awaking to find herself in a "Christmas Carol" type dream wherein she is visited by the ghosts of Christmas Past, Present, and Future (portrayed by her two coworkers Portia and Gene and her friend Angie). She thereby learns to tone down her enthusiasm for the season, only to find that the staff has set up her Christmas decorations in the way she wanted, because they feel bad about how they originally responded to her request for help in doing so. Elsewhere, Chuck's estranged son, Petey, comes to visit him, and because the two do not get along, Katie is tasked with babysitting him. Her attempts to get the two to reconcile first result in Chuck endorsing a product Petey is selling on air, to which Petey reacts negatively because it "wasn't done right". Petey goads his father into a physical altercation, which ultimately leads to hugging and reconciliation between the two.
| 18 | 8 | "Sensitivity Training" | Tristram Shapeero | Mitra Jouhari | December 21, 2017 | 208 | 1.83 |
Chuck and Carol, tasked with attending sensitivity training (which Chuck has been through several times before), decide to teach the other "snowflakes" in the office a lesson, which results in all of the rest of them attending that training, which makes the two realize just how insensitively they have been acting. Elsewhere, as Katie and Greg work together, their mutual attraction flourishes, but because Katie is in a relationship with Jeremy, it doesn't get very far. When Portia suspects that Katie is just a sidepiece, and that Jeremy is seeing someone else, Katie endeavors to prove her wrong. She thereby learns that Jeremy is a workaholic, and when he in turn sees the same tendencies in Katie, the two break up.
| 19 | 9 | "Love is Dead" | Beth McCarthy-Miller | Robert Carlock & Sam Means | December 28, 2017 | 209 | 1.68 |
The Wendelsons face a double tragedy of the heart, as Katie, fresh off her breakup with Jeremy, is convinced that love is dead, while Carol discovers that her parents' more than half of a century of marriage has deteriorated, leading the two to split. Desperate to convince Katie that love is not dead, and that having the occasional "fling" is not enough, Carol also does everything in her power to get her parents back together. When she cannot do so, her mother ends up reconnecting with a high-school sweetheart with whom she had lost track. This is enough to convince both Katie and Carol that love never dies. Elsewhere, Chuck discovers the reason for Justin's newfound happiness is a cute barista at a coffee bar he frequents. At the risk of damaging his friendship with Justin, Chuck determines to compete with him for the affections of the women. The two are able to reconcile by the end of the episode through recognizing the woman is not right for either of them, and that their friendship is more important.
| 20 | 10 | "Catfight" | Claire Scanlon | Josh Siegal & Dylan Morgan | January 4, 2018 | 210 | 2.38 |
Frustrated by Katie and Greg's adorable office flirtation, Carol takes matters into her own hands, inviting Greg's girlfriend Cat (Jayma Mays) to come to the office and surprise him for his birthday, despite his assertions to the staff that he doesn't need or want them to make a big deal about it. The plan backfires when Cat proves to Carol how great she and Greg are for each other, and when everything she does convinces Carol that, though she is on "Team Katie" for everything else, she favors Cat over Katie for Greg. That in turn sends Katie into a jealous spiral as she accepts that she is attracted to Greg. A ray of hope emerges when Katie presents Greg with exactly what he wanted and needed, and is touched that she is so in tune with him.
| 21 | 11 | "Competing Offer" | Beth McCarthy-Miller | Ashley Wigfeld | January 11, 2018 | 211 | 2.31 |
Carol, realizing her career is going nowhere (as she has interned at MMN for over a year, which does not bode well for her desire to advance her career), begs Greg to hire her officially, which Greg refuses to do until she presents a competing offer to him. She indirectly motivates such an offer from Morning Wined Up, only to have Greg unable to counter it as The Breakdown is being named in a lawsuit, which ties up the organization's funds. In an effort to resolve the lawsuit, Diana St. Tropez orders Katie and Greg to fact-check a story on the billionaire suing them. It is revealed that the man behind this legal action has a personal grudge against Chuck and is out for revenge. Against Diana's orders, Chuck attempts to appease and reason with the man, who first demands that he deliver a humiliating apology to him over the airwaves, and, after that occurs, the man also demands that Chuck resign from the news forever. Faced with an impasse, Diana suspends Chuck indefinitely. Meanwhile, Katie, worried about being alone with Greg and determined not to make a move on her unavailable boss, asks Carol to ensure they are not left alone. When that occurs, Katie drinks milk, which makes her sick (as she is lactose intolerant). Greg assists Katie while she is throwing up, which leads the two to kiss. When Carol gives Greg an ultimatum to choose between Katie and Cat, Katie calls Carol out for interfering. Their explosive fight leads to Carol accepting the offer from "Morning Wined Up."
| 22 | 12 | "The Fast Track" | Jay Karas | Ben Dougan & Naomi Ekperigin | January 18, 2018 | 212 | 2.24 |
Katie, upset after her fight with her mother, and mad at Greg for his inability to act on the ultimatum Carol gave him, gives an impassioned speech about journalistic integrity to "rally the troops" against the man suing MMN. When that speech fails to inspire anyone except Chuck, who is hiding in her office, she agrees (against Greg's orders not to investigate) to team up with Chuck to bring down the person behind the lawsuit, only to find that his investigative skills are very rusty and out of practice. Elsewhere, Carol is upset to learn that her new opportunity at "Morning Wined Up" does not entail as much responsibility as she had hoped it would. When Katie figures out that the hosts of that program are making fun of Carol for their own amusement, she urges her to come back to MMN. Carol decides to quit instead, since she feels her dreams will never be taken seriously enough anywhere she works.
| 23 | 13 | "Early Retirement" | Beth McCarthy-Miller | Tracey Wigfield & Hayes Davenport | January 25, 2018 | 213 | 2.16 |
Diana St. Tropez reveals Fenton Pelt has agreed to drop the lawsuit on the condition that Chuck delivers a humiliating on-air apology and resigns from news forever. Chuck, defeated, agrees, until Portia reminds him why he got into journalism in the first place. Katie convinces Carol to join for one last job before her early retirement; thanks to Carol’s net of acquaintances in New Jersey, they successfully find Anthony Lion, Fenton Pelt’s former associate, survived after being shot by Fenton, who could disprove Pelt's claims and save the show. Due to a contractual condition, Chuck has the right to express his opinion about anything and without any limits during his final broadcast; thus, he manages to take time, until Carol, stimulated by Katie not to give up, convinces Anthony to confess on-air. With Anthony’s confession, “The Breakdown” successfully exposes Fenton, getting him to drop the lawsuit. Meanwhile, Cat breaks up with Greg, but Katie isn’t as happy as she thought she would be, because instead she wanted Greg to break up with Cat for her. At the end, Carol obtains a paid job at “The Breakdown” thanks to her relevance in dropping the lawsuit and thanks to Greg’s secret insistence, and Greg and Katie finally kiss.

== Reception ==
=== Critical response ===
Great News has received generally positive reviews from critics. On Rotten Tomatoes the series has an approval rating of 76% based on 33 reviews, with an average rating of 6.15/10. The site's critical consensus reads, "Great News overcomes its familiar trappings with gently subversive humor and a smart cast of talented, likable actors." On Metacritic, the series has a score of 67 out of 100, based on 21 critics, indicating "generally favorable reviews".

In 2018, Great News won the Gracie Award for Outstanding Comedy.

=== Ratings ===
==== Overall ====
Viewership and ratings per season of Great News
| Season | Timeslot (ET) | Episodes | First aired | | Last aired | | TV season | Viewership rank | Avg. viewers (millions) |
| Season | Timeslot (ET) | Episodes | Date | Viewers (millions) | Date | Viewers (millions) | TV season | Viewership rank | Avg. viewers (millions) |
|---|---|---|---|---|---|---|---|---|---|
| 1 | Tuesday 9:00 p.m. (1, 3, 5, 7); Tuesday 9:30 p.m. (2, 4, 6, 8); Tuesday 8:00 p.m. (9); Tuesday 8:30 p.m. (10) | 10 | April 25, 2017 | 5.22 | May 23, 2017 | 3.07 | 2016–17 | 112 | 4.15 |
| 2 | Thursday 9:30 p.m. (1–6, 9–13); Thursday 8:00 p.m. (7); Thursday 8:30 p.m. (8) | 13 | September 28, 2017 | 5.15 | January 25, 2018 | 2.16 | 2017–18 | 135 | 3.53 |

==== Season 1 ====
Viewership and ratings per episode of Great News
| No. | Title | Air date | Viewers (millions) |
|---|---|---|---|
| 1 | "Pilot" | April 25, 2017 | 5.22 |
| 2 | "Bear Attack" | April 25, 2017 | 4.26 |
| 3 | "Chuck Pierce Is Blind" | May 2, 2017 | 3.70 |
| 4 | "War Is Hell" | May 2, 2017 | 2.63 |
| 5 | "Snowmageddom of the Century" | May 9, 2017 | 3.55 |
| 6 | "Serial Arsonist" | May 9, 2017 | 2.76 |
| 7 | "The Red Door" | May 16, 2017 | 3.51 |
| 8 | "Celebrity Hacking Scandal" | May 16, 2017 | 2.68 |
| 9 | "Carol Has a Bully" | May 23, 2017 | 3.11 |
| 10 | "Carol's Eleven" | May 23, 2017 | 3.07 |

==== Season 2 ====
Viewership and ratings per episode of Great News
| No. | Title | Air date | Viewers (millions) |
|---|---|---|---|
| 1 | "Boardroom Bitch" | September 28, 2017 | 5.15 |
| 2 | "Squad Feud" | October 5, 2017 | 3.85 |
| 3 | "Honeypot!" | October 12, 2017 | 4.23 |
| 4 | "Award Show" | October 19, 2017 | 3.78 |
| 5 | "Night of the Living Screen" | October 26, 2017 | 4.00 |
| 6 | "Pool Show" | November 2, 2017 | 2.61 |
| 7 | "A Christmas Carol Wendelson" | December 21, 2017 | 2.65 |
| 8 | "Sensitivity Training" | December 21, 2017 | 1.83 |
| 9 | "Love is Dead" | December 28, 2017 | 1.68 |
| 10 | "Catfight" | January 4, 2018 | 2.38 |
| 11 | "Competing Offer" | January 11, 2018 | 2.31 |
| 12 | "The Fast Track" | January 18, 2018 | 2.24 |
| 13 | "Early Retirement" | January 25, 2018 | 2.16 |

== See also ==
- Room for Two, a 1990s sitcom with a similar premise that also ran for two seasons.
