= Governor Dunston =

- 30 Rock episode
- Episode no.: Season 7 Episode 2
- Directed by: Robert Carlock
- Written by: Robert Carlock
- Production code: 702
- Original air date: October 11, 2012

Guest appearances
- Matthew Broderick as Cooter Burger; James Marsden as Criss Chros; Bryan Cranston as Ron; Catherine O'Hara as Pearline; Jimmy Fallon as himself; Thomas Roberts as himself

Episode chronology
← Previous "The Beginning of the End"	Next → "Stride of Pride"
- 30 Rock season 7

"Governor Dunston" is the second episode of the seventh season of the American television comedy series 30 Rock, and the 127th overall episode of the series. It was written and directed by Robert Carlock. The episode originally aired on NBC in the United States on October 11, 2012.

"Governor Dunston" received a positive critical response and was watched by 3.4 million viewers.

== Plot ==
Liz (Tina Fey) continues with her plan of getting pregnant, while helping Jack (Alec Baldwin) with his plot to tank NBC by letting her writers write whatever they want for TGS, with the results being terrible sketches and low ratings. At Jack's request, she agrees not to write anything political, as that has raised their ratings in the past. Things are hindered when vice presidential candidate Paul Ryan drops out of the Presidential race (after being discovered to have been born in Kenya) and Mitt Romney replaces him with Governor Bob Dunston (Tracy Morgan) of Alabama. Dunston is a bumbling southern Republican with a striking resemblance to Tracy (Tracy Morgan). Liz comes under pressure from Pete and her writing staff to write sketches making fun of Dunston. At Jack's request, Liz promises not to write any political sketches making fun of Governor Dunston, but she eventually caves in to Pete and the writers' demands, yet manages to keep her promise by only quoting Dunston verbatim.

When TGS's sketches begin to receive tremendously high ratings, Kabletown CEO Hank Hooper orders the show to be broadcast five nights a week, thus requiring Liz to organize her life. Liz then realizes that organization is what was missing from her sex life and for the first time, she is eager to have sex with her boyfriend Criss (James Marsden).

Meanwhile, Kenneth (Jack McBrayer) is visited by his mother Pearline (Catherine O'Hara) and her "friend" Ron (Bryan Cranston), a kind, but somewhat dimwitted man. Kenneth's disdain for Ron is obvious, but it is accentuated when Ron accidentally reveals that he and Pearline have actually been married for seven years. However, when Kenneth overhears Jenna (Jane Krakowski) harshly insulting Ron, he becomes surprisingly defensive of him, stating that only family members can talk about one another in such a negative way. With this point, Kenneth realizes that he and Ron have truly been family for years. Kenneth them reluctantly shares an embrace with Ron.

Jack's plans for tanking the network are further complicated by a sudden visit from Republican lobbyist Cooter Burger (Matthew Broderick), his former Bush administration coworker. Cooter encourages Jack to make more sketches about Dunston, as they portray Dunston as a lovable buffoon rather than the controversial figure that he actually is. Ultimately, Liz and Jack are faced with a choice. They can either tank TGS and secure Jack's future at the expense of Liz's sex life, or continue the sketches and preserve Liz's chances of having a baby and increase Romney's chances of winning the Presidency. Liz decides to continue the sketches.

== Reception ==
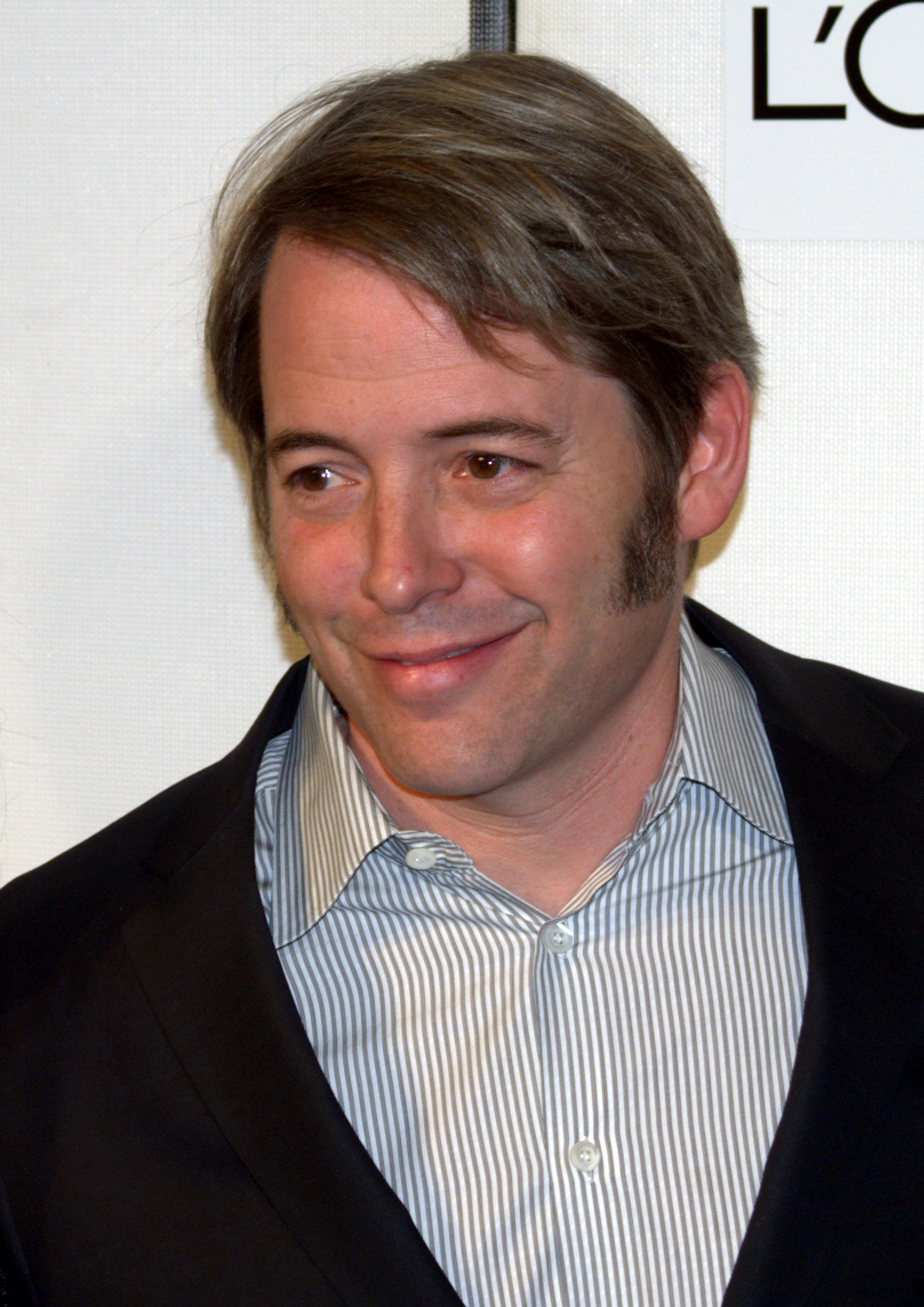
Critics praised the return of Matthew Broderick's Cooter Burger as a welcomed callback to the show's second season.

"Governor Dunston" was watched by 3.40 million viewers and earned a 1.3 rating/4 share in the 18–49 demographic. This means that it was seen by 1.3 percent of all 18- to 49-year-olds, and 4 percent of all 18- to 49-year-olds watching television at the time of the broadcast. This was a decrease from the season seven premiere "The Beginning of the End" (3.46 million). In its original Australian television broadcast on September 16, 2013 the episode was watched by 63,000 viewers via the Seven Network.

Critical response to "Governor Dunston" has been positive. Pilot Viruet of The A.V. Club gave the episode an "A−" and praised the satirical politics of the episode and the performances of guest stars Catherine O’Hara, Bryan Cranston, and Matthew Broderick. TV.com writer Julia Bergen gave the episode a strong review, stating that her "hopes for the rest of the season are pretty high" and "Based on 'Governor Dunston', I think it's safe to say that instead of taking it easy, the writers are trying to fit in all of the storylines that are too good not to get made." Amy Amatangelo of Paste magazine gave the episode a 7.0 out of 10 and praised the allusions to the 2012 Presidential election, but criticized a lack of clever humor, commenting "As much as I’m enjoying this take-no-prisoners march towards the series finale, I delight in the show the most when its comedy is smart and quick. I would have appreciated the Governor Dunston shenanigans more if he hadn’t been a total buffoon."

== Cultural references ==
The storyline of vice presidential candidate Governor Dunston and his striking resemblance to sketch comedy star Tracy Jordan alludes to Tina Fey's impersonations of vice presidential candidate Governor Sarah Palin on Saturday Night Live during the 2008 presidential elections. The fictional disqualification of vice presidential candidate Paul Ryan in "Governor Dunston" due to having been born in Kenya makes allusion to popular "Birther" theories. These theories falsely alleged that President Barack Obama was Kenyan by birth and therefore ineligible for the Presidency.
