= Mazel Tov, Dummies! =

- 30 Rock episode
- Episode no.: Season 7 Episode 7
- Directed by: Beth McCarthy-Miller
- Written by: Tracey Wigfield
- Production code: 707
- Original air date: November 29, 2012

Guest appearances
- James Marsden as Criss Chros; Dean Winters as Dennis Duffy; Chris Parnell as Dr. Spaceman; John Hodgman as Terry; Tony Bennett as himself

Episode chronology
← Previous "Aunt Phatso vs. Jack Donaghy"	Next → "My Whole Life Is Thunder"
- 30 Rock season 7

"Mazel Tov, Dummies!" is the seventh episode of the seventh season of the American television comedy series 30 Rock, and the 132nd overall episode of the series. It was directed by Beth McCarthy-Miller and written by Tracey Wigfield. The episode originally aired on NBC in the United States on November 29, 2012.

The episode received a positive critical response and was watched by 3.61 million viewers.

== Plot ==
Liz (Tina Fey) is appalled when she learns that idiotic ex-boyfriend Dennis (Dean Winters) has been allowed to adopt simply because he is married. Despite her feminist reservations about the ritual of marriage and the wedding industry, she and current live-in boyfriend Criss (James Marsden) decide to have a low-key wedding that day at City Hall, hoping to improve their chances of adoption. A series of reversals eventually forces Liz to admit to herself that she would like her wedding to be a special day after all. Criss, Jack, (Alec Baldwin), and Dennis all help to make that a reality.

Meanwhile, Jenna (Jane Krakowski) is approached by a crazed fan named Terry (John Hodgman) who has collected 1,000,000 Surge Cola points over two decades. According to the rules of an old contest, he is granted ownership of Jenna. Jenna is initially resigned to her fate, but Jack manages to negotiate with the fan so that he accepts $2,000 instead. Jenna is initially depressed that her value is so low, but Jack cheers her up by convincing her that he is equally past his prime. He remains in a funk until Liz's wedding gives him hope again.

Tracy (Tracy Morgan) is mortified to learn from Dr. Spaceman (Chris Parnell) that he is finally completely healthy. Dr. Spaceman tells Tracy he is likely to live for decades, meaning that he can no longer behave recklessly. Following a stretch where he attempts to do responsible things like watching his health and saving for retirement, Tracy is struck by a taxi. He realizes that he might still die at any moment and can live life to the fullest.

== Reception ==
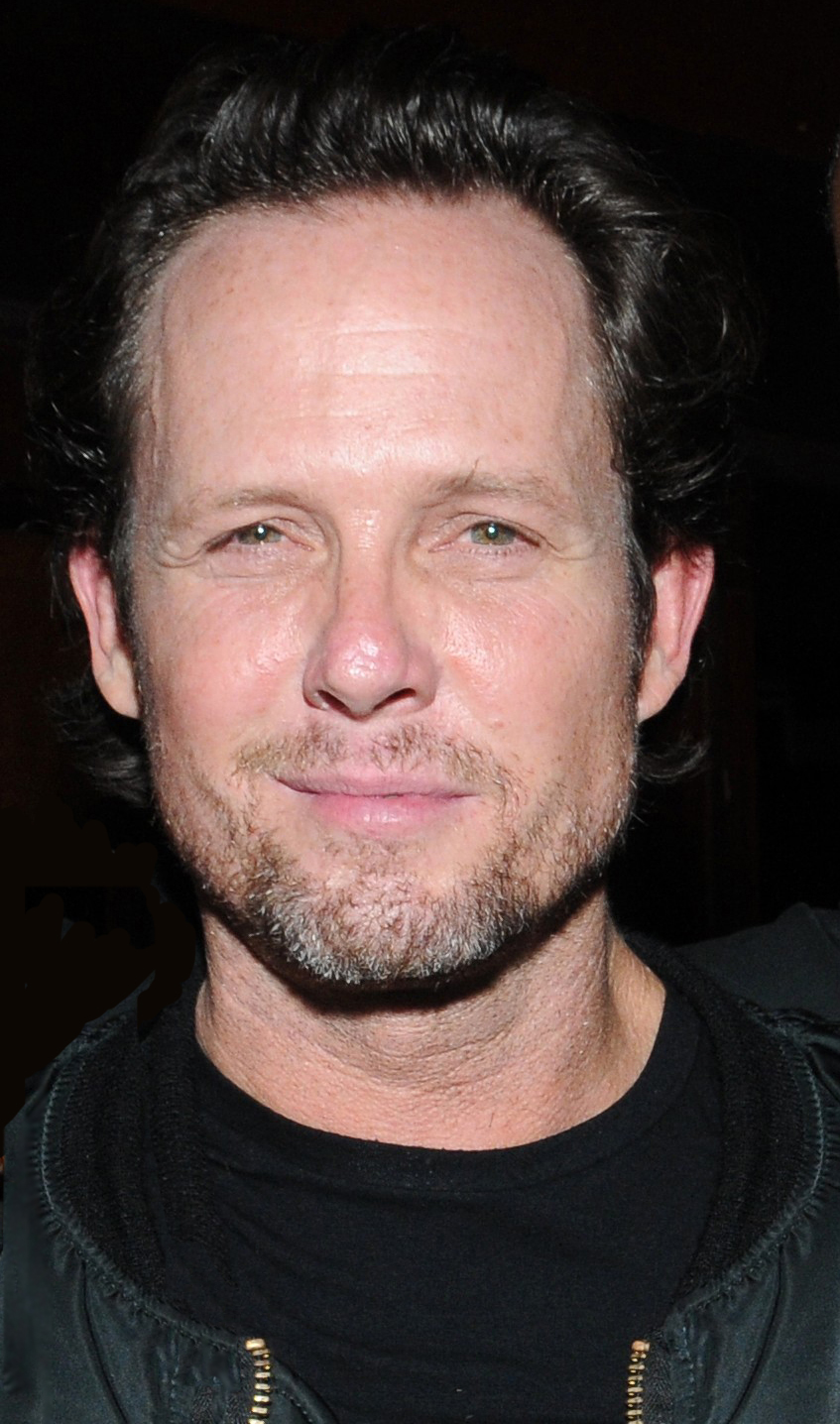
Dean Winters

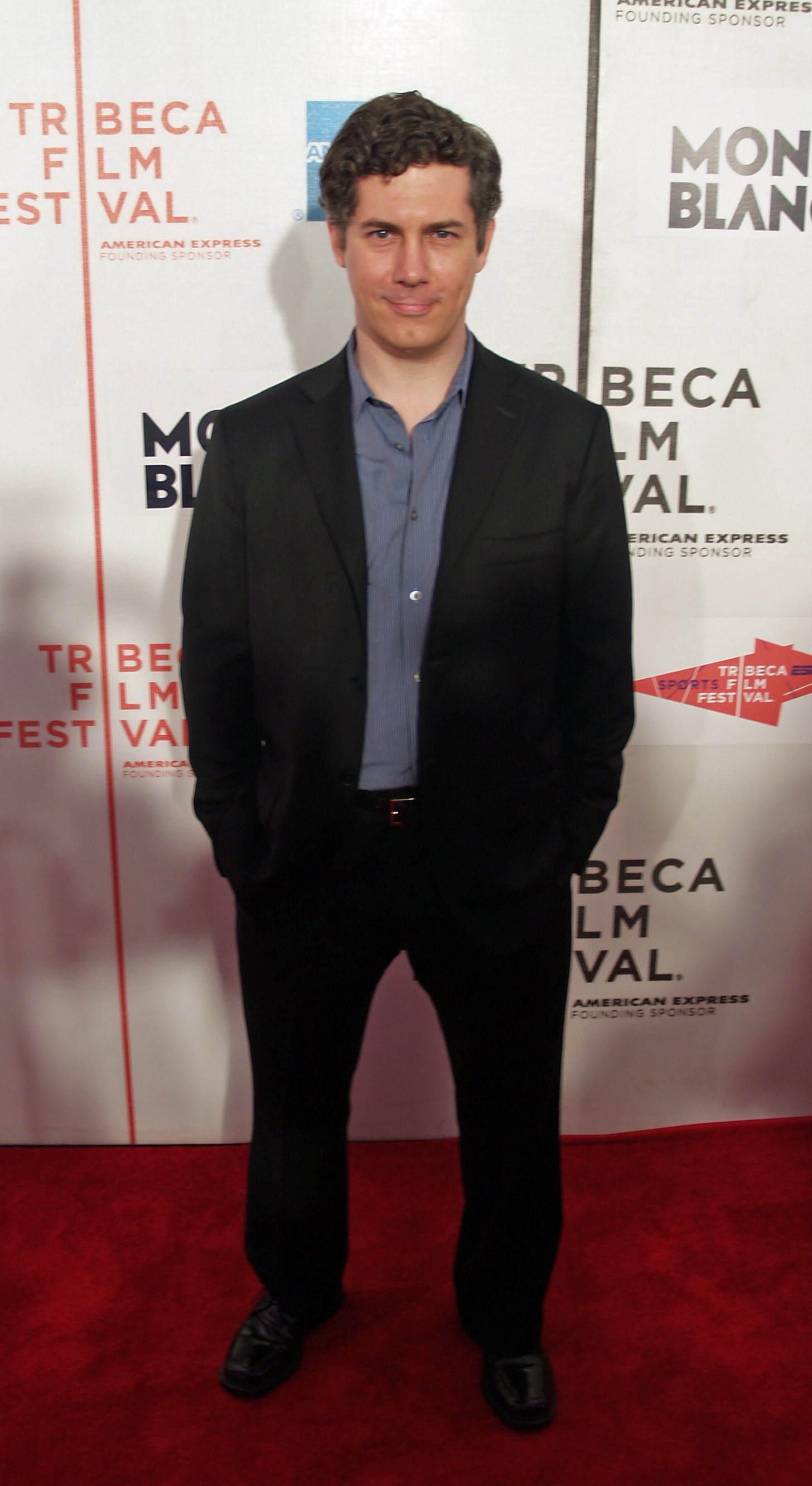
Chris Parnell

"Mazel Tov, Dummies!" was the thirteenth and twenty-second appearances of guest stars Dean Winters (Dennis Duffy) and Chris Parnell (Dr. Spaceman) respectively, marking their inclusion in all seven seasons.

"Mazel Tov, Dummies!" was watched by 3.61 million viewers and earned a 1.3 rating/4 share in the 18–49 demographic. This means that it was seen by 1.3 percent of all 18- to 49-year-olds, and 4 percent of all 18- to 49-year-olds watching television at the time of the broadcast. This was an increase from the previous episode "Aunt Phatso vs. Jack Donaghy" (3.34 million).

"Mazel Tov, Dummies!" received a very positive response from critics. Roth Cornet of IGN commended the return of popular guest stars Dean Winters and Chris Parnell (as Dennis Duffy and Dr. Spaceman, respectively), and enthusiastically praised the Liz Lemon/Criss Chros marriage and Tina Fey for "representing and redefining the modern woman for the entire run of the series". Amy Amatangelo of Paste magazine gave the episode a strong 9.0 out of 10 and lauded Fey's feminist portrayal of Liz Lemon, stating "Liz Lemon has long been one of TV’s sole representations of a single woman over 35. What I’ve loved about her struggle to meet the right guy is that it never, ever defined her. It was merely one aspect of her complex life. Viewers knew Liz would be fine if she never got married." Pilot Viruet of The A.V. Club gave the episode an "A−", saying that any of her concerns that the episode might "fall into that too-sweet, forced-emotion trap" were "quickly assuaged by the proposal" and culminated in "a wedding that could only exist on 30 Rock."
