= The Beginning of the End (30 Rock) =

- 30 Rock episode
- Episode no.: Season 7 Episode 1
- Directed by: Don Scardino
- Written by: Jack Burditt
- Production code: 701
- Original air date: October 4, 2012

Guest appearance
- Steve Higgins as Homonym Host

Episode chronology
← Previous "What Will Happen to the Gang Next Year?"	Next → "Governor Dunston"
- 30 Rock season 7

"The Beginning of the End" is the first episode of the seventh season of the American television comedy series 30 Rock, and the 126th overall episode of the series. It was directed by Don Scardino, and written by Jack Burditt. The episode originally aired on NBC in the United States on October 4, 2012.

"The Beginning of the End" received a positive critical response and was watched by 3.46 million viewers. It is the only season premiere episode of the series not to be written by Tina Fey.

== Plot ==
Liz (Tina Fey) begins to notice that Jack (Alec Baldwin) is green-lighting an exceptionally terrible lineup of new NBC shows like Homonym (a word definition game show where every clue has a homophone, and the host inevitably responds to the contestant's guess with "It's the other one") and God Cop (in which Jack himself plays God). Eventually, she discovers that Jack is trying to "tank" NBC so that Kabletown CEO Hank Hooper will sell the network entirely to Paas, an Easter egg dye company that Jack sees as a more promising future. In the end, Liz agrees to work with Jack on "tanking" NBC so that Hank will sell the network. The two work together to make TGS with Tracy Jordan terrible.

Meanwhile, Jenna (Jane Krakowski) asks Liz to be her bridesmaid at her upcoming wedding. Liz decides to apply Jack's "tanking" method to her bridesmaid duties, hoping Jenna will choose someone else once she sees Liz is terrible at the job. After Liz throws Jenna a disastrous bachelorette party, Jenna erupts with anger and begins to destroy Liz's apartment. Eventually, Liz is able to calm Jenna down. Liz convinces Jenna that Jenna herself is the only person truly capable of doing the job of bridesmaid. This inspires Jenna to literally become her own bridesmaid.

Elsewhere, Hazel (Kristen Schaal) and Kenneth (Jack McBrayer) invite Tracy (Tracy Morgan) over for dinner. When Kenneth leaves the room to kill their dinner, Hazel begins making advances towards Tracy. In doing so, Hazel admits she was only dating Kenneth so that she could use him. She wanted to get close to Tracy, hoping he would cast her in a movie and in effect, launch her career in show business. This sparks outrage in Tracy. Tracy is a genuine friend to Kenneth, so he will not tolerate Hazel's selfish manipulation. A feud ensues between Hazel and Tracy, who both attempt to compete for the love and trust of Kenneth.

== Reception ==
"The Beginning of the End" was watched by 3.46 million viewers and earned a 1.4 rating/4 share in the 18–49 demographic. This means that it was seen by 1.4 percent of all 18- to 49-year-olds, and 4 percent of all 18- to 49-year-olds watching television at the time of the broadcast. This was a decrease from the previous season premiere (4.47 million), but an increase from the previous episode, the sixth-season finale (2.84 million). In its original Australian television broadcast on September 9, 2013, the episode was watched by 79,000 viewers via the Seven Network.

The episode received mostly positive reviews from critics. Writing for The A.V. Club, Pilot Viruet gave "The Beginning of the End" an "A−" and praised the "rapid-fire jokes, the great callbacks [..., and] the biting-the-hand-that-feeds-you approach to NBC." Eric Goldman of IGN also gave the episode an overall positive review and highly praised the Liz/Jack dynamic, but described the different storylines as "a mixed bag." TV.com's Julia Bergen gave the final season premiere an enthusiastic review, stating, "So many shows start spiraling by Season 3 (or earlier), and it really says something about 30 Rock that even in its last season, Tina Fey and company refuse to produce something sub-par." Bonnie Stiernberg of Paste magazine gave the episode an 8.8 out of 10 highly praising the "tanking" plot as "30 Rock‘s way of going out with a bang" and described the show's eminent conclusion as "... leaving us at the perfect moment: Liz Lemon and friends have been around the block long enough to show us all they’re capable of, but they’re bowing out while still on top of their game, as evidenced by this season’s premiere."
