= A Goon's Deed in a Weary World =

- 30 Rock episode
- Episode no.: Season 7 Episode 11
- Directed by: Jeff Richmond
- Written by: Lang Fisher; Nina Pedrad
- Production code: 711
- Original air date: January 24, 2013

Guest appearances
- James Marsden as Criss Chros; Steve Higgins as Homonym Host; Matt Oberg as Edward; Dante Hoagland as Terry; Remy Bond as Janet

Episode chronology
← Previous "Florida"	Next → "Hogcock!"
- 30 Rock season 7

"A Goon's Deed in a Weary World" is the eleventh episode of the seventh season of the American television comedy series 30 Rock, the 136th overall episode, and the penultimate episode of the series (although the series finale, which aired the following week, is technically composed of two episodes, "Hogcock!" and "Last Lunch"). It was directed by Jeff Richmond and written by Lang Fisher and Nina Pedrad. The episode originally aired on NBC in the United States on January 24, 2013.

The episode received a positive critical response and was watched by 3.81 million viewers.

== Plot ==
Liz Lemon (Tina Fey) and Criss receive a message from Bev at the adoption agency, informing them that their children will arrive at the airport in a few days. Liz has other things on her mind however, as she prepares for a meeting with the Kabletown board to try to convince them to save TGS. In desperation, she orders her writing team to roll out their best work, Tracy Jordan (Tracy Morgan) and Jenna Maroney (Jane Krakowski) to conduct publicity, and Pete to slash the budget. Ultimately, they decide that they need a sponsor who is willing to be associated with the show, despite the controversy from Hazel's lawsuit. With no takers, Liz resorts to visiting an organization called Bro Body Douche. The organization agrees to sponsor the show, but only if it is retitled Man Cave and Liz adopts the nom de plume Todd Debeikis to hide the fact that she is a woman. Liz accepts and returns to work. She receives a phone call from Criss, who is annoyed that she is neglecting to join him in buying toys for their children. However, she is distracted once again when she discovers that the writers have done nothing, and that Tracy and Jenna have used their press time to instead promote Heads of State, a movie they are going to make together about interracial conjoined twins of different genders serving as United States co-Presidents.

Meanwhile, new Kabletown CEO Jack Donaghy (Alec Baldwin) prepares to pick his replacement as president of NBC. He devises an unconventional plan, adapted from Charlie and the Chocolate Factory. He promotes Kenneth Parcell (Jack McBrayer) back into his old page role and orders him to give a tour of the building to the final five candidates for the job. He reveals to Kenneth that the candidates think the tour is just a formality before the final interview. Nevertheless, it is in fact the final interview, since the best time to judge a person is when they don't know they're being judged. Fittingly, the candidates themselves are all references to characters in Charlie and the Chocolate Factory (e.g. Mike Webb, who is looking at his smartphone in reference to Mike Teavee, a boy who does nothing but watch television; Veruca Salke [Salt in the original]; an obese Augustus Blorch [Gloop], and a gum-chewing woman dressed like Violet Beauregarde). Kenneth immediately bonds with one candidate, Charlie MacGuffin, after the pair simultaneously refer to a joke that had appeared on the Today Show earlier that day. As the tour progresses, MacGuffin's passion for and knowledge about the history of the network convinces Kenneth that he is the man for the job. Jack, however, becomes annoyed with Kenneth for interfering and dismisses him from the tour.

Finally, as the board meeting approaches, Liz receives another phone call from Criss, who tells her that Bev made a mistake. Their children are actually arriving at the airport later that afternoon. Liz once again prioritizes TGS, but is overheard by Tracy, Jenna and the crew. Finally, after seven years, everybody decides to step up and help Liz in the only way they can. They inform the board that they are all quitting and tell Liz to go and meet her children. As a final test for MacGuffin, Kenneth masquerades as a CBS executive, C.B. Essington, and (in reference to Arthur Slugworth), attempts to bribe him with money if he will go to Jack's office and steal an in-development script. MacGuffin refuses, convincing Kenneth once and for all that he is the right man to take over NBC. However, it transpires that MacGuffin's true reason for being so knowledgeable about NBC is that he is going to strip it for parts and turn the building into a Forever 21, since both he and Jack believe broadcast television's days are numbered. Kenneth argues that a network president needs to care about television and not just the bottom line. He says that MacGuffin is not right for the role and neither was Jack.

Later, Kenneth comes to Jack's office to resign from his role as page, but Jack surprises him by admitting that he was right: television is an unconventional medium, nearly every program he developed himself has failed, and the best skill for leading the network is, seemingly, loving television. For this reason, he has decided that the best candidate to be the new president is, in fact, Kenneth. At the airport, Liz and Criss meet their adopted children, Terry and Janet—a pair of interracial twins whose personalities and physical appearances closely resemble those of Tracy and Jenna. Liz muses happily that this "seems about right" and she embraces the pair.

== Reception ==
"A Goon's Deed in a Weary World" was watched by 3.81 million viewers and earned a 1.4 rating/4 share in the 18–49 demographic. This means that it was seen by 1.4 percent of all 18- to 49-year-olds and 4 percent of all 18- to 49-year-olds watching television at the time of the broadcast. This was an increase from the previous episode "Florida" (3.44 million), and a season high in total viewers.

Critical response for "A Goon's Deed in a Weary World" has been positive. Pilot Viruet of The A.V. Club gave the episode an "A" and described it as “... an absolutely fantastic episode of television. It was an episode that was full of nonstop jokes, one that featured some genuinely emotional moments that caught me off guard, and one that was so much fun to watch that I immediately watched it a second time as soon as it was over." IGN's Roth Cornet also gave the episode a positive review, saying "There are likely things that I could nitpick about the episode here and there. I’d rather not, though. Overall, this would have made for a fine conclusion to the 30 Rock journey, and at the end of the day, I am simply savoring the last moments of a series that has proved to be unfailingly smart, uniquely funny and deservedly [...] sweet." Alan Sepinwall, writing for HitFix, wrote the episode a glowing review, noting that the episode "... would have functioned quite well as a series finale" and that "it's not that it was the funniest episode of this victory lap season [...], but that it brought very satisfying closure to the stories of Liz Lemon and Jack Donaghy. As great as the 30 Rock supporting cast and recurring players have been, this has always been a show about the two of them, and here they got what amounted to the perfect happy endings for their characters." However, Amy Amatangelo of Paste magazine described the episode as "just OK" and gave it a moderately positive rank of 7.9 out of 10, noting her high expectations for the final season and describing the series quality as still "on top of its game."

Alec Baldwin submitted this episode for consideration due to his nomination for the Primetime Emmy Award for Outstanding Lead Actor in a Comedy Series at the 65th Primetime Emmy Awards.
