= The Lennon Report =

2016 biopic film about John Lennon

The Lennon Report is a 2016 American biographical film written by Walter Vincent and directed by Jeremy Profe, about the night John Lennon was shot and killed on December 8, 1980. The film is produced by Gabriel Francisco and Rafael Francisco. The film stars Richard Kind, Adrienne C. Moore, and Stef Dawson. Karen Tsen Lee plays Yoko Ono. The film focuses on attempts by doctors and nurses to save Lennon's life. The reason the film was made was to correct several misconceptions tied to the events. The credits at the end of the film contain eyewitness accounts by those in attendance in the ER.

== See also ==
- The Killing of John Lennon (2006)
- Chapter 27 (2007)
