= Aunt Phatso vs. Jack Donaghy =

- 30 Rock episode
- Episode no.: Season 7 Episode 6
- Directed by: Don Scardino
- Written by: Luke Del Tredici
- Production code: 706
- Original air date: November 15, 2012

Guest appearance
- Alan Gilbert as himself

Episode chronology
← Previous "There's No I in America"	Next → "Mazel Tov, Dummies!"
- 30 Rock season 7

"Aunt Phatso vs. Jack Donaghy" is the sixth episode of the seventh season of the American television comedy series 30 Rock, and the 131st overall episode of the series. It was directed by Don Scardino and written by Luke Del Tredici. The episode originally aired on NBC in the United States on November 15, 2012.

The episode received a positive reception from critics and was watched by 3.34 million viewers.

== Plot ==
Jack Donaghy (Alec Baldwin) has suddenly become the laughing stock of New York City and he doesn't know why. He finally realizes that people are laughing at him because Tracy Jordan (Tracy Morgan) has made him a villain in his new "Aunt Phatso" movie. Jack confronts Tracy about the movie and Tracy is furious because Jack doesn't give him enough respect. Tracy then donates a large amount of money to the New York Philharmonic to have them play the Sanford and Son theme ("The Streetbeater") for four hours straight at a concert. This ruins the concert for Jack, who was in attendance that night. The next morning, Jack threatens to sue Tracy. Tracy explains to Jack that every action and line used to portray Jack in the movie has been done in real life by Jack himself, except for the scene where Jack closes an orphanage. Jack finally realises that he can't shut down the movie without shutting down a real orphanage, as the movie's funding is linked to that of an orphanage. Jack gives up and Tracy wins.

Meanwhile, Liz Lemon (Tina Fey) needs foot surgery. However, she can't take time off because without her in charge, everything will fall apart. Hazel (Kristen Schaal) offers to become Liz's personal assistant. Liz agrees to this so that she can have the surgery. Unbeknownst to Liz, Hazel is using this position to get a spot on TV. Jenna (Jane Krakowski), who knows of Hazel's manipulative nature, asks Kenneth (Jack McBrayer) why he is still attached to Hazel. Kenneth answers her question, but Jenna is too self-absorbed and doesn't pay attention to Kenneth's answer.

Hazel tells Liz to relax in her office while she helps Pete (Scott Adsit) prepare the show. To make sure that nothing goes wrong, Hazel sets up a video feed in Liz's office so that Liz can monitor the show from there. Liz realizes something is wrong when she sees herself in the video feed. As it turns out, the "feed" was a recording of an old show from years ago. Hazel tricks Pete into giving her a spot on the show. Liz rushes to the set (ruining her carefully protected post-surgery foot in the process) and fires Hazel on the spot. Kenneth is mad because Jenna didn't listen to him and Liz fired his girlfriend. Kenneth then tells them that from now on, he is no longer friends with any of them.

== Reception ==
"Aunt Phatso vs. Jack Donaghy" was watched by 3.34 million viewers and earned a 1.2 rating/4 share in the 18–49 demographic. This means that it was seen by 1.2 percent of all 18- to 49-year-olds, and 4 percent of all 18- to 49-year-olds watching television at the time of the broadcast. This was a decrease from the previous episode "There's No I in America" (3.38 million).

"Aunt Phatso vs. Jack Donaghy" received a positive response from critics. Pilot Viruet of The A.V. Club gave the episode a "B+" and praised the Hazel elements of the story, despite having been critical of the character's execution in past episodes. IGN's Roth Cornet also gave the episode a positive review, stating "... though this wasn't my favorite episode, as it approaches its swan song, 30 Rock feels something like a cross between a human-Muppet caper, the irreverent and rapid fire free-association of Family Guy and the hilarious social commentary of Eddie Izzard's stand-up. In a word: awesome."
