= 30 Rock: A One-Time Special =

- 30 Rock episode
- Directed by: Oz Rodriguez
- Written by: Tina Fey; Robert Carlock
- Original air date: July 16, 2020
- Running time: 38 minutes

Episode chronology
← Previous "Last Lunch"	Next → —

"30 Rock: A One-Time Special" is a special episode of the American comedy television series 30 Rock, and the 139th overall episode of the series. It aired in the United States on NBC on July 16, 2020. It served as NBC's 2020 upfront presentation and reunited cast members Tina Fey, Alec Baldwin, Tracy Morgan, Jane Krakowski, Scott Adsit, Judah Friedlander, and Jack McBrayer.

== Plot ==
During the COVID-19 pandemic in 2020, Jack calls Liz to inform her that Kenneth Parcell, now the head of NBC, has asked them to reunite the cast for a TGS reboot on Peacock. Liz reaches out to the former writers of the show to see if they are interested, and they agree to participate. Liz also is able to recruit former stars Tracy Jordan and, despite initially avoiding her due to a series of public controversies, Jenna Maroney to return.

The gang virtually reunites to pitch it to Kenneth, but he refuses, revealing it was all a ruse to confront them about ignoring his several attempts to reunite virtually over Zoom. After being rejected, Jack reveals to Liz that he is bored of retirement and desperately wants to get back in the television game. Liz, Jack, Jenna, and Tracy all unite to crash Kenneth's speech during the NBC upfront. Kenneth gathers them in a private web room and realizes during their confrontation about his stunt that he's sick of being surrounded by "yes-persons" and missed having people be honest with him. Tracy and Jenna volunteer to lead the presentation while Kenneth shows Liz and Jack trailers for upcoming shows, to which they react with positivity.

After the presentation, Jack reveals to Liz that Kenneth has asked him to lead NBC's new female-centric streaming service Peahen and Liz reveals that Kenneth has asked her to write a new pilot.

Throughout the episode, promotions are made for several NBCUniversal properties, including Peacock, Universal Parks & Resorts, Telemundo, NBC News, coverage of the rescheduled 2020 Summer Olympics, as well as upcoming new shows for the 2020–2021 television season.

== Background ==
On June 16, 2020, NBC announced the network would air a new, remotely produced special episode of the series.

On July 14, Vulture reported that most of NBC's major affiliate groups, including Tegna, Hearst Television, Sinclair Broadcast Group, Nexstar Media Group, and Gray Television, whose NBC affiliates together reach about half the United States' population, would be refusing to air the special due to its focus on NBCUniversal's streaming service, Peacock, which these owners believed could siphon viewers away from their stations. Certain affiliates did not air the episode, while others delayed it from its networked timeslot until the graveyard slot. The following day, it was made available on the NBC website and Peacock, and aired in primetime as part of a "roadblock" simulcast on several of NBCUniversal's cable channels.

== Cast ==
For the special, the entirety of the main cast of the series returned, as well as several recurring cast members. The special also saw the appearances of several stars from different NBCUniversal television properties.

=== Main and recurring cast ===
- Tina Fey as Liz Lemon
- Alec Baldwin as Jack Donaghy
- Tracy Morgan as Tracy Jordan
- Jane Krakowski as Jenna Maroney
- Jack McBrayer as Kenneth Parcell/Vivica
- Scott Adsit as Pete Hornberger
- Judah Friedlander as Frank Rossitano
- Keith Powell as James "Toofer" Spurlock
- John Lutz as J.D. Lutz
- Maulik Pancholy as Jonathan
- Sue Galloway as Sue
- Grizz Chapman as Grizz
- Paula Pell as Paula Hornberger
- James Marsden as Criss Chros (voice)
- Eric Gurian as No Mask Guy
- Alice Richmond as Liz's daughter

=== As themselves ===
- Lauren Ash
- Stephanie Beatriz
- Kandi Burruss
- Todd Chrisley
- Kelly Clarkson
- Andy Cohen
- Terry Crews
- Ted Danson
- Kate del Castillo
- Jimmy Fallon
- Nick Gehlfuss
- Lauren Graham
- Mariska Hargitay
- Derek Hough
- Justin Hartley
- Don Johnson
- Dwayne Johnson
- Khloé Kardashian
- Heidi Klum
- Hoda Kotb
- John Legend
- Jane Levy
- Mario Lopez
- Jane Lynch
- Howie Mandel
- Miranda Rae Mayo
- Christopher Meloni
- Chrissy Metz
- The Miz
- Mandy Moore
- Al Roker
- Andy Samberg
- Blake Shelton
- Marina Squerciati
- Mary Steenburgen
- Gwen Stefani
- Kenan Thompson
- Mike Tirico
- Milo Ventimiglia
- Sofía Vergara

== Release ==
This special was not shown on a substantial proportion of NBC affiliates. Of the approximate 2.5 million that watched any given NBC affiliate during the slot, an average of around 1.7 million watched other content being shown by their affiliate during the hour, including news specials, daytime talk show repeats, other local shows and comedy repeats.

=== Critical reception ===
The special received mixed reviews from critics. On Rotten Tomatoes, it holds a 31% approval rating based on 13 reviews, with an average rating of 7.33/10. The website's critical consensus is, "It's fun to see the gang back together, but this One-Time Special has a little too much corporate synergy and not enough of the show's sardonic wit." It holds on Metacritic a weighted average score of 49 out of 100 based on 13 reviews, indicating "mixed or average reviews".

LaToya Ferguson of The A.V. Club commented upon the nature of the special given the show's recurring themes and in-universe portrayals of NBC itself, explaining that "a blatant hour-long commercial for television is technically the natural progression for the story 30 Rock told, which allows the special to somehow reach an even higher level of meta inception than it already had". Ferguson also praised the "seamless" nature of its videoconference-based scenes, and argued that although it was not the best episode of the series as a whole (if it could be considered an episode at all), "the fact that the story in between the ads actually works as a passable episode of 30 Rock only helps the special to do the job it's really supposed to be doing: selling NBC Universal to advertisers (and viewers, as a distant second).""

=== Ratings ===
Preliminary ratings indicated the special episode scored a 0.4 rating in the 18–49 demographic, with an average of 2.49 million viewers in the 8–9 p.m. timeslot (averaging 0.4 and 2.8 million in the first half-hour and 0.3 and 2.1 million in the second). Final ratings, which accounted for local preemptions (in what is believed to be 60% of NBC's affiliates), revised the episode's audience down to 0.2 and 878,000 viewers (beaten by a Superstore re-run in the 9–9:30 p.m. timeslot after, and the second-lowest viewership of the night on the Big Four).
