= Colleen McGuinness =

American producer and screenwriter

Colleen McGuinness is an American director, screenwriter, and producer who has worked as a writer and producer on shows including 30 Rock, Life & Beth, and Ramy. After joining 30 Rock in 2011, she shared in its Primetime Emmy nomination for best comedy series in 2013 as well as in its 65th and 66th WGA Awards nominations and 2014 PGA Awards nomination. McGuinness directed the 2024 short film Loser which has been adapted into a feature film with the same name and is produced by Radio Silence, Dan Lawler, and Michael Sherman. The film is in post-production as of summer 2026.

== Early life and education ==
McGuinness, who is half-Korean and half-Irish, was born in Killeen, Texas, and was raised on Long Island in Islip, New York. McGuinness was a tennis champion in high school.

At Harvard University, McGuinness studied directing with Professor Marcus Stern and directed productions of A Doll's House and Guys and Dolls while also producing a version of Hamlet. The production of Guys and Dolls that McGuinness directed was the first undergraduate co-ed production at the Hasty Pudding Theater in over 10 years. Upon graduating, McGuinness was awarded the Louise Donovan award for directing.

== Career ==
McGuinness began her career at Castle Rock Entertainment and later became a development assistant at New Line Cinema. While at New Line, McGuinness wrote and directed her first short film, For Mature Audiences Only.

After Darren Starr saw her short film, he hired McGuinness for her first series writing job on Miss Match, starring Alicia Silverstone. Since then, McGuinness has written on shows including Mercy, 30 Rock, About a Boy, Friends from College, Forever, Ramy, Stargirl, and Life & Beth, where she was also an executive producer. She joined the staff of 30 Rock in 2011, which ultimately led her to share in the series' Emmy, WGA, and PGA nominations.

In 2013, when Tina Fey started her new production company Little Stranger Productions, her company's first sale was an untitled comedy to be written by McGuinness and executive-produced by Fey and by former 30 Rock showrunner Robert Carlock. In 2014, McGuinness developed a script with Matt Damon and Ben Affleck for Fox.

In 2016, together with Game of Thrones executive producer Carolyn Strauss, McGuinness worked with HBO to develop a comedy series based on the novel Prep by Curtis Sittenfeld.

McGuinness later wrote, produced, and directed the 2024 short film Loser, which has played in over 25 film festivals, including the Oscar-qualifying Hamptons International Film Festival and the Palm Springs International ShortFest. Loser won multiple awards, including "Best International Short", "Best Director" (Colleen McGuinness), and "Best Performance in a Lead Role" (Angourie Rice) at the Oxford International Film Festival, "Best Short" and "Best Screenplay" (Colleen McGuinness) at the LA Indie Film Festival, "Best Film" and "Best Actress" (Angourie Rice) at DOC LA, "International: Best Film" at the Canberra Short Film Festival, "Best Short Film" at the Byron Bay International Film Festival, "Best Short Drama" at the New Hampshire Film Festival, and the "Audience Award" at the Charlotte Film Festival.

McGuinness is currently in post-production on the feature film Loser, produced by Radio Silence.

== Filmography ==
=== Film ===
Key
†	Denotes films that have not yet been released

Years	Title	Writer	Director	Producer	Notes
2002	For Mature Audiences Only	Yes	Yes	Executive	Short film
2024	Loser	Yes	Yes	Yes	Short film
TBA	Loser †	Yes	Yes	Yes	Feature film; post-production

=== Television ===
Years	Title	Writer	Executive producer	Notes
2003	Miss Match	Yes (1)	No	
2004	North Shore	Yes (1)	No	
2009–2010	Mercy	Yes (3)	No	
2011	Love Bites	Yes (2)	Co-producer	
2011–2013	30 Rock	Yes (2)	Producer	
2014	About a Boy	Yes (1)	Supervising	
2017	Friends from College	Yes (1)	Co-executive	
2018	Forever	Yes (1)	Consulting	
2020	Ramy	Yes (1)	Co-executive	
2020–2022	Stargirl	Yes (2)	Co-executive	
2022	Life & Beth	Yes (2)	Yes	
2026	Furious	Yes (1)	Co-executive	

== Awards and nominations ==
Year	Awards	Category	Project	Result	Ref.
2013	65th Writers Guild of America Awards	Comedy Series	30 Rock	Nominated	
2013	66th Primetime Emmy Awards	Outstanding Comedy Series	30 Rock	Nominated	
2014	66th Writers Guild of America Awards	Comedy Series	30 Rock	Nominated	
2014	25th Producers Guild of America Awards	Outstanding Producer of Episodic Television, Comedy	30 Rock	Nominated	
2024	Arizona Underground Film Festival	Best Narrative Short	Loser	Won	
2024	Byron Bay International Film Festival	Best Short Film	Loser	Won	
2024	Canberra Short Film Festival	Best Film	Loser	Won	
2024	Charlotte Film Festival	Audience Award	Loser	Won	
2024	DOC LA	Best Film	Loser	Won	
2024	New Hampshire Film Festival	Best Short Drama	Loser	Won	
2024	LA Indie Film Festival	Best Short	Loser	Won	
2024	LA Indie Film Festival	Best Screenplay	Loser	Won	
2024	Oxford International Film Festival	Best Director	Loser	Won	
2024	Oxford International Film Festival	Best International Short	Loser	Won	
