= Pat Battle =

American journalist (born 1959)

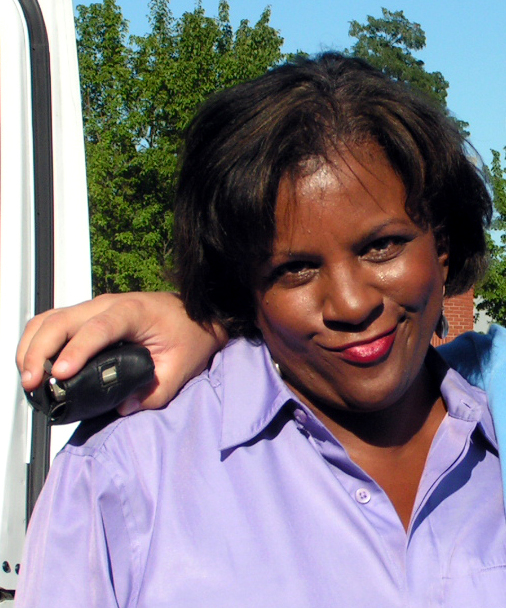
- Battle in 2005
- Born: Patricia N. Battle; December 9, 1959 (age 66)
- Occupation: Journalist
- Spouse: Anthony Johnson

Pat Battle (born December 9, 1959) is an American television journalist and news anchor. Since 1996, she has been at WNBC-TV.

== Early life ==
Patricia (nickname, "Pat") N. Battle was born December 9, 1959. Of African-American descent, she grew up in Neptune Township, New Jersey, where her mother was a member of the township committee and served as police commissioner. She graduated from Neptune High School in 1977, where she had been a cheerleader. Her first job was with the Asbury Park Press as a reporter.

== Career ==
Battle won a 2005 New York Regional Emmy Award for Political Programming for her work on the U.S. presidential primary edition of WNBC-TV's What Matters.

She appeared as herself on the Netflix series, Unbreakable Kimmy Schmidt and is set to appear in a second-season episode of Peacock's Girls5eva.

== Personal life ==
Battle is a resident of Teaneck, New Jersey, and is married to Anthony Johnson, a reporter with WABC-TV, a competing New York City television station. In October 2010, she publicly revealed that she had been diagnosed with breast cancer and undergone a lumpectomy.

== Filmography ==
=== Film ===
Year	Title	Role	Notes
2011	New Year's Eve	Reporter	"Times Square" segment; first major film acting debut
2012	The Bourne Legacy	MSNBC anchor	
2022	The Batman	Newscaster	

=== Television ===
Year	Title	Role	Notes
2012	30 Rock	Herself	1 episode (season 7, episode 8: My Whole Life Is Thunder), appeared alongside fellow WNBC colleague Sue Simmons.
2015	Unbreakable Kimmy Schmidt	Herself	1 episode (season 1, episode 4: Kimmy Goes to the Doctor!); credited as Patricia Battle.
2022	Girls5eva	Herself	2 episodes (season 2, episode 1: Album Mode, season 2, episode 7: Returnity).

== See also ==
- List of American print journalists
- List of people from Teaneck, New Jersey
- List of people from New York City
- List of people from Philadelphia
- List of television reporters
- List of University of Maryland, College Park people
