= Tracey Wigfield =

American comedy writer (born 1983)

- Born: June 19, 1983 (age 43); Wayne, New Jersey, United States
- Education: Boston College
- Occupations: Actress; comedian; writer; producer
- Years active: 2007–present
- Notable work: 30 Rock; Great News; Saved by the Bell
- Spouse: Adam Countee (m. 2016)
- Children: 3

Tracey Wigfield (born June 19, 1983) is an American comedy writer, actress, comedian and producer. She created, produced and appeared in the NBC sitcom Great News. She also developed the Peacock teen sitcom Saved by the Bell, a revival of the original series of the same name created by Sam Bobrick.

== Early life ==
Raised in Wayne, New Jersey, Wigfield attended Catholic schools throughout grade school. As a child, she was involved in both acting and dance.

She graduated in 2001 from the all-girls Immaculate Heart Academy in Washington Township, Bergen County, New Jersey. In high school, she used her parents' video camera to record comedy skits together with a friend.

Wigfield graduated from Boston College in 2005, where she majored in theater and English.

== Career ==
After graduating, Wigfield moved back home and took an internship at CNN, then transferred to the page program at Late Show with David Letterman. She was then a production assistant on the short-lived television sitcom Knights of Prosperity.

Wigfield was hired as a writers' assistant on 30 Rock during the show's second season. She moved up to staff writer and then producer. From other writers, she was referred to the Upright Citizens Brigade theatre where she began performing and writing.

Wigfield and Tina Fey did much of the writing for the series finale of 30 Rock and the two went on to win the Primetime Emmy Award for Outstanding Writing for a Comedy Series for the episode, which aired on January 31, 2013.

After 30 Rock ended, Jack Burditt brought her to California to write for The Mindy Project, for which she and Mindy Kaling were co-executive producers. She appeared on the show as Dr. Lauren Neustadter. Wigfield created the NBC sitcom Great News, her first pilot, of which Fey is an executive producer. The series follows a producer at a news station whose mother begins an internship at the company.

== Personal life ==
Wigfield was raised Roman Catholic and today describes herself as a "Sorta Catholic." In a 2017 America magazine piece, she described being Catholic as "not a huge part of my deal... I practice what I call “Chipotle Catholicism”: I go down the line picking and choosing the parts of Catholicism that appeal to me (charity, Pope Frank, spooky stories about saints) in order to create a custom-made spiritual burrito."

Wigfield married comedy writer Adam Countee on May 21, 2016 in Manhattan. They have two daughters and a son.

== Filmography ==
Year	Title	Writer	Producer	Executive producer	Actress	Role	Notes	Network
2007	The Knights of Prosperity	No	No	No	Yes	Page #1		ABC
2009–2013	30 Rock	Yes	Yes	No	Yes	Herself		NBC
2013–2017	The Mindy Project	Yes	Yes	No	Yes	Dr. Lauren Neustadter	Producer of 10 episodes Writer of 15 episodes	Hulu
2017–2018	Great News	Yes	No	Yes	Yes	Beth Vierk	Creator/Executive Producer of 23 episodes Writer of 15 episodes	NBC
2019	Four Weddings and a Funeral	Yes	No	No	No			Hulu
2020–2021	Saved by the Bell	Yes	No	Yes	Yes	Valley High Principal Pat Krampus	Showrunner/Executive Producer of 20 episodes Writer of 3 episodes	Peacock
2025	The Four Seasons	Yes	No	Yes	No		Creator/Writer/Executive Producer	Netflix
