= Robert Carlock =

American screenwriter and producer

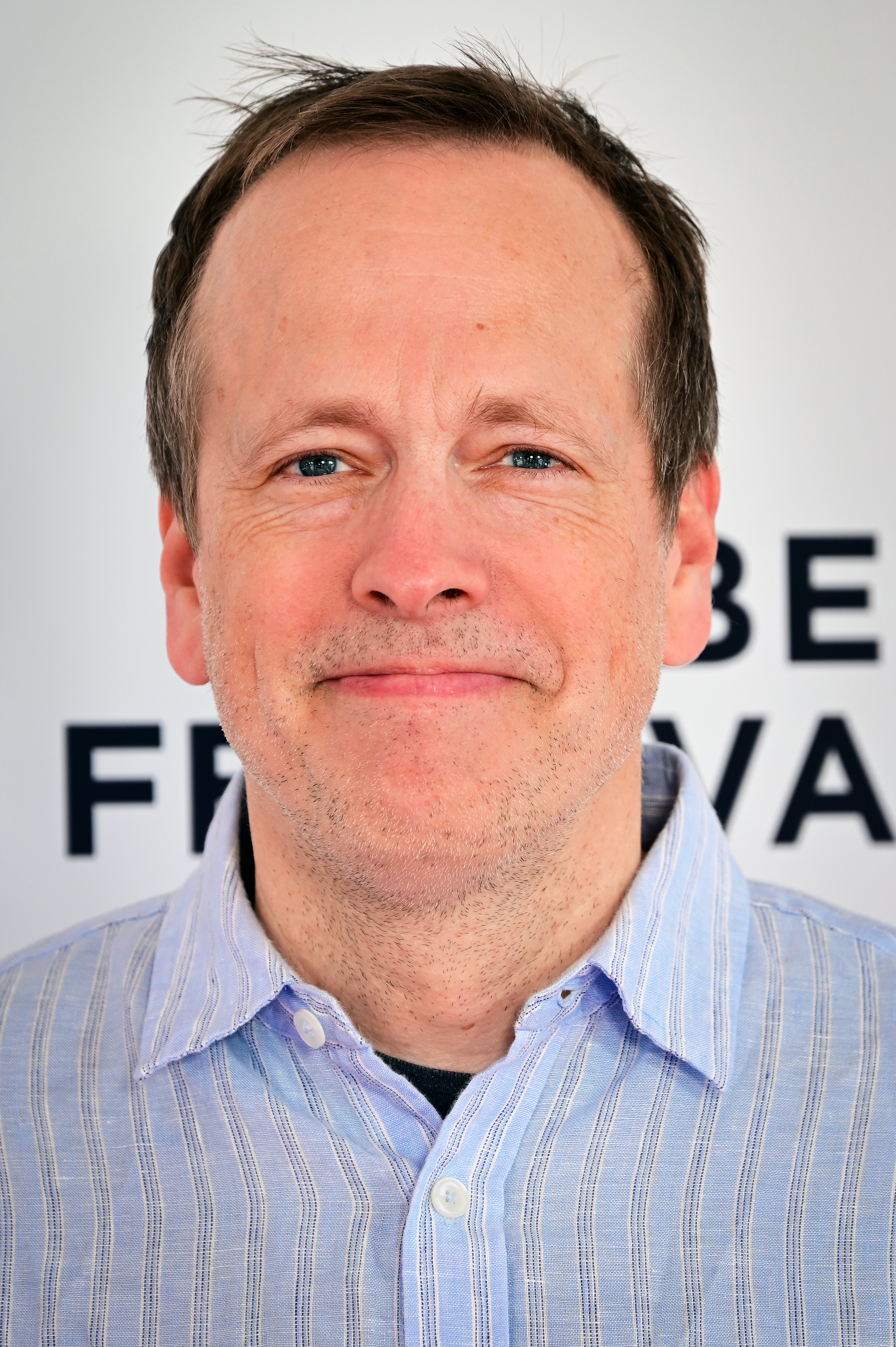
- Carlock in 2026
- Born: Robert Morgan Carlock; September 21, 1972 (age 53); Waltham, Massachusetts, U.S.
- Education: Harvard University (BA)
- Occupations: Screenwriter, producer
- Years active: 1996–present
- Spouse: Jennifer Nielsen Rogers (m. 2001)

Robert Morgan Carlock (born September 21, 1972) is an American screenwriter and producer. He has worked as a writer for several NBC television comedies, and as a showrunner for 30 Rock, which was created by his recurring collaborator, comedian Tina Fey. Carlock and Fey co-created the sitcoms Unbreakable Kimmy Schmidt, starring Ellie Kemper, and Mr. Mayor, starring Ted Danson.

== Early life ==
Carlock was born in Waltham, Massachusetts, the son of Martha and Roger Emery Carlock. Raised in Weston, Massachusetts, he graduated from Belmont Hill School in 1991 and cum laude from Harvard University in 1995, where he became president of the Fly Club, an all-male social club, and an editor for the Harvard Lampoon.

== Career ==
Carlock began writing for The Dana Carvey Show in 1996. Following that, he was a member of the writing staff of Saturday Night Live from 1996 to 2001, contributing to 99 episodes of the show. One of his notable SNL sketches was NPR's Delicious Dish with Ana Gasteyer and Molly Shannon. In 2011, Ben and Jerry's released a new ice cream flavor based on the sketch written by Carlock and named it "Schweddy Balls".

Carlock left SNL in 2001 to write for Friends in Los Angeles, working on the show until 2004 when he joined the staff of Friends spinoff Joey for two years. Carlock then moved back to New York to work on an "Untitled Tina Fey Project" in 2006, which became 30 Rock, which he wrote for and produced. He then worked on Fey's next sitcom, Unbreakable Kimmy Schmidt, which debuted in 2015. He also wrote the screenplay for Fey's film Whiskey Tango Foxtrot (2016).

Carlock has won several awards for his work on 30 Rock, including Primetime Emmys, Writers Guild of America Awards, and Producers Guild of America Awards, as well as being named one of the top 50 power showrunners of 2011.

In 2021, Carlock co-created the series Mr. Mayor with Fey which premiered on NBC on January 7, 2021. The series has received generally positive reviews from critics. In April 2021, the series was renewed for a second season.

The Fall and Rise of Reggie Dinkins, which Carlock created with Sam Means, premiered in January 2026 to positive reviews and 5.8 million viewers.

== Personal life ==
On December 31, 2001, Carlock married Jennifer Nielsen Rogers, a Wellesley graduate and former CNNfn producer/reporter. Rogers now works as an anchor for Yahoo Finance. She was previously an anchor and reporter for Reuters TV.

== Filmography ==
=== Television ===
Year	Title	Writer	Producer	Executive producer	Notes	Network
1996	The Dana Carvey Show	Yes	No	No		ABC
1996–2001	Saturday Night Live	Yes	No	No		NBC
2001–2004	Friends	Yes	Yes	No		NBC
2004–2006	Joey	Yes	No	co-executive		NBC
2006–2013, 2020	30 Rock	Yes	No	Yes		NBC
2014	Mulaney	No	No	Yes		Fox
2015–2020	Unbreakable Kimmy Schmidt	Yes	No	Yes		Netflix
2017–2018	Great News	Yes	No	Yes		NBC
2021–2022	Mr. Mayor	Yes	No	Yes		NBC
2021–2024	Girls5eva	Yes	No	Yes		Peacock/Netflix
2023–2024	Mulligan	Yes	No	Yes		Netflix
2026–present	The Fall and Rise of Reggie Dinkins	Yes	Yes	Yes	Episodes: "Pilot", "You May Hug Your Hero", "Dr. Watson's Dad", and "A Real Cinderella Story"	NBC

=== Film ===
- Whiskey Tango Foxtrot (2016)

== Awards and nominations ==
In addition to winning three Emmy Awards for Outstanding Comedy Series, Carlock has been nominated for the Emmys for writing for a comedy four times. He has won multiple Producers’ Guild and Writers’ Guild Awards as well as recognition from the American Film Institute. His work on 30 Rock also garnered Carlock a Peabody Award, a Television Critics Association Award, a GLAAD Award, a Gold Plaque from the Hugo Television Awards, a Golden Nymph from the Monaco Film and Television Festival, a Bravo A-List Award, a Comedy Central Comedy Award, and a Golden Globe.

The following awards are categorized under the year they were announced (and not necessarily the year covered by the award ceremony).

Year	Award	Category	Work	Result
2001	Emmy Award	Writing for a Variety, Music or Comedy Program	Saturday Night Live	Nominated
2001	WGA Award	Comedy/Variety Series	Saturday Night Live	Nominated
2002	WGA Award	Comedy/Variety Series	Saturday Night Live	Nominated
2003	WGA Award	Comedy/Variety Special	Saturday Night Live: NBC 75th Anniversary Special	Nominated
2007	WGA Award	Comedy Series	30 Rock	Nominated
2007	WGA Award	New Series	30 Rock	Nominated
2007	Emmy Award	Outstanding Comedy Series	30 Rock	Won
2007	Emmy Award	Outstanding Writing for a Comedy Series	30 Rock: for episode "Jack-Tor".	Nominated
2008	WGA Award	Comedy Series	30 Rock	Won
2008	PGA Award	Television Producer of the Year Award in Episodic Comedy	30 Rock	Won
2008	Emmy Award	Outstanding Comedy Series	30 Rock	Won
2008	Emmy Award	Outstanding Writing for a Variety, Music, or Comedy Program	Saturday Night Live	Nominated
2009	WGA Award	Episodic Comedy	30 Rock	Nominated
2009	WGA Award	Comedy/Variety Series	Saturday Night Live	Won
2009	WGA Award	Comedy Series	30 Rock	Won
2009	PGA Award	Television Producer of the Year Award in Episodic Comedy	30 Rock	Won
2009	Emmy Award	Outstanding Writing for a Comedy Series	30 Rock: for episode "Apollo, Apollo"	Nominated
2009	Emmy Award	Outstanding Writing for a Comedy Series	30 Rock: for episode "Kidney Now!"	Nominated
2009	Emmy Award	Outstanding Comedy Series	30 Rock	Won
2010	WGA Award	Episodic Comedy	30 Rock	Won
2010	WGA Award	Comedy Series	30 Rock	Won
2010	PGA Award	Television Producer of the Year Award in Episodic Comedy	30 Rock	Won
2010	Emmy Award	Outstanding Comedy Series	30 Rock	Nominated
2011	WGA Award	Comedy Series	30 Rock	Nominated
2011	WGA Award	Episodic Comedy	30 Rock	Won
2011	PGA Award	Television Producer of the Year Award in Episodic Comedy	30 Rock	Won
2011	Emmy Award	Outstanding Comedy Series	30 Rock	Nominated
2012	WGA Award	Comedy Series	30 Rock	Nominated
2012	PGA Award	Television Producer of the Year Award in Episodic Comedy	30 Rock	Nominated
2012	Emmy Award	Outstanding Comedy Series	30 Rock	Nominated
2013	Emmy Award	Outstanding Comedy Series	30 Rock	Nominated
2013	Emmy Award	Outstanding Writing for a Comedy Series	30 Rock: for episode "Hogcock!"	Nominated
2013	Emmy Award	Outstanding Writing For A Variety Special	Golden Globe Awards	Nominated
2014	Emmy Award	Outstanding Writing For A Variety Special	Golden Globe Awards	Nominated
2015	Emmy Award	Outstanding Writing For A Variety Special	Golden Globe Awards	Nominated
2015	Emmy Award	Outstanding Comedy Series	Unbreakable Kimmy Schmidt	Nominated
2015	WGA Award	New Series	Unbreakable Kimmy Schmidt	Nominated
2015	WGA Award	Comedy Series	Unbreakable Kimmy Schmidt	Nominated
2016	Emmy Award	Outstanding Comedy Series	Unbreakable Kimmy Schmidt	Nominated
2016	Critics' Choice Television Awards	Comedy Series	Unbreakable Kimmy Schmidt	Nominated
2016	WGA Award Award	Comedy Series	Unbreakable Kimmy Schmidt	Nominated
2016	WGA Award Award	Episodic Comedy	Unbreakable Kimmy Schmidt	Won
2016	WGA Award Award	Episodic Comedy	Unbreakable Kimmy Schmidt	Nominated
2017	Emmy Award	Outstanding Comedy Series	Unbreakable Kimmy Schmidt	Nominated
2018	Emmy Award	Outstanding Comedy Series	Unbreakable Kimmy Schmidt	Nominated
2018	WGA Award	Episodic Comedy	Unbreakable Kimmy Schmidt	Won
2020	Emmy Award	Outstanding Television Movie	Unbreakable Kimmy Schmidt: Kimmy vs the Reverend	Nominated
