= Live Show (disambiguation) =

"Live Show" is a live television episode of the American series 30 Rock.

Live Show may also refer to:

- Live television
- Live Show (film), a 2000 Filipino film

== See also ==
- "Live from Studio 6H" another live episode of 30 Rock that aired in 2012
