= List of 30 Rock episodes =

The logo of the series.

30 Rock is an American satirical television sitcom that was broadcast on NBC. Created by Tina Fey, the single-camera television series follows the lives of the head writer of The Girlie Show with Tracy Jordan (TGS), Liz Lemon (Tina Fey), the other staff members of TGS, and their network executive, Jack Donaghy (Alec Baldwin).

30 Rock was a critical success, winning several major awards (including Primetime Emmy Awards for Outstanding Comedy Series in 2007, 2008, and 2009), and achieving the top ranking on many critics' year-end best of 2006 and 2007 lists. In 2009, 30 Rock broke the record for most Primetime Emmy nominations in a single year for a comedy series with 22. Despite the acclaim, the series struggled in the ratings throughout its run. It broadcast a total of 138 episodes over seven seasons, from October 11, 2006, to January 31, 2013. In addition, a special episode premiered on July 16, 2020.

== Series overview ==
Season	Episodes	Originally released	
Season	Episodes	First released	Last released
1	21	October 11, 2006	April 26, 2007
2	15	October 4, 2007	May 8, 2008
3	22	October 30, 2008	May 14, 2009
4	22	October 15, 2009	May 20, 2010
5	23	September 23, 2010	May 5, 2011
6	22	January 12, 2012	May 17, 2012
7	13	October 4, 2012	January 31, 2013
Special		July 16, 2020	

== Episodes ==
=== Season 1 (2006–07) ===
The first season of 30 Rock premiered on NBC on October 11, 2006, and concluded on April 26, 2007.

No. overall	No. in season	Title	Directed by	Written by	Original release date	Prod. code	U.S. viewers (millions)
1	1	"Pilot"	Adam Bernstein	Tina Fey	October 11, 2006	101	8.13
2	2	"The Aftermath"	Adam Bernstein	Tina Fey	October 18, 2006	102	5.71
3	3	"Blind Date"	Adam Bernstein	John Riggi	October 25, 2006	103	6.01
4	4	"Jack the Writer"	Gail Mancuso	Robert Carlock	November 1, 2006	104	4.61
5	5	"Jack-Tor"	Don Scardino	Robert Carlock	November 16, 2006	107	5.19
6	6	"Jack Meets Dennis"	Juan J. Campanella	Jack Burditt	November 30, 2006	105	5.97
7	7	"Tracy Does Conan"	Adam Bernstein	Tina Fey	December 7, 2006	108	6.84
8	8	"The Break-Up"	Scott Ellis	Dave Finkel & Brett Baer	December 14, 2006	109	5.94
9	9	"The Baby Show"	Michael Engler	Jack Burditt	January 4, 2007	110	5.89
10	10	"The Rural Juror"	Beth McCarthy	Matt Hubbard	January 11, 2007	111	6.01
11	11	"The Head and the Hair"	Gail Mancuso	Tina Fey & John Riggi	January 18, 2007	112	5.04
12	12	"Black Tie"	Don Scardino	Kay Cannon & Tina Fey	February 1, 2007	113	5.71
13	13	"Up All Night"	Michael Engler	Tina Fey	February 8, 2007	114	5.17
14	14	"The C Word"	Adam Bernstein	Tina Fey	February 15, 2007	106	5.01
15	15	"Hard Ball"	Don Scardino	Matt Hubbard	February 22, 2007	115	4.61
16	16	"The Source Awards"	Don Scardino	Robert Carlock & Daisy Gardner	March 1, 2007	116	5.74
17	17	"The Fighting Irish"	Dennie Gordon	Jack Burditt	March 8, 2007	117	5.15
18	18	"Fireworks"	Beth McCarthy	Dave Finkel & Brett Baer	April 5, 2007	118	5.37
19	19	"Corporate Crush"	Don Scardino	John Riggi	April 12, 2007	119	5.07
20	20	"Cleveland"	Paul Feig	Jack Burditt & Robert Carlock	April 19, 2007	120	5.16
21	21	"Hiatus"	Don Scardino	Tina Fey	April 26, 2007	121	4.72

=== Season 2 (2007–08) ===
The second season of 30 Rock was intended to be 22 episodes, but due to the 2007–08 Writers Guild of America strike, the final seven episodes were scrapped.

No. overall	No. in season	Title	Directed by	Written by	Original release date	Prod. code	U.S. viewers (millions)
22	1	"SeinfeldVision"	Don Scardino	Tina Fey	October 4, 2007	201	7.33
23	2	"Jack Gets in the Game"	Michael Engler	Robert Carlock	October 11, 2007	202	6.60
24	3	"The Collection"	Don Scardino	Matt Hubbard	October 18, 2007	203	6.22
25	4	"Rosemary's Baby"	Michael Engler	Jack Burditt	October 25, 2007	204	6.50
26	5	"Greenzo"	Don Scardino	Jon Pollack	November 8, 2007	205	6.60
27	6	"Somebody to Love"	Beth McCarthy	Tina Fey & Kay Cannon	November 15, 2007	206	6.45
28	7	"Cougars"	Michael Engler	John Riggi	November 29, 2007	207	5.82
29	8	"Secrets and Lies"	Michael Engler	Ron Weiner	December 6, 2007	208	5.84
30	9	"Ludachristmas"	Don Scardino	Tami Sagher	December 13, 2007	209	5.58
31	10	Episode 210	Richard Shepard	Robert Carlock & Donald Glover	January 10, 2008	210	5.98
32	11	"MILF Island"	Kevin Rodney Sullivan	Tina Fey & Matt Hubbard	April 10, 2008	212	5.77
33	12	"Subway Hero"	Don Scardino	Jack Burditt & Robert Carlock	April 17, 2008	211	6.50
34	13	"Succession"	Gail Mancuso	Andrew Guest & John Riggi	April 24, 2008	213	5.52
35	14	"Sandwich Day"	Don Scardino	Robert Carlock & Jack Burditt	May 1, 2008	214	5.38
36	15	"Cooter"	Don Scardino	Tina Fey	May 8, 2008	215	5.45

=== Season 3 (2008–09) ===
No. overall	No. in season	Title	Directed by	Written by	Original release date	Prod. code	U.S. viewers (millions)
37	1	"Do-Over"	Don Scardino	Tina Fey	October 30, 2008	301	8.66
38	2	"Believe in the Stars"	Don Scardino	Robert Carlock	November 6, 2008	302	8.07
39	3	"The One with the Cast of Night Court"	Gail Mancuso	Jack Burditt	November 13, 2008	303	7.60
40	4	"Gavin Volure"	Gail Mancuso	John Riggi	November 20, 2008	304	7.08
41	5	"Reunion"	Beth McCarthy	Matt Hubbard	December 4, 2008	305	7.18
42	6	"Christmas Special"	Don Scardino	Kay Cannon & Tina Fey	December 11, 2008	306	7.38
43	7	"Señor Macho Solo"	Beth McCarthy	Ron Weiner	January 8, 2009	307	5.37
44	8	"Flu Shot"	Don Scardino	Jon Pollack	January 15, 2009	308	6.63
45	9	"Retreat to Move Forward"	Steve Buscemi	Tami Sagher	January 22, 2009	309	6.41
46	10	"Generalissimo"	Todd Holland	Robert Carlock	February 5, 2009	310	6.39
47	11	"St. Valentine's Day"	Don Scardino	Jack Burditt & Tina Fey	February 12, 2009	311	7.68
48	12	"Larry King"	Constantine Makris	Matt Hubbard	February 26, 2009	312	6.36
49	13	"Goodbye, My Friend"	John Riggi	Ron Weiner	March 5, 2009	313	7.25
50	14	"The Funcooker"	Ken Whittingham	Donald Glover & Tom Ceraulo	March 12, 2009	314	6.43
51	15	"The Bubble"	Tricia Brock	Tina Fey	March 19, 2009	315	7.13
52	16	"Apollo, Apollo"	Millicent Shelton	Robert Carlock	March 26, 2009	316	7.17
53	17	"Cutbacks"	Gail Mancuso	Matt Hubbard	April 9, 2009	317	6.81
54	18	"Jackie Jormp-Jomp"	Don Scardino	Kay Cannon & Tracey Wigfield	April 16, 2009	318	7.32
55	19	"The Ones"	Beth McCarthy	Jack Burditt	April 23, 2009	319	6.30
56	20	"The Natural Order"	Scott Ellis	John Riggi & Tina Fey	April 30, 2009	320	5.95
57	21	"Mamma Mia"	Don Scardino	Ron Weiner	May 7, 2009	321	6.13
58	22	"Kidney Now!"	Don Scardino	Jack Burditt & Robert Carlock	May 14, 2009	322	5.70

=== Season 4 (2009–10) ===
No. overall	No. in season	Title	Directed by	Written by	Original release date	Prod. code	U.S. viewers (millions)
59	1	"Season 4"	Don Scardino	Tina Fey	October 15, 2009	401	6.39
60	2	"Into the Crevasse"	Beth McCarthy Miller	Robert Carlock	October 22, 2009	402	6.84
61	3	"Stone Mountain"	Don Scardino	John Riggi	October 29, 2009	403	6.10
62	4	"Audition Day"	Beth McCarthy Miller	Matt Hubbard	November 5, 2009	404	6.15
63	5	"The Problem Solvers"	John Riggi	Ron Weiner	November 12, 2009	405	6.00
64	6	"Sun Tea"	Gail Mancuso	Josh Siegal & Dylan Morgan	November 19, 2009	406	5.72
65	7	"Dealbreakers Talk Show #0001"	Don Scardino	Kay Cannon	December 3, 2009	407	6.08
66	8	"Secret Santa"	Beth McCarthy Miller	Tina Fey	December 10, 2009	408	6.70
67	9	"Klaus and Greta"	Gail Mancuso	Robert Carlock	January 14, 2010	409	5.12
68	10	"Black Light Attack!"	Don Scardino	Steve Hely	January 14, 2010	410	4.98
69	11	"Winter Madness"	Beth McCarthy Miller	Vali Chandrasekaran & Tom Ceraulo	January 21, 2010	411	5.54
70	12	"Verna"	Don Scardino	Ron Weiner	February 4, 2010	412	5.79
71	13	"Anna Howard Shaw Day"	Ken Whittingham	Matt Hubbard	February 11, 2010	413	6.00
72	14	"Future Husband"	Don Scardino	Tracey Wigfield & Jon Haller	March 11, 2010	414	5.77
73	15	"Don Geiss, America and Hope"	Stephen Lee Davis	Jack Burditt & Tracey Wigfield	March 18, 2010	415	6.79
74	16	"Floyd"	Millicent Shelton	Paula Pell	March 25, 2010	416	6.25
75	17	"Lee Marvin vs. Derek Jeter"	Don Scardino	Kay Cannon & Tina Fey	April 22, 2010	417	4.00
76	18	"Khonani"	Beth McCarthy Miller	Vali Chandrasekaran	April 22, 2010	418	5.16
77	19	"Argus"	Jeff Richmond	Josh Siegal, Dylan Morgan & Paula Pell	April 29, 2010	419	5.44
78	20	"The Moms"	John Riggi	Kay Cannon & Robert Carlock	May 6, 2010	420	5.42
79	21	"Emanuelle Goes to Dinosaur Land"	Beth McCarthy Miller	Matt Hubbard	May 13, 2010	421	4.96
80	22	"I Do Do"	Don Scardino	Tina Fey	May 20, 2010	422	5.36

=== Season 5 (2010–11) ===
No. overall	No. in season	Title	Directed by	Written by	Original release date	Prod. code	U.S. viewers (millions)
81	1	"The Fabian Strategy"	Beth McCarthy-Miller	Tina Fey	September 23, 2010	501	5.91
82	2	"When It Rains, It Pours"	Don Scardino	Robert Carlock	September 30, 2010	502	5.68
83	3	"Let's Stay Together"	John Riggi	Jack Burditt	October 7, 2010	503	4.90
84	4	"Live Show"	Beth McCarthy-Miller	Robert Carlock & Tina Fey	October 14, 2010	504	6.70
85	5	"Reaganing"	Todd Holland	Matt Hubbard	October 21, 2010	505	5.18
86	6	"Gentleman's Intermission"	Don Scardino	John Riggi	November 4, 2010	506	5.31
87	7	"Brooklyn Without Limits"	Michael Engler	Ron Weiner	November 11, 2010	507	5.09
88	8	"College"	Don Scardino	Josh Siegal & Dylan Morgan	November 18, 2010	508	5.11
89	9	"Chain Reaction of Mental Anguish"	Ken Whittingham	Kay Cannon	December 2, 2010	509	5.03
90	10	"Christmas Attack Zone"	John Riggi	Tracey Wigfield	December 9, 2010	510	4.76
91	11	"Mrs. Donaghy"	Tricia Brock	Jack Burditt	January 20, 2011	511	5.34
92	12	"Operation Righteous Cowboy Lightning"	Beth McCarthy-Miller	Robert Carlock	January 27, 2011	512	4.92
93	13	"¡Qué Sorpresa!"	John Riggi	Matt Hubbard	February 3, 2011	513	4.78
94	14	"Double-Edged Sword"	Don Scardino	Kay Cannon & Tom Ceraulo	February 10, 2011	514	4.59
95	15	"It's Never Too Late for Now"	John Riggi	Vali Chandrasekaran	February 17, 2011	515	4.07
96	16	"TGS Hates Women"	Beth McCarthy-Miller	Ron Weiner	February 24, 2011	516	4.50
97	17	"Queen of Jordan"	Ken Whittingham	Tracey Wigfield	March 17, 2011	517	4.19
98	18	"Plan B"	Jeff Richmond	Josh Siegal & Dylan Morgan	March 24, 2011	518	4.36
99	19	"I Heart Connecticut"	Stephen Lee Davis	Vali Chandrasekaran & Jon Haller	April 14, 2011	519	4.45
100	20	"100"	Don Scardino	Jack Burditt & Robert Carlock & Tina Fey	April 21, 2011	520	4.60
101	21	"100"	Don Scardino	Jack Burditt & Robert Carlock & Tina Fey	April 21, 2011	521	4.60
102	22	"Everything Sunny All the Time Always"	John Riggi	Kay Cannon & Matt Hubbard	April 28, 2011	522	3.95
103	23	"Respawn"	Don Scardino	Hannibal Buress & Ron Weiner	May 5, 2011	523	4.20

=== Season 6 (2012) ===
No. overall	No. in season	Title	Directed by	Written by	Original release date	Prod. code	U.S. viewers (millions)
104	1	"Dance Like Nobody's Watching"	John Riggi	Tina Fey & Tracey Wigfield	January 12, 2012	601	4.47
105	2	"Idiots Are People Two!"	Beth McCarthy-Miller	Robert Carlock	January 19, 2012	602	4.05
106	3	"Idiots Are People Three!"	Beth McCarthy-Miller	Robert Carlock	January 26, 2012	603	3.82
107	4	"The Ballad of Kenneth Parcell"	Jeff Richmond	Matt Hubbard	January 26, 2012	604	3.98
108	5	"Today You Are a Man"	Jeff Richmond	Ron Weiner	February 2, 2012	605	3.23
109	6	"Hey, Baby, What's Wrong"	Michael Engler	Kay Cannon	February 9, 2012	606	3.88
110	7	"Hey, Baby, What's Wrong"	Michael Engler	Kay Cannon	February 9, 2012	607	3.88
111	8	"The Tuxedo Begins"	John Riggi	Dylan Morgan & Josh Siegal	February 16, 2012	608	3.59
112	9	"Leap Day"	Steve Buscemi	Luke Del Tredici	February 23, 2012	609	3.70
113	10	"Alexis Goodlooking and the Case of the Missing Whisky"	Michael Slovis	John Riggi	March 1, 2012	610	3.77
114	11	"Standards and Practices"	Beth McCarthy-Miller	Vali Chandrasekaran	March 8, 2012	611	3.42
115	12	"St. Patrick's Day"	John Riggi	Colleen McGuinness	March 15, 2012	612	4.00
116	13	"Grandmentor"	Beth McCarthy-Miller	Sam Means	March 22, 2012	613	3.31
117	14	"Kidnapped by Danger"	Claire Cowperthwaite	Tina Fey	March 22, 2012	614	3.42
118	15	"The Shower Principle"	Stephen Lee Davis	Tom Ceraulo	March 29, 2012	615	3.14
119	16	"Nothing Left to Lose"	John Riggi	Lauren Gurganous & Nina Pedrad	April 5, 2012	616	2.79
120	17	"Meet the Woggels!"	Linda Mendoza	Ron Weiner	April 12, 2012	617	2.98
121	18	"Murphy Brown Lied to Us"	John Riggi	Robert Carlock & Vali Chandrasekaran	April 19, 2012	618	3.06
122	19	"Live from Studio 6H"	Beth McCarthy Miller	Jack Burditt & Tina Fey	April 26, 2012	619	3.47
123	20	"Queen of Jordan 2: Mystery of the Phantom Pooper"	Ken Whittingham	Luke Del Tredici & Tracey Wigfield	May 3, 2012	620	3.04
124	21	"The Return of Avery Jessup"	John Riggi	Dylan Morgan & Josh Siegal	May 10, 2012	621	2.92
125	22	"What Will Happen to the Gang Next Year?"	Michael Engler	Matt Hubbard	May 17, 2012	622	2.84

=== Season 7 (2012–13) ===
No. overall	No. in season	Title	Directed by	Written by	Original release date	Prod. code	U.S. viewers (millions)
126	1	"The Beginning of the End"	Don Scardino	Jack Burditt	October 4, 2012	701	3.46
127	2	"Governor Dunston"	Robert Carlock	Robert Carlock	October 11, 2012	702	3.40
128	3	"Stride of Pride"	Michael Engler	Tina Fey	October 18, 2012	703	3.04
129	4	"Unwindulax"	James E. Sheridan	Matt Hubbard	October 25, 2012	704	3.13
130	5	"There's No I in America"	John Riggi	Josh Siegal & Dylan Morgan	October 31, 2012	705	3.38
131	6	"Aunt Phatso vs. Jack Donaghy"	Don Scardino	Luke Del Tredici	November 15, 2012	706	3.34
132	7	"Mazel Tov, Dummies!"	Beth McCarthy-Miller	Tracey Wigfield	November 29, 2012	707	3.61
133	8	"My Whole Life Is Thunder"	Linda Mendoza	Jack Burditt & Colleen McGuinness	December 6, 2012	708	3.22
134	9	"Game Over"	Ken Whittingham	Robert Carlock & Sam Means	January 10, 2013	710	3.79
135	10	"Florida"	Claire Cowperthwaite	Tom Ceraulo & Matt Hubbard	January 17, 2013	709	3.44
136	11	"A Goon's Deed in a Weary World"	Jeff Richmond	Lang Fisher & Nina Pedrad	January 24, 2013	711	3.81
137	12	"Hogcock!"	Beth McCarthy-Miller	Jack Burditt & Robert Carlock	January 31, 2013	712	4.88
138	13	"Last Lunch"	Beth McCarthy-Miller	Tina Fey & Tracey Wigfield	January 31, 2013	713	4.88

=== Special episode (2020) ===
Title	Directed by	Written by	Original release date	U.S. viewers (millions)
"30 Rock: A One-Time Special"	Oz Rodriguez	Tina Fey & Robert Carlock	July 16, 2020	0.88
Some time after the finale of TGS, Jack calls Liz to get the gang back together for a TGS reboot. The gang virtually reunites to pitch it to Kenneth, but he refuses, citing their refused virtual invitations from him. Throughout the episode, promotions are made for several NBCUniversal properties, including Peacock, Universal Destinations & Experiences, Telemundo, NBC News, Tokyo 2020, as well as upcoming new shows for the 2020–21 television season.

== Ratings ==
Season	Timeslot (ET)	Premiered		Ended		TV Season	Rank	Viewers (in millions)
Season	Timeslot (ET)	Date	Premiere Viewers (in millions)	Date	Finale Viewers (in millions)	TV Season	Rank	Viewers (in millions)
1	Wednesday 8:00 pm (October 11 – November 1, 2006) Thursday 9:30 pm (November 16, 2006 – March 8, 2007) Thursday 9:00 pm (April 5–26, 2007)	October 11, 2006	8.13	April 26, 2007	4.72	2006–2007	#102	5.8
2	Thursday 8:30 pm (October 4, 2007 – April 17, 2008) Thursday 9:00 pm (December 13, 2007) Thursday 9:30 pm (April 24 – May 8, 2008)	October 4, 2007	7.33	May 8, 2008	5.45	2007–2008	#111	6.5
3	Thursday 9:30 pm (October 30, 2008 – May 14, 2009)	October 30, 2008	8.66	May 14, 2009	5.70	2008–2009	#69	7.5
4	Thursday 9:30 pm (October 15, 2009 – May 20, 2010) Thursday 9:00 pm (January 14, 2010) Thursday 8:30 pm (April 22, 2010)	October 15, 2009	6.39	May 20, 2010	5.36	2009–2010	#86	5.9
5	Thursday 8:30 pm (September 23 – December 9, 2010) Thursday 10:00 pm (January 20 – May 5, 2011) Thursday 10:30 pm (April 28, 2011)	September 23, 2010	5.91	May 5, 2011	4.20	2010–2011	#106	5.3
6	Thursday 8:00 pm (January 12 – March 8, 2012) Thursday 9:00 pm (January 26, 2012) Thursday 8:30 pm (March 15 – May 17, 2012)	January 12, 2012	4.47	May 17, 2012	2.84	2011–2012	#130	4.6
7	Thursday 8:00 pm (October 4, 2012 – January 31, 2013) Wednesday 8:00 pm (October 31, 2012)	October 4, 2012	3.46	January 31, 2013	4.88	2012–2013	#99	4.6
