= 30 Rock season 6 =

Season of television series

30 Rock
- Season 6
- DVD cover
- Starring: Tina Fey; Tracy Morgan; Jane Krakowski; Jack McBrayer; Scott Adsit; Judah Friedlander; Alec Baldwin; Katrina Bowden; Keith Powell; Kevin Brown; Grizz Chapman; John Lutz
- No. of episodes: 22

Release
- Original network: NBC
- Original release: January 12 – May 17, 2012

Season chronology
- ← Previous; Season 5 Next → Season 7

The sixth season of 30 Rock, an American television comedy series on the NBC network in the United States, began airing on January 12, 2012. 30 Rock was renewed for a sixth season by NBC on November 15, 2010. The season began airing mid-season to accommodate Tina Fey's pregnancy. On November 14, 2011, NBC announced that 30 Rock would return at the new time of 8:00 pm.

This season was initially expected to be Alec Baldwin's last, as he had announced he would be looking to expand into other forms of media. However, in January 2012, Baldwin confirmed that he would remain for the seventh and final season of 30 Rock. Season six received positive reviews and 13 Emmy Award nominations.

== Synopsis ==
The story arcs of season six include: Liz has a new relationship and emotionally matures; Jack continues to attempt to recover his wife from North Korea and find his identity at Kabletown; Kenneth moves up (and later down) the corporate ladder; and Jenna reaches a new level of fame thanks to being a judge on a reality show, and considers settling down with boyfriend Paul.

== Cast ==
Tina Fey portrays Liz Lemon, the head writer of a fictional live sketch-comedy television series TGS. The TGS cast consists of two main actors. The lead actor is the loose cannon movie star Tracy Jordan, portrayed by Tracy Morgan. His co-star is the extremely narcissistic Jenna Maroney, portrayed by Jane Krakowski. Jack McBrayer plays the naïve NBC page, and later janitor, Kenneth Parcell. Scott Adsit acts as the witty and wise TGS producer, Pete Hornberger. Judah Friedlander portrays trucker hat-wearing staff writer Frank Rossitano. Alec Baldwin plays the NBC network executive Jack Donaghy. Donaghy's full corporate title for the majority of the season is "Head of East Coast Television and Microwave Oven Programming". Keith Powell plays the Harvard University alumnus and TGS staff writer James "Toofer" Spurlock. Katrina Bowden acts as writers' assistant Cerie Xerox. Other cast members include Grizz Chapman as Grizz Griswold, Kevin Brown as "Dot Com" Slattery, and John Lutz as J.D. Lutz. The cast for the season will also feature recurring guest stars Kristen Schaal as Hazel Wassername, a new NBC page who looks up to Liz, and James Marsden as Criss, Liz's new boyfriend.

=== Main cast ===
- Tina Fey as Liz Lemon, the head writer of TGS, a live sketch comedy television show. (22 episodes)
- Tracy Morgan as Tracy Jordan, a loose cannon movie star and cast member of TGS. (22 episodes)
- Jane Krakowski as Jenna Maroney, a vain, fame-obsessed TGS cast member and Liz's best friend. (22 episodes)
- Jack McBrayer as Kenneth Parcell, a naïve, television-loving NBC page, and later janitor from Georgia. (22 episodes)
- Scott Adsit as Pete Hornberger, the witty and wise producer of TGS. (14 episodes)
- Judah Friedlander as Frank Rossitano, an immature staff writer for TGS. (18 episodes)
- Alec Baldwin as Jack Donaghy, a high-flying NBC network executive and Liz's mentor. (22 episodes)
- Katrina Bowden as Cerie Xerox, the young, attractive TGS general assistant. (6 episodes)
- Keith Powell as James "Toofer" Spurlock, a proud African-American staff writer for TGS. (11 episodes)
- Kevin Brown as Walter "Dot Com" Slattery, a member of Tracy's entourage. (9 episodes)
- Grizz Chapman as Warren "Grizz" Griswold, a member of Tracy's entourage. (9 episodes)
- John Lutz as J.D. Lutz, a lazy, overweight TGS writer who is often ridiculed by his co-workers. (11 episodes)

=== Recurring cast ===
- James Marsden as Criss Chros, an unemployed entrepreneur and Liz's new boyfriend. (9 episodes)
- Kristen Schaal as Hazel Wassername, a new NBC page who becomes obsessed with Liz. (8 episodes)
- Thomas Roberts as himself (5 episodes)
- Mary Steenburgen as Diana Jessup, Avery's steely mother who is romantically attracted to Jack. (5 episodes)
- Will Forte as Paul L'astnamé, Jenna's boyfriend who also happens to be a Jenna Maroney impersonator. (4 episodes)
- Chris Parnell as Dr. Leo Spaceman, a physician who practices questionable medical techniques. (4 episodes)
- Hannibal Buress as Hannibal, a homeless man. (3 episodes)
- Sue Galloway as Sue LaRoche-Van der Hout, a TGS writer from the Netherlands. (3 episodes)
- Ken Howard as Hank Hooper, the owner of the fictional company Kabletown and Jack's boss. (3 episodes)
- Subhas Ramsaywack as Subhas, a janitor working at 30 Rockefeller Plaza. (3 episodes)
- Dean Winters as Dennis Duffy, Liz's immature ex-boyfriend. (3 episodes)

=== Guest stars ===
- Elizabeth Banks as Avery Jessup, Jack's wife who was kidnapped by North Korea. (2 episodes)
- Tituss Burgess as D'Fwan, reality television star and judge on the fictional talent show America's Kidz Got Singing. (2 episodes)
- Billy Bush as himself (2 episodes)
- Margaret Cho as Kim Jong-Il/Kim Jong-Un, the North Korean dictators. (2 episodes)
- Jimmy Fallon as himself/young Jack (2 episodes)
- Kelsey Grammer as himself (2 episodes)
- Matt Lauer as himself (2 episodes)
- Michael Mosley as Scott Scottsman, a sports journalist who was kidnapped by North Korea along with Avery. (2 episodes)
- Denise Richards as herself (2 episodes)
- Fred Armisen as various characters (Episode: "Live from Studio 6H")
- Will Arnett as Devon Banks, Jack's nemesis. (Episode: "Idiots Are People Three!")
- William Baldwin as Lance Drake Mandrell, an actor who is portraying Jack in a television movie. (Episode: "Kidnapped by Danger")
- Steve Buscemi as Lenny Wosniak, a private investigator. (Episode: "The Tuxedo Begins")
- Nick Cannon as himself (Episode: "The Ballad of Kenneth Parcell")
- Jim Carrey as Dave Williams, the lead character in the fictional movie Leap Dave Williams. (Episode: "Leap Day")
- John Cullum as Leap Day William, a mythological holiday figure. (Episode: "Leap Day")
- Ann Curry as herself (Episode: "Idiots Are People Two!")
- Steve Earle as himself (Episode: "The Ballad of Kenneth Parcell")
- Mick Foley as Mankind, Jenna's friend. (Episode: "The Ballad of Kenneth Parcell")
- Ira Glass as himself (voice role) [Episode: "St. Patrick's Day"]
- Donald Glover as young Tracy (Episode: "Live from Studio 6H")
- Jon Hamm as various characters (Episode: "Live from Studio 6H")
- Marceline Hugot as Kathy Geiss, Don Geiss' socially awkward middle-aged daughter. (Episode: "Idiots Are People Three!")
- Cheyenne Jackson as Danny Baker, a TGS cast member. (Episode: "Live from Studio 6H")
- Kim Kardashian as herself (Episode: "Live from Studio 6H")
- Stacy Keach as himself (Episode: "Murphy Brown Lied to Us")
- Pat Kiernan as himself (Episode: "What Will Happen to the Gang Next Year?")
- Karolina Kurkova as herself (Episode: "Leap Day")
- Adriane Lenox as Sherry, a nanny hired by Jack to look after his daughter. (Episode: "Leap Day")
- Steve Little as Thad Wormald, Liz's former classmate who is now a billionaire. (Episode: "Leap Day")
- Patti LuPone as Sylvia Rossitano, Frank's stereotypical Italian-American mother. (Episode: "Alexis Goodlooking and the Case of the Missing Whisky")
- Andie MacDowell as Claire Williams, the wife of Dave Williams in the fictional movie Leap Dave Williams. (Episode: "Leap Day")
- Rachel Maddow as herself (Episode: "Meet the Woggles!")
- Paul McCartney as himself (Episode: "Live from Studio 6H")
- John McEnroe as himself (Episode: "Dance Like Nobody's Watching")
- Chloë Grace Moretz as Kaylie Hooper, Hank Hooper's cunning young granddaughter. (Episode: "Standards and Practices")
- Bobby Moynihan as Stewart Derr, the foreman of a couch factory purchased by Jack. (Episode: "Murphy Brown Lied to Us")
- Cynthia Nixon as herself (Episode: "Kidnapped by Danger")
- Amy Poehler as young Liz (Episode: "Live from Studio 6H")
- Suze Orman as herself (Episode: "Today You Are a Man")
- Al Roker as himself (Episode: "St. Patrick's Day")
- Andy Samberg as himself (Episode: "The Ballad of Kenneth Parcell")
- Susan Sarandon as Lynn Onkman, Frank's former teacher and girlfriend. (Episode: "Alexis Goodlooking and the Case of the Missing Whisky")
- Sherri Shepherd as Angie Jordan, Tracy's no-nonsense wife and reality television star. (Episode: "Queen of Jordan 2: Mystery of the Phantom Pooper")
- Emma Stone as herself (Episode: "The Ballad of Kenneth Parcell")
- Elaine Stritch as Colleen Donaghy, Jack's cold and overbearing mother. (Episode: "Meet the Woggles!")
- Stanley Tucci as Henry Warren, Jack's former colleague. (Episode: "Alexis Goodlooking and the Case of the Missing Whisky")
- Cornel West as himself (Episode: "What Will Happen to the Gang Next Year?")
- Brian Williams as David Brinkley, a news anchor. (Episode: "Live from Studio 6H")

== Episodes ==
No. overall	No. in season	Title	Directed by	Written by	Original release date	Prod. code	U.S. viewers (millions)
104	1	"Dance Like Nobody's Watching"	John Riggi	Tina Fey & Tracey Wigfield	January 12, 2012	601	4.47
Liz returns from holiday break with a new outlook that leaves her immune to Tracy's acting out over Jenna's new fame as a judge on America's Kidz Got Singing. Meanwhile, Kenneth prepares for the Rapture.
105	2	"Idiots Are People Two!"	Beth McCarthy-Miller	Robert Carlock	January 19, 2012	602	4.05
An uproar ensues after cellphone video of Tracy being offensive towards gays is posted online. Liz tries to hide all details of her new boyfriend from Jack, knowing she'll never secure his approval. Kenneth and Jenna call on Kelsey Grammer for a problem only the Best Friends Gang can solve.
106	3	"Idiots Are People Three!"	Beth McCarthy-Miller	Robert Carlock	January 26, 2012	603	3.82
Tracy goes on the offensive against Liz by coming to the defense of idiots. Jack faces another challenge from Devon Banks (Will Arnett) and meddles in Liz's relationship with Criss (James Marsden). Jenna and Kenneth get help from Kelsey Grammer in dealing with an unconscious Pete.
107	4	"The Ballad of Kenneth Parcell"	Jeff Richmond	Matt Hubbard	January 26, 2012	604	3.98
Liz looks for a new best friend after discovering that Jenna has traded their friendship for fame. Jack decides to end the page program in order to impress Hank Hooper (Ken Howard).
108	5	"Today You Are a Man"	Jeff Richmond	Ron Weiner	February 2, 2012	605	3.23
Liz and Jack argue over her contract. Kenneth is reassigned after being offended by his coworkers at TGS, and Tracy and Jenna's accountant hires them as entertainment at a bar mitzvah.
109	6	"Hey, Baby, What's Wrong"	Michael Engler	Kay Cannon	February 9, 2012	606	3.88
110	7	"Hey, Baby, What's Wrong"	Michael Engler	Kay Cannon	February 9, 2012	607	3.88
On Valentine's Day, Criss (James Marsden) and Liz search for a dining room table. Avery's mother (Mary Steenburgen) visits Jack. Jenna and Pete prepare for Jenna's first live performance on America's Kidz Got Singing. Tracy and Frank aid Lutz in looking for a Valentine's Day date.
111	8	"The Tuxedo Begins"	John Riggi	Dylan Morgan & Josh Siegal	February 16, 2012	608	3.59
Jack decides to run for mayor after being mugged. Liz puts her desires above the good of New York. Jenna and Paul (Will Forte) try to act like a normal couple.
112	9	"Leap Day"	Steve Buscemi	Luke Del Tredici	February 23, 2012	609	3.70
Jack learns to appreciate Leap Day while Tracy takes the writers to a restaurant to spend an almost-expired gift card. Liz and Jenna try to seduce an internet billionaire.
113	10	"Alexis Goodlooking and the Case of the Missing Whisky"	Michael Slovis	John Riggi	March 1, 2012	610	3.77
In order to hide his relationship with Lynn (Susan Sarandon) from his mother (Patti LuPone), Frank pretends to be Liz's boyfriend. Jack mentors Kenneth. Tracy and Jenna search for Pete's whisky.
114	11	"Standards and Practices"	Beth McCarthy-Miller	Vali Chandrasekaran	March 8, 2012	611	3.42
Liz refuses to acknowledge Kenneth's new power over TGS. Jenna concocts a new scheme to gain publicity. Jack must serve as parent to his nemesis, Kaylie Hooper (Chloë Grace Moretz).
115	12	"St. Patrick's Day"	John Riggi	Colleen McGuinness	March 15, 2012	612	4.00
Liz is cursed on St. Patrick's Day when ex-boyfriend Dennis (Dean Winters) shows up unexpectedly, interrupting her day with Criss (James Marsden).
116	13	"Grandmentor"	Beth McCarthy-Miller	Sam Means	March 22, 2012	613	3.31
Jack revamps his efforts to rescue his wife, while Liz agrees to mentor Hazel (Kristen Schaal).
117	14	"Kidnapped by Danger"	Claire Cowperthwaite	Tina Fey	March 22, 2012	614	3.42
Liz writes the script for the Avery TV-Movie and stirs up trouble for Jack and Diana Jessup (Mary Steenburgen).
118	15	"The Shower Principle"	Stephen Lee Davis	Tom Ceraulo	March 29, 2012	615	3.14
Jack must come up with an idea that will impress Hank Hooper and transform KableTown, while Liz tries her best to stick with a new hobby and prove she's a new woman. Jenna believes she's cursed and Hazel's obsession with Liz continues. Tracy signs on to do a new movie in order to pay his unexpectedly high taxes.
119	16	"Nothing Left to Lose"	John Riggi	Lauren Gurganous & Nina Pedrad	April 5, 2012	616	2.79
Jack tries to transform the slumping Pete into a respectable man of ambition. Meanwhile, Tracy recovers his lost sense of smell and is drawn to Liz's scent, and Jenna battles the writers in a prank war.
120	17	"Meet the Woggels!"	Linda Mendoza	Ron Weiner	April 12, 2012	617	2.98
Jenna has a relationship with someone in the music industry. Jack's mother horns in on a ribbon-cutting ceremony. Tracy's son is ready for college.
121	18	"Murphy Brown Lied to Us"	John Riggi	Robert Carlock & Vali Chandrasekaran	April 19, 2012	618	3.06
Jenna fakes a breakdown to try and win back Paul. Jack sets Liz up on a blind date. Criss and Liz try to figure out if they are ready to be parents.
122	19	"Live from Studio 6H"	Beth McCarthy Miller	Jack Burditt & Tina Fey	April 26, 2012	619	3.47
Kabletown chooses to stop funding live shows for TGS. While Liz and Jack embrace the change, Kenneth argues that live format should be kept intact. This is the show's second live episode, in which an East Coast and West Coast version were broadcast with slight adjustments such as guest appearances; Kim Kardashian in the West Coast version and Paul McCartney in the East.
123	20	"Queen of Jordan 2: Mystery of the Phantom Pooper"	Ken Whittingham	Luke Del Tredici & Tracey Wigfield	May 3, 2012	620	3.04
Angie's reality show once again films at TGS.
124	21	"The Return of Avery Jessup"	John Riggi	Dylan Morgan & Josh Siegal	May 10, 2012	621	2.92
Avery returns home.
125	22	"What Will Happen to the Gang Next Year?"	Michael Engler	Matt Hubbard	May 17, 2012	622	2.84
Jack and Avery renew their wedding vows.

== Reception ==
=== Critical reception ===
On Rotten Tomatoes, the season has an approval rating of 75% with an average score of 7.7 out of 10 based on 16 reviews. The website's critical consensus reads, "30 Rock feels content to spin its zany wheels in a sixth season that is nevertheless punctuated with great gags and an infectious sense of fun." Alan Sepinwall, writing for HitFix, noted that "there's been a lot of discussion [...] about how much Liz has or hasn't grown since the series began, and also about whether 30 Rock is a show that needs character development — or if, in fact, that growth would be counter-productive on such a silly, cartoonish show." He opined that "if a comedy is as funny as 30 Rock is capable of being — and as it's been so frequently in this late-in-life season — I'm fine with the characters being virtually identical now to the way they were in the pilot." Indrapramit Das, writing for Slant Magazine, awarded the season three stars out of four and commented that "there's something to be said for 30 Rock's unrepentant adherence to formula. By now, the characters' repeated bumbling through the cyclical purgatory at 30 Rockefeller Plaza has attained a certain rhythm, a comforting familiarity akin to long-running sitcoms like Friends." He concluded that "the cast's unfailing enthusiasm points to an ensemble that's only strengthening with age", but commented that the talents of guest star Kristen Schaal had been "wasted".

Dan Forcella, reviewing for TV Fanatic, opined that "television shows, especially sitcoms, normally lose some of their luster as time goes on. Whether it be that the series actually gets worse, or simply our perception of it does because the novelty has worn off, more often than not, things are not going to be the same by season six. Because of that fact, 30 Rock should be commended for how good its sixth season has been. There have been misses [...] and big hits [...] but all in all, this spring has been a solid run for the veteran sitcom." Writing for Splitsider, Jesse David Fox called the series "the best comedy of the 2011–2012 season" and went on to remark "next season is the show's last but it's not because of an overstayed welcome. The show is as sharp as ever, as gutsy as ever, as strange as ever, as funny as ever. Guys, it's the best."

=== Ratings ===
The sixth-season premiere, "Dance Like Nobody's Watching", attracted an audience of 4.5 million viewers. This demonstrated an increase from the fifth-season finale, "Respawn", which had drawn an audience of 4.2 million, but a significant decrease from the fifth-season premiere, "The Fabian Strategy", which had drawn 5.9 million. Four episodes of the sixth season demonstrated new series lows: "Idiots Are People Three!" (3.8 million), "Today You Are a Man" (3.2 million), "The Shower Principle" (3.1 million) and "Nothing Left to Lose" (2.8 million). The nineteenth episode of the season, "Live from Studio 6H", was broadcast live and demonstrated a six-week high in the ratings, with an audience of 3.5 million. However, the first live show, broadcast during the previous season, had attracted an audience of 6.7 million. Overall, with the inclusion of DVR viewership, the season averaged 4.6 million viewers, ranking one hundred and thirtieth for the year, according to Nielsen Media Research.

=== Awards and nominations ===
The sixth season received 13 Emmy Award nominations. The series obtained its sixth consecutive nomination for Outstanding Comedy Series. Alec Baldwin was nominated for Outstanding Lead Actor in a Comedy Series and Tina Fey for Outstanding Lead Actress in a Comedy Series. Will Arnett was nominated for Guest Actor in a Comedy Series for his role as Devon Banks in "Idiots Are People Three!" and Jon Hamm was also nominated for his roles as Abner and David Brinkley in "Live from Studio 6H". Elizabeth Banks was nominated for Guest Actress in a Comedy Series for her role as Avery Jessup and Margaret Cho was nominated for her role as Kim Jong-il, both for "The Return of Avery Jessup". The season received seven other Emmy nominations.
