= Grandmentor =

- 30 Rock episode
- Episode no.: Season 6 Episode 13
- Directed by: Beth McCarthy-Miller
- Written by: Sam Means
- Production code: 613
- Original air date: March 22, 2012

Guest appearances
- Kristen Schaal as Hazel Wassername; Matt Lauer as himself

Episode chronology
← Previous "St. Patrick's Day"	Next → "Kidnapped by Danger"
- 30 Rock season 6

"Grandmentor" is the thirteenth episode of the sixth season of the American television comedy series 30 Rock, and the 116th overall episode of the series. It was directed by Beth McCarthy-Miller, and written by Sam Means. The episode originally aired on NBC in the United States on March 22, 2012.

In the episode, Jack (Alec Baldwin) decides to create a TV-movie about Avery to keep her in the media spotlight. Liz (Tina Fey) agrees to write the script and Jenna (Jane Krakowski) campaigns to star in it. Meanwhile, Kenneth (Jack McBrayer) objects to new page Hazel's (Kristen Schaal) permissiveness with Tracy (Tracy Morgan), which prompts Hazel to choose Liz as a mentor.

== Plot ==
Jack (Alec Baldwin) goes on The Today Show to keep his wife's plight in the public eye. When his appearance is bumped for breaking news, Jenna (Jane Krakowski) suggests filming a TV movie about the kidnapping to gain more attention for Avery's predicament. Jack agrees and begins to cast it, angering Jenna. He recruits Liz (Tina Fey) to write the script. Jack finally agrees that Jenna captures Avery's "essence" when she ruthlessly pursues the role with no regard for Jack's feelings.

Meanwhile, Kenneth (Jack McBrayer) is appalled that new page Hazel (Kristen Schaal) allows Tracy to do many things that damage his health and behavior, but Hazel refuses him access to the actor. Hazel seeks out Liz's advice and asks to be her mentee. Liz sees the problem through a feminist lens and tells Hazel to stand up to Kenneth. She also tells Hazel to dump her boyfriend, advice that Hazel ignores. Jack coaches Liz on mentoring, telling her that one has to let the mentee fail occasionally. Kenneth quits his job so that he can win the contest for a non-speaking role on TGS, a contest for which Liz had procrastinated over picking a winner. Liz selects Kenneth as a safe pick, but he uses the opportunity to confess his devotion to Tracy and gives him the medicine he needs. The show is ruined, but Hazel shows up to admit that Liz's advice was right. Thereafter, she, Liz, and Jack (as the "Grandmentor") share a group hug.

== Reception ==
This episode attracted 3.31 million viewers.

Andy Greenwald of Grantland thought the episode was "a riotous Roman orgy of hilarity" that eventually became exhausting: "A nonstop barrage of jokes, even amazing jokes, can eventually feel like being sat on by Hazel two years ago."

David Sims of The Onion A.V. Club grew weary of the Hazel storyline, thinking that she might have made the show more relatable, but has become as insane as all the other characters. He speculated that Kenneth would eventually end up as a page again. "I’d be more disappointed if the show had been doing good work with Kenneth as a junior executive, but really, the excuses to shoehorn him into plots were getting more and more tiresome, so it’s probably best to just have him back as a page." He gave this episode and "Kidnapped by Danger" a combined grade of B−.
