= Idiots Are People Three! =

- 30 Rock episode
- Episode no.: Season 6 Episode 3
- Directed by: Beth McCarthy-Miller
- Written by: Robert Carlock
- Production code: 603
- Original air date: January 26, 2012

Guest appearances
- Will Arnett as Devon Banks; James Marsden as Criss; Marceline Hugot as Kathy Geiss; Kelsey Grammer as himself; Denise Richards as herself

Episode chronology
← Previous "Idiots Are People Two!"	Next → "The Ballad of Kenneth Parcell"
- 30 Rock season 6

"Idiots Are People Three!" is the third episode of the sixth season of the American television comedy series 30 Rock, and the 106th overall episode of the series. It was directed by Beth McCarthy-Miller, and written by co-show runner and executive producer Robert Carlock. The episode originally aired on NBC in the United States on January 26, 2012. Guest stars in this episode include Will Arnett, James Marsden, Kelsey Grammer, and Denise Richards.

In the episode, Jack Donaghy (Alec Baldwin) deals with the return of Devon Banks (Will Arnett) and Liz Lemon's (Tina Fey) relationship with Criss (James Marsden); Liz deals with Tracy Jordan (Tracy Morgan) and his protest for idiots; and Kenneth Parcell (Jack McBrayer), Jenna Maroney (Jane Krakowski), and Kelsey Grammer attempt to clean up after Kenneth and Jenna accidentally poison and knock out Pete Hornberger (Scott Adsit).

== Plot ==
Criss (James Marsden) learns that Jack Donaghy (Alec Baldwin) is the boss of Liz Lemon (Tina Fey). He then gives Liz an ultimatum: Jack or him. Liz chooses Criss. She had been doubting Criss lately due to Jack being in her head and says that maybe he could work on some things, which angers him. Jack then deals with Devon Banks (Will Arnett), who tells him that in return for Jack getting his triplets into a prestigious school, he will stop attacking NBC for Tracy's homophobic comments. Devon also possesses additional footage of Tracy making offensive statements, which he promises will be withheld if Jack follows through on their deal. Jack pulls some favors and comes through on the deal, only for Devon to point out that Jack's daughter Liddy will now not get into the school, as Jack has exhausted his favors. Jack is upset at first, until he realizes, with the help of Tracy, that he had humble beginnings and became powerful. He knows that Liddy will do just fine.

Liz tries to come to a conclusion about Criss, but also has to deal with Tracy's continuing "idiot protest." She eventually creates a compromise with Tracy, where she reads an apology that they wrote for her. While reading it, she realizes that she wants to be with Criss because he makes her happy. Jack sees this and approves of Criss for the time, giving him three months to prove himself.

Kenneth Parcell (Jack McBrayer) and Jenna Maroney (Jane Krakowski) work with Kelsey Grammer to move the unconscious Pete (Scott Adsit). A problem the group faces is that there are too many people backstage. To create a diversion, Kelsey improvises a one-man show about Abraham Lincoln. They are able to sneak Pete to his office and set it up to make it look like he was practicing auto-erotic asphyxiation. Kelsey shows Liz, who is disgusted. The "Best Friends Gang" share champagne to celebrate the successful completion of their plan. Jenna then realizes the lights in her dressing room just needed to be turned on with two light switches, therefore, none of the events from their adventure actually had to occur.

== Reception ==
According to the Nielsen Media Research, this episode of 30 Rock was watched by 3.82 million households in its original American broadcast. It earned a 1.6 rating/5 share in the 18–49 demographic. This means that it was seen by 1.6 percent of all 18- to 49-year-olds, and 5 percent of all 18- to 49-year-olds watching television at the time of the broadcast.

The episode received generally positive reviews from critics. Alan Sepinwall, writing for HitFix, issued high praise for this episode and "The Ballad of Kenneth Parcell", which had aired on the same evening. He commented that "the jokes not only kept coming, but kept hitting, almost every time". Dan Forcella of TV Fanatic particularly praised Grammer's performance, calling him "absolutely hilarious" and adding "I'm not sure which was better, Kelsey deciding to make up a one man play about Abraham Lincoln in order to distract the people of 30 Rock, or the fact that he pulled it off and everyone in the crowd loved his performance. Either way, the "Best Friends Gang" needs to stay together forever." He gave the episode 4 out of 5 stars.

Kevin Fitzpatrick of TV Over Mind gave a mixed review, calling it unnecessary that there was a separation between the two parts of "Idiots Are People" and accusing the Kelsey Grammer plot line of being insignificant.
