= Murphy Brown Lied to Us =

- 30 Rock episode
- Episode no.: Season 6 Episode 18
- Directed by: John Riggi
- Written by: Robert Carlock; Vali Chandrasekaran
- Production code: 618
- Original air date: April 19, 2012

Guest appearances
- James Marsden as Criss Chros; Will Forte as Paul L'astname; Bobby Moynihan as Stewart; Matt Lauer as himself; Stacy Keach as himself

Episode chronology
← Previous "Meet the Woggels!"	Next → "Live from Studio 6H"
- 30 Rock season 6

"Murphy Brown Lied to Us" is the eighteenth episode of the sixth season of the American television comedy series 30 Rock, and the 121st overall episode of the series. It was directed by John Riggi, and written by Robert Carlock and Vali Chandrasekaran. The episode originally aired on NBC in the United States on April 19, 2012.

In the episode, Liz (Tina Fey) reconsiders her decision to not have a child; Jenna (Jane Krakowski) stages a celebrity breakdown to bring Paul back to her; and Jack (Alec Baldwin) runs into production problems at his new couch factory.

== Plot ==
While cleaning her apartment, Liz (Tina Fey) and boyfriend Criss stumble upon some of her old adoption materials. Liz dismisses the idea of having a child, but Criss seems cautiously open to it. Jack (Alec Baldwin) sets her up on a blind date with his associate Kevin, which she accepts under protest. An encounter with Kevin's exceptional daughter re-inspires her to have children, which is revealed to be Jack's plan all along. Jack encourages Liz to procreate and Criss and Liz decide to try.

Jack's new couch design is revealed to be extremely uncomfortable due to his insistence on inferior American engineering. After an unsuccessful attempt to market uncomfortable couches, Jack sells them to the CIA for use as interrogation devices. One of the couches is used to interrogate a man who is a North Korean spy. He reveals a way to recover Jack's wife, Avery Jessup.

Jenna (Jane Krakowski) schemes to win boyfriend Paul back by staging a celebrity breakdown, which involves erratic behavior on television. When running through a window lands her in the hospital, Jenna expresses her feelings for Paul to Tracy. Unbeknownst to Jenna, Paul is listening in while disguised as a nurse. They passionately kiss and reunite.

Included in this episode are three KouchTown commercials featuring Stacy Keach. He parodies Chrysler's Halftime in America Super Bowl 2012 advertisements (which featured Clint Eastwood).

== Reception ==
The episode was very well received by critics. Andy Greenwald of Grantland was impressed with the show, saying it "saved the evening in an utterly unexpected way. It wasn’t only the funniest half-hour of the night by a considerable margin. It was also the sweetest." He called it "one of the best episodes 30 Rock’s ever produced."

Alan Sepinwall of Hitfix.com called it "the funniest episode in ages... Not only is it the most I've laughed at an episode in a long time, it featured a fantastic Jack/Liz moment in the climax." He thought this fit in with a "terrific late-career renaissance" in the show's sixth season.

Meredith Blake of the Onion A.V. Club gave the episode a B+: "It’s an episode that, while not quite as laugh-heavy as the very best of 30 Rock, deserves an above-average grade because it represents a fairly monumental moment in the history of the show: It’s the one where Liz finally decides to have a baby. It's a development that, frankly, fills me with joy. To quote L.L. herself, 'Life is happening!'"

== See also ==
- Murphy Brown, the TV series (or its titular character) referenced in the title of this episode
