= Kidnapped by Danger =

- 30 Rock episode
- Episode no.: Season 6 Episode 14
- Directed by: Claire Cowperthwaite
- Written by: Tina Fey
- Production code: 614
- Original air date: March 22, 2012

Guest appearances
- Mary Steenburgen as Diana Jessup; Cynthia Nixon as herself; Jimmy Fallon as himself; "Weird Al" Yankovic as himself; William Baldwin as Lance Drake Mandrell; Seth Kirschner as Shawn Connelly; Chiquinquirá Delgado as herself

Episode chronology
| ← Previous "Grandmentor" | Next → "The Shower Principle" |
- 30 Rock season 6

"Kidnapped by Danger" is the fourteenth episode of the sixth season of the American television comedy series 30 Rock, and the 116th overall episode of the series. It was directed by Claire Cowperthwaite, and written by series creator and star Tina Fey. The episode originally aired on NBC in the United States on March 22, 2012, immediately after the previous episode, "Grandmentor".

In the episode, Jack (Alec Baldwin) and writer Liz (Tina Fey) have creative differences over the Avery Jessup TV movie project; Avery's mother (Mary Steenburgen) returns to oversee production, rekindling her chemistry with Jack; Kenneth (Jack McBrayer) copes with his new job as an NBC janitor; and Jenna (Jane Krakowski) reacts poorly to a "Weird Al" Yankovic parody of her new single.

Jenna (Jane Krakowski) claims to have turned down having sex on three occasions (out of 5) with Harvey Weinstein in this episode.

== Plot ==
Avery's mother Diana (Mary Steenburgen) arrives to make sure that the TV movie about her daughter portrays her in a good light. Liz (Tina Fey) promises to help Jack (Alec Baldwin) overcome his chemistry with Diana and keep him out of an inappropriate relationship. Liz eventually fixes Diana up with the actor playing Jack (William Baldwin, Alec Baldwin's real life brother) to keep her away from Jack. At the table reading of Liz's script, Jack is appalled that Liz has included some seedy details about Jack and Avery's courtship. He fires Liz from the project and rewrites the script himself. Jack eventually realizes that Liz is right that he had been idealizing his relationship with Avery. Liz consoles him and helps him rewrite the script to be a total fabrication.

Kenneth, having quit the job he had in "Standards and Practices", tries to find a new job at NBC. He eventually finds a position as a janitor, which in many ways is lower than where he started as a page. He admits to Jack that he makes it through each day by lying to himself.

Jenna's new single to promote the movie is immediately parodied by "Weird Al" Yankovic. Furious, she and Tracy try to write a new song that cannot be parodied. They eventually come up with a song as silly as a typical Weird Al offering and she debuts it on Late Night with Jimmy Fallon. Weird Al counters by creating an entirely serious song set to the same tune.

== Reception ==
The show attracted 3.42 million viewers in its time slot.

Andy Greenwald of Grantland thought the episode was "no-less brilliant" than the episode that preceded it, but that it "suffered slightly" for being "richness on top of richness." He says "it’s only in retrospect, looking over my notes, that I realize the material in the second half-hour might have actually been stronger.".

David Sims of The A.V. Club liked that "the successful-joke-per-minute ratio of 30 Rock is still pretty high, and I got quite a few laughs out of a lot of the random gags," but feels that the series suffers from "struggling to make the onscreen insanity at all relatable." He gave this episode and the one before it a combined grade of B−.
