= The Shower Principle =

- 30 Rock episode
- Episode no.: Season 6 Episode 15
- Directed by: Stephen Lee Davis
- Written by: Tom Ceraulo
- Production code: 615
- Original air date: March 29, 2012

Guest appearances
- Kristen Schaal as Hazel; Thomas Roberts as himself; Ken Howard as Hank Hooper; Peter Jessop as Mayor MacCheese (voice)

Episode chronology
| ← Previous "Kidnapped by Danger" | Next → "Nothing Left to Lose" |
- 30 Rock season 6

"The Shower Principle" is the fifteenth episode of the sixth season of the American television comedy series 30 Rock, and the 117th overall episode of the series. It was directed by Stephen Lee Davis, and written by Tom Ceraulo. The episode originally aired on NBC in the United States on March 29, 2012.

In the episode, Liz (Tina Fey) realizes that every year in her life is exactly like the last and uses this knowledge to her advantage; Jack (Alec Baldwin) searches for a business pitch that will transform Kabletown; Jenna (Jane Krakowski) deals with a theatrical curse; and Tracy (Tracy Morgan) has trouble with the IRS.

== Plot ==
In a meeting with her accountant about her taxes, Liz realizes that every year is exactly like the last. By consulting her journal entries from last year, she is able to anticipate and solve several workplace problems. After her new hobby of meditation fails to bring her peace, she realizes that her coworkers are what has left her in a rut.

Jack, appalled that boss Hank Hooper is planning to use profits to pay a dividend, seeks the business pitch that will convince Hank to invest the money in the company instead. He tries to distract himself with showers and golf, operating under the theory that putting his mind elsewhere will bring inspiration. He realizes that Liz is the only distraction that allows him to function, and in desperation turns to her suggestion of meditation. He immediately comes up with a plan to manufacture couches and control the entire TV viewing experience, a plan that Hank loves.

Jenna refuses to perform in a sketch based on Macbeth due to her belief in The Scottish Play curse. Liz casts Cerie to make Jenna jealous, which is met with immediate success. Jenna then suffers multiple serious accidents. New page Hazel admits these were her attempts to scare away Jenna so that Hazel can be Liz's best friend.

Tracy, realizing that it is almost tax day, starts to remember multiple income sources and needs to generate some cash by starring in a movie. This storyline is not resolved in the episode.

== Reception ==
The episode's first showing attracted 3.14 million viewers. The A.V. Club gave the episode a C+.
