= Meet the Woggels! =

- 30 Rock episode
- Episode no.: Season 6 Episode 17
- Directed by: Linda Mendoza
- Written by: Ron Weiner
- Production code: 617
- Original air date: April 12, 2012

Guest appearances
- Elaine Stritch as Colleen Donaghy; Will Forte as Paul L'astname; Rachel Maddow as herself; Clarke Thorell as Russ; Mark Douglas as Ian

Episode chronology
← Previous "Nothing Left to Lose"	Next → "Murphy Brown Lied To Us"
- 30 Rock season 6

"Meet the Woggels!" is the seventeenth episode of the sixth season of the American television comedy series 30 Rock, and the 120th overall episode of the series. It was directed by Linda Mendoza, and written by Ron Weiner. The episode originally aired on NBC in the United States on April 12, 2012.

In the episode, Jack's mother becomes seriously ill, forcing him to confront his feelings for her; Jenna (Jane Krakowski) dates a member of a children's musical group; and Tracy (Tracy Morgan) laments that his son is going to attend college.

== Plot ==
During the opening of his couch factory, Jack (Alec Baldwin) discovers that his mother Colleen (Elaine Stritch) has been hospitalized in New York for a heart ailment. Liz (Tina Fey) believes that the emotionally distant Colleen may be seriously ill and is trying to repair her relationship with Jack before it is too late. After much prodding from Liz, they eventually have a heartfelt conversation.

Jenna (Jane Krakowski) is attempting to do everything on her "sexual walkabout" checklist. She fulfills several items by dating a popular children's entertainer (Clarke Thorell) and "Yoko"-ing his band. She realizes that the whole enterprise is a poor substitute for her boyfriend Paul, but is crushed to learn that Paul is intimately involved with another woman and an anthropomorphic couch. She leaves heartbroken.

Tracy (Tracy Morgan) is mortified to learn that his oldest son, George Foreman, is planning to attend Stanford University. Fearful that his son has been "coddled" into becoming a nerd, he takes him around for the day to show him how Jordan men behave and induct him into his entourage. George is tempted to stay and further reconnect with Tracy, but Tracy eventually hints that he should go to college after all.

== Cultural references ==
The children's band featured in the episode are called The Woggels, a reference to real-life Australian children's band The Wiggles.

== Reception ==
This episode's premiere was viewed by 3.09 million people. The A.V. Club gave the episode a B+.
