= Queen of Jordan 2: Mystery of the Phantom Pooper =

- 30 Rock episode
- Episode no.: Season 6 Episode 20
- Directed by: Ken Whittingham
- Written by: Luke Del Tredici; Tracey Wigfield
- Production code: 620
- Original air date: May 3, 2012

Guest appearances
- Mary Steenburgen as Diana Jessup; Tituss Burgess as D'Fwan; Sherri Shepherd as Angie Jordan; Paula Leggett Chase as Randi

Episode chronology
← Previous "Live from Studio 6H"	Next → "The Return of Avery Jessup"
- 30 Rock season 6

"Queen of Jordan 2: Mystery of the Phantom Pooper" is the twentieth episode of the sixth season of the American television comedy series 30 Rock, and the 123rd overall episode of the series. It was directed by Ken Whittingham, and written by Luke Del Tredici and Tracey Wigfield. The episode originally aired on NBC in the United States on May 3, 2012.

The episode uses the format of a mock reality show centered on Tracy's wife, Angie Jordan (Sherri Shepherd), similar to the Season 5 episode "Queen of Jordan". In the episode, Jack (Alec Baldwin) attempts to cover up his mutual attraction with his mother-in-law (Mary Steenburgen); Liz (Tina Fey) feuds with Tracy's two-year-old daughter; and Angie expects a romantic surprise from Tracy at the end of her fashion show.

== Plot ==
Jack (Alec Baldwin) receives a call from the U.S. State Department saying that they have recovered his kidnapped wife Avery through a prisoner exchange with North Korea. When Avery's mother Diana (Mary Steenburgen) comes by to help with the reunion, she says on camera that they shouldn't tell Avery about "us." Jack and Diana both make up excuses about what she meant, which are combined into the lie that they are opening a Russian restaurant together that night. Having completed the ruse, they congratulate each other at the opening party, but then succumb to their impulses and kiss. Liz (Tina Fey) covers for them by saying that Jack kisses everyone European-style. Afterwards, Jack and Liz reluctantly kiss to illustrate the point.

Liz hopes to spend time with Tracy's two-year-old daughter, Virginia, to gain experience for her possible motherhood. She accidentally insults Virginia's thighs, which results in a trumped-up reality show "feud" between them. Liz begins to have doubts about her suitability as a mother. When Virginia sees Liz cover for Jack, she is impressed by her sacrifice and ends the feud. The network sends them on a televised vacation together to Somalia.

Tracy's wife Angie is focused on the launch of her new clothing line, including an on-air fashion show. She hints to Tracy that she expects a romantic gesture at the show, but Tracy prefers to play video games. When Angie storms into his dressing room to yell at him, Tracy becomes angry. He then stirs up a (false) fight to boost the ratings of the show. Angie picks up the cue and the two agree to have a drawn-out divorce in a staged argument.

== Reception ==
Meredith Blake of The A.V. Club gave the episode a B+.
