= Nothing Left to Lose (30 Rock) =

- 30 Rock episode
- Episode no.: Season 6 Episode 16
- Directed by: John Riggi
- Written by: Lauren Gurganous; Nina Pedrad
- Production code: 616
- Original air date: April 5, 2012

Guest appearance
- Chris Parnell as Dr. Spaceman

Episode chronology
← Previous "The Shower Principle"	Next → "Meet the Woggels!"
- 30 Rock season 6

"Nothing Left to Lose" is the sixteenth episode of the sixth season of the American television comedy series 30 Rock, and the 118th overall episode of the series. It was directed by John Riggi, and written by Lauren Gurganous and Nina Pedrad. The episode originally aired on NBC in the United States on April 5, 2012.

In the episode, Jack (Alec Baldwin) encourages defeated employee Pete (Scott Adsit) to be more ambitious in life; Tracy's restored sense of smell causes him to treat Liz (Tina Fey) as a father figure; and Jenna (Jane Krakowski) has another prank war with the writers.

== Plot ==
Kabletown's employee self-evaluations reveal that in five years, Pete (Scott Adsit) only hopes to maintain his current position. Jack (Alec Baldwin) considers his lack of ambition a personal failure and tries to boost his confidence. After a series of pathetic failures, Jack admits he is only stalling to avoid filling out his own self-evaluation. Pete then throws Jack out of his office for making his life even worse (and making him completely shave off his hair, revealing an obscene birthmark).

When releasing his new fragrance, Tracy (Tracy Morgan) reveals he has had no sense of smell since childhood. Dr. Spaceman (Chris Parnell) removes a Buck Rodgers decoder ring stuck up his nose. Tracy's new sense of smell associates the pomade of Liz (Tina Fey) with the father that abandoned him and he begins behaving like a model employee to impress her. Although Liz is thrilled with Tracy's behavior, she finds out he has abandoned his family in the process. She asks Dr. Spaceman to reverse the operation for Tracy's own good.

After the writers pull yet another prank on her, Jenna (Jane Krakowski) gets revenge by finding embarrassing details in their trash. The writers get back at her by making her feel sorry for Lutz (John Lutz), whom she'd left out of her revenge. This also turns out to be a prank and the writers submit video footage of her digging through a dumpster to a fetish website. When Jenna finds out about this, she recognizes that she has done a nice thing for Lutz by digging through his trash all night. Jenna then realizes that she is not the worst person she has ever known, but rather the fourth worst since the three writers took advantage of her kindness.

== Cultural references ==
When Jack laments that NBC's writers are all "so white", Liz exclaims that "Popo popped Dukie down by the vacants", a reference to HBO's The Wire, which is notable among shows with predominantly African American casts for gaining significant traction among white Americans. Later on in the episode, Tracy also references "popping Dukie down by the vacants".

== Reception ==
The premiere of this episode attracted 2.79 million viewers, a new low for the series. The A.V. Club gave the episode a C−.
