= What Will Happen to the Gang Next Year? =

- 30 Rock episode
- Episode no.: Season 6 Episode 22
- Directed by: Michael Engler
- Written by: Matt Hubbard
- Production code: 622
- Original air date: May 17, 2012

Guest appearances
- James Marsden as Criss Chros; Mary Steenburgen as Diana Jessup; Margaret Cho as Kim Jong Il; Kristen Schaal as Hazel Wassername; Michael Mosley as Scott Scottsman; Thomas Roberts as himself; Cornel West as himself; Pat Kiernan as himself; Elizabeth Banks as Avery Jessup

Episode chronology
← Previous "The Return of Avery Jessup"	Next → "The Beginning of the End"
- 30 Rock season 6

"What Will Happen to the Gang Next Year?" is the twenty-second and final episode of the sixth season of the American television comedy series 30 Rock, and the 125th overall episode of the series. It was directed by Michael Engler, and written by Matt Hubbard. The episode originally aired on NBC in the United States on May 17, 2012.

In the episode, Jack (Alec Baldwin) and Avery (Elizabeth Banks) seek to renew their vows; Criss (James Marsden) sets out to show Liz (Tina Fey) he can pay for their nursery renovation; Kenneth (Jack McBrayer) gives new page Hazel (Kristen Schaal) a place to stay; and Tracy (Tracy Morgan) tries to be less of an embarrassment to African Americans.

== Plot ==
While watching an interview with Avery and fellow captive Scott Scotsman (Michael Mosley), Jack realizes they communicate with each other using a code of finger taps. He begins to believe that during their captivity, they must have been conducting an affair through coded taps. When confronted, Avery admits to her feelings for Scott. Both insist on moving forward with renewing their vows in spite of both this revelation and the tension surrounding Jack kissing Avery's mother. Liz officiates at the ceremony, which proceeds smoothly despite the presence of several aggrieved attendees. When no one speaks out against the marriage, Jack and Avery simultaneously question the crowd, admitting that they only got married because of their baby. They agree to divorce on the spot. Jack finishes the episode admitting to Liz that his love life is a mess.

Criss takes out his hot dog truck to raise the money needed to renovate the nursery, as he believes Liz will bail on him if he can't provide for them. It doesn't go well, but Liz sees his van on the news as the getaway vehicle for a bank robbery. Liz assumes he is guilty and offers to go to jail for him. Finding out that he sold the van that morning to raise the money, they recommit to have a child together.

Hazel needs a place to stay for financial reasons. Kenneth ends up giving her a place to stay, but then Jenna tells him that Hazel sabotaged his re-application to the page program. When he confronts Hazel, she says she has developed feelings for him and they kiss.

Tracy discovers that he is viewed as an embarrassment to African Americans and a comfort to racists because of his general buffoonery. Grizz and Dotcom set up a meeting with Dr. Cornel West to inspire him to do better. Later on, Tracy visits a civil rights museum. While there, he is inspired to emulate Tyler Perry by creating his own studio and solely employing African Americans in creative positions.

== Reception ==
"What Will Happen to the Gang Next Year?" was watched by 2.84 million viewers and earned a 1.4 rating/4 share in the 18–49 demographic. This means that it was seen by 1.4 percent of all 18- to 49-year-olds, and 4 percent of all 18- to 49-year-olds watching television at the time of the broadcast. This made it the lowest-rated episode in 30 Rock's history. and a decrease from the previous episode "The Return of Avery Jessup" (2.92 million)
