= The Ballad of Kenneth Parcell =

- 30 Rock episode
- Episode no.: Season 6 Episode 4
- Directed by: Jeff Richmond
- Written by: Matt Hubbard
- Production code: 604
- Original air date: January 26, 2012

Guest appearances
- Ken Howard as Hank Hooper; Nick Cannon as himself; Andy Samberg as himself; Emma Stone as herself; Mick Foley as Mankind; Julie Dretzin as Amy; Steve Earle as himself; Phillie Phanatic as himself; Rachel Dratch as Not Kenneth

Episode chronology
← Previous "Idiots Are People Three!"	Next → "Today You Are a Man"
- 30 Rock season 6

"The Ballad of Kenneth Parcell" is the fourth episode of the sixth season of the American television comedy series 30 Rock, and the 107th overall episode of the series. It was directed by Jeff Richmond, and written by co-executive producer Matt Hubbard. The episode originally aired on NBC in the United States on January 26, 2012. Guest stars in this episode include Emma Stone, Ken Howard, Mick Foley, Andy Samberg, and the Philadelphia Phillies mascot the Phillie Phanatic. Steve Earle sings a ballad about Kenneth Parcell in the closing credits.

In the episode, Liz Lemon (Tina Fey) and Jenna Maroney (Jane Krakowski) fall out as a result of Jenna's selfish behavior since her role on America's Kidz Got Singing, Jack Donaghy (Alec Baldwin) eliminates the page program to impress Hank Hooper (Ken Howard), but comes to suffer the consequences, and Tracy Jordan (Tracy Morgan) contemplates his own mortality after a misunderstanding results in him receiving no birthday presents.

== Plot ==
As a result of her role on America's Kidz Got Singing, Jenna Maroney (Jane Krakowski) has become a more widely known celebrity and is starring in the new holiday movie Martin Luther King Day. Soon, she begins to let the fame go to her head. Jenna even uses her best friend Liz Lemon (Tina Fey) as a decoy when leaving a restaurant, tricking her into having paint thrown over her by PETA protestors on her behalf. This leads the pair to fall out and go in search of new best friends. Jenna starts hanging out with D-list celebrities, such as Charlie from Charlie Bit My Finger, while Liz comes across her doppelgänger in a Barnes & Noble bathroom.

Jack Donaghy (Alec Baldwin) eliminates the page program to impress Hank Hooper (Ken Howard), since all the jobs that the pages do can be done electronically to save money. Kenneth Parcell (Jack McBrayer) argues against this, but Jack still goes through with his plan, even naming the new computer "NotKenneth." However, Jack's plan backfires when a one-year "businessversery" present to Hank is sent to TGS by accident, as Jack accidentally instructed the computer to deliver it to the "6th floor" instead of the "60th floor". Finally, Tracy Jordan (Tracy Morgan) discovers that he won't be receiving any birthday presents due to a misunderstanding. When Grizz (Grizz Chapman) and Dot Com (Kevin Brown) inform him that he already has most things anyway, he starts to contemplate his own mortality.

Ultimately, Liz comes to realize that she needs Jenna because she is too self-absorbed to complain when she talks about her problems, while Jenna notices that all of her D-list friends are too self-absorbed to pay her any attention. Jack acknowledges then he needs Kenneth and the other pages because he is able to blame all of his mistakes on them, while Tracy discovers that he was simply annoyed with Grizz and Dot Com for not buying him any presents. During the closing credits, folk singer Steve Earle sings a ballad about the rise of Kenneth from farm boy to page.

== Reception ==
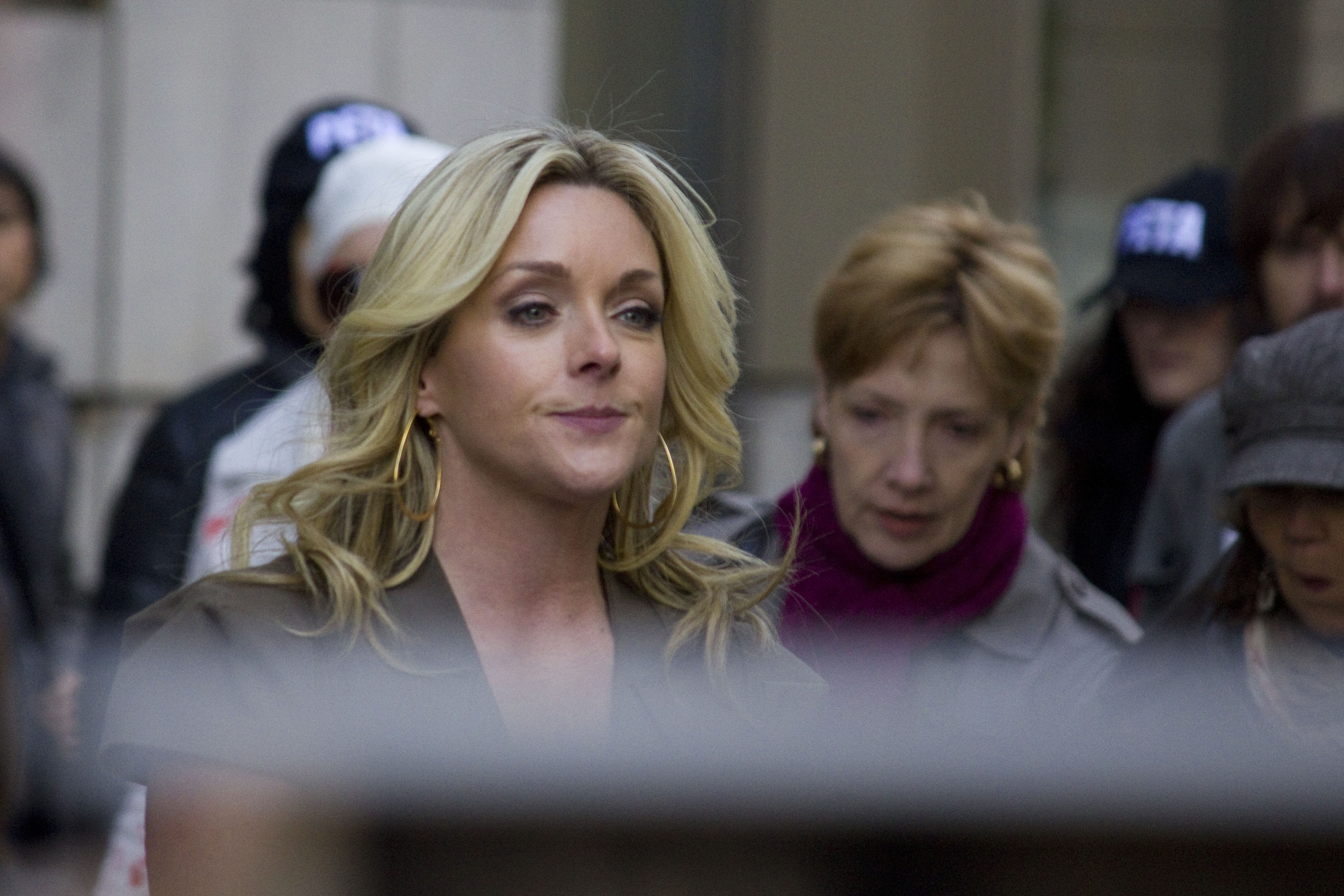
Jane Krakowski filming the episode in New York City on October 28, 2011

According to the Nielsen Media Research, this episode of 30 Rock was watched by 3.98 million households in its original American broadcast. It earned a 1.9 rating/5 share in the 18–49 demographic. This means that it was seen by 1.9 percent of all 18- to 49-year-olds, and 5 percent of all 18- to 49-year-olds watching television at the time of the broadcast.

The episode received positive reviews from critics. Emily Cheever of Ology praised the episode as a big improvement over the previous celebrity-filled, "gimmicky" episodes of the series, opining that the show was best when it was utilizing its main cast. She gave the episode an 8 out of 10. Alan Sepinwall, writing for HitFix, praised this and previous episode "Idiots Are People Three!", calling them both "terrific episodes where the jokes not only kept coming, but kept hitting, almost every time".
