= St. Patrick's Day (30 Rock) =

- 30 Rock episode
- Episode no.: Season 6 Episode 12
- Directed by: John Riggi
- Written by: Colleen McGuinness
- Production code: 612
- Original air date: March 15, 2012

Guest appearances
- James Marsden as Criss Chros; Dean Winters as Dennis Duffy; Kristen Schaal as Hazel Wassername; Al Roker as himself; Ira Glass as himself; Bernie McInerney as Priest

Episode chronology
← Previous "Standards and Practices"	Next → "Grandmentor"
- 30 Rock season 6

"St. Patrick's Day" is the twelfth episode of the sixth season of the American television comedy series 30 Rock, and the 115th overall episode of the series. It was directed by John Riggi, and written by Colleen McGuinness. The episode originally aired on NBC in the United States on March 15, 2012.

In the episode, a visit from Dennis Duffy (Dean Winters) forces Liz (Tina Fey) to progress in her relationship with Criss (James Marsden); new page Hazel (Kristen Schaal) accidentally rekindles the rivalry between stars Tracy (Tracy Morgan) and Jenna (Jane Krakowski); and Jack (Alec Baldwin) finds a metaphor for his life in a fantasy boardgame played with the writing staff.

== Plot ==
Liz, expressing a general disdain for the Irish, plans to spend St. Patrick's Day in her apartment with boyfriend Criss ridiculing the revelers outside. Criss slips "I love you" into their conversation, but Liz changes the subject. Ex-boyfriend Dennis Duffy shows up injured at her door. Liz presumes this is a ploy to win her back. Criss is hospitable to Dennis, who claims to now be married. After Liz claims her love for Dennis in an effort to call his bluff, Criss storms out angry over her ease of saying "I love you" to Dennis. Liz finds out that Dennis's wife does in fact exist and Dennis points out that Liz has been mistreating Criss. She finds Criss on the street serving hot dog buns to customers and finally tells Criss that she loves him.

Jenna and Tracy once more are hosting coverage for the St. Patrick's Day parade. New page Hazel starts a fight between them by inadvertently giving a cue that Jenna is a bigger star, which also angers Pete. She tries to fix it by replacing their names in the script with "Host #1" and "Host #2", which causes both to read the lines for Host #1. Kenneth, at home on a Saturday thanks to his new job, resists the urge to intervene when he sees the disaster on television. Both stars are replaced by Al Roker mid-broadcast and leave the set. Outside, a car waiting for one of them is labeled "Host #2." They are confused about who should get in and recognize the underlying emotions that are driving the fight. They return to host the rest of the broadcast. Hazel discovers that Kenneth made the sign and drove the car to force this resolution.

Jack discovers that the writers are playing a fantasy boardgame in the office because their faces are too punchable on St. Patrick's Day. He gets wrapped up in the economic dynamics of the game, but ends up losing most of his assets and finds it to be metaphor for his stagnant career at Kabletown. After some soul searching at St. Patrick's Cathedral, he comes up with a tactic to win the game, which results in him receiving general adulation.

== Cultural references ==
- The board game the writers play has obvious similarities to The Settlers of Catan.
- The "lez movie" Dennis and Criss watch is implied to be The Kids Are All Right.
- When the Star Wars-obsessed Liz finally tells Criss, "I love you," he responds, "I know," thereby recreating the exchange between Princess Leia and Han Solo in The Empire Strikes Back. Liz gasps "You 'Solo-ed' me."
