= Live from Studio 6H =

- 30 Rock episode
- The cast of 30 Rock and their special guests bid goodnight to the live audience at the end of "Live from Studio 6H" in a tribute to Saturday Night Live
- Episode no.: Season 6 Episode 19
- Directed by: Beth McCarthy-Miller
- Written by: Jack Burditt; Tina Fey
- Production code: 619
- Original air date: April 26, 2012

Guest appearances
- Fred Armisen as Frank 2.0/Phone Lady; Jimmy Fallon as young Jack Donaghy; Will Forte as Paul L'Astname; Donald Glover as young Tracy Jordan; Jon Hamm as Abner and David Brinkley (latter in East Coast airing); Kim Kardashian as herself (West Coast airing); Paul McCartney as himself (East Coast airing); Chris Parnell as Leo Spaceman; Amy Poehler as young Liz Lemon; Kristen Schaal as Hazel Wassername; Brian Williams as David Brinkley (West Coast airing)

Episode chronology
← Previous "Murphy Brown Lied to Us"	Next → "Queen of Jordan 2: Mystery of the Phantom Pooper"
- 30 Rock season 6

"Live from Studio 6H" is the nineteenth episode of the sixth season of the American television comedy series 30 Rock, and the 122nd episode overall. It features a return to live broadcasting from the season five episode "Live Show", both of which were directed by Beth McCarthy-Miller, and co-written by series creator Tina Fey. The episode originally aired live on the NBC television network in the United States on April 26, 2012, with separate tapings for the East Coast and West Coast audiences. "Live from Studio 6H" featured guest appearances by comedian Amy Poehler, musician Paul McCartney, and several actors associated with 30 Rock and Saturday Night Live.

30 Rock follows the production of the fictional sketch comedy program The Girlie Show with Tracy Jordan (TGS). In this episode, producer Jack Donaghy and head writer Liz Lemon decide to cease live broadcasts of TGS to save money. In order to save the magic of live television, Kenneth Parcell gives an impassioned history of live broadcasting to his co-workers in order to maintain the tradition for the show.

The episode makes explicit references to classic television sitcoms and variety shows. It uses humor such as breaking the fourth wall and acknowledges that the actors are portraying fictional characters. It received generally positive reviews from critics.

On June 22, 2020, it was announced that both versions of this episode would be pulled from syndication due to the segment of Jon Hamm wearing blackface.

== Plot ==
Jack notifies Liz Lemon that the network is ceasing live broadcasts of TGS in order to save money. Kenneth Parcell is distressed by the decision and locks the show's staff in Tracy Jordan's dressing room to convince them of the magic provided by live television. Kenneth recounts memorable moments in NBC broadcast history to the TGS staff. Meanwhile, TGS co-star Jenna Maroney announces that she plans to upstage her fellow actors by announcing her engagement on air. Elsewhere, NBC page Hazel Wassername decides that she will run onstage to get her big break in entertainment by proposing to Maroney herself.

It turns out that the appearance of Tracy Jordan's dance troupe on a live television fundraiser in 1986 had significant impacts: Tracy tripped and fell, realizing that he could be comedic; Liz prank called the studio, igniting her love for fighting authority; and Jack answered Liz's phone call, his professionalism impressing executive Don Geiss into giving him a promotion. The cast agree that they want to continue making live television. In the middle of a skit, Jenna's boyfriend Paul L'astname proposes, but Jenna declines because she wants to marry for love rather than a ratings stunt. Hazel interrupts their moment by ripping apart a picture of Sinéad O'Connor.

The separate broadcasts have minor differences between them.

== Production ==
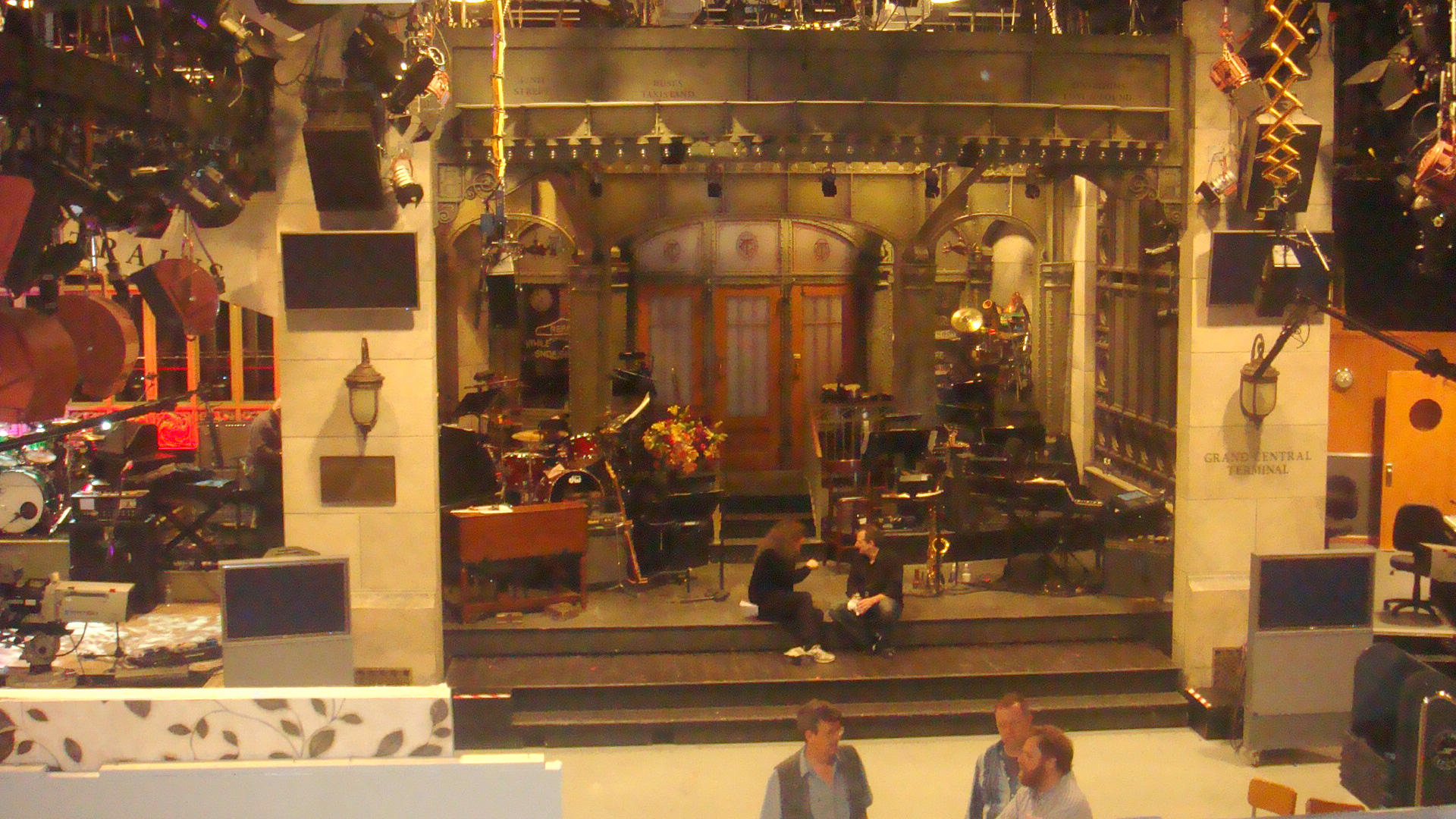
Studio 8H in the GE Building at 30 Rockefeller Plaza is where Saturday Night Live (SNL) is filmed and was used as the location for "Live from Studio 6H". 30 Rock is loosely based on creator Tina Fey's experience on that program and several SNL alumni participated in the filming of this episode.

NBC asked the cast and crew to create a second live episode and on March 21, 2012, co-star Baldwin announced in an interview with Extra that 30 Rock would air their second live episode after the critical and commercial success of "Live Show". The episode aired to capitalize on May sweeps. Fey, Morgan, Krakowski, and McBrayer had all expressed excitement about performing a second live show, but Baldwin was initially skeptical until he read the script and was convinced.

"Live from Studio 6H" was co-written by series creator, executive producer, and lead actress Fey and co-showrunner and screenwriter and producer Jack Burditt. It was directed by Beth McCarthy-Miller, who worked with Fey on the sketch comedy show Saturday Night Live and received a nomination for a Primetime Emmy Award for Outstanding Directing for a Comedy Series for directing "Live Show" in 2010. Like the previous episode, it was filmed in SNL home Studio 8H rather than 30 Rock’s usual Silvercup Studios as the latter is configured for single-camera filming and an absence of a live audience.

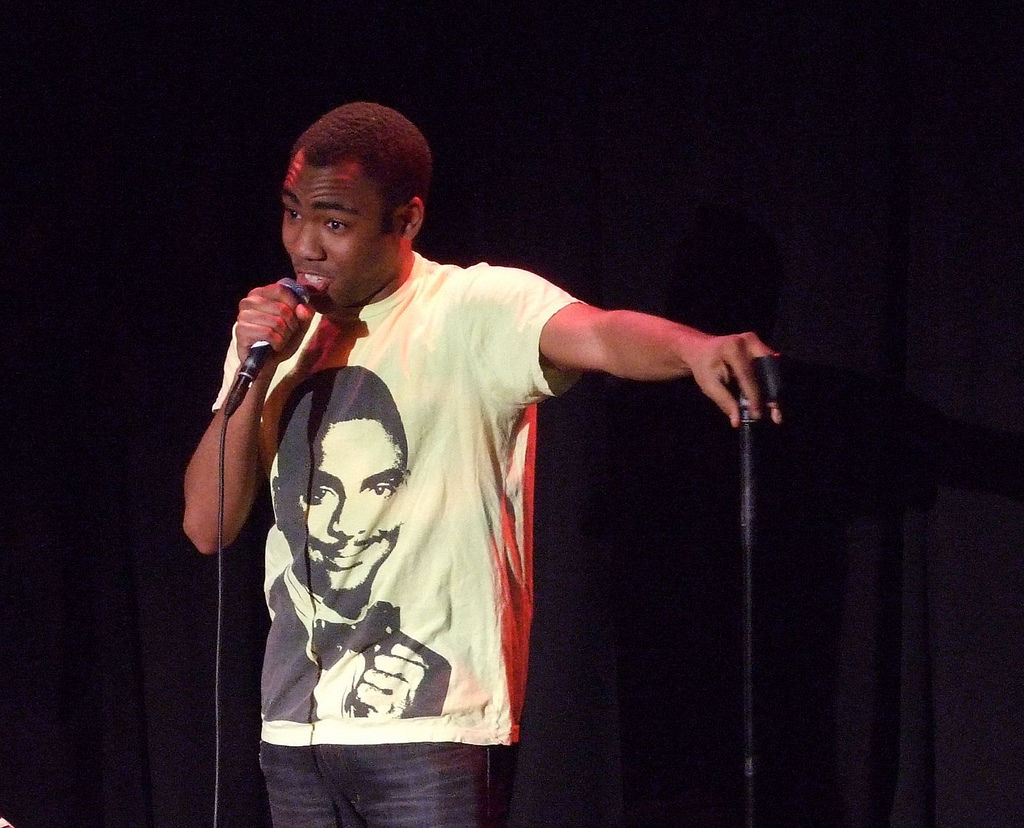
Former 30 Rock writer Donald Glover appeared on camera as an alternate version of Tracy Jordan for this episode

Although the full list of guest stars remained a secret up to airing, Fey revealed that former 30 Rock writer Donald Glover and previous guest star Jon Hamm would appear. Prior to the West Coast airing, guest star Kim Kardashian previewed that she would appear on the episode.

== Television ==
Like "Live Show", "Live from Studio 6H" relies on self-reflective comedy and references to classic late night television. This episode includes extended skits referencing The Honeymooners, Amos and Andy, Laugh-In, The Dean Martin Show, telethons, and news broadcasts from the 1950s through 1980s. In addition, the show closed with an on-stage good-bye in the style of Saturday Night Live, owing to the strong overlap in cast and crew of the two programs. Hazel's attention-grabbing stunt explicitly parodied a 1992 SNL appearance by O'Connor where she ripped up a picture of Pope John Paul II. The proposal scene parodied Mad Men episode "A Little Kiss".

The satire of Laugh-In includes the mailbox reference to H. R. Haldeman from "Rosemary's Baby" (despite explicitly taking place during the Johnson administration). Baldwin reprises his Nixon impression from "Subway Hero" in parodying Nixon's "Sock it to me?" cameo from September 1968.

As The A.V. Club noted, this episode was more self-consciously nostalgic of television history than "Live Show" and Ellen Gray of The Philadelphia Inquirer has pointed out that having a live show for sweeps is itself a television tradition.

== Reception ==
Meredith Blake of The A.V. Club gave the episode a B, praising its nostalgia for television and daring to break out of a strictly scripted format, but criticizing it for having too loose of a structure and relying on skits and cameos. Entertainment Weekly's Breia Brissey also gave it a positive review and praised its overview of television history. Frazier Moore of the Associated Press characterized it as "full of fun" and "very lively." The energetic pace of the episode was also praised by The Huffington Post's Chris Harnick, explaining that it "was an excuse to play dress up and have fun—and that's just what they did." Andy Greenwald of Grantland characterized the episode as "a balletic, inspired, and insane live half-hour about the importance and visceral thrill of live television."

The Alfie and Abner segment, parodying Amos 'n' Andy, caused controversy for its potential to reproduce negative stereotypes about African Americans.
