= Today You Are a Man =

- 30 Rock episode
- Episode no.: Season 6 Episode 5
- Directed by: Jeff Richmond
- Written by: Ron Weiner
- Production code: 605
- Original air date: February 2, 2012

Guest appearances
- Kristen Schaal as Hazel Wassername; Nicholas Dayton as Adam Goldstein; Josh Fadem as Simon Behrens; Suze Orman as herself

Episode chronology
| ← Previous "The Ballad of Kenneth Parcell" | Next → "Hey, Baby, What's Wrong" |
- 30 Rock season 6

"Today You Are a Man" is the fifth episode of the sixth season of the American television comedy series 30 Rock, and the 108th overall episode of the series. It was directed by Jeff Richmond, and written by co-executive producer Ron Weiner. The episode originally aired on NBC in the United States on February 2, 2012. Guest stars in this episode include Kristen Schaal, Nicholas Dayton, Josh Fadem, and Suze Orman.

In the episode, Liz Lemon (Tina Fey) goes head to head with Jack Donaghy (Alec Baldwin) to negotiate over her contract, Kenneth Parcell (Jack McBrayer) considers quitting the page program after he discovers that nobody had missed him during his absence in the previous episode, and Tracy Jordan (Tracy Morgan) and Jenna Maroney (Jane Krakowski) are hired as the entertainment for a bar mitzvah.

== Plot ==
Liz Lemon's (Tina Fey) old agent Simon Behrens (Josh Fadem) informs her that her contract is almost up and that Jack Donaghy (Alec Baldwin) has sent her a new one. Annoyed that Jack would expect her to blindly sign a new contract, Liz decides to negotiate with him for better pay and conditions. She meets with Simon at the library and discovers a seminar tape Jack had recorded called Negotiating to Win. She starts using Jack's own techniques on him in the negotiation, which he recognizes and is pleased with, since it is now an even playing field between the pair. The two meet at an ice-cream shop, where it seems that Jack has won the negotiation, which prompts him to negotiate with himself in a mirror on Liz's behalf, where he accidentally wins for her.

Meanwhile, Kenneth Parcell (Jack McBrayer) returns from his temporary firing, only to realize that no one noticed his absence. Hurt, he decides to switch to The Suze Orman Show and provides the TGS crew with an inadequate new page named Hazel Wassername (Kristen Schaal). Kenneth ends up speaking with Suze Orman. She tells Kenneth that the reason his TGS friends don't view him as an equal is because he doesn't earn as much as them.

Elsewhere, Tracy Jordan (Tracy Morgan) and Jenna Maroney (Jane Krakowski) are hired by their accountant as entertainment for his son's bar mitzvah. They end up being forced to act as Transformers to appease the boy (Nicholas Dayton). The pair come to realize that the boy was only making ridiculous demands because he was nervous about dancing with a girl. This leads Tracy and Jenna to realize that their own demanding behaviour may be along the same lines, so they pledge to put an end to their selfishness.

Finally, the TGS crew recognize their mistake and lure Kenneth to a farewell party. They believe Tracy can convince Kenneth to return because Tracy depends on him so much. However, to everyone's surprise, Tracy does the selfless thing and tells Kenneth to find a better job. Jack invites Liz back to his office, where he laments on his failure to win the negotiation. He sorrowfully questions his abilities as a businessman. Feeling guilty, Liz yields to him and he reveals that this was his plan. He wanted to prove to himself that he could still win. Nonetheless, he signs the contract that Liz had won, assuring her that he intends to take care of her anyway. At this point, Kenneth arrives and asks Jack if he can talk to him about a better position in the company. This request is met with an affirmative response from Jack.

== Reception ==
According to the Nielsen Media Research, this episode of 30 Rock was watched by 3.23 million households in its original American broadcast. It earned a 1.3 rating/4 share in the 18–49 demographic. This means that it was seen by 1.3 percent of all 18- to 49-year-olds, and 4 percent of all 18- to 49-year-olds watching television at the time of the broadcast. It was noted in the report that there was an apparent widespread DVR technical error, caused by television listings mistakenly carrying information pertaining to the previous episode, broadcast at 9:00 p.m. on January 26. This led to recorders not recording the episode, which negatively impacted upon the rating.

The episode received mostly positive reviews from critics. Kevin Fitzpatrick of TV Over Mind called the episode "a fantastic reminder of how 30 Rock could never do without Alec Baldwin, who takes such manic delight in switching characters rapidly and playing off himself". He went on to comment on the age of the show, adding "stories of late either deliberately or otherwise call back to past plotlines [...] but provided things build to some actual alteration to the status quo, or at the very least a little welcomely-acknowledged nostalgia before the end, there’s still plenty of room for growth in this six year relationship". Nathan Rabin of The A.V. Club commented favourably upon the episode, opining that it "illustrates there’s plenty of juice left in the show’s well-oiled machinery". He awarded it a B+.
