= Live Show =

- 30 Rock episode
- The cast of 30 Rock and their special guests bid goodnight to the live audience at the end of "Live Show" in a tribute to Saturday Night Live
- Episode no.: Season 5 Episode 4
- Directed by: Beth McCarthy-Miller
- Written by: Robert Carlock
- Production code: 504
- Original air date: October 14, 2010

Guest appearances
- Rachel Dratch as Jadwiga; Matt Damon as Carol; Bill Hader as Kevin, Carol's co-pilot; Jon Hamm as Drew Baird; Julia Louis-Dreyfus as Liz Lemon in cut-away sequences; Garrett Neff as 40-year-old Jack; Chris Parnell as Dr. Leo Spaceman

Episode chronology
← Previous "Let's Stay Together"	Next → "Reaganing"
- 30 Rock season 5

"Live Show" is the fourth episode of the fifth season of the American television comedy series 30 Rock, and the 84th episode overall. It was directed by Beth McCarthy-Miller, and co-written by series creator Tina Fey and co-showrunner and executive producer Robert Carlock. The episode originally aired live on the NBC television network in the United States on October 14, 2010, with separate versions for the East and West Coast television audiences. "Live Show" featured appearances by Rachel Dratch, Bill Hader, Matt Damon, Jon Hamm, and Julia Louis-Dreyfus.

30 Rock follows the production of the fictional sketch comedy program The Girlie Show with Tracy Jordan (TGS). In this episode, on the night of a show, head writer Liz Lemon grows increasingly infuriated when no one seems to remember her 40th birthday. Just before TGS's live taping, Tracy Jordan decides to break character, to his co-workers' chagrin. Meanwhile, television executive Jack Donaghy struggles with the consequences of his promise to give up drinking while his girlfriend Avery Jessup is pregnant with their child.

"Live Show" was an experiment for 30 Rock—filming with a multiple-camera setup before a studio audience to broadcast live—and the episode received positive reviews for its boldness as well as the nostalgia it showed for classic sitcom conventions and meta-humor—for instance, guest star Louis-Dreyfus portrays Liz Lemon in some cutaway scenes where it would be physically impossible for series regular Fey to be on two separate stages at once. The episode was also a ratings success, improving upon the audience that 30 Rock had grown since its previous season.

On June 22, 2020, it was revealed that the East Coast version would be one of the episodes being pulled from syndication due to issues with the presence of blackface and other racially insensitive humor; the West Coast version would remain since it did not include the offending scene.

== Plot ==
Liz Lemon—the head writer of The Girlie Show with Tracy Jordan (TGS)—is preparing to air another episode of TGS, but is angry that her co-workers have forgotten her 40th birthday. Tracy Jordan frustrates her further by deciding to break character during the show's live broadcast in an homage to The Carol Burnett Show. TGS co-star Jenna Maroney is determined to not let Tracy upstage her and declares she will have a deliberate wardrobe malfunction and bare her breast on live television if Tracy does not stop. As the show goes awry due to Tracy and Jenna's unprofessionalism, Liz is forced to cut away from their regularly scheduled programming to commercials for Dr. Leo Spaceman's new album of erotic ballads to cure erectile dysfunction and Drew Baird's public service announcement for hand-transplant surgery.

Meanwhile, Jack Donaghy struggles with a promise that he made to his girlfriend Avery Jessup—he will not drink alcohol during her entire pregnancy in a show of solidarity with her. Instead, he takes up knitting and stage magic, but finds the urge to drink so strong that he begins sniffing paint cans and Jenna's breath just to get a whiff of alcohol. During TGS, Liz gets a phone call from her boyfriend airline pilot Carol informing her that he is going through extreme turbulence and may crash his plane.

In the final act of the show, Jack conspires with the cast and crew to give Liz a last-minute birthday surprise which he wants to appear as though it had been planned all along. Meanwhile, Carol safely lands his plane and rushes to greet Liz on set. All they can muster on short notice is a polka band and a large cake with Fonzie on it—gifts that were intended to celebrate janitor Jadwiga's birthday. Jadwiga proceeds to ruin the TGS goodnights and tears into the cake with her bare hands. In Jack's office, Liz and Jack share a drink as Liz's birthday wish. In the final scene, as Jack takes a drink, the program reverts to a pre-recorded segment and Jack says, "That's more like it." The episode ends with a live goodnight from its cast on the TGS stage, a la Saturday Night Live.

== Production ==
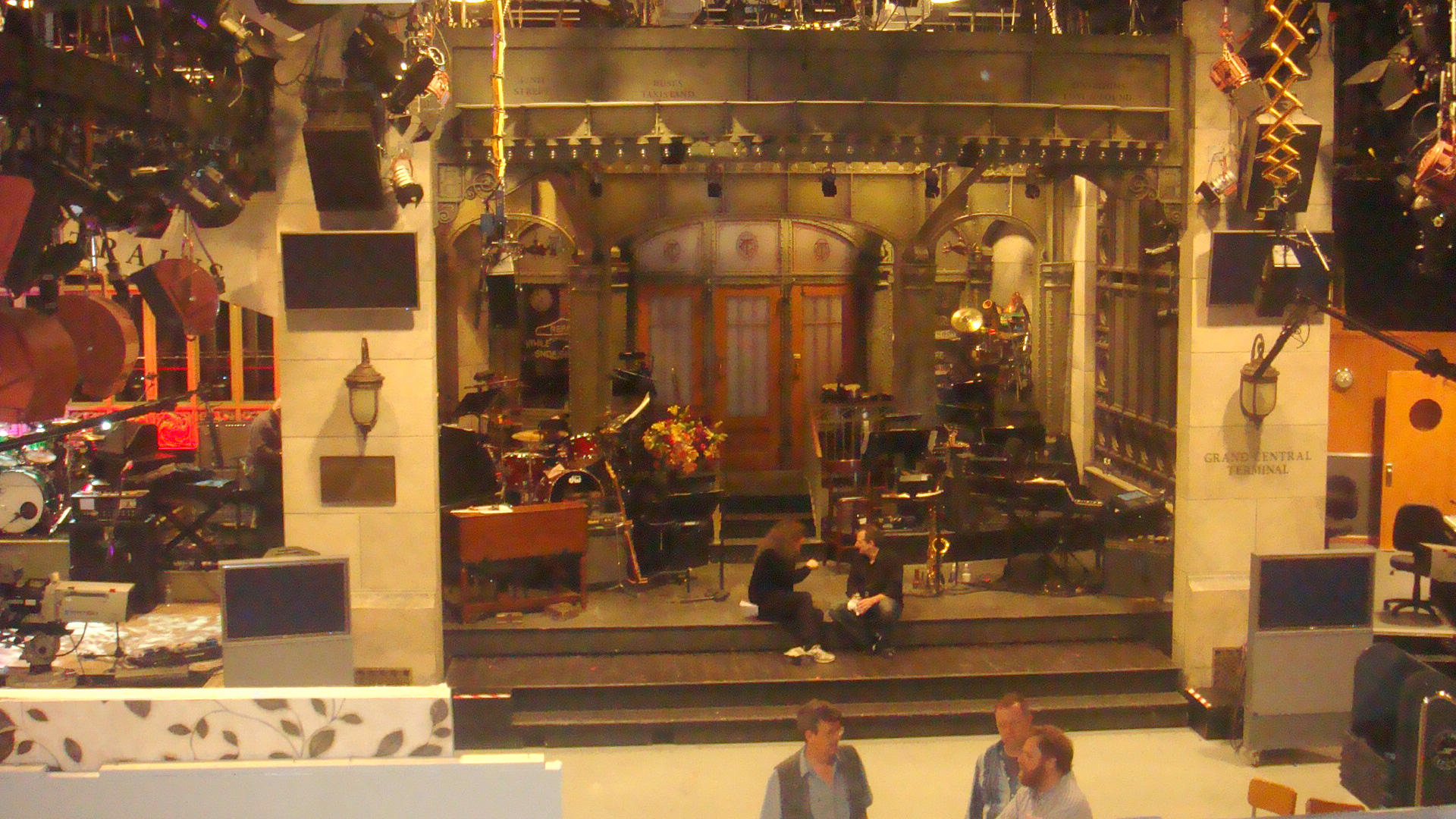
Studio 8H in the GE Building at 30 Rockefeller Plaza is where Saturday Night Live (SNL) is filmed and was used as the location for "Live Show". 30 Rock is loosely based on creator Tina Fey's experience on that program and several SNL alumni participated in the filming of this episode.

"Live Show" was co-written by series creator, executive producer, and lead actress Fey and co-showrunner and executive producer Robert Carlock. It was directed by Beth McCarthy-Miller, a long-time television director who worked with Fey on the sketch comedy show Saturday Night Live.

On July 30, 2010, the NBC network announced that an episode of 30 Rock's fifth season would be filmed and broadcast live on two occasions in the evening of October 14, 2010. The decision was made in part due to lagging ratings for all of NBC's Must-See TV line-up. The idea was originally conceived during the 2007–2008 Writers Guild of America strike, when the cast performed two live versions of the season two episode "Secrets and Lies" as a benefit at the Upright Citizens Brigade Theatre in New York City. When asked by Entertainment Weekly the reason for doing a live episode, Fey said "[The live performance] was what made us think that it would be fun to do [a live episode]. And how far we've come... Now we're going to do it on TV." In this same interview, Fey revealed that the episode would also be performed in front of a live audience. "It will be exciting for us to do it for a live audience and see if we get live laughter."

Fey noted that the experience "was so fun to feel the different timing of the show live and the audience response, which you just don't get in a single-camera show." In another interview, Fey revealed that the staff have talked about doing a live show for years "because we felt we had sort of interesting personnel for it." Following the conclusion of the writers' strike they spoke to NBC about performing live and attempted to film it during the fourth season; however, they were unable to schedule it. For the fifth season, the writing staff began planning the live performance and waited until McCarthy-Miller—a recurring 30 Rock director—was available to helm it. Fey and Carlock said in separate discussions that another decision to do this episode of 30 Rock was based on the cast having theater and improvisation experience. Alec Baldwin had previously performed in the East and West live broadcasts of the Will & Grace season 8 premiere episode, "Alive and Schticking".

Prior to the broadcast, the cast rehearsed "Live Show" for three days and had one rehearsal before a live audience the day of broadcast. The two separate broadcasts of the episode resulted in a live telecast to American viewers in both the East and West Coasts of the United States (with viewers in the Central Time Zone receiving the East Coast feed live, per standard U.S. broadcasting practice)—the crew briefly considered a third broadcast for the Mountain Time Zone, but decided against it. The initial East Coast broadcast included a theme song sung by Jane Krakowski and the later West Coast version's song was performed by Cheyenne Jackson—the two also performed to warm-up the crowd in the rehearsal. In addition, the two episodes had a few scripted differences, such as the lyrics to Spaceman's song, Liz Lemon mocking Jack Donaghy's office assistant Jonathan by referring to him as a character from Slumdog Millionaire in the East Coast broadcast and as Aladdin in the West Coast airing, and the subtitle in the Fox News skit. Additionally, the fictional commercial that featured Drew Baird is different—in the East Coast broadcast he is given a hand transplant from an executed black man; in the West Coast broadcast he has a woman's hand. This episode marks Rachel Dratch's first appearance on 30 Rock since season one, and her first work since giving birth to her son Eli on August 24, 2010.

The DVD includes the West Coast version as a bonus feature, but not the entire East Coast version. Instead, the primary version of the episode as presented on DVD is edited together from both East and West, trimmed for time (some scenes are missing and some transitions and awkward pauses are shortened), and presented with standard cast and crew credits (as opposed to the SNL-style crawl), presumably to fit standard rerun length and format. The mix-and-match episode uses the West Coast version for most of the first seven-and-a-half minutes (except Jenna's East Coast title sequence), cuts Jenna's "It's Your Birthday, Slut" sequence and the second Yadwiga scene ("sit on it") entirely, and uses West for various short parts (including, most likely, part of the Fox News sketch preparation, half a minute before Carol's phone call, a minute from the last few moments of the call to "I will slip a nip", the first twenty seconds of Jack's paint can sniffing scene, Jenna's nip slip threat before the second commercial ("to commercial go!"), possibly Jack's Capital One plug, and the last seventy seconds or so of the birthday cake scene). It doesn't use the West Coast version for the next moments of the paint can scene where Jack's grammar is corrected. As a result, some differences outlined in the other Alternate Versions entry won't be available to anyone with the DVD, including the Slumdog Millionaire variant listed above and many flubs and goofs.

=== Connection with television tropes ===
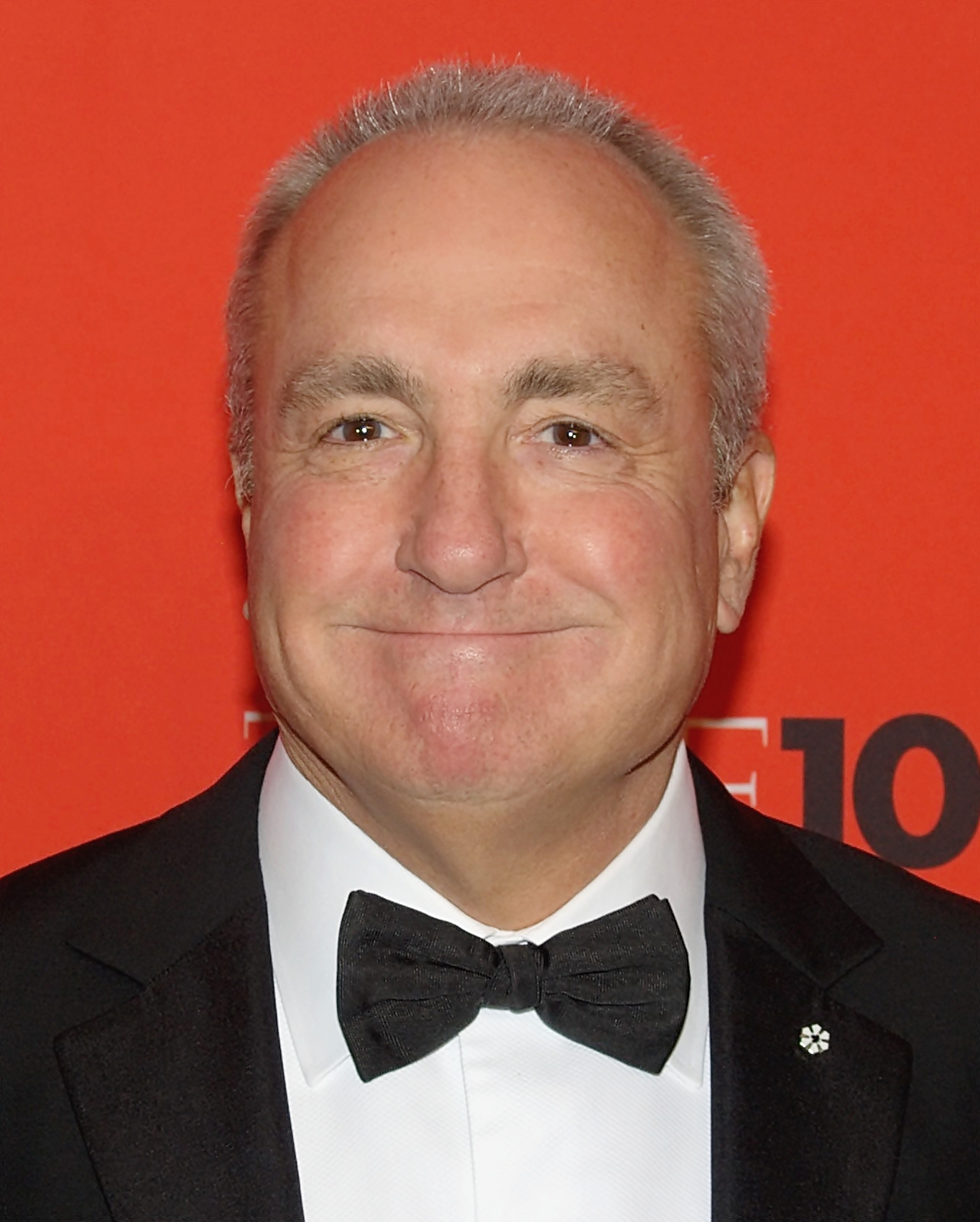
Long-time SNL producer Lorne Michaels was on hand at the rehearsal and both performances for "Live Show" to offer his support.

As the live broadcast of "Live Show" was recorded with TV cameras edited live to video rather than film stock, the video quality for this episode was noticeably different from standard episodes of 30 Rock. Jack acknowledges this at the start of the episode by asking why everything looks like a "Mexican soap opera." Throughout the episode, the characters broke the fourth wall: Tracy Jordan's unprofessional acting within the TGS episode, Jack's references to the video quality, Julia Louis-Dreyfus' portrayal of Liz in cut-away sequences, and the re-hashing of standard sitcom plot elements.

In addition, there were several connections with SNL: Fey, Morgan, Dratch, Bill Hader, Louis-Dreyfus, Parnell, and director McCarthy-Miller are all SNL alumni (fellow alumnus Will Ferrell was asked to reprise his recurring "Bitch Hunter" character, but had a scheduling conflict); the show was filmed in SNL's Studio 8H before a live audience; the ending sequence was a good night from the cast while the credits scrolled (and the credits used the same font as SNL); and promos leading up to the episode were voiced by long-time SNL announcer Don Pardo. The music for the episode—both for the TGS sequences and incidental underscore—was provided live by the SNL house band under the direction of Fey's husband Jeff Richmond and Leon Pendarvis. Furthermore, long-time SNL producer Lorne Michaels attended the rehearsal and performances to give his advice. Each commercial break during the show was predicated on an emergency commercial break on TGS, including a fictional commercial and a fake NBC technical difficulties screen.

=== Blackface scene ===
The "blackface" scene is a short skit where a white male character (Jon Hamm), who had both hands replaced with hooks, having lost them in accidents, announces he has been the recipient of a hand transplant. However, as in a horror movie, the transplanted hand has a mind of its own and acts independently. In the East Coast version, the transplanted hand is from a black male executed criminal. In the West Coast version, the transplanted hand is from a white female who lost it in an explosion at a Josh Groban concert.

== Reception ==
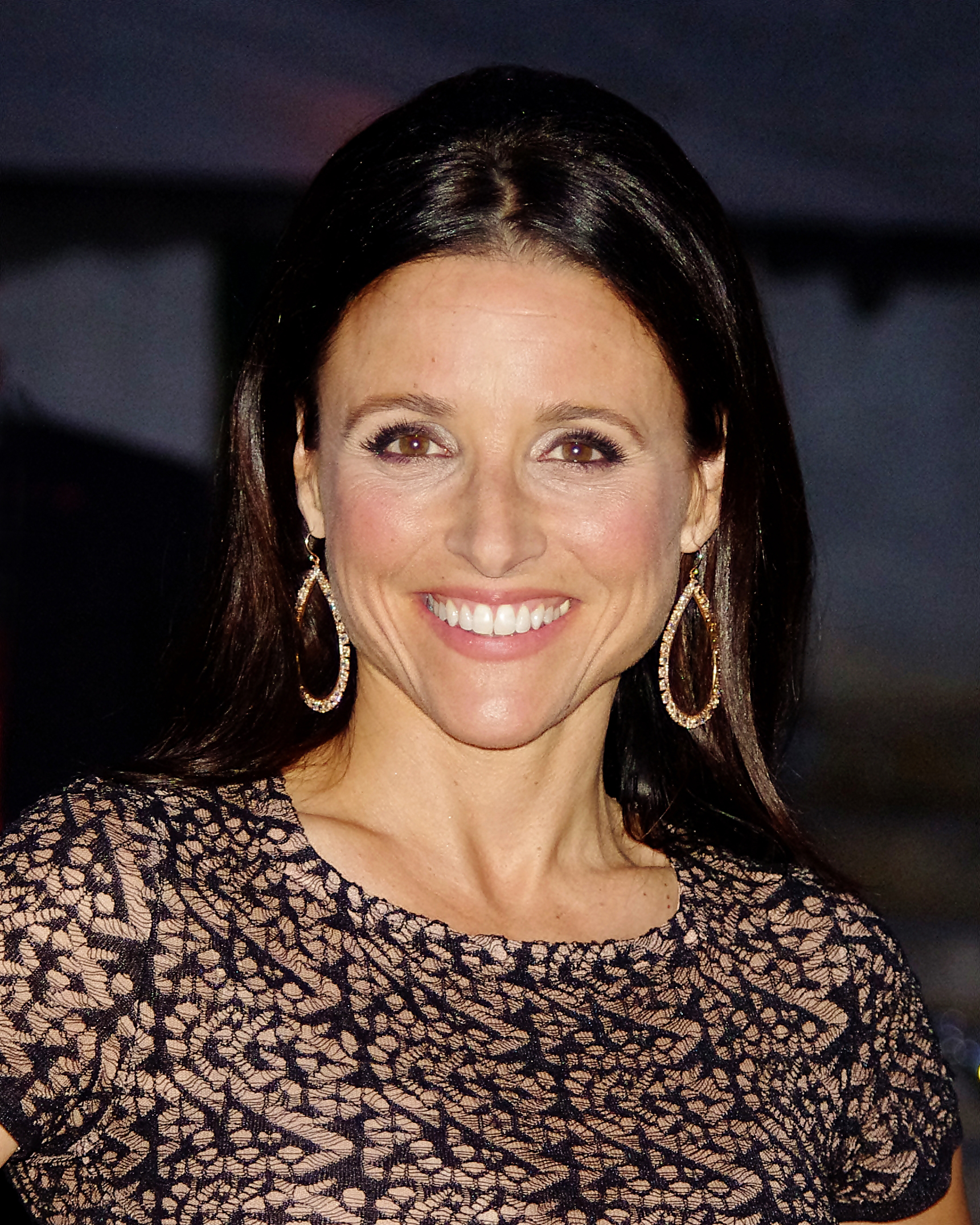
Julia Louis-Dreyfus' unexpected portrayal of Liz Lemon was praised by critics.

"Live Show" drew in the largest audience for 30 Rock, season five, with 6.701 million viewers, and reached a season high 3.1 Nielsen rating/9% share with adults 18–49, which was a 43% increase over the previous episode and a 15% increase from the season premiere; it trailed CBS competitor and timeslot leader $h*! My Dad Says by 0.1. This rating was the show's highest since December 10, 2009, episode "Secret Santa" and the highest overall for NBC in the 8:30 p.m. Thursday timeslot for non-sports events since December 2009.

Critical reception of the episode was largely positive. Emily St. James of The A.V. Club gave the episode an A−, noting the nostalgia for classic television and specifically three-camera sitcoms that this episode displayed. While the pace and tone of "Live Show" were different from a standard episode of 30 Rock, the author considers this episode, "an experiment, as a weird hybrid of 30 Rock, an old sitcom, and Saturday Night Live" and ultimately a success. James Poniewozik of Time also wrote that the episode was uneven, but successful as a tribute to television. TV Squad's Bob Sassone was impressed by the episode, specifically Fey's performance and Louis-Dreyfus' imitation of Liz Lemon. Other positive reviews have noted the lack of mistakes in the comic timing and performance, the strength of the guest stars, and the performers' ability to keep up the pace that is expected in a 30 Rock episode. Frazier Moore of the Associated Press gave the episode a negative review, calling it "vaudevillian" and "a slice of self-indulgence and excess." Mark Perigard of the Boston Herald considered the episode "so-so" due to its "humdrum script." As a live television experiment, reviewers have considered it a success, particularly in reference to other live broadcast experiments, such as NBC drama ER's 1997 episode "Ambush" and SNL, with Entertainment Weekly declaring it "like SNL, only funny." In reviewing the best television programs of 2010, The A.V. Club named 30 Rock number 18 and cited this episode as amongst the best of the year. McCarthy-Miller was nominated for a Primetime Emmy Award for Outstanding Directing for a Comedy Series for this episode.

On March 21, 2012, Baldwin announced in an interview with Extra that a second live episode — "Live from Studio 6H" — would air the following April 26.
