= Live television =

Type of broadcast medium

Live television is a television production broadcast in real-time, as events happen, in the present. In a secondary meaning, it may refer to streaming television where all viewers watch the same stream simultaneously, rather than watching video on demand.

Shows broadcast live include newscasts, morning shows, awards shows, sports programs, reality programs and, occasionally, episodes of scripted television series.

Live television was more common until the late 1950s, when videotape technology was invented. Because of the prohibitive cost, adoption was slow, and some scripted television shows remained live until the 1970s, such as soap operas. To prevent unforeseen issues, live television programs may be delayed, which allows censors to edit the program. Some programs may be broadcast live in certain time zones and delayed in others.

== Types of programs ==
From the early days of television until about 1958, live television was used heavily, except for filmed programs such as I Love Lucy and Gunsmoke. Although videotape was invented in 1956, it cost $300 per one hour reel (equivalent to $3,553 in 2025) slowing its adoption. Some genres, such as soap operas, did not completely abandon live broadcasts until the mid-1970s.

In general, a live television program was more common for broadcasting content produced specifically for commercial television in the early years of the medium, before technologies such as video tape appeared. As video tape recorders (VTR) became more prevalent, many entertainment programs were recorded and edited before broadcasting rather than being shown live.

=== Morning shows ===
As of September 2021, television networks provide most live television for morning shows with television programs such as: Good Morning Britain, BBC Breakfast, This Morning, Breakfast with Eamonn and Isabel, etc. broadcast live in the United Kingdom; Sunrise live in Australia; Your Morning live in Canada; and Today, Good Morning America, and CBS Mornings in the United States, which air live only in the Eastern Time Zone. The only exceptions are CBS Saturday Morning and Sunday Today with Willie Geist, which air live in the Eastern and Central time zones. Spanish-language morning shows (such as Despierta America and Un Nuevo Día), unlike their English-speaking counterparts, air live in across the mainland United States except for viewers in the Pacific time zone, which, along with viewers in Hawaii and Alaska, have tape-delayed shows.

A few daytime talk shows in the American broadcast live before a studio audience in select time zones. Shows such as Live with Kelly and Mark and Sherri air live in the Eastern time zone only, while ABC's The View air live in the Eastern and Central time zones. A separate program is taped on Thursday afternoon for airing on Friday. Affiliates in the remaining time zones air these programs on a tape delay. Most other daytime talk shows and late night programs are taped before a live studio audience earlier in the day and edited for later broadcast.

=== Entertainment shows ===
Major entertainment events, such as award shows and beauty pageants, are often broadcast live in primetime hours based on American East Coast's schedule. In the 21st century, reality competition franchises began to emerge (such as, in the United States, American Idol and Dancing with the Stars), where viewers could vote for their favorite acts featured in live performances, but American Idol, as of 2026, is the only reality competition series to have broadcast live in all American territories at the same time.

Scheduling of live entertainment programming may be complicated in countries that span multiple time zones, such as Mexico, Canada and the United States, where programming is aired live in the easternmost time zones, but may be delayed in order to air in local primetime hours in western markets (although since the last decade, Canada and Mexico have regularly televised all major live events simultaneously across all of their territories).

Historically, live global sports and breaking international news programming are usually broadcast live in all time zones worldwide. Several award shows began to air live in all time zones worldwide in order to avert the need to avoid "spoilers" via the internet and social media outlets in the onset of the latter's rise in the late 2000s. For decades, the Academy Awards have continuously broadcast live in Alaska and both American coasts (and now including Hawaii and American Samoa by the late 2010s) and are later joined by the Golden Globe Awards since the early 2010s. In recent years, the Primetime Emmy Awards, Grammy Awards and Tony Awards have joined airing live in all American territories.

Some award shows like the Billboard Music Awards and the MTV Video Music Awards have switched annually between delayed and live nationwide telecasts since the mid-2010s as a result of the declining viewership across live event television in the same period.

=== News shows ===
Most local television station newscasts are broadcast live in the United States as they are an essential medium for providing up-to-the-minute weather forecasts and breaking news stories. Broadcast television networks in the United States typically air their evening newscasts live in the Eastern and Central time zones. A separate "Western Edition" is broadcast to viewers in the Pacific Time Zone to account for latest news updates and may sometimes be a second live broadcast with the same running time as the original East Coast airing. When a major breaking news event occurs, whether nationally or globally, broadcast television networks will break into regularly scheduled programming and will televise a live "special report" in all time zones. Local television stations break into regularly scheduled programming in the event of severe weather warnings or major local breaking news stories that occur within their viewing area.

Cable news outlets (such as CNN and Fox News Channel) air continuous live programming during the day, and air rebroadcasts of earlier live shows during the late-night hours, except in cases where breaking news occurs.The PBS NewsHour airs live on PBS stations in the Eastern Time Zone. Sunday morning news programs in the USA such as Meet the Press on NBC, This Week on ABC, and Fox News Sunday air live in the Eastern Time Zone (including a limited number of small markets in the Central Time Zone), while CBS Sunday Morning and Face The Nation on CBS air live in the Eastern and Central time zones.

Cable outlets (such as CNN and Fox News Channel) incorporate the word LIVE in their network logo (also known as a digital on-screen graphic) when those networks broadcast live content. Some (but not all) sports cable networks will opt to insert the word LIVE somewhere on the corner of the screen. With the exception of special breaking news reports and overseas sporting events, broadcast television networks rarely display such a graphic during its live programming. (although NBC did display the word LIVE next to their logo during its Olympic coverage when live content was being broadcast, a practice that was continued by its sister station, NBCSN, until its closure in 2021.)

Local television station newscasts display time and temperature during their broadcasts, and only display the word LIVE when they air a news report or a live shot on location. Some networks have begun to insert (in addition to the word LIVE) the local time of where that news report is originating from, particularly when that report is airing live via satellite from overseas.

=== Sports ===
As of the current decade, major sporting events like the World Series, Super Bowl, World Cup, NBA Finals, and Olympic Games have been broadcast entirely live in all U.S. territories, encompassing both prime time hours of both U.S. coasts, simultaneous with the live global telecasts of these events in accordance with the official international broadcasters of such games.

=== Other ===
Other events that air live all across American territories include multi-network coverage of American presidential and congressional elections, American presidential inaugurations, the State of the Union Address, presidential news conferences, Presidential Addresses to the Nation, the Tournament of Roses Parade, and funerals of major national or international public and religious figures. Local television stations air live local election coverage and special events, such as large scale parades, big city marathons, funerals of major local public and religious figures, inauguration ceremonies of big city mayors and governors, installation masses of cardinals or bishops in a major Catholic archdiocese, and pep rallies for a major sports team. In the UK, events such as the State Opening of Parliament are broadcast live.

== Uses of live television ==
Live television is often used as a device, even in scripted programming to take advantage of these often to great success in terms of attracting viewers. The NBC live comedy/variety program Saturday Night Live, for example, has been on that network continuously since 1975 and airs live in the Eastern and Central zones (including the Pacific and Mountain zones beginning 2017 in its transition to its first live season all across the continental United States beginning 2018) during the show's season which runs from October though May.

On September 25, 1997, NBC aired two separate live broadcasts (for viewers in both American coasts) of an episode of ER, which at the time was the most watched American television program overall. Many television news programs, particularly local news ones in North America, have also used live television as a device to gain audience viewers by making their programs appear more exciting. With technologies such as production trucks, satellite truck uplinks, a news reporter can report live "on location" from anywhere where a story is happening in the city. This technique has attracted criticism for its overuse (like minor car accidents which often have no injuries) and resulting tendency to make stories appear more urgent than they actually are.

The unedited nature of live television can pose problems for broadcasters because of the potential for mishaps, such as anchors being interrupted or harassed by bystanders shouting profane phrases. In 2015, a female CityNews journalist confronted a group of young men who had used such a phrase; one of them later lost his job after he was identified. Channels often broadcast live programs on a slight delay (usually of less than ten seconds) to give them the ability to censor words and images while keeping the broadcast as "live" as possible.

== Notable events on live television ==
Many events have happened on live television broadcasts that are well-remembered, sometimes because they were part of a major breaking news story already, and always because they happened unexpectedly and before audiences of thousands or millions of viewers.

=== News ===
- September 30, 1929 – The BBC made the world's first television broadcast to British audiences: it is a live transmission.
- September 4, 1951 – The first national live television broadcast in the U.S. took place when President Harry Truman's speech at the Japanese Peace Treaty Conference in San Francisco, California, was transmitted over AT&T's transcontinental cable and microwave radio relay system to broadcast stations in local markets.
- January 14, 1952 – The Today Show, the first broadcast morning news program in the U.S., premieres. Initially airing live in the Eastern and Central time zones up until 1958, nowadays this program airs live only in the Eastern Time Zone.
- July 1952; first live national broadcasts of United States presidential nominating conventions
- March 30, 1953 – Crown Prince Akihito of Japan's departure from the Port of Yokohama on the SS President Wilson to attend the coronation of Elizabeth II in the United Kingdom was the first live television news broadcast in Japan.
- June 2, 1953 – The coronation of Elizabeth II, screened live on television in the United Kingdom, is influential in encouraging sales of television sets.
- July 23, 1962 – The first live transatlantic television broadcast via the Telstar I satellite.
- November 25, 1963 – The State funeral of John F. Kennedy was broadcast on live TV. It was seen by perhaps what was the largest viewing audience up to then. It was the first live TV coverage of a Presidential funeral. Kennedy had been assassinated in Dallas, Texas, three days before, on November 22, 1963. The assassination itself initiated four days of non-stop live television news coverage seen by millions.
- November 13, 1965 – Critic and author Kenneth Tynan became the first person to say the word "fuck" on British television on the live satirical programme BBC-3 while commenting on censorship during a TV debate.
- December 24, 1968 – Apollo 8 Genesis reading during the ninth orbit of the Moon
- July 20–21, 1969 – Apollo 11, the first astronauts walking on the Moon after the first human landing. This event, broadcast live by nearly every television station in operation at the time, was viewed by 125 million viewers in the U.S. (93% of its television audience), and was the first live satellite broadcast in the State of Alaska. It was estimated to have been seen by 600 million viewers worldwide.
- November 7, 1970 – Felix Dennis, in a group interview on The Frost Programme, became the first person to say "cunt" on live TV.
- July 15, 1974 – Christine Chubbuck, a television news reporter for station WXLT-TV in Sarasota, Florida, committed suicide on live television by firing a revolver shot into her head.
- June 1, 1980 – CNN is launched as the world's first 24-hour news channel.
- January 28, 1986 – The Space Shuttle Challenger disaster was seen on live TV by millions in the U.S., although the actual explosion was only broadcast live by CNN.
- February 9, 1988 – Bank robber Phillip Hutchinson led police on a terrifying chase in Denver, Colorado. It was filmed by a news helicopter cameraman in one of the first ever recorded police chases to be featured in the news. The pilot of the news helicopter assisted police by landing directly in front of Hutchinson during his escape and stopped him from fleeing with a hostage in a stolen pickup truck. Hutchinson was then shot dead by police after refusing to surrender and threatening his hostage with a gun. The hostage escaped unharmed, but Hutchinson's death was filmed live by the news cameraman.
- February 5, 1989 – Sky News is launched as Europe's first 24-hour news channel.
- November 9, 1989 – Live coverage of the abolition of travel restrictions and the opening of the border to West Berlin after mass panic and jubilation from East Germans.
- June 17, 1994 – The O. J. Simpson murder case slow-speed car chase of a Ford Bronco vehicle containing American football star and murder suspect O. J. Simpson was broadcast live throughout the U.S., with NBC interrupting its coverage of the 1994 NBA Finals to do so.
- April 30, 1998 – Daniel V. Jones, a cancer and HIV-positive patient apparently frustrated with his HMO coverage, ended a live televised stand-off with police on a Los Angeles freeway by committing suicide, shooting himself in the chin with a shotgun. The event, which took place on a Thursday afternoon, was witnessed by many children whose after-school cartoons had been interrupted in order to broadcast the incident, which originally began as a high-speed pursuit, and led many to criticize Los Angeles television stations' practice of airing police pursuits live.
- September 11, 2001 – At 9:03 am Eastern Daylight Time, United Airlines Flight 175 crashed into the south tower of the World Trade Center, in front of millions of viewers who were already watching live coverage of the unfolding terrorist attacks of that day. Major networks had broken into regular programming just minutes earlier with live shots of the twin towers after American Airlines Flight 11 crashed into the north tower at 8:46 am. Millions of viewers around the world watching live coverage of the attacks saw both buildings collapse.
- March 23, 2003 – Sky News broadcast live coverage of US forces attacking an Iraqi position. Sky reporter David Bowden, embedded with the US Marines, gave a live running commentary on the battle, something viewers had not seen before.
- July 7, 2005 – A live television report on the unfolding situation on the 7 July 2005 London bombings captured the sound of the Tavistock Square bus explosion at 9:46 am British Summer Time.
- July 27, 2007 – Two news helicopters collided in midair over Phoenix, Arizona, while covering a police pursuit. One of the helicopters was broadcasting live; viewers heard the collision and a scream before the station cut to the studio.
- September 28, 2012 – 33-year-old Jodon F. Romero committed suicide in a field after he carjacked a vehicle in Phoenix and went on an 80-mile car chase. This was accidentally broadcast on Studio B with Shepard Smith.
- August 26, 2015 – Murders of Alison Parker and Adam Ward: A news reporter and cameraman are murdered on live television by a former coworker during a news report. Shooter Vester Flanagan committed suicide sometime later.
- July 13, 2024 – Donald Trump was shot in the ear in an assassination attempt during live coverage of the Trump rally on various television channels and major news networks near Butler, Pennsylvania.

=== Entertainment & sport ===
- August 1–16, 1936 – The 1936 Summer Olympics, held in Berlin, Germany, were the first Olympic Games (and sporting event) to have live television coverage. ^{[1]}
- May 17, 1939 – The first live televised sporting event in the U.S. takes place: a college baseball game between the Columbia Lions and the Princeton Tigers, was broadcast by NBC from Columbia's Baker Field in New York City. Princeton won that game 8–6.
- March 19, 1953 – First live broadcast of The Academy Awards.
- March 7, 1955 – First nationwide live broadcast of The Emmy Awards.
- November 30, 1958 – Midway through transmission of the Armchair Theatre play Underground on the British ITV network, actor Gareth Jones died off-camera, forcing the cast to improvise the remainder of the broadcast.
- December 7, 1963 – Instant replay is used for the first time during the live transmission of the Army–Navy Game by its inventor, director Tony Verna.
- February 9, 1964 – The Beatles make their first appearance on The Ed Sullivan Show. This live broadcast on CBS drew an estimated 73 million viewers (40% of the American population), the largest audience in the history of American television up to that time.
- April 18, 1966 – The Academy Awards broadcast in color for the first time.
- June 25, 1967 – Our World, the first live international satellite television production aired, seen by 400 million people in 25 countries worldwide. It closed with The Beatles performing a new song: "All You Need Is Love", composed by John Lennon for the occasion.
- September 17, 1967 – While The Doors performed "Light My Fire" on The Ed Sullivan Show, frontman Jim Morrison used the word "higher" instead of the previously agreed-upon change "better". This resulted in the band being banned from the program.
- November 17, 1968 – A football game (known subsequently as the Heidi Game) between the New York Jets and the Oakland Raiders ran over its allotted time. At the time, NBC was contractually bound to air the children's movie Heidi at 7 pm Eastern Time. NBC broke away from the game on the East Coast, after which Oakland scored 2 touchdowns in the final minute to win the game 43–32. This prompted outrage from sports fans, resulting in a change of policy where all televised sports events are now broadcast to its conclusion.
- March 16, 1971 – First live broadcast of The Grammy Awards.
- March 5, 1975 – Graham Kennedy mimicked a crow call ("faaaaaaark") reminiscent of the word fuck during a hairspray ad on The Graham Kennedy Show on the Nine Network in Australia. He was banned from live TV indefinitely for the stunt. He later parted ways with the network on April 17 after the network took advantage of the pre-taping to delete a speech critical of Senator Doug McClelland (the then Minister for the Media), though Kennedy returned years later.
- October 11, 1975 – First episode of Saturday Night Live broadcast in the United States.
- December 1, 1976 – Appearing in a live interview on the Thames Television pre-watershed programme Today as last-minute replacements for fellow EMI artists Queen, the Sex Pistols were interviewed by Bill Grundy to promote their recently released "Anarchy in the U.K." single. During the interview, Steve Jones said the band had "fucking spent" its label advance money and Johnny Rotten used the word "shit." Pistols guitarist Steve Jones called Grundy a "dirty sod" and a "dirty old man", leading Grundy to goad the band into swearing on live TV, and Jones ended the interview with "you dirty bastard," "you dirty fucker," and "what a fucking rotter". The incident quickly became the subject of media attention, Grundy was fired by ITV and Today was cancelled.
- February 20, 1981 – Appearing on the live ABC comedy show Fridays as guest host, comedian Andy Kaufman refused to read his lines during the last sketch, to the annoyance of the cast and crew. The situation escalated into a minor brawl, and the network cut off the broadcast. Kaufman later admitted that the fight was planned by him and some of the cast and crew.
- April 15, 1984 – English comedian Tommy Cooper collapsed and subsequently died of a heart attack in front of millions of viewers on Live from Her Majesty's. The audience carried on laughing thinking it was part of his act, before the programme took a commercial break.
- July 13, 1985 – Live Aid, the first live global concert aired to 1.9 billion viewers in 150 countries worldwide.
- January 4, 1987 – A massive bench-clearing brawl (the so-called Punch-up in Piestany) occurred during the final game of the World Junior Hockey Championships between Canada and the Soviet Union in Piešťany, Czechoslovakia (now located in Slovakia). After Pavel Kostichkin took a two-handed slash at Canada's Theoren Fleury, the Soviet Union's Evgeny Davydov came off the bench, eventually leading to both benches clearing. The officials walked off the ice and tried shutting off the arena lights, but the brawl lasted for 20 minutes until the International Ice Hockey Federation declared the game null and void. Both teams were ejected from the tournament, and the Soviet team were barred from attending the end-of-tournament dinner.
- October 17, 1989 – Right before Game 3 of the 1989 World Series between the San Francisco Giants and the Oakland Athletics, the Loma Prieta earthquake occurred.
- February 18, 2001 – during the final lap of the 2001 Daytona 500, seven-time champion and fan favorite Dale Earnhardt was involved in a crash that resulted in his death.
- February 1, 2004 – During a performance by singers Justin Timberlake and Janet Jackson at the Super Bowl XXXVIII half time show, Timberlake pulled off a part of Jackson's leather corset, revealing her right breast covered by a piece of jewelry attached to her nipple. He later described the incident as a "wardrobe malfunction". The incident caused outrage among religious groups and demands for the FCC to crack down on in decency on television and radio. It resulted in broadcast television networks imposing a seven-second delay on all future live programming.
- April 21, 2004 – After commenting on a UEFA Champions League match on ITV1, Ron Atkinson thought that the broadcast had finished. However, although transmission in the UK had finished, he was still on air to various countries in the Middle East and proceeded to say that "... he is what is known in some schools as a fucking lazy thick nigger" towards Marcel Desailly. He resigned with immediate effect.
- August 20, 2006 – During a live dance performance of "Crazy Love Song" by the female pop trio SeeYa on the Korean television program SBS Inkigayo, a backup dancer who suffered from epilepsy had a seizure in the middle of the song. The performers ignored the interruption and completed the performance normally before and after the dancer was carried off the stage.
- April 14, 2007 – At the conclusion of an AFL match between Fremantle and West Coast on Network 10, Eagles player Michael Braun concluded his Ross Glenndenning Medal acceptance speech with "Let's have a fucking good year" in front of a TV audience of 550,000 and a crowd of 42,051. Braun was fined $5,500 (equivalent to $8,540 in 2025) by the AFL for the incident.
- February 1, 2015 – NBC aired a rare Sunday Super Bowl edition of The Tonight Show Starring Jimmy Fallon live from the Orpheum Theater in Phoenix, Arizona. This marked the first time since 1971 that The Tonight Show had aired a live episode.
- December 20, 2015 – Miss Universe host Steve Harvey crowned Colombia's representative as the wrong winner by mistake then crowned the Philippines' representative as the actual winner on live television.
- January 8, 2016 – The Late Show with Stephen Colbert aired a live episode for the first time in the 23-year history of CBS's late-night franchise.
- July 21, 2016 – Late Night with Seth Meyers aired a live episode for the first time in the 30-year history of NBC's late-night franchise.
- February 5, 2017 – Fox's live broadcast of Super Bowl LI became the first Super Bowl ever to be decided in overtime and drew the largest total audience for any television program in American history, garnering 172 million viewers (more than 50% of the U.S. population). Its half-time show featuring Lady Gaga drew 117.5 million viewers.
- February 26, 2017 – Towards the end of the 89th Academy Awards, the wrong winner for Best Picture was announced on live television before millions of people watching worldwide. A representative for Price Waterhouse Cooper (PwC), while tweeting a picture of Emma Stone, handed the presenter the wrong envelope. This caused a major embarrassment for AMPAS, and two accountants from PwC were banned from participating in future Academy Awards shows over the incident.
- April 15, 2017 – Saturday Night Live airs the first coast to coast live episode in the United States for the first time in the show's 42-year history.
- April 29, 2018 – American Idol became the first reality competition series in the history of American television to air live coast to coast, allowing for real time voting across all American territories.
- March 27, 2022 – During the 94th Academy Awards, Will Smith stormed on stage and slapped Chris Rock during his presentation of an award. Smith returned to his seat and shouted profanities at Rock, who had made a questionable joke about Smith's wife, Jada Pinkett Smith. While the incident was censored by ABC in the United States by cutting out the sound due to the profanity, it aired uncensored elsewhere.
- June 12, 2022 – The Tony Awards airs its first live coast to coast edition in the U.S. in the awards show's history.
- February 8, 2023 – During an NBA match between the Los Angeles Lakers and the Oklahoma City Thunder on TNT, Lakers player LeBron James concluded his all-time NBA leading points scorer record-breaking speech with "Fuck, man".
- February 12, 2023 – Fox's live broadcast of Super Bowl LVII became the most watched television program in American history, garnering an average of 115.1 million viewers. Its half-time show featuring Rihanna drew more than 121 million viewers.

== Live television episodes ==
Although all programs were once live, the use of video tape means that very few television programs in the modern era have ever attempted such a feat. In the U.S., soap operas including As the World Turns and The Edge of Night were broadcast live until 1975.

On rare occasions, a scripted series will do an episode live to attract ratings. In the U.S. and Canada, the episode is occasionally performed twice: once for the east coast which is composed of the Eastern Time Zone and Central Time Zone and again three hours later for the west coast which is composed of the Mountain Time Zone and the Pacific Time Zone unless they have Dish Network or Direct TV who provides the live feed in all states. The most recent scripted series to air all live episodes was Undateable on NBC during its third season, which aired from October 2015 until January 2016.

In the case of soap operas, they usually broadcast live episodes to celebrate a milestone anniversary.

Notable examples of shows that have had a live episode include:

- Gimme a Break! (1985)
- Roc (The entire second season, 1993)
- ER (1997)
- Coronation Street (for its 40th anniversary in 2000, its 50th anniversary in 2010 and ITV's 60th anniversary in 2015)
- The Drew Carey Show (1999, 2000, and 2001)
- One Life to Live (Went live for an entire week of episodes in May 2002)
- The Bill (2003 and 2005)
- The Daily Show (2004, 2008, 2009)
- Blue Heelers (2004)
- Will & Grace (2005 and 2006)
- Air Farce Live (All episodes from October 2007 – December 2008)
- The West Wing (2005) – An episode ("The Debate") was presented as a live debate between presidential candidates.
- Two Pints of Lager and a Packet of Crisps (2008)
- EastEnders (Went live for a single episode celebrating its 25th anniversary in February 2010, an entire week of episodes for its 30th anniversary in February 2015 and its 40th anniversary in February 2025)
- 30 Rock: season five, "Live Show" (2010) and season six, "Live from Studio 6H" (2012)
- Watch What Happens: Live (July 2009 to present)
- WWE Monday Night RAW (January 1993 to present; began airing all live since summer 1999 with exceptions to certain holidays and overseas tours)
- WWE SmackDown (since 1999, occasional live specials; began airing all live effective July 19, 2016 with exceptions to certain holidays and overseas tours)
- Talking Dead (October 2011 to present)
- Emmerdale (For its 40th Anniversary)
- Undateable (went live for an hour long episode, May 5, 2015, and went live again for the entire third season, October 2015-January 2016)
- The Simpsons (For its twenty-seventh season episode "Simprovised" in May 2016)
- The Late Show with Stephen Colbert (aired 2 weeks of live shows during the Republican and Democratic Conventions on July 18–21 and 25–28, 2016)
- Inside No. 9 (Halloween special, October 2018)

Since 2000, there have been a number of special films broadcast live. These include the remakes of Fail Safe (2000) and The Quatermass Experiment (2005). Some recent examples of live episodic TV series include shows such as Melissa and Joey (2010), Whitney (2011) and Undateable (2014).

A live television advertisement was shown for the first time in 40 years to celebrate the arrival of the new Honda Accord in the United Kingdom. It was broadcast on Channel Four on 29 May 2008 at 20:10 during a special episode of Come Dine With Me. The ad featured skydivers forming the letters of the word Honda over Spain.

== Live television specials ==
Many live television specials were telecast during the pre-videotape era. Among the most successful were the 1955 and 1956 telecasts of Peter Pan, a 1954 musical adaptation of J. M. Barrie's 1904 play, starring Mary Martin, and Cyril Ritchard. This was such a hit that the show was restaged and rebroadcast (this time on videotape) with the same two stars and most of the rest of the cast in 1960, and rerun several times after that. The Peter Pan telecasts marked the first-ever telecasts of a complete Broadway musical with most of its original cast.

On December 5, 2013, NBC broadcast a live television special called The Sound of Music Live! starring Carrie Underwood. This program aired live in the Eastern and Central time zones, and was the first television musical special to air live on NBC in almost fifty years. On January 31, 2016, Fox became the first non-Big Three American network to produce a musical special when it aired the television adaptation of Grease live in the Eastern and Central time zones.

== See also ==
- Event television
- Videotelephony
- Breakfast television
- Effects of time zones on North American broadcasting
