= Ron Weiner =

American television writer

- Occupation: Television writer
- Years active: 1997–2025
- Father: Howard L. Weiner

Ron Weiner (pronounced /ˈwaɪnər/) is an American television writer. He has written for several shows, including 30 Rock, NewsRadio, Futurama, Arrested Development, Father of the Pride, Help Me Help You and Silicon Valley.

Weiner is the son of neurologist Howard L. Weiner. During his job writing for Futurama, Weiner has noted in the audio commentary of Spanish Fry that he tries to get Bender to dance in every episode he writes. He also noted in the commentary for "A Pharaoh to Remember" that he starts off writing his scripts by thinking of a series of dance moves, then building the episode around them.

He has worked as a writer on the NBC comedy series 30 Rock. He was nominated for the Writers Guild of America Award for Best Comedy Series at the February 2009 ceremony for his work on the third season. Later, he contacted producers for his father's screenplay The Last Poker Game, which was released in 2017. His music has been featured in Inside Amy Schumer season 5 episodes.

== Writing credits ==
=== NewsRadio episodes ===
- "Flowers for Matthew"
- "Assistant"
- "Padded Suit"

=== Futurama episodes ===
- "The Luck of the Fryrish"
- "A Pharaoh to Remember"
- "Less Than Hero"
- "Spanish Fry"

=== Arrested Development episodes ===
- "Notapusy"
- "Family Ties"

=== 30 Rock episodes ===
- "Secrets and Lies"
- "Señor Macho Solo"
- "Goodbye, My Friend"
- "The Problem Solvers"
- "Brooklyn Without Limits"
- ""Mamma Mia""
- "Verna"
- "TGS Hates Women"
- "Today You Are a Man"
- "Meet the Woggels!"
- "Respawn" (co-written with Hannibal Buress)
