= Beth McCarthy-Miller =

American television director

- Born: September 3, 1963 (age 62); Elizabeth, New Jersey, U.S.
- Education: University of Maryland
- Occupation: Television director
- Known for: Saturday Night Live

Beth McCarthy-Miller (born September 3, 1963) is an American television director. Shows she has directed include Saturday Night Live and 30 Rock.

== Early and personal life ==
McCarthy-Miller was born on September 3, 1963, in Elizabeth, New Jersey. She has four older brothers and four older sisters. She was raised in Cranford, New Jersey. She attended the University of Maryland, where she was a DJ and majored in radio, television and film. While in college she interned at CNN and MTV.

She is married to a high school teacher, with whom she has a son born around 2005.

== Career ==
McCarthy-Miller worked as a line producer's assistant and assistant director at MTV and began directing in 1988. During her nine years with MTV, she worked on MTV Unplugged with Nirvana, Neil Young, Elton John, Tony Bennett, and k.d. lang. She worked for The Week in Rock and later The Jon Stewart Show.

She was the director of NBC's Saturday Night Live for eleven years. She left SNL in 2006 at the end of season 31, replaced as director by Don Roy King. She became a director for Viacom's MTV again in 2003 when she directed the MTV Video Music Awards.

She currently works through her own companies, Catalyst Entertainment and McBeth Productions as a director and producer.

== Director filmography ==
Year	Title	Notes	Ref
1995–2006	Saturday Night Live	218 Episodes	
1996–1999, 2001–2003	MTV Video Music Awards	1996, 1997, 1998, 1999, 2001, 2002, 2003	
2001	Super Bowl XXXV halftime show		
2001	Taina	1 Episode	
2004	Super Bowl XXXVIII halftime show	Super Bowl XXXVIII halftime show controversy	
2007–2013	30 Rock	24 Episodes	
2008–2011	Kids Choice Awards	2008, 2009, 2010, 2011	
2008–2009	Samantha Who?	2 Episodes	
2009, 2014–2015	Parks and Recreation	3 Episodes	
2011	Californication	1 Episode	
2011	Mr. Sunshine	2 Episodes	
2011–2020	Modern Family	23 episodes	
2012	Happy Endings	1 Episode	
2012	House of Lies	1 Episode	
2012	Up All Night	2 Episodes	
2012–2013	Work It	2 Episodes	
2013–2021	Brooklyn Nine-Nine	6 Episodes	
2013	Community	1 Episode	
2013–2014	The Mindy Project	3 Episodes	
2014	Trophy Wife	1 Episode	
2015–2019	Unbreakable Kimmy Schmidt	5 Episodes	
2016–2017	Black-ish	2 Episodes	
2016–2019	The Good Place	6 Episodes	
2016	The Goldbergs	1 Episode	
2016	Superstore	1 Episode	
2017–2018	Great News	8 Episodes	
2017, 2019	Veep	3 Episodes	
2018	Life in Pieces	1 Episode	
2018–2021	The Kominsky Method	7 Episodes	
2019	Abby's	1 Episode	
2019–2024	Bob Hearts Abishola	80 Episodes	
2019–2022	Young Sheldon	3 Episodes	
2021	Call Me Kat	1 Episode	
2022	Reboot	1 Episode	
2024	The Roast of Tom Brady	Aired live on Netflix	

== Awards and nominations ==
Award	Year	Nominated work	Category	Result	Ref.
Primetime Emmy Awards	1999	Saturday Night Live	Outstanding Directing for a Variety or Music Program	Nominated	
Primetime Emmy Awards	2000	Saturday Night Live	Outstanding Directing for a Variety or Music Program	Nominated	
Primetime Emmy Awards	2002	America: A Tribute to Heroes	Outstanding Directing for a Variety or Music Program	Nominated	
Primetime Emmy Awards	2003	Saturday Night Live	Outstanding Directing for a Variety or Music Program	Nominated	
Primetime Emmy Awards	2006	Saturday Night Live	Outstanding Directing for a Variety or Music Program	Nominated	
Primetime Emmy Awards	2009	30 Rock	Outstanding Directing for a Comedy Series	Nominated	
Primetime Emmy Awards	2011	30 Rock	Outstanding Directing for a Comedy Series	Nominated	
Primetime Emmy Awards	2013	30 Rock	Outstanding Directing for a Comedy Series	Nominated	
Primetime Emmy Awards	2014	The Sound of Music Live!	Outstanding Directing for a Variety Special	Nominated	
Primetime Emmy Awards	2016	Adele Live in New York City	Outstanding Directing for a Variety Special	Nominated	
Primetime Emmy Awards	2020	The Kominsky Method	Outstanding Comedy Series	Nominated	
