= 30 Rock season 1 =

Season of television series

30 Rock
- Season 1
- DVD cover
- Starring: Tina Fey; Tracy Morgan; Jane Krakowski; Jack McBrayer; Scott Adsit; Judah Friedlander; Alec Baldwin
- No. of episodes: 21

Release
- Original network: NBC
- Original release: October 11, 2006 – April 26, 2007

Season chronology
- Next → Season 2

The first season of the television comedy series 30 Rock originally aired between October 11, 2006, and April 26, 2007, on NBC in the United States. The season was produced by Broadway Video, Little Stranger and NBC Universal, and the executive producers were series creator Tina Fey, Lorne Michaels, JoAnn Alfano, Marci Klein, and David Miner.

The series focuses on TGS with Tracy Jordan, a fictional sketch comedy series, and its head writer Liz Lemon, portrayed by Fey, as she juggles her job and her personal life. The season consisted of 21 episodes; 19 episodes were approximately 22 minutes long, and the other two episodes were approximately 26 minutes long due to NBC "supersizing" those episodes. The season moved timeslots three times during its run. The first four episodes aired on Wednesdays at 8:00 pm, the next thirteen episodes aired on Thursdays at 9:30 pm, and the final four episodes aired on Thursdays at 9:00 pm.

The season received generally favorable reviews, and was nominated for ten Emmy Awards: six Primetime Emmy Awards and four Creative Arts Emmy Awards. Despite critical success, the series struggled in the ratings, and the first season averaged 5.8 million viewers for all 21 episodes. The 30 Rock first season DVD box set was released on September 4, 2007, in Region 1 format, and was released on March 17, 2008, in Region 2 format.

== Synopsis ==
The season begins with the introduction of Liz Lemon, the head writer of The Girlie Show, a live sketch comedy series which airs on NBC. When The Girlie Show's network executive Gary dies, Jack Donaghy replaces him. Jack, the head of east coast television and microwave oven programming, makes many changes to The Girlie Show, including adding Tracy Jordan (Tracy Morgan), a loose cannon movie star, to the show's cast and changing the title of The Girlie Show to TGS with Tracy Jordan. Various story arcs are explored, including the rivalry between Tracy and Jenna Maroney (Jane Krakowski), Liz's relationships with Dennis Duffy (Dean Winters) and Floyd Debarber (Jason Sudeikis) and Jack's relationship with Phoebe (Emily Mortimer). Most importantly, the relationship between Jack and Liz develops as he offers to be her mentor, which becomes the anchor of the show. A few minor story arcs are carried over into season two, including Cerie Xerox's (Katrina Bowden) ongoing engagement to the unseen character Aris and Pete Hornberger (Scott Adsit) living with Liz to deal with his marital problems with his wife, Paula Hornberger (later seen in "Greenzo" played by Paula Pell).

== Cast ==
=== Main cast ===
- Tina Fey as Liz Lemon, the head writer of TGS, a live sketch comedy television show.
- Tracy Morgan as Tracy Jordan, a loose cannon movie star and cast member of TGS.
- Jane Krakowski as Jenna Maroney, a vain, fame-obsessed TGS cast member and Liz's best friend.
- Jack McBrayer as Kenneth Parcell, a naïve, television-loving NBC page from Georgia.
- Scott Adsit as Pete Hornberger, the witty and wise producer of TGS.
- Judah Friedlander as Frank Rossitano, an immature staff writer for TGS.
- Alec Baldwin as Jack Donaghy, a high-flying NBC network executive who becomes a mentor to Liz.

=== Recurring cast ===
- Katrina Bowden as Cerie Xerox, the young, attractive TGS general assistant.
- Keith Powell as James "Toofer" Spurlock, a proud African-American staff writer for TGS. (15 episodes)
- Lonny Ross as Josh Girard, a young, unintelligent TGS cast member. (15 episodes)
- Maulik Pancholy as Jonathan, Jack's assistant who is obsessed with him. (14 episodes)
- Kevin Brown as Walter "Dot Com" Slattery, a member of Tracy's entourage. (11 episodes)
- Grizz Chapman as Warren "Grizz" Griswold, a member of Tracy's entourage. (11 episodes)
- Rachel Dratch as various characters (11 episodes)
- John Lutz as J.D. Lutz, a lazy, overweight TGS writer who is often ridiculed by his co-workers. (8 episodes)
- Jason Sudeikis as Floyd DeBarber, an attorney working for GE and love interest for Liz.
- Chris Parnell as Dr. Leo Spaceman, a physician who practices questionable medical techniques. (5 episodes)
- Emily Mortimer as Phoebe, a British art dealer and gold digger who Jack falls for.
- Dean Winters as Dennis Duffy, Liz's immature ex-boyfriend. (3 episodes)
- Ghostface Killah as himself (2 episodes)
- Isabella Rossellini as Bianca Donaghy, Jack's ex-wife
- Rip Torn as Don Geiss, CEO of GE and Jack's boss and mentor.

=== Guest stars ===
- Will Arnett as Devon Banks, NBC's Vice President of West Coast News, Web Content and Theme Park Talent Relations, and Jack's nemesis. (Episode: "Fireworks")
- Joy Behar as herself (Episode: "Up All Night")
- Wayne Brady as Steven Black
- Tucker Carlson as himself
- Anna Chlumsky as Liz Lemler, an accountant for TGS and Floyd's girlfriend. (Episode: "The Fighting Irish")
- Siobhan Fallon Hogan as Patricia Donaghy, Jack's sister. (Episode: "The Fighting Irish")
- Will Forte as Tomas, a servant of Prince Gerhardt. (Episode: "Black Tie")
- Whoopi Goldberg as herself (Episode: "The Rural Juror")
- Donald Glover as young P.A. (Episode: "Jack-Tor")
- Sean Hayes as Jesse Parcell, Kenneth's hillbilly cousin. (Episode: "Hiatus")
- LL Cool J as Ridikolus, a famous hip-hop producer
- Nathan Lane as Eddie Donaghy, Jack's con-man brother.
- Chris Matthews as himself
- Stephanie March as Gretchen Thomas, a lesbian and friend of Jack's who he sets up on a date with Liz. (Episode: "Blind Date")
- John McEnroe as himself (Episode: "The Head and the Hair")
- Conan O'Brien as himself (Episode: "Tracy Does Conan")
- Maury Povich as himself (Episode: "Fireworks")
- Aubrey Plaza as an NBC page. (Episode: "Tracy Does Conan")
- Al Roker as himself (Episode: "Fireworks")
- Paul Reubens as Prince Gerhardt, the last surviving member of the Habsburg dynasty. (Episode: "Black Tie")
- Molly Shannon as Katherine Catherine Donaghy, Jack's sister. (Episode: "The Fighting Irish")
- Sherri Shepherd as Angie Jordan, Tracy's no-nonsense wife. (Episode: "Up All Night")
- Elaine Stritch as Colleen Donaghy, Jack's cold and overbearing mother. (Episode: "Hiatus")

== Episodes ==
No. overall	No. in season	Title	Directed by	Written by	Original release date	Prod. code	U.S. viewers (millions)
1	1	"Pilot"	Adam Bernstein	Tina Fey	October 11, 2006	101	8.13
Liz Lemon, the head writer for a female-based Saturday Night Live-style sketch series called The Girlie Show, butts heads with her new boss, Jack Donaghy, when he suggests that the show hire Tracy Jordan, a black, B-list comedy actor who has become a tabloid trainwreck thanks to his erratic behavior, to be a cast member.
2	2	"The Aftermath"	Adam Bernstein	Tina Fey	October 18, 2006	102	5.71
Continuing from the pilot episode, Jack makes major changes to Liz's sketch show and angers the show's star, Jenna Maroney. An indignant Liz struggles to keep everyone happy, but Tracy saves the day by hosting a party for the entire cast and crew on a private yacht...until a scared maid (Rachel Dratch) reveals a horrible secret about the yacht.
3	3	"Blind Date"	Adam Bernstein	John Riggi	October 25, 2006	103	6.01
Realizing that her near lack of a social life is having an adverse effect on her work, Jack sets Liz up on a blind date with a friend of his. Meanwhile, Jack infiltrates the writers' weekly poker game and starts winning hands until Kenneth the Page joins in and proves to be a surprisingly adept player.
4	4	"Jack the Writer"	Gail Mancuso	Robert Carlock	November 1, 2006	104	4.61
Jack decides to join Liz and her staff in the writers' room, but his lack of writing ability becomes all too evident and his presence ends up stifling the others' creativity. Meanwhile, Tracy mentors Kenneth on how to be successful and Liz encourages Cerie, her young assistant, to dress more conservatively.
5	5	"Jack-Tor"	Don Scardino	Robert Carlock	November 16, 2006	107	5.19
Forced by Jack to plug General Electric products on TGS, Liz integrates Jack himself into a self-referential sketch about product placement, despite the fact that Jack is not a good actor. Meanwhile, Frank and Toofer trick Jenna into thinking that her job is in danger and Liz wonders if Tracy might be illiterate when he refuses to read the cue cards.
6	6	"Jack Meets Dennis"	Juan J. Campanella	Jack Burditt	November 30, 2006	105	5.97
When Liz takes back her sleazy ex-boyfriend Dennis Duffy, Jack takes it upon himself to convince her that she is headed for a life of mediocrity if she doesn't change her ways. Meanwhile, Tracy ramps up his crazy antics after a tabloid catches him walking out of a Starbucks with a dog and publishes a story on how normal Tracy Jordan has become (when really, he was moonwalking backwards into a Starbucks with a dog he recently stole), Jenna gets unorthodox beauty treatments after Jack grills her about her age, and Josh gets a surprise visit from Elizabeth Taylor (Rachel Dratch).
7	7	"Tracy Does Conan"	Adam Bernstein	Tina Fey	December 7, 2006	108	6.84
Jack bumps Jenna's scheduled appearance on Late Night with Conan O'Brien and puts Tracy (who was on Late Night with Conan O'Brien before and tried to stab Conan in the face) on in her place, and things get worse when Liz (who just donated blood and hasn't had anything to eat), Pete, Grizz, and Dotcom discover that Tracy's new medication from Dr. Spaceman (Chris Parnell) causes Tracy to act weirder than usual. Meanwhile Jack encourages Pete Hornberger to wear a wig.
8	8	"The Break-Up"	Scott Ellis	Dave Finkel & Brett Baer	December 14, 2006	109	5.94
Liz finally dumps Dennis and prowls the singles scene, where she proves to be particularly inept at picking up guys under Jenna's tutelage. Meanwhile, Tracy and Toofer's latest fight leads to a racial slur and an afternoon in HR-sanctioned sensitivity training, and Jack dates a certain "high-ranking African-American member of the Bush Administration."
9	9	"The Baby Show"	Michael Engler	Jack Burditt	January 4, 2007	110	5.89
Cerie gets engaged so that she can be a "young hot mom", causing Liz to think about marriage and having a family. Meanwhile, Jack has trouble dealing with his own domineering mother, who wants to move in with him, and Josh uses his ability to do impressions to trick Tracy and Jack.
10	10	"The Rural Juror"	Beth McCarthy	Matt Hubbard	January 11, 2007	111	6.01
Liz and Jenna's friendship gets strained when Liz finally sees Jenna's new legal thriller film The Rural Juror (which most of the characters mispronounce or misname) and tries to sugarcoat the truth about it. Meanwhile, to get himself out of debt, Tracy places his name on a "meat machine" that eliminates the "bread" part of sandwiches.
11	11	"The Head and the Hair"	Gail Mancuso	Tina Fey & John Riggi	January 18, 2007	112	5.04
Two guys, one a cerebral nerd and the other a gorgeous hunk, capture the attention of Liz and Jenna. Meanwhile, Jack and Kenneth trade places for "Bottom's Up Day" and Tracy enlists Frank and Toofer to write his autobiography in one day.
12	12	"Black Tie"	Don Scardino	Kay Cannon & Tina Fey	February 1, 2007	113	5.71
Liz attends a foreign prince's (Paul Reubens) birthday party with Jack and meets his ex-wife. Meanwhile, Tracy tries to convince Pete to cheat on his wife at a wild party while Kenneth talks him out of it.
13	13	"Up All Night"	Michael Engler	Tina Fey	February 8, 2007	114	5.17
The writers struggle to pull an all-nighter on Valentine's Day: Liz receives flowers from a secret admirer, Jack completes his divorce after years of legal separation, Tracy tries to spend the evening with his wife, Pete forgets the holiday, and Kenneth is encouraged to pursue Cerie.
14	14	"The C Word"	Adam Bernstein	Tina Fey	February 15, 2007	106	5.01
After being criticized for her working habits by her co-workers and being called the worst thing a woman can be called, Liz decides to be more lenient with her staff and work overtime herself. Meanwhile, Jack brings Tracy to a major golf event to get closer to Don Geiss, the CEO of GE, but his plan backfires when Tracy decides to drop "truth bombs".
15	15	"Hard Ball"	Don Scardino	Matt Hubbard	February 22, 2007	115	4.61
When Josh's contract comes up for negotiation, Jack tries to save money by not renewing it while Liz tries to prevent Josh from joining the cast of a rival show. Meanwhile, Tracy allows Kenneth into his entourage and Jenna tries to repair her damaged image after she's branded as homophobic and against the troops from a misquote during a magazine shoot.
16	16	"The Source Awards"	Don Scardino	Robert Carlock & Daisy Gardner	March 1, 2007	116	5.74
Jack enlists the rap producer "Ridiculous" (L.L. Cool J) to unload his line of inferior champagne while Tracy reluctantly hosts the Source Awards. Meanwhile, Liz tries to sever ties with a black man she dislikes without coming off as a racist.
17	17	"The Fighting Irish"	Dennie Gordon	Jack Burditt	March 8, 2007	117	5.15
Jack's long-lost brother Eddie (Nathan Lane) shows up and announces their father's death. Meanwhile, Liz, forced to make staff cutbacks, fires her romantic rival "Other Liz" while Tracy seeks spiritual fulfillment at his lawyer's suggestion.
18	18	"Fireworks"	Beth McCarthy	Dave Finkel & Brett Baer	April 5, 2007	118	5.37
Threatened by a sneaky West Coast NBC executive, Jack enlists Kenneth to help thwart any attempts to usurp Donaghy's TV throne. Meanwhile, Tracy discovers that he is a direct descendant of Thomas Jefferson, Twofer discovers a disturbing secret about his Civil War ancestor, and Liz fakes being an alcoholic to get closer to her crush, Floyd.
19	19	"Corporate Crush"	Don Scardino	John Riggi	April 12, 2007	119	5.07
Liz has found happiness with Floyd while Jack pursues a relationship of his own with Phoebe, an eccentric Christie's auctioneer. Tracy vies for Don Geiss's attention, hoping to turn his Jefferson movie idea into a reality.
20	20	"Cleveland"	Paul Feig	Jack Burditt & Robert Carlock	April 19, 2007	120	5.16
Sick of New York and frustrated with his career, Floyd contemplates a move to the Midwest and asks Liz if she would consider leaving TGS behind. Tracy discovers that the "Black Crusaders" are after him and Jack continues to prepare for his marriage to Phoebe.
21	21	"Hiatus"	Don Scardino	Tina Fey	April 26, 2007	121	4.72
As TGS's summer hiatus approaches, Liz deals with the difficulties of her long-distance relationship with Floyd as she tries to find Tracy, who is hiding out in the sticks with Kenneth's uncivilized cousin. Meanwhile, Jack's impending marriage brings his mother, Colleen Donaghy, to town.

== Production ==
=== Development ===
In 2002, Tina Fey was the head writer and cast member on the television show Saturday Night Live (SNL). She pitched the show that became 30 Rock to NBC, originally as a sitcom about cable news. NBC Entertainment president Kevin Reilly felt that "Fey was using the news setting as a fig leaf for her own experience and [he] encouraged her to write what she knew." The show was subsequently reworked to revolve around an SNL-style sketch show. After being presented to Reilly once more, the show was set to air during the 2005–2006 television season.

In May 2003, Fey signed a contract with NBC to remain in her SNL head writer position until at least the 2004–2005 television season and to develop a primetime project to be produced by Broadway Video and NBC Universal. Filming was postponed due to Tina Fey's first pregnancy.

During the 2004–2005 pilot season, a pilot was announced named Untitled Tina Fey Project. The 30 Rock pilot focused on the boss of a variety show who must manage her relationships with the show's volatile star and its charismatic executive producer. The storyline evolved into one that dealt with a head writer of a variety show who dealt with both of the stars, as well as the show's new network executive. 30 Rock was officially given the green light to air May 15, 2006, along with a 13-episode order.

=== Casting ===
Seven actors received star billing during season one. Tina Fey portrayed Liz Lemon, the head writer of a fictitious live sketch comedy television series named TGS with Tracy Jordan (commonly known as TGS). The TGS cast consists of three actors, two of whom are part of the main cast of the first season of 30 Rock. They are the loose cannon movie star Tracy Jordan, portrayed by Tracy Morgan and the dense, limelight-craving Jenna Maroney, portrayed by Jane Krakowski. The role of Jenna was originally given to Rachel Dratch but after the series was retooled away from sketch comedy Dratch was recast. Jack McBrayer played the naïve Southern-born NBC page, Kenneth Parcell. Scott Adsit acted as the witty and wise TGS producer, Pete Hornberger. Judah Friedlander portrayed the wise-cracking, trucker hat wearing, repulsive staff writer Frank Rossitano. Alec Baldwin played the high flying NBC network executive Jack Donaghy who, at the beginning of the season, is employed to retool TGS. Donaghy's full title at the start of the series is "Head of East Coast Television and Microwave Oven Programming."

The season also includes a number of secondary characters including Keith Powell as James "Toofer" Spurlock, a writer for TGS, and Lonny Ross as Josh Girard who is a staff writer of TGS as well as a TGS cast member. Katrina Bowden was TGS's general assistant, Cerie Xerox. These actors were promoted to main cast members in season two. Other recurring roles include Maulik Pancholy as Jonathan, Grizz Chapman as "Grizz" Griswold, Kevin Brown as "Dot Com" Slattery, John Lutz as J.D. Lutz, and Chris Parnell as Dr. Leo Spaceman.

=== Crew ===
The season was produced by Broadway Video, Little Stranger, Inc. and NBCUniversal and aired on NBC in the United States. The executive producers were creator Tina Fey, Lorne Michaels, JoAnn Alfano, Marci Klein and David Miner, with Brett Baer, Dave Finkel, Jack Burditt, and John Riggi acting as co-executive producers. There were eight different directors throughout the season. The staff writers were Tina Fey, John Riggi, Robert Carlock, Jack Burditt, Dave Finkel, Brett Baer, co-producer Matthew Hubbard and Kay Cannon who all wrote, or co-wrote at least two episodes. Daisy Gardner, who co-wrote the episode "The Source Awards" with Robert Carlock, was a guest writer. Those who directed more than one episode were supervising producer Adam Bernstein, Gail Mancuso, Don Scardino, Michael Engler, and Beth McCarthy. There were three directors who only directed one episode each throughout the season; they were Juan J. Campanella, Scott Ellis, and Dennie Gordon. Fey and Carlock acted as the show runners for the season.

== Reception ==
=== Critical reception ===
"Look for 30 Rock to blossom into the next Arrested Development, but let's hope it lasts a little longer than its Fox counterpart."

— Kyle Braun of UGO, comparing the series to the heavily praised Arrested Development.

On Rotten Tomatoes, the season has an approval rating of 84% with an average score of 7.5 out of 10 based on 45 reviews. The website's critical consensus reads, "It isn't as consistently as funny as it could be, considering its pedigree, but 30 Rock is a clever, wacky comedy that benefits from a strong ensemble cast." Metacritic, which uses a weighted average, gave the season a score of 67 out of 100 based on the impression of 31 critical reviews, indicating "generally favorable" reviews. The pilot episode was generally well received; however, Marc D. Allan of The Washington Post said that "viewers who tuned in for the first month or more saw shows that weren't consistently funny", but after a few episodes "the writers discovered the core of the series—the push-pull between Fey's character, Liz Lemon, the harried head writer of The Girlie Show, and Alec Baldwin's domineering network executive, Jack Donaghy—that 30 Rock found its rhythm." Henry Goldblatt of Entertainment Weekly, whilst reviewing the DVD release of the season, called 30 Rock "[the 2006–2007 television season's] finest sitcom". Goldblatt said that the episodes "Hard Ball" and "The Break Up" were "some of the strongest episodes", and awarded the first season an "A" grade.

Christopher Monfette of IGN thought that season one was "well-written and hilariously-performed" and that it was "refreshing to travel through the season and watch these characters grow and evolve". Monfette gave the season a score of 8 out of 10. UGO Entertainment's Kyle Braun said that the season "didn't start out as the funniest new show of 2006", but he praised the seasons progression, proclaiming "now that the show has found its audience, it's hard to argue with the laughs thrown down from high atop 30 Rockefeller Plaza." Anna Johns of TV Squad said that she was "particularly excited for the later two-thirds of the season, when Tina Fey and Tracy Morgan got into their groove and the supporting characters started getting better story lines." After six episodes, NBC picked 30 Rock up for a 21-episode season on December 1, 2006.

=== Ratings ===
The pilot episode garnered 8.13 million viewers, finishing third in its timeslot of 8:00 pm Eastern Standard Time. After three further low rated airings on the following three Wednesdays, including a series low of 4.61 million viewers, NBC decided to move 30 Rock to Thursdays at 9:30 pm. Its first airing on a Thursday night was on November 16, 2006. Along with this change, the even lower rated comedy Twenty Good Years was put on hiatus and later cancelled. 30 Rock's first Thursday airing was viewed by 5.19 million viewers. The series then received ratings of a consistent amount of around 5.5 million viewers till the episode "Hard Ball" when a series low, set by the episode "Jack the Writer," was met with just 4.61 million viewers watching the episode. After a further three episodes, which were higher rated than "Hard Ball," NBC moved 30 Rock to 9:00 pm on Thursdays, serving as a lead-in to Scrubs. Upon its first airing at 9:00 pm, the episode "Fireworks," a "supersized" episode attracted the attention of 5.37 million viewers. 30 Rock aired at 9:00 pm for four episodes. The season finale, "Hiatus," was watched by 4.72 million people. The first season averaged 5.8 million viewers for all 21 episodes. Out of all regular primetime programming that aired during the 2006–2007 American television season, 30 Rock ranked No. 102 out of 142 according to the Nielsen ratings system.

=== Awards ===
The season was nominated for 5 Primetime Emmy Awards winning Outstanding Comedy Series.
