= The Source Awards (30 Rock) =

- 30 Rock episode
- Episode no.: Season 1 Episode 16
- Directed by: Don Scardino
- Written by: Robert Carlock; Daisy Gardner
- Production code: 116
- Original air date: March 1, 2007

Episode chronology
← Previous "Hard Ball"	Next → "The Fighting Irish"
- 30 Rock season 1

"The Source Awards" is the sixteenth episode of the first season of the American television comedy series 30 Rock. It was written by Robert Carlock and Daisy Gardner, and directed by one of the season's supervising producers, Don Scardino. The episode originally aired on NBC in the United States on March 1, 2007. "The Source Awards" featured appearances by Wayne Brady, Kevin Brown, Grizz Chapman, Ghostface Killah, LL Cool J, and Jason Sudeikis.

In the episode, Jack Donaghy (Alec Baldwin) enlists a rap producer, Ridikolous, to unload his line of inferior champagne while Tracy Jordan (Tracy Morgan) reluctantly hosts the Source Awards. At the same time, Liz Lemon (Tina Fey) tries to sever ties with a black man she dislikes without looking racist.

== Plot ==
Liz has a date with Steven Black (Wayne Brady), Tracy's new business manager, whom she met in one of Tracy's after-parties. Many people around Liz make an issue of Steven being African American, but Liz does not care about his race. On her date with Steven, Liz is surprised to find out he is a staunch conservative, and does not have a good time. Steven believes that Liz doesn't like him because he is black, when really she does not like him as a person. She does not want to be thought of as racist, so she continues on the date. Later, Liz tries to break up with Steven and explain to him that she just does not like him as a person, not because of his race. To prove they are incompatible, she brings him as a guest to the Source Awards the following night.

Jack, meanwhile, is producing his own wine, called Donaghy Estate Sparkling Wine. He and Liz taste it, and realize that it is practically undrinkable. This leaves Jack with the problem of disposing with the wine. He decides to market it to hip-hop producer Ridikolous (LL Cool J), and at the same time patch up things between Tracy and Ridikolous, who was not allowed into one of Tracy's parties. Jack and Ridikolous have a meeting, resulting in the wine becoming the corporate sponsor of the Source Awards, which is being produced by Ridikolous. To further mend things with Tracy, Jack proposes to let Tracy host the award show. This backfires when Tracy refuses to host it in fear that he will get shot, but Jack still sees it as the only way to work things out with Ridikolous.

At the Source Awards, Tracy still does not want to host. Jack rhetorically asks him what Oprah would do, but Tracy misunderstands and starts acting like her. Backstage, Tracy shows Liz his gun, which she takes away from him. She fires it by accident and ends up shooting Steven in the buttocks. He thinks she shot him because he was going through her purse and calls her a racist. Following this, Ridikolous comes in and says that Jack has made a mockery of the award, adding: "Wait until I tell Tupac about this!". This leads to a short awkward moment, but Jack insists he did not hear anything.

== Production ==
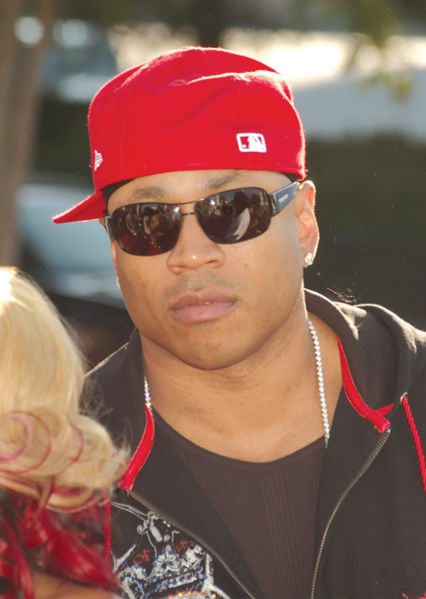
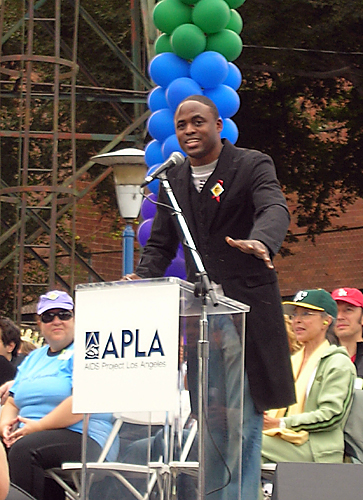
LL Cool J (left) and Wayne Brady (right) guest starred in this episode.

"The Source Awards" was written by executive producer Robert Carlock and Daisy Gardner, and directed by one of the season's supervising producers Don Scardino. This was Carlock's third writing credit, and was Gardner's first written episode. This episode was Scardino's fourth directed episode of 30 Rock.

Rapper Ghostface Killah made his second appearance as himself on the show, having appeared in the episode "Jack-Tor", in which he and Jenna Maroney (Jane Krakowski) perform the song "Muffin Top". In one scene of "The Source Awards", Ghostface Killah is drinking Donaghy Estate Sparkling Wine as a music video is shooting, but cannot stand drinking the wine, which makes him sick. Actor Jason Sudeikis had a brief appearance, in which Liz tells Jenna she ran into him, though not knowing his name yet refers to him as "Flower Guy".

== Reception ==
In its original American broadcast, "The Source Awards" was watched by 5.7 million viewers, according to the Nielsen ratings system. It received a 2.7 rating/7 share among viewers in the 18–49 demographic, meaning that 2.7 percent of all people in that group, and 7 percent of all people from that group watching television at the time, watched the episode. Compared to the previous week, this episode was up 13 percent in the 18–49 demographic and 25 percent in overall viewers. The previous episode, "Hard Ball", was watched by 4.6 million American viewers.

Julia Ward AOL's TV Squad said that while the episode "delivered plenty of funny" it "seemed a bit off-kilter. It had fewer laughs-per-minute than the past few episodes, and structurally, I think the writers couldn't decide which story to foreground." She complimented the series for having "an interesting take" on the hip-hop satire that was featured in "The Source Awards". "From where I sit, it's got to be in the top five, if not three", said TV Guide's Matt Mitovich in regards to this episode. Mitovich noted, "...I can only bow with great reverence to the effort that goes into 30 Rock, where in an episode like this week's, every other line is funny and/or fantastically absurd." IGN contributor Robert Canning opined than an episode like this one, with its guest stars and taking on the issue of race, got "some decent laughs", though it "failed to produce a solid half hour." Canning disliked LL Cool J's guest spot, observing that it was "nothing more than a generic caricature put in the role of a sub-par straight man", but enjoyed Wayne Brady's, as he was "a successful part of the episode's best storyline." Canning said that Tracy as Oprah was "more weird than funny, unfortunately", but liked that Jason Sudeikis made a brief appearance as "Flower Guy" in the episode. In conclusion, Canning gave the episode a 7.5 out of 10 rating. Mekeisha Madden Toby for The Detroit News found the episode a "side-splitter".
