= Corporate Crush =

- 30 Rock episode
- Episode no.: Season 1 Episode 19
- Directed by: Don Scardino
- Written by: John Riggi
- Cinematography by: Vanja Černjul
- Production code: 119
- Original air date: April 12, 2007

Guest appearances
- Kevin Brown as Dot Com Slattery; Grizz Chapman as Grizz Griswold; John Lutz as J.D. Lutz; Emily Mortimer as Phoebe; Maulik Pancholy as Jonathan; Jason Sudeikis as Floyd DeBarber; Rip Torn as Don Geiss

Episode chronology
← Previous "Fireworks"	Next → "Cleveland"
- 30 Rock season 1

"Corporate Crush" is the nineteenth episode of the first season of the American television series 30 Rock. It was written by co-executive producer John Riggi and directed by Don Scardino. The episode originally aired on NBC in the United States on April 12, 2007. Guest stars in this episode include Kevin Brown, Grizz Chapman, John Lutz, Emily Mortimer, Maulik Pancholy, Jason Sudeikis, and Rip Torn.

In this episode, Liz Lemon (Tina Fey), who is now in a happy relationship with Floyd DeBarber (Sudeikis), becomes annoyed when Jack Donaghy (Alec Baldwin) seemingly becomes obsessed with Floyd. Jack begins a relationship with Phoebe (Mortimer), after being demoted. Meanwhile, Tracy Jordan (Tracy Morgan) pitches his movie, Jefferson, to General Electric CEO Don Geiss (Torn).

"Corporate Crush" received generally positive reviews from television critics, with Robert Canning of IGN describing it as "solid". According to the Nielsen ratings system, the episode was watched by 5.1 million households during its original broadcast. Griffin Richardson, the episode's sound mixer, received a Creative Arts Emmy Award nomination in the category for Outstanding Sound Mixing for a Comedy or Drama Series (Half-Hour) and Animation.

== Plot ==
Liz (Tina Fey) has become very happy since dating Floyd (Jason Sudeikis), and their relationship together is going strong. Don Geiss (Rip Torn), the CEO of General Electric, speaks to Jack (Alec Baldwin) about his career, and points out that Jack is the only executive at his level to be unmarried. Owing to the debacle with his fireworks special, Geiss takes away Jack's role as the head of the Microwave Oven division, which makes Jack become extremely depressed. Liz decides that she wants Jack to meet Floyd at dinner, although Jack becomes obsessed with Floyd and becomes a third wheel in Liz and Floyd's relationship. Liz, extremely bothered by Jack's obsession, tells Jack to leave Floyd alone. Jack agrees, and he tells Liz that he has begun a relationship with Phoebe (Emily Mortimer), a Christie's auction house art dealer who has "avian bone syndrome" and on their third meeting still greets Liz with "Hi, I'm Phoebe, I don't know if you remember me ..." Jack asks Liz's approval in his relationship with Phoebe, and when Liz grants it, he immediately proposes to Phoebe.

Meanwhile, Tracy (Tracy Morgan) tries to get Don Geiss to finance his film, Jefferson, which is based on Thomas Jefferson's life. However, Geiss is not interested in Tracy's $35 million project, even after Tracy uses NBC page Kenneth Parcell (Jack McBrayer), Grizz Griswold (Grizz Chapman) and "Dot Com" Slattery (Kevin Brown) to put together a trailer for the film. After failing to convince Geiss, who would rather see him do a sequel to one of Tracy's previous films, Fat Bitch, Tracy decides that he will make Jefferson on his own.

== Production ==
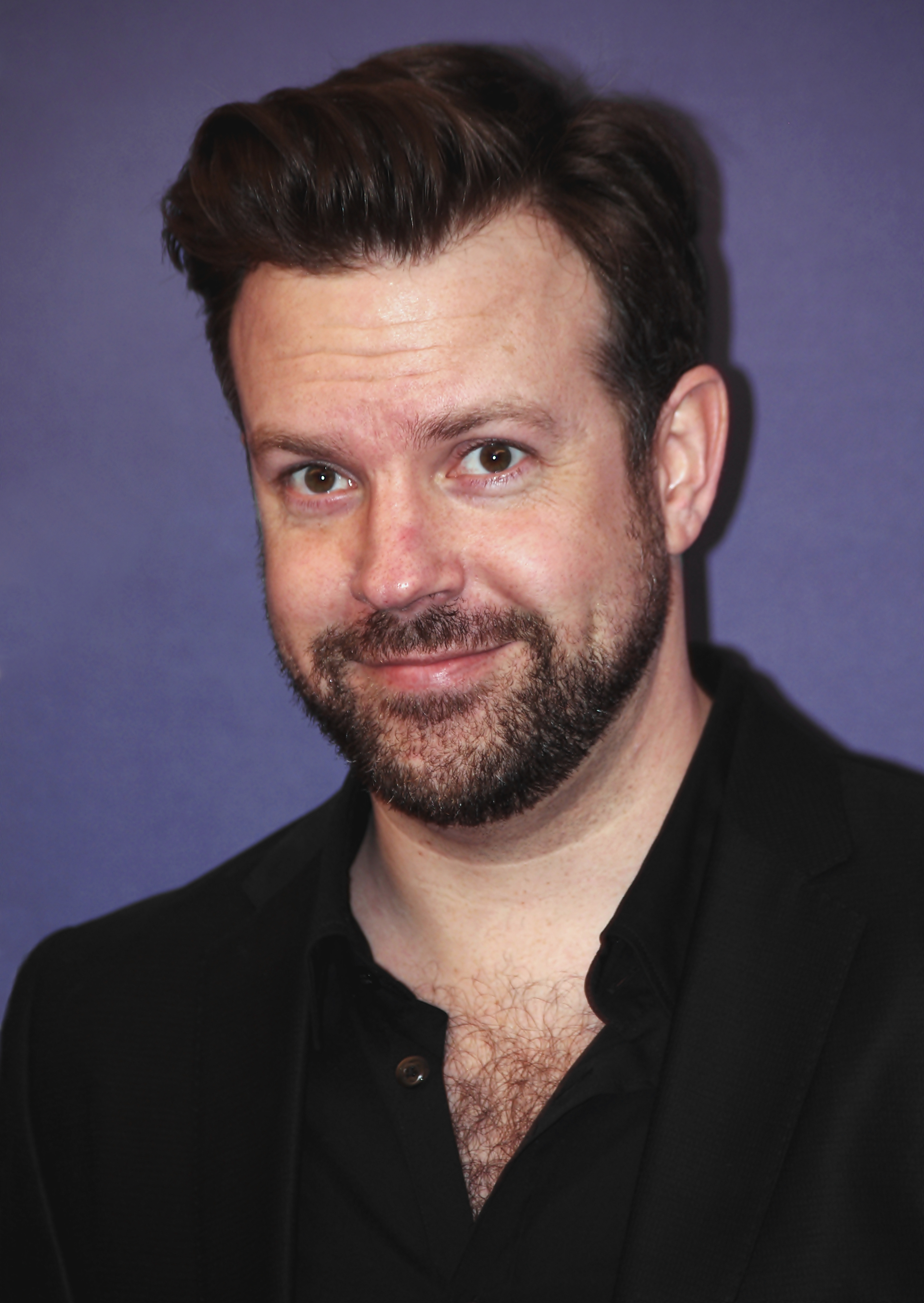
Jason Sudeikis made his fifth appearance on the show in this episode.

"Corporate Crush" was written by co-executive producer John Riggi and directed by Don Scardino. This was Riggi's third writing credit, having written the episodes "Blind Date" and "The Head and the Hair", and was Scardino's fifth directed episode. "Corporate Crush" originally aired on NBC in the United States on April 12, 2007 as the nineteenth episode of the show's first season and overall of the series.

Comedian actor Jason Sudeikis, who played Floyd DeBarber in this episode, has appeared in the main cast of Saturday Night Live, which Fey worked for from 1997 to 2006. This episode was Sudeikis' fifth appearance on 30 Rock. This was actress Emily Mortimer's first appearance as the character Phoebe. She would later guest star in the episodes "Cleveland" and "Hiatus", the latter being her final guest spot. Mortimer told The Philadelphia Inquirer, "It was amazing doing telly. I'd never done a sitcom before and it was so fast. You're given dialogue as you're walking onto the set and it's kind of hairy. There are 10 people standing around watching the monitor and if they don't laugh – then instead of having another chance to do it – someone writes another line." Actor Rip Torn made his second appearance as GE CEO Don Geiss in "Corporate Crush". Torn previously appeared in the February 15, 2007, episode "The C Word".

== Reception ==
In its original American broadcast, "Corporate Crush" was watched by an average of 5.1 million households, according to the Nielsen ratings system. This was a decrease from the previous episode, "Fireworks", which was watched by 5.4 million American viewers. "Corporate Crush" achieved a 2.6/7 in the key 18- to 49-year-old demographic. The 2.6 refers to 2.6% of all people of ages 18–49 years old in the United States, and the 7 refers to 7% of all people of ages 18–49 years old watching television at the time of the broadcast in the United States. Since airing, the episode has received generally positive reviews.

IGN contributor Robert Canning wrote that "Corporate Crush" was a "solid episode", and that 30 Rock seemed "to have hit its storytelling stride". He added that "as we near the season finale, we're happy to see that 30 Rock has begun their drive towards a big finish". Canning rated this episode an 8 out of 10. TV Guide's Matt Webb Mitovich opined that "though the 'My guy friend is dating my boyfriend' gag has been done to death on TV sitcoms, 30 Rock is to be forgiven if only because the same episode gave us a preview of, no, not The Real Wedding Crashers [Groan], but Jefferson, starring ... Tracy Jordan." Julia Ward of TV Squad awarded this episode with 5 out of 7, and said that Jenna Maroney's (Jane Krakowski) absence was upside to the episode, explaining, "I actually like Jane Krakowski, but I can't say that I've missed her". Regarding Jack and Liz's relationship in the episode, Ward thought it was an "uneasy mutual respect thing", which she thought let "Alec Baldwin exercise his thespian prowess". However, Ward said that she did not watch 30 Rock for the continuing storylines, rather, she watched the series for the "wacky".

Griffin Richardson, the series' sound mixer, was nominated for a Creative Arts Primetime Emmy in the category for Outstanding Sound Mixing for a Comedy or Drama Series (half-hour) and Animation. Richardson, however, lost to Steve Morantz of Entourage, and Joe Foglia of Scrubs.
