= Cleveland (30 Rock) =

- 30 Rock episode
- Episode no.: Season 1 Episode 20
- Directed by: Paul Feig
- Written by: Jack Burditt; Robert Carlock
- Cinematography by: Vanja Černjul
- Production code: 120
- Original air date: April 19, 2007

Guest appearances
- Jennifer Bassey as Old Vibrant Lady; Kevin Brown as Dot Com Slattery; Grizz Chapman as Grizz Griswold; Eric Dysart as Alan Garkel; Lester Holt as himself; Traci Hovel as Broker; Emily Mortimer as Phoebe; Maulik Pancholy as Jonathan; Jason Sudeikis as Floyd DeBarber

Episode chronology
← Previous "Corporate Crush"	Next → "Hiatus"
- 30 Rock season 1

"Cleveland" is the twentieth episode of the first season of 30 Rock. It was written by one of the season's co-executive producers, Jack Burditt, and one of the season's executive producers, Robert Carlock. It was directed by Paul Feig. It first aired on April 19, 2007, on the NBC network in the United States. Guest stars in this episode included Jennifer Bassey, Kevin Brown, Grizz Chapman, Lester Holt, Traci Hovel, Emily Mortimer, Maulik Pancholy, and Jason Sudeikis.

In this episode, Liz Lemon (played by Tina Fey) and Floyd (Jason Sudeikis) visit Cleveland, Ohio when Floyd says he wishes that he could live there. Tracy Jordan (Tracy Morgan) goes on the run from The Black Crusaders. Liz discovers that Jack Donaghy's (Alec Baldwin) fiancée, Phoebe (Emily Mortimer), is keeping some deceiving secrets.

== Plot ==
When Floyd (Jason Sudeikis) loses out on a possible job promotion to Alan Garkel (Eric Dysart)—an African-American candidate in a wheelchair—he informs Liz Lemon of his aspirations to move back home to Cleveland. After Floyd asks Liz about her own future in New York, she begins to notice all the problems she has with the city and so they plan a visit to Floyd's hometown.

Meanwhile, Jack returns from a weekend in Paris with Phoebe, his new fiancée, and insists that Liz should get to know Phoebe better. He tells her to take Phoebe and Jenna Maroney (Jane Krakowski) on a girls' day out. As their day progresses Liz senses Phoebe is not who she claims to be. Liz's suspicions are confirmed when she covertly follows Phoebe to a restaurant and spies her holding hands with an older gentleman. This is alarming for two reasons: first, Phoebe is already engaged to Jack, and secondly, she has previously claimed to be afflicted by "Avian Bone Syndrome," a result of which is that her purportedly brittle bones would not be able to stand such intense physical contact. Even though Liz tries to remain inconspicuous at the restaurant, Phoebe notices her. Knowing that Liz is on to her deceptions, Phoebe confronts Liz, who is not interested in Phoebe's excuses and tells her that she has a choice: tell Jack about her cheating or Liz will do so herself. Phoebe becomes angry and then shocks Liz when she drops her British accent. Liz tries to tell Jack about her suspicions, but he is immediately offended by her seemingly unfounded and slanderous comments about his fiancée, which puts a heavy strain on their working relationship.

Finally, Tracy has somehow become entangled in a character assassination plot. When Frank Rossitano (Judah Friedlander) tells Tracy that he read in a magazine that Bill Cosby hates him, Tracy realizes that The Black Crusaders, a cabal of powerful African Americans (a reference to the 2006 conspiracy theory hoax regarding a similar group called the Dark Crusaders driving Dave Chappelle off his Comedy Central show), are out to destroy his career. The Black Crusaders have managed to put a stop to all productions featuring Tracy. Fearing for his life, Tracy goes on the run to Cleveland and, from there, into Needmore, Pennsylvania.

== Production ==
This episode was the fourth episode written by Jack Burditt and also the fourth episode written by Robert Carlock. It was the first episode directed by Paul Feig. The scenes set in Cleveland, Ohio were actually filmed in Battery Park City, Manhattan. Similarly, the scenes in the town of Needmore, Pennsylvania in the following episode, "Hiatus", were filmed in Douglaston, Queens. Jason Sudeikis and Tina Fey sing the montage when touring Cleveland.

== Reception ==
"Cleveland" brought in an average of 5.2 million viewers upon its original broadcast in the United States. It also achieved a 2.5/7 in the key 18- to 49-year-old demographic. The 2.5 refers to 2.5% of all people of ages 18–49 years old in the U.S., and the 7 refers to 7% of all people of ages 18–49 years old watching television at the time of the broadcast in the U.S..

Robert Canning of IGN thought that this episode "was by far the funniest, laugh-out-loud, near genius episode of 30 Rock this season." He wrote that "there wasn't a moment wasted in the entire half hour, which not only gave us plenty of laughs, but it continued the ongoing storylines with fantastic pacing and ease." Canning stated that "the best part of this episode by far was Tracy's paranoia over The Black Crusaders" and he rated the episode 9.7 out of 10. Matt Webb Mitovich of TV Guide wrote regarding Emily Mortimer's guest appearance that "she's not the first thought for most sitcoms looking to fill a vacancy. But here, she's obviously relishing (as Isabella Rossellini did) the chance to go a bit bonkers. When she lapsed out of the accent, what fun." Anna Johns of AOL's TV Squad wrote that she "didn't find 'Cleveland' nearly as funny as the super-sized 'Fireworks' episode two weeks ago, but it was still pretty good. The best sources of humor in this show are Kenneth the Page and Tracy Jordan, neither of which had a very prominent role this week."
