= 30 Rock Original Television Soundtrack =

30 Rock (Original Television Soundtrack)

Soundtrack album by Jeff Richmond
- Released: November 16, 2010
- Genre: Soundtrack
- Length: 1 hour
- Label: Relativity Music Group

30 Rock Original Television Soundtrack is the soundtrack for the NBC television program 30 Rock. The two-disc album consists largely of songs composed by Jeff Richmond, the co-producer and musical director of the show and the husband of the creator, writer, producer, and star, Tina Fey. It includes the score of the series as well as some songs that have been featured in the show's first four seasons. It was released on November 16, 2010 by Relativity Music Group. On November 20, 2010, the cast of 30 Rock did their first ever signing for the soundtrack at the NBC Experience Store at Rockefeller Center. Appearances were made by Tina Fey, Jeff Richmond, Jane Krakowski, Jack McBrayer, John Lutz, Kevin Brown, and Grizz Chapman.

== Track listing ==
Disc One
No.	Title	Artist	Length
1.	"Page Off Intro" / "Theme from 30 Rock" / "Kenneth Chokes"	Jeff Richmond	0:50
2.	"Carol"	Richmond	2:17
3.	"Frenchy" / "Slummin' It" / "Donald"	Richmond	2:35
4.	"Restaurant" / "Snowy Night" / "Light of Day"	Giancarlo Vulcano, Richmond	3:17
5.	"Jack in Four" / "Cha Cha" / "Cleveland" / "Grizz & Liz"	Richmond, Jason Sudeikis, Tina Fey	4:32
6.	"My Funny Valentine"	Richmond	1:18
7.	"Boys in Gayland" / "Halloween" / "Chicken Killer" / "Jack Attack"	Richmond	3:11
8.	"Meet Donny" / "Spanx" / "Dirty 30's" / "Liz Taylor"	Richmond	3:25
9.	"Mr. Templeton" / "Burnt"	Michael Bublé, Richmond	2:12
10.	"Sunset Rounds"	Richmond	2:27
11.	"Lizzie's Blues" / "Sad Clown"	Richmond	2:34
12.	"Claire" / "Handkiss" / "The Getaway"	Richmond	2:40
13.	"Colleen" / "Dumb Moon" / "Headlights"	Richmond	1:48
14.	"Dad" / "Pieces of Wood"	Richmond	2:01
15.	"'Ave Maria' as Played by Kathy Geiss at the Cryogenic Freezing of Her Father" / "Blind Loves"	Richmond	2:52
16.	"Midnight Train to Georgia"	Richmond, Tracy Morgan, Jane Krakowski, Alec Baldwin, Edie Falco, Jack McBrayer, Kevin Brown, Grizz Chapman, Fey	2:15
17.	"30 Rock – Long Play Version" / "The Bitenuker"	Richmond	3:25
Total length:			43:39

Disc Two
No.	Title	Artist	Length
1.	"Make a Pizza"	Richmond, Krakowski	0:27
2.	"That's Her"	Richmond, and Katreese Barnes	0:37
3.	"Muffin Top"	Richmond, Krakowski	1:58
4.	"Werewolf Bar Mitzvah"	Richmond, Morgan, Donald Glover	2:52
5.	"Simple Things"	Richmond, McBrayer, Baldwin	0:16
6.	"Tennis Night"	Richmond, Krakowski	1:03
7.	"Danny Boy"	Richmond, Cheyenne Jackson	0:20
8.	"The Christmas Waltz"	Richmond, Krakowski, Jackson	2:15
9.	"The Christmas Song"	Richmond, Krakowski, Elaine Stritch, Baldwin	2:16
10.	"The America Song and the Mob"	Richmond, Krakowski	1:18
11.	"I Will Always Love You"	Richmond, Morgan, McBrayer	0:52
12.	"All My Nights I've Been Waiting (Liz Lemon's Theme)"	Fey, Christopher Cross	4:24
13.	"Don't Go to Bed with a Frown"	Richmond, Anita Gillette, Jan Hooks, Patti LuPone, Stritch, the 30 Rock Cast	0:26
14.	"What Do You Say to Cleveland"	Richmond	1:08
15.	"Kidnapped by Danger-The Avery Jessup Story (sponsored by Pride Pads: Make the world your toilet.)"	Fey, Amy Poehler, Jane Krakowski, Patti LuPone, the 30 Rock Cast	1:47
Total length:			21:07
