= The Fighting Irish =

- 30 Rock episode
- Episode no.: Season 1 Episode 17
- Directed by: Dennie Gordon
- Written by: Jack Burditt
- Cinematography by: Vanja Černjul
- Production code: 117
- Original air date: March 8, 2007

Guest appearances
- Dan Bakkedahl as Angry Father; Katrina Bowden as Cerie Xerox; Anna Chlumsky as Liz Lemler; Siobhan Fallon Hogan as Patricia Donaghy; Nathan Lane as Eddie Donaghy; Brian Murray as Jimmy Donaghy; Maulik Pancholy as Jonathan; Lonny Ross as Josh Girard; Molly Shannon as Katherine Catherine Donaghy; Jason Sudeikis as Floyd DeBarber

Episode chronology
| ← Previous "The Source Awards" | Next → "Fireworks" |
- 30 Rock season 1

"The Fighting Irish" is the seventeenth episode of NBC's first season of 30 Rock. It was written by one of the season's co-executive producers, Jack Burditt, and it was directed by Dennie Gordon. It aired on March 8, 2007, in the United States. Guest stars who appear in this episode are Dan Bakkedahl, Katrina Bowden, Anna Chlumsky, Siobhan Fallon Hogan, Nathan Lane, Boris McGiver, Brian Murray, Maulik Pancholy, Lonny Ross, Molly Shannon, Jason Sudeikis and Kristen Sudeikis.

The episode features the appearance of Jack Donaghy's (Alec Baldwin) brother, Eddie Donaghy (Nathan Lane), who visits Jack claiming that their father (Brian Murray) is dead. Jack also tells Liz Lemon (Tina Fey) that she has to fire ten percent of her staff. Liz struggles with this task until she meets Floyd's girlfriend, Liz Lemler (Chlumsky), who works in the accounting department at TGS with Tracy Jordan.

== Plot ==
Jack's down-and-out brother, Eddie (Nathan Lane), pays him a visit, claiming that their father is dead. Jack and Eddie, after feuding, later bond and even decide to invite their sisters (former SNL cast members, Molly Shannon and Siobhan Fallon Hogan) and brother-in-law (Boris McGiver) to 30 Rock for an impromptu family reunion. As his family are about to watch a taping of TGS, Jack's supposedly dead father visits Jack in his office, claiming that Eddie is dead. It is soon revealed that Eddie and his father pretended to be dead in conflicting plans to scam the entirety of 30 Rock. This eventually leads the family confronting each other live on the TGS stage and Liz getting knocked out by one of Jack's sisters, further resulting in a brawl.

Meanwhile, Liz has been told by Jack that she has to fire ten percent of her staff. While the staff try their best to keep their jobs, Liz struggles with making a decision of whom to fire. Liz's problem is solved when Floyd, for whom Liz has romantic feelings, tells her that his girlfriend works in accounting at TGS. Liz meets with Floyd's girlfriend to gain leverage, leading her to discover that the other Liz seeks commitment with Floyd. Enraged, Liz promptly fires her then goes on a rampage around 30 Rock firing people, including her producer Pete Hornberger (Scott Adsit), who disagrees with her decision to fire Floyd's girlfriend for her own personal gain along with the entire accounting department who attempt to stick up for their fired colleague. Jack later tells her that he hired all the fired people back, but he is transferring Floyd's girlfriend to General Electric headquarters in Fairfield, Connecticut.

Tracy Jordan (Tracy Morgan) has been told by his lawyer that he should join a religion. He asks advice of people including Liz and Jack, going as far as attending church with Kenneth Parcell (Jack McBrayer). When Eddie explains Irish Catholicism to Tracy, emphasizing the seeming free ride aspect of confession, he decides that this is the religion he was looking for and joins. He changes his mind after learning about the "constant, crushing guilt" from Jack.

== Production ==
Jason Sudeikis, Molly Shannon and Siobhan Fallon Hogan, who play Floyd, Katherine Catherine and Patrica in this episode, have all appeared in the main cast of Saturday Night Live, a weekly sketch comedy series which airs on NBC in the United States.

Kristen Sudeikis, the sister of Jason Sudeikis, appears in this episode as an "advanced hip-hop groove" gym class instructor. Kristen Sudeikis is a professional choreographer.

Judah Friedlander, who portrays Frank Rossitano on the show, is known for his trademark trucker hats which he wears in and out of the Frank character. The hats normally have short words or phrases glued onto them. Friedlander has stated that he makes the hats himself. He has also said that "some are in-jokes, and some are just flat out jokes." The idea came from Friedlander's stand-up persona in which his hats are all printed with "world champion" in different languages in different appearances. In this episode, Frank wears an "extra-flashy 'Liz Rocks' hat" to try to persuade Liz not to fire him.

This episode is the third episode written by Jack Burditt after "Jack Meets Dennis" and "The Baby Show". Also, this is the first episode directed by Dennie Gordon.

== Reception ==
In the U.S., this episode was viewed by 5.2 million viewers and received a rating of 2.5/6 in the key adults 18–49 demographic according to the Nielsen ratings system. The 2.5 refers to 2.5% of all 18- to 49-year-olds, and the 6 refers to 6% of all 18- to 49-year-olds watching television at the time of the broadcast.

Robert Canning of IGN wrote that "while the episode was fun, there just weren't as many of the laugh-out-loud moments that have made recent episode so memorable." Matt Webb Mitovich of TV Guide wrote that "something about this week's episode, in which Liz claimed power, Jack found family and Tracy sought religion (a subplot deserving of far greater screen time), just wasn't clicking for [him]." Julia Ward of AOL's TV Squad thought that "this episode didn't reach the farcical highs of 'Black Tie'. It was more standard sitcom fare than goofy bliss, but it wasn't bad."
