= The Aftermath (30 Rock) =

- 30 Rock episode
- Episode no.: Season 1 Episode 2
- Directed by: Adam Bernstein
- Written by: Tina Fey
- Cinematography by: Tom Houghton
- Production code: 102
- Original air date: October 18, 2006

Guest appearances
- Katrina Bowden as Cerie Xerox; Tom Broecker as Lee; Teddy Coluca as Stage Manager; Rachel Dratch as Maria; Maulik Pancholy as Jonathan; Keith Powell as Toofer Spurlock; Lonny Ross as Josh Girard; Kevin Brown as Dot Com; Grizz Chapman as Grizz; John Lutz as J.D. Lutz

Episode chronology
| ← Previous "Pilot" | Next → "Blind Date" |
- 30 Rock season 1

"The Aftermath" is the second episode of the first season of the American situation comedy television show 30 Rock, which first aired on October 17, 2006 on CTV in Canada. It aired on October 18, 2006 on the NBC network in the United States, its country of origin, and October 18, 2007 in the United Kingdom. The episode was written by Tina Fey and was directed by Adam Bernstein. Guest stars in this episode include Katrina Bowden, Tom Broecker, Teddy Coluca, Rachel Dratch, Adrienne Frost, Maulik Pancholy, Keith Powell, and Lonny Ross.

The episode focuses on the reaction of the crew to the casting of Tracy Jordan (Tracy Morgan), and the subsequent changes made to The Girlie Show. This becomes evident when Jack Donaghy (Alec Baldwin) changes the title of the show to TGS with Tracy Jordan, much to Jenna Maroney's (Jane Krakowski) dismay. Liz Lemon (Tina Fey) struggles to keep the cast and crew happy, so together with Tracy, she throws a party on a yacht.

== Plot ==
Liz becomes furious when Jack decides that Tracy should be the number one priority on The Girlie Show. Jenna fears that Tracy will begin to overshadow her, but Tracy is quite pleased with his new job on the show. Liz and Jenna become more aggravated when Jack decides to change the name of The Girlie Show to TGS with Tracy Jordan, without consulting either of them. Jack has Tracy and Jenna appear in a promotion for the show, in which Tracy angers Jenna by forgetting her name and by not letting her speak. After the promotion, Liz tries to re-assure Jenna by telling her that nobody on the show likes Tracy and that the only reason that he is on the show is because of Jack. Liz is informed by Kenneth Parcell (Jack McBrayer) that Jenna's microphone was still on, and everyone in the studio heard her say terrible things about Jack and Tracy.

Liz attempts to make amends by talking to Tracy during a rehearsal, during which she makes negative remarks about Jenna and the other members of her staff. Liz is again notified by Kenneth that her chat with Tracy was heard by everyone, this time being aired over the studio’s monitors. Liz's staff show their displeasure by throwing food and other objects at her. Liz and Tracy discuss an idea to get everyone together to try and smooth things over, and Tracy decides to invite Liz and the staff to a party aboard his yacht. Tracy gets along well with everyone at the party, including Jenna, and things appear to be going very well. Liz soon discovers that the yacht does not belong to Tracy, and the yacht's real owner shows up with the NYPD. The following day Liz learns that Jack paid the newspapers to keep Tracy out of the press but left a photo of Jenna passing out on the yacht in their pages, which Jenna sees as exciting and flattering.

== Production ==
Rachel Dratch, longtime comedy partner and fellow Saturday Night Live alumna of Fey, was originally cast to portray Jenna. Dratch played the role in the show's original pilot, but in August 2006, Jane Krakowski was announced as Dratch's replacement. Executive producer Lorne Michaels announced that while Dratch would not be playing a series regular, she would appear in various episodes in a different role. In the previous episode, Dratch played Greta Johansen, The Girlie Show's cat wrangler, while in this episode, she played Maria the maid, who was found by Liz in a closet on the yacht.

== Reception ==
According to the Nielsen ratings system, "The Aftermath" was viewed by 5.71 million viewers upon its original broadcast in the United States. It also achieved a 2.3/7 in the key 18–49 demographic, meaning that it was watched by 2.4% of all 18- to 49-year-olds in the U.S., and 5% of all 18- to 49-year-olds watching television at the time of the broadcast. This was 2.42 million viewers less than the pilot. In the United Kingdom, the episode attracted 500,000 viewers and a 4% share of the viewing audience at the time of the broadcast, which was deemed "disappointing" by Media Guardian. This was 200,000 viewers down from the pilot, which attracted 700,000 viewers and a 6% share of the viewing audience at the time of the broadcast.

"While both Morgan and Baldwin's characters are nothing more than crazy, the biggest problem lies with Jenna. She's supposed to be Liz's best friend, but there's nothing about her character that would even suggest that such a friendship would exist – if anything, she seems like the type of person Liz would hate. The situation isn't helped by Krakowski and Fey's absolute lack of chemistry and the genuinely awkward feeling permeating most of their scenes together."

—Phil Horst of The Pitt News on the character of Jenna Maroney.

Robert Canning of IGN felt that the episode was more cohesive than the pilot, but still suffered from "two generic main characters and predictable storytelling". He praised characters Liz and Jack, saying they "continued to provide laughs", but said Jenna and Tracy "only continued to frustrate". Canning called Baldwin the best part of 30 Rock, and found that the series had "laid essential groundwork for a successful situation comedy". Robert Abele of LA Weekly felt that the characters of Morgan and Krakowski were undeveloped, describing them as "self-obsessed, newly thrown-together co-leads".

Tim Goodman of the San Francisco Chronicle felt that "The Aftermath" was only "minorly more funny" than the pilot. He praised Baldwin and Morgan, but said that the rest of the episode was "weak". Goodman felt that Fey could "fix" 30 Rock by showing more of Baldwin, and less of Krakowski. Phil Horst of The Pitt News praised the individual scenes between Fey and either Baldwin or Morgan, but criticized Fey for not writing an effective scene in which she did not appear. Horst saw Jenna's screentime as a waste of time, and thought that Krakowski did not "have the comedic skills to keep up with the rest of the cast". He went on to say that Dratch would have taken the character in "a completely different direction", giving 30 Rock the variety it lacked.
