= Hiatus (30 Rock) =

- 30 Rock episode
- Episode no.: Season 1 Episode 21
- Directed by: Don Scardino
- Written by: Tina Fey
- Cinematography by: Vanja Černjul
- Production code: 121
- Original air date: April 26, 2007

Guest appearances
- Katrina Bowden as Cerie Xerox; Kevin Brown as Dot Com Slattery; Grizz Chapman as Gris Griswold; Matt Dickinson as Jack's Assistant; Rachel Dratch as Dr. Beauvoir; Sean Hayes as Jesse Parcell; Lester Holt as himself; Emily Mortimer as Phoebe; Chris Parnell as Dr. Leo Spaceman; Lonny Ross as Josh Girard; Elaine Stritch as Colleen Donaghy; Jason Sudeikis as Floyd DeBarber

Episode chronology
← Previous "Cleveland"	Next → "SeinfeldVision"
- 30 Rock season 1

"Hiatus" is the twenty-first and season finale episode of NBC's first season of 30 Rock. It was written by series creator and executive producer Tina Fey, and was directed by Don Scardino. It first aired on April 26, 2007, in the United States. Guest stars in the episode included Katrina Bowden, Kevin Brown, Grizz Chapman, Rachel Dratch, Sean Hayes, Emily Mortimer, Chris Parnell, Lonny Ross, Elaine Stritch, and Jason Sudeikis. Lester Holt appeared as himself in this episode.

The episode focuses on the imminent season finale of TGS with Tracy Jordan, a fictional sketch comedy series which airs live on Friday nights. Liz Lemon (played by Tina Fey) is frantic because Tracy Jordan (Tracy Morgan) is still missing and Jack Donaghy's (Alec Baldwin) health threatens his marriage to Phoebe (Emily Mortimer).

== Plot ==
After going on the run from the Black Crusaders, Tracy has traveled to Needmore, Pennsylvania (an actual town located in Belfast Township, Fulton County, Pennsylvania) to stay with Kenneth Parcell's (Jack McBrayer) cousin, Jesse Parcell (Sean Hayes). Liz is stressed as the season finale of TGS with Tracy Jordan is nearing, and Tracy cannot be found. Liz and Jack force Tracy's whereabouts from Kenneth, who they send to bring him back. Tracy realizes that he wants to go back to the city, but Jesse kidnaps him. Kenneth, accompanied by Dot-Com and Grizz, manages to rescue Tracy and get him back in time for the show's finale.

Jack is livid when his mother, Colleen Donaghy (Elaine Stritch), visits him when she is in town to attend his ex-wife Bianca's (Isabella Rossellini) wedding to Vincent Folley. Colleen takes an immediate dislike to Jack's fiancée, Phoebe, but takes a liking to Liz, whom she originally mistakes for Phoebe. The stress of his approaching wedding and the arrival of his mother prompt Jack to have a heart attack. While at the hospital, Colleen uses a heart monitor as a lie detector, on Jack, which leads him to revealing that he does not love Phoebe. They break off their engagement.

Liz and Floyd (Jason Sudeikis) are struggling to maintain a long distance relationship, since Floyd's move to Cleveland. Liz later reveals to Jack that she and Floyd have separated.

== Production ==
The scenes set in Needmore, Pennsylvania were actually filmed in Douglaston, Queens. Similarly, the scenes in Cleveland from the previous episode were filmed in Battery Park City, Manhattan. The character Jesse Parcell taking in Tracy Jordan during his hard times, mirrors the Stephen King novel made movie, Misery (novel), in which an over-obsessed fan of an author takes in the author but ends up forcing them to stay with them, under the guise of "Being their biggest fan".

== Reception ==
"Hiatus" brought in an average of 4.7 million viewers. The episode also achieved a 2.4/6 in the key 18–49-year-old demographic. The 2.4 refers to 2.4% of all people of ages 18–49 years old in the U.S., and the 6 refers to 6% of all people of ages 18–49 years old watching television at the time of the broadcast in the U.S. This episode was watched by 200,000 people upon its original broadcast in the United Kingdom.

Robert Canning of IGN said that this episode left him feeling "a bit cheated." He said that this was because "the storylines we've loved for weeks all failed to come to a satisfying end." He added that "after a string of stellar episodes, it's not surprising 30 Rock eventually faltered." Canning rated this episode with a "6.5 out of 10." Matt Webb Mitovich of TV Guide wrote that he "didn't find this episode quite as manic as the previous few, but that's probably because it had actual story to progress and threads to tie up."

Elaine Stritch's appearance in this episode earned her a Primetime Emmy Award for Outstanding Guest Actress in a Comedy Series. Stritch would later appear as Colleen in the episodes "Ludachristmas," which was part of season two; "Christmas Special" and "The Natural Order" in season three; "The Moms" in season four; "Christmas Attack Zone" in season five; "Meet the Woggels!" in season six; and "My Whole Life Is Thunder" in the show's seventh and final season.
