= Jack the Writer =

- 30 Rock episode
- Episode no.: Season 1 Episode 4
- Directed by: Gail Mancuso
- Written by: Robert Carlock
- Production code: 104
- Original air date: November 1, 2006

Guest appearances
- Katrina Bowden as Cerie Xerox; Keith Powell as Toofer Spurlock; Maulik Pancholy as Jonathan; Tom Broecker as Lee; Jonathan Lutz as J.D. Lutz; James Anderson as James Anderson; Sharon Wilkins as Angie Jordan

Episode chronology
← Previous "Blind Date"	Next → "Jack-Tor"
- 30 Rock season 1

"Jack the Writer" is the fourth episode of the first season of the American situation comedy 30 Rock, which aired on November 1, 2006, on the NBC network in the United States, and on November 1, 2007, in the United Kingdom. The episode was written by Robert Carlock and was directed by Gail Mancuso. Guest stars in this episode include Katrina Bowden, Keith Powell, Maulik Pancholy, Tom Broecker, Jonathan Lutz, James Anderson and Sharon Wilkins.

The episode focuses on the relationship between Liz Lemon (Tina Fey), head writer of TGS with Tracy Jordan, and Jack Donaghy (Alec Baldwin), her boss; and the distractions the writers of TGS face when writing sketches. This becomes evident when Liz's assistant, Cerie (Katrina Bowden), wears sexually suggestive clothing; and when Jack decides to join the writers for observation. Kenneth Parcell (Jack McBrayer) learns that working for Tracy Jordan (Tracy Morgan), the main star of TGS, is more than he expected.

== Plot ==
The staff are preparing to write sketches for TGS with Tracy Jordan when Jack arrives and announces that he went through a program at General Electric (GE) called Six Sigma, which encourages bosses to interact with their staff. He tells Liz and the writers that he will be sitting in the writers' room every day as an observer. As days pass, Jack begins to interfere with the writers' work, and instead of just being an observer, he regularly gives the writers ideas for upcoming sketches. This causes a major frustration for the staff, so Liz tells Jack that the writers do not like his involvement. Jack says that although he enjoyed joining the writers every day, he tells Liz that he accepts their decision.

Afterwards, Jack's secretary tells Liz that Jack wants her to apologize, but that she has to pretend that it was her idea. Liz goes to Jack's office and apologizes, and they forgive each other. While the staff eats their lunch, Jack introduces the staff to two of his guests. The writers mention to Liz that they would love to go outside to the same roof that is used for The Today Show, and Liz tells them that she can make it happen now that she and Jack are friends. Liz asks Jack, but he denies the request. He tells her that the two guests were his bosses from GE, and then criticizes Liz and her staff. He apologizes to Liz, but she says that their friendship is over. Having settled the situation with Jack, Liz tries to talk to her assistant Cerie about her attire, which seems to distract the writers. Liz attempts to convince her to wear something conservative, but Cerie tells Liz that she would look great in something sexy herself, and Liz is later seen walking down the hallway with a dress that reads "Dirty Diva".

Kenneth, who is now working for Tracy, learns that working for Tracy is more than he expected. Tracy orders Kenneth to complete several tasks, including going to Yankee Stadium for nachos, and picking up an important package, which turns out to be an illegal fish that Tracy wants to put in his aquarium. Tracy then tells Kenneth to buy something for his wife, Angie Jordan (Sharon Wilkins), and to take her to a fancy restaurant, where he gives her Tracy's gift.

== Production ==
30 Rock and Studio 60 on the Sunset Strip, both of which debuted on 2006–07 NBC lineup, revolved around the off-camera happenings on a sketch comedy series. Evidence of the overlapping subject matter between the shows, as well as the conflict between them, arose when Aaron Sorkin, the creator of Studio 60 on the Sunset Strip, asked Lorne Michaels to allow him to observe Saturday Night Live for a week, a request Michaels denied. Despite this, Sorkin sent Fey flowers after NBC announced it would pick up both series, and wished her luck with 30 Rock. Fey wound up "winning" over Sorkin when Studio 60 on the Sunset Strip was cancelled after one season and 30 Rock was renewed for a second and eventually went on to have seven seasons. Though 30 Rock's first season ratings proved lackluster and were lower than those of Studio 60 on the Sunset Strip, the latter was more expensive to produce. "Jack the Writer" contains a self-referencing walk and talk sequence, which is commonly used on Studio 60 on the Sunset Strip and Sorkin's previous series.

Star Wars is frequently referenced in 30 Rock, beginning with the pilot episode where Tracy Jordan is seen shouting that he is a Jedi. Liz Lemon admits to being a huge fan of Star Wars, saying that she had watched it many times with Pete Hornberger (Scott Adsit), and saying she dressed up as the Star Wars character Princess Leia for several Halloweens. Fey, a fan of Star Wars herself, said that the weekly Star Wars joke or reference "started happening organically" when the crew realized that they had a Star Wars reference "in almost every show". Fey said that from then on "it became a thing where [they] tried to keep it going", and that even though they could not include one in every episode, they still had a "pretty high batting average". Fey attributed most of the references to Robert Carlock, who she described as "the resident expert". In this episode, Liz repeatedly uses analogies from Star Wars for her situation with Jack, when she realizes that she "need[s] to get new DVDs".

== Reception ==
According to the Nielsen ratings system, "Jack the Writer" was watched by approximately 4.61 million American viewers, ranking eighty-first in the weekly charts. The episode received a rating of 1.7/5 in the key adults 18–49 demographic. The 1.7 refers to 1.7% of all 18- to 49-year-olds, and the 5 refers to 5% of all 18- to 49-year-olds watching television at the time of the broadcast. In the United Kingdom, the episode attracted 500,000 viewers and a 4% share of the viewing audience at the time of the broadcast.

Robert Canning of IGN felt that while the episode was "still an entertaining half-hour, there was nothing to it that was incredibly memorable." He said that Tracy Jordan was "quickly becoming one of the more enjoyable aspects of the show". Matt Webb Mitovich of TV Guide felt that "this outing fell a bit flat for [him]". He thought that "the best moment this week, by far, had to be that big, fat wink to Aaron Sorkin's Studio 60 on the Sunset Strip (and West Wing, and Sports Night... ), where Liz and Pete, upon realizing that they had traveled in a small circle over the course of a banter exchange, shrugged and said, 'Nice walk-and-talk', and then bumped fists. Nice."
