= Jack-Tor =

- 30 Rock episode
- Episode no.: Season 1 Episode 5
- Directed by: Don Scardino
- Written by: Robert Carlock
- Cinematography by: Michael Trim
- Production code: 107
- Original air date: November 16, 2006

Guest appearances
- Katrina Bowden as Cerie Xerox; Lonny Ross as Josh Girard; Keith Powell as Toofer Spurlock; Maulik Pancholy as Jonathan; Teddy Coluca as Stage Manager; James Murtaugh as Ron; Ghostface Killah as himself; Donald Glover as Young P.A.; Doug Moe as Host; Matthew Stocke as Snapple Man

Episode chronology
← Previous "Jack the Writer"	Next → "Jack Meets Dennis"
- 30 Rock season 1

"Jack-Tor" is the fifth episode of the first season of the American situation comedy 30 Rock, which aired on November 16, 2006 on the NBC network in the United States, and on November 8, 2007 in the United Kingdom. The episode was written by Robert Carlock and was directed by Don Scardino. Guest stars in this episode include Katrina Bowden, Lonny Ross, Keith Powell, Maulik Pancholy, Teddy Coluca, Donald Glover, Doug Moe, and Matthew Stocke.

The episode focuses on Jack Donaghy's (Alec Baldwin) pressure on the writers of TGS with Tracy Jordan to integrate General Electric products into the show, which forces Liz Lemon (Tina Fey) to integrate Jack himself into a self-referential sketch about product placement. Frank Rossitano (Judah Friedlander) and James "Toofer" Spurlock (Keith Powell) trick Jenna Maroney (Jane Krakowski) into thinking that her job is in danger, and Liz wonders if Tracy Jordan (Tracy Morgan) might be illiterate when he refuses to read cue cards.

== Plot ==
Jack tells Liz and the writers of TGS Tracy Jordan that he wants them to insert General Electric (GE) products into the show. The writers express their reluctance in doing product placements for GE (even though during the scene the cast talk about how great Snapple's White Green Tea tastes), but Liz agrees on the condition that Jack appears in the sketch. The next day, Liz watches a video containing outtakes from Jack's product placement video, where she discovers that he repeatedly forgot his lines after 142 takes. After realizing that he needs help, Liz encourages Jack to go through with the sketch, which he ultimately is able to shoot.

Tracy decides that he is going to take a break from rehearsals after he is called back on stage to read his cue cards. When Tracy appears to be ignoring his cue cards, Jenna informs Liz of the situation, and realizes that Tracy might be illiterate, citing an earlier promo cue card mishap ("The Aftermath") as an example. Liz confronts Tracy about the problem; he admits that he is illiterate and agrees to get help. Liz later notices Tracy reading a newspaper in the elevator, and learns that he was feigning illiteracy to get out of rehearsing and taking his job seriously. Liz tells Tracy that she is not going to take it anymore, and forces him to go through with the sketch.

Jenna tells Pete that she wishes to insert a music number called "Muffin Top" into the show, which she claims is a big hit overseas. As a prank, Frank and Toofer tell her that several people are going to be fired. Believing them, Jenna tries to seduce an NBC executive whom she sees talking to Jack. Liz later notifies Jenna that no one is going to be fired, and that the executive is actually an extra on the show. Jenna aims to get back at the pair, and although Toofer admits that he was too smart for Jenna's tactics, Frank is seen running around naked outside Jack's balcony. Jenna finally gets her chance to perform "Muffin Top", unaware that the show went off the air two minutes ago and the musical number was cut for time.

== Production ==
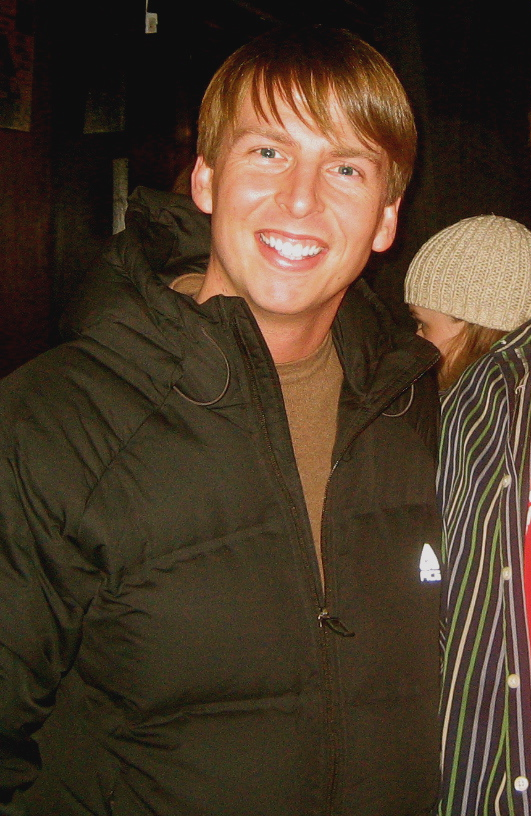
Although credited, Jack McBrayer did not appear in this episode.

In an effort to improve ratings, "Jack-Tor" was the first episode of 30 Rock to air on a Thursday night, which is advertised by NBC as "Comedy Night Done Right". 30 Rock was also one of several sitcoms to have a "super-sized" episode, which NBC employed as a sweeps stunt, and to initiate a mostly comedy lineup. Instead of the usual 30-minute episodes, "Jack-Tor" was increased to 40 minutes. Despite the increased length of the episode, Jack McBrayer, who plays Kenneth Parcell, received credits but did not appear in the show, except for a brief non-speaking cameo at the very end when Jenna is singing "Muffin Top". Fey said that there was "such a big ensemble" in the episode that he was crowded out. Fey said that she thought "McBrayer is fantastic", and that she is "planning to use him lots and lots". Executive producer Lorne Michaels also praised McBrayer, saying "we're very high on him. He's obviously the breakout performer on the series. We like him, the network likes him, viewers like him, everybody likes him."

Star Wars is frequently referenced in 30 Rock, beginning with the pilot episode where Tracy Jordan is seen shouting that he is a Jedi. Liz Lemon admits to being a huge fan of Star Wars, saying that she had watched it many times with Pete Hornberger, and saying she dressed up as the Star Wars character Princess Leia during four Halloweens. Fey, a fan of Star Wars herself, said that the weekly Star Wars joke or reference "started happening organically" when the crew realized that they had a Star Wars reference "in almost every show". Fey said that from then on "it became a thing where [they] tried to keep it going", and that even though they could not include one in every episode, they still had a "pretty high batting average". Fey attributed most of the references to Robert Carlock, who she described as "the resident expert". In this episode, Star Wars is referenced when Frank mentions a "friend in accounting" named Lando Calrissian, a prominent Star Wars character.

== Reception ==
"Regardless of problems, 30 Rock has earned its spot on the schedule, and not just because comedies are in such woefully short supply – although, come to think of it, that might be reason enough right there. 30 Rock is as good as The Office, My Name Is Earl and the rapidly aging Scrubs. All four shows lined up in a row do not compare with NBC's greatest Thursday nights, but network executives deserve at least a peep of gratitude for keeping the freshmen on the air while smart people tinker with the entrails and make the shows better."

— Tom Shales of The Washington Post on 30 Rock's timeslot change.

"Jack-Tor" brought in an average of 5.2 million American viewers upon its original broadcast in the United States, achieving a 2.4/6 in the key 18- to 49-year-old demographic. The 2.4 refers to 2.4% of all people of ages 18–49 years old, and the 6 refers to 6% of all people of ages 18–49 years old watching television at the time of the broadcast. 30 Rock's timeslot change, from Wednesday to Thursday, which was aimed at improving ratings, was a success compared to the previous episode, "Jack the Writer"; it was watched by approximately 4.61 million American viewers, and only received a rating of 1.7/5 in the key adults 18–49 demographic. Overall, however, the move was thought to be a failure. Joal Ryan of E! reported that the "sparse crowd" of 5.2 million viewers was a large decrease from the ratings 30 Rock achieved on Wednesdays, where it averaged 6.3 million viewers per episode.

Matt Webb Mitovich of TV Guide said that while the storyline of Liz being forced to integrate GE products into the show was a "good idea", it "missed the bull's-eye". He also felt that the storyline of putting Jack on TGS with Tracy Jordan was "fun", but thought "that for some reason fell a bit flat". Tom Shales of The Washington Post felt that "30 Rock had "consistently and considerably improved since its premiere". He praised Alec Baldwin, whose performance he described as "rare and rich [...] perilously close to perfect, beyond improving". Shales said that it was "painful to report" that Jack McBrayer was absent in the episode, saying he was "the show's brightest discovery", and his "performance has been a bittersweet beauty". Rob Canning of IGN said that 30 Rock's was "one new comedy we do not want to see taken off the air". He said that "Jack-Tor" had him "laughing from every angle", and may have "begun a debate as to which character is more fun to watch – Jack Donaghy or Tracy Jordan?". He said that the outtakes of Jack's sketch were "one of the best parts of the episode", and that Tracy was evolving into his own "uniquely hilarious character". Overall, he felt that Jack was winning the "comedy showdown".

Robert Carlock, the writer of the episode, was nominated for his work for a Primetime Emmy Award for Outstanding Writing in a Comedy Series.
