= Fireworks (30 Rock) =

- 30 Rock episode
- Episode no.: Season 1 Episode 18
- Directed by: Beth McCarthy
- Written by: Brett Baer; Dave Finkel
- Cinematography by: Vanja Černjul
- Production code: 118
- Original air date: April 5, 2007

Guest appearances
- Will Arnett as Devon Banks; Kay Cannon as Wife; Matt Dickinson as Matt; Dave Finkel as Husband; Chris Parnell as Dr. Leo Spaceman; Maulik Pancholy as Jonathan; Maury Povich as himself; Keith Powell as Toofer Spurlock; Al Roker as himself; Kissy Simmons as Sally Hemings; Jason Sudeikis as Floyd DeBarber

Episode chronology
← Previous "The Fighting Irish"	Next → "Corporate Crush"
- 30 Rock season 1

"Fireworks" is the eighteenth episode of NBC's first season of 30 Rock. It was written by two of the season's co-executive producers Brett Baer and Dave Finkel, and it was directed by Beth McCarthy. It first aired on April 5, 2007 in the United States. Guest stars in this episode include Will Arnett, Kay Cannon, Dave Finkel, Chris Parnell, Maulik Pancholy, Maury Povich, Keith Powell, Al Roker, Kissy Simmons, and Jason Sudeikis.

In this episode, Jack Donaghy (Alec Baldwin) stages a televised firework display, in an attempt to show up his rival, Devon Banks (Will Arnett). Devon, upon their first meeting, develops a crush on Kenneth Parcell (Jack McBrayer). Liz Lemon (Tina Fey) follows Floyd (Jason Sudeikis), a colleague whom she is attracted to, into Alcoholics Anonymous (AA) in an attempt to get closer to him. Tracy Jordan (Tracy Morgan) discovers that he is related to Thomas Jefferson and decides to honor his ancestor. James "Toofer" Spurlock (Keith Powell) discovers a shocking secret about one of his own ancestors.

== Plot ==
When Devon Banks, the Vice President of West Coast News, Web Content, and Theme Park Talent Relations visits from Los Angeles, Jack fears that he is trying to take his job. After having his assistant Jonathan spy on Banks, he learns that Banks is gay and that he is interested in Kenneth. Jack sends Kenneth to try to gather information on what Banks is planning to do, but Kenneth is inept and fails at the task. Jack then enlists Liz to help him come up with some ideas so that he can impress the network and win the power coup over Banks. Jack sends Kenneth to seduce Banks again so that he will be late for the important meeting, but Banks sees through the plan and arrives at the meeting anyway.

Meanwhile, Liz sees Floyd, the corporate employee who she has a crush on, go into a church on a Tuesday afternoon. The next week, she follows him in and finds that he is attending an AA meeting. Liz pretends to be an alcoholic so that she can get closer to Floyd and hear his secrets. After finding out that members of the same AA group are not allowed to date, Liz confesses to Floyd that she was never an alcoholic and that she made it up to get close to him. He gets mad and feels betrayed, so she apologizes and tells him all of her secrets to make it up to him. Floyd forgives her and they begin dating.

When it comes time for Jack's important meeting with the network and showdown against Devon Banks, Liz is too busy pursuing Floyd to help Jack with his idea. Jack has to attend the meeting alone, but his idea for a fireworks special impresses the network and he successfully defends his job against Devon Banks. When the fireworks special actually airs, however, the fireworks are shot off in midtown New York outside Rockefeller Center, on a day that's not the Fourth of July, and it ends up looking like a terrorist attack similar to the September 11 attacks. Panic results and the mayor calls, causing the event to be unceremoniously ended.

Tracy is served with paternity papers and insists that the child is not his. After the DNA test, Tracy learns that the child isn't his, but that he is a direct descendant of Thomas Jefferson and, because of this, Tracy is considered more white than black. The news angers Tracy and he talks to Toofer and Frank about it. Toofer learns that he is a direct descendant of Tobias Spurlock, a black Confederate soldier that Toofer always thought fought for the Union. Tracy and Toofer are upset about the news until Tracy has a dream in which Thomas Jefferson (portrayed by Alec Baldwin) appears to him on an episode of The Maury Povich Show where Tracy finds out the DNA results on who is father is and, while Tracy fights Jefferson, Sally Hemings walks off the stage and calls Jefferson a "dawg". In the dream, Jefferson takes credit for "inventing" America and tells Tracy to forget his past. Tracy decides that he wants Toofer to write a movie about their experiences and Thomas Jefferson's life. Tracy intends to play all of the parts in the movie, but still intends for the film to be a drama.

== Production ==
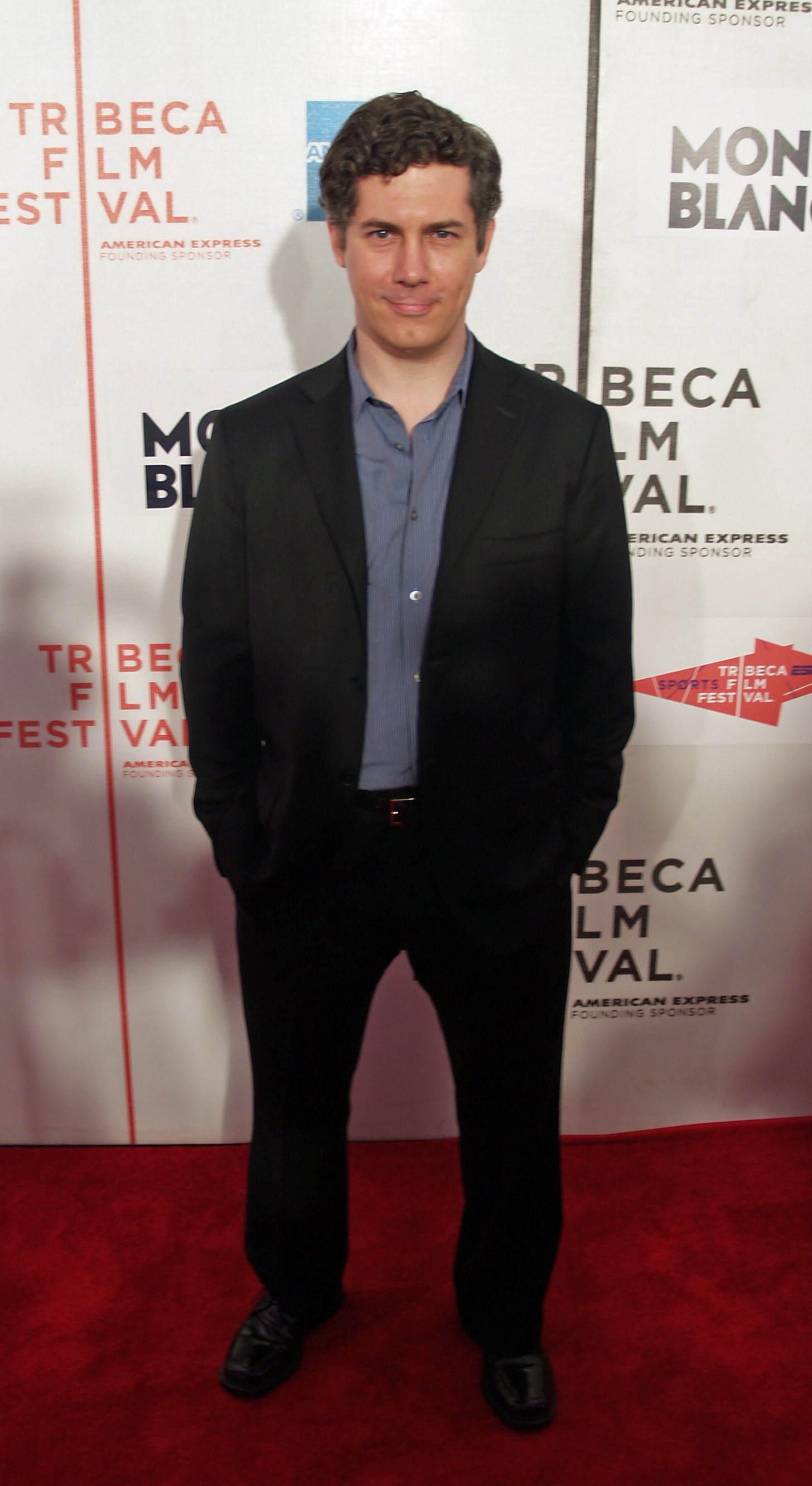
Chris Parnell, who is a recurring guest star, appeared in the main cast of Saturday Night Live along with series stars, Tina Fey and Tracy Morgan.

This is Jack McBrayer and Will Arnett's third time working together. McBrayer made guest appearances as a country club waiter in "Burning Love" and "S.O.B.s", two episodes of the situation comedy Arrested Development. Arnett, a member of the main cast of Arrested Development, played George Oscar "G.O.B." Bluth II in that series. The plot of the Arrested Development episode in which McBrayer appeared revolved around G.O.B. accidentally becoming a waiter at the Bluth family's country club.

This episode was advertised by NBC as a "supersized" episode, with the total runtime extended from 30 minutes to 40 minutes. It aired at 8:40 pm, after "The Negotiation" episode of The Office, as opposed to 9:00 pm which was the series' usual timeslot.

The husband and wife characters who appear in the 10-second internet sitcom, Makin' It Happen, are played by Dave Finkel and Kay Cannon. Finkel and Cannon are both staff writers on 30 Rock. Cannon was, at the time, also married to guest star Jason Sudeikis and Finkel co-wrote this episode. A series of Makin' It Happen was produced and the webisodes aired on NBC.com.

Star Wars is referenced twice in this episode: once when Liz tells Floyd that she and Pete are watching the movies on the AFI's 100 Years... 100 Movies list, but they only own Star Wars and Tootsie so they keep watching those two films. It is again referenced during Tracy's dream, when Thomas Jefferson holds his hand up to Tracy and says "May the Force be with you".

== Reception ==
"Fireworks" brought in an average of 5.4 million American viewers upon its original broadcast in the United States, achieving a 2.5/7 in the key 18- to 49-year-old demographic. The 2.5 refers to 2.5% of all people of ages 18–49 years old, and the 7 refers to 7% of all people of ages 18–49 years old watching television at the time of the broadcast. Compared to the previous episode, "The Fighting Irish", which aired on March 8, 2007, "Fireworks" gained 200,000 viewers.

Matt Webb Mitovich of TV Guide thought that Will Arnett, who appeared as Devon Banks, was "shrewdly cast". Webb Mitovich added that this episode displayed some "good, good stuff". Anna Johns of AOL's TV Squad declared "Fireworks" as "one of the best episodes so far this season" citing that "the writers juggled a handful of storylines very, very well". She wrote that the best part of the episodes were "the one-liners. They had [her] laughing so hard that [she] frequently had to pause the TiVo to recover." Robert Canning of IGN wrote that this episode "was another prime example of what this show is capable of". He thought that "the choice of Arnett as Jack Donaghy's nemesis was perfect, right down to their shared graveled vocal delivery", and that recurring character Chris Parnell's "short, quick hitting scenes are always nonsensical perfection".
