= Daisy Gardner =

American television writer and comedian (born 1976)

- Born: September 24, 1976 (age 48); Colorado Springs, Colorado
- Occupation(s): Actress, writer, comedian
- Years active: 1997–present
- Children: 2

Daisy Gardner (born September 24, 1976) is an American television writer and comedian who is best known for her work as a writer on the NBC series 30 Rock, Showtime's Californication, and Comedy Central's South Park. She also appears on TruTV's World's Dumbest... as a commentator.

== Life and career ==
Daisy Gardner was born September 24, 1976, and raised in Colorado Springs, Colorado. Gardner grew up loving all forms of the arts, especially movies and theatre productions. In 1997, Gardner graduated from Wellesley College.

In 2002, she co-wrote the episode Red Hot Catholic Love on the Comedy Central hit show South Park. In 2003, while still struggling to find work, she played as an extra in the independent comedy Melvin Goes to Dinner.

From 2007 to 2009, she wrote four episodes of Californication. She worked as a story editor for eleven episodes and as an executive producer for four more episodes. During her time working for Californication, she also appeared in an episode as a character credited as Crusty Cashier. After leaving Californication, she wrote an episode of 30 Rock.

During mid-2008, she joined the cast of TruTV Presents: World's Dumbest..., which is a weekly countdown that takes a comedic look at 20 half-witted and offbeat events caught on camera and sometimes by 911 dispatchers. She appeared in 89 episodes as a commentator, along with many B and C-list comedians. After finishing World's Dumbest... She wrote the short video Thank You From The Porn Industry, and has begun working for the hit show Married.

She currently resides in Los Angeles, California with her two kids.

== Filmography ==
Year	Title	Role	Notes
World's Dumbest...	2008 - 2013 (89 episodes)	As Herself	
Californication	2007	Crusty Cashier	
Melvin Goes to Dinner	2003	Extra	
