= JoAnn Alfano =

American television producer

JoAnn Alfano is an American television producer.

== Career ==
Alfano replaced Suzanne Daniels as Executive Vice President Entertainment at Lifetime Networks in late 2008.

Prior to starting TV Tray Entertainment in June 2007, Alfano was President of Broadway Video Television, where she developed and executive produced NBC's 30 Rock and the ABC series Sons and Daughters.

Alfano rose through the ranks at NBC, from New York-based publicist to become Senior Vice President of Drama Development, and then Senior Vice President of Comedy Development. She was also Vice President of Prime Time Series for NBC Studios. Before that, Alfano was Director of Current Comedy for NBC Entertainment. She had previously been Director, NBC Media Relations and Primetime Series.

Before joining Lifetime, Alfano was president of her production company, TV Tray Entertainment, which had a first look deal at NBC Universal Media Studios.

== Productions ==
- 30 Rock (executive producer)
- To Love and Die (executive producer)
- Sons & Daughters
- Thick and Thin
- Tales of the City
- Will and Grace
- Queer as Folk
- Project Runway
- The Tracy Morgan Show

== Awards and nominations ==
Alfano was among those who shared the Emmy Award for Outstanding Comedy Series in 2007, and she was among those nominated for the Emmy Award for Outstanding Reality Competition Program in 2011.
