= Jack Burditt =

American producer and screenwriter

- Occupations: Television producer, screenwriter
- Father: George Burditt

Jack Burditt is an American producer and screenwriter who has worked on television shows like Unbreakable Kimmy Schmidt, Frasier, 30 Rock, Last Man Standing, Modern Family, The Mindy Project, and Ted Lasso. He won two Emmy awards for his work on Frasier and three as an Executive Producer on 30 Rock.

== Biography ==
Burditt is the son of the late writer and producer George Burditt and Joyce Burditt. He has one brother, Paul, and one sister, Ellen.

He worked as a writer on 30 Rock and was nominated for the Writers Guild of America Award for Best Comedy Series at the February 2009 ceremony for his work on the third season.

Burditt created the comedy Last Man Standing, which premiered in fall 2011 on ABC. The show was moved to Fox in its seventh season.

== Filmography ==
- Nobody Wants This (2024-present)
- The Santa Clauses (2022–2023)
- Modern Family (2017–2020)
- Unbreakable Kimmy Schmidt (2015–2019)
- The Mindy Project (2013–2017)
- Last Man Standing (2011–2021)
- 30 Rock (2006–2013)
- The New Adventures of Old Christine (2009–2010)
- Deal (2005)
- I'm With Her (2003–2004)
- Watching Ellie (2002–2003)
- DAG (2000–2001)
- Just Shoot Me! (1997–2000)
- Frasier (1996)
- Ink (1996–1997)
- Mad About You (1994-1995)
