= Grizz Chapman =

American television actor (1974–2026)

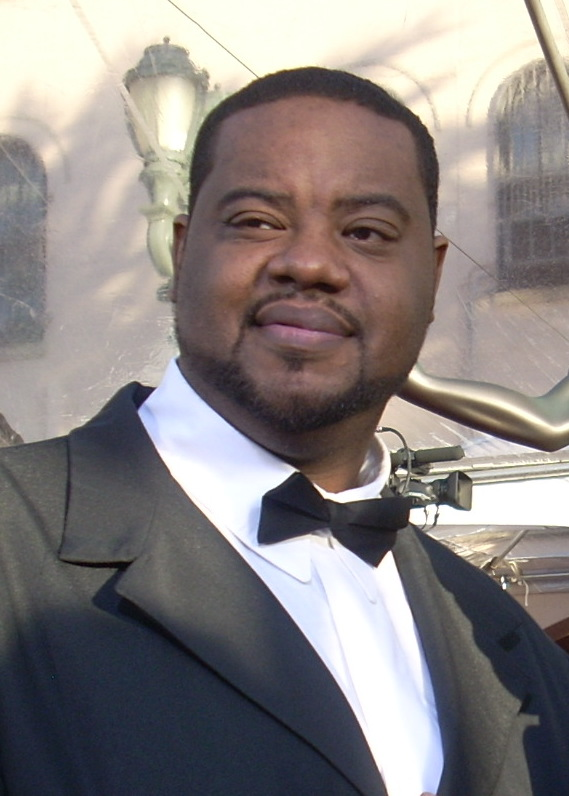
- Chapman at the 2009 SAG Awards
- Born: Mack D. Chapman; April 16, 1974; New York City, U.S.
- Died: May 22, 2026 (aged 52)
- Occupation: Actor
- Years active: 2006–2021
- Height: 6 ft 11 in (211 cm)
- Spouse: Diana Chapman (m. 2002)
- Children: 2

Grizzwald "Grizz" Chapman (born Mack D. Chapman; April 16, 1974 – May 22, 2026) was an American actor best known for his recurring role as Grizz on the NBC series 30 Rock.

== Life and career ==
Chapman was born Mack D. Chapman in Brooklyn on April 16, 1974. Prior to acting he had worked as a bodyguard.

Chapman had appeared in more than 80 episodes of the sitcom 30 Rock, where he and fellow actor Kevin Brown played members of Tracy Jordan's entourage. In his commentary for the episode "Tracy Does Conan", Tracy Morgan revealed that they met when Chapman was working as a bouncer at a strip club. Chapman also revealed in an interview that there were originally meant to be four members of Jordan's entourage, and that he had to compete for the role. Chapman and Kevin Brown were featured in a season six episode of Hidden Potential, a home remodeling show on HGTV.

Chapman had severe hypertension and had been undergoing dialysis three days per week while filming 30 Rock episodes. He received a kidney transplant in July 2010 from a donor and fan of the show. Due to his battle with his kidney disease, on March 31, 2010, Chapman became a spokesperson for the National Kidney Foundation. He appeared on The Dr. Oz Show in December 2009 to raise awareness about hypertension and kidney disease.

Standing at 7 feet tall, his career was limited by him often being typecast as large, imposing characters. He stated in an interview with The Hollywood Reporter in 2013: “Why can’t I be a teacher? Why can’t I be a football coach? Why can’t I be a cab driver? Anything. Anything else than that. I can cry. I can do those things that they think the big guys can’t do. So just give us a chance.” His other acting credits included appearances on the TV shows Blue Bloods, The Blacklist and the films Money Monster and The Cobbler.

He created his own series of YouTube videos known as Grizz Chroniclez featuring him in variety sketches. In 2012, he was in production with writers Sam Morgan and Chadwick Prima for his own series called The Lair, based on the comic store Chapman owned in the Bronx.

Chapman lived in the Washington, D.C., suburb of Woodbridge, Virginia. On December 2, 2024, his home was destroyed when a crash sent a tractor-trailer slamming into it. Chapman was not home but many of his belongings were damaged.

Chapman died in his sleep on May 22, 2026, from chronic kidney disease, at the age of 52. He is survived by his wife Diana and two children.
