= 30 Rock =

American television sitcom (2006–2013)

- Genre: Sitcom; Satire; Surreal comedy
- Created by: Tina Fey
- Showrunners: Tina Fey; Robert Carlock
- Starring: Tina Fey; Tracy Morgan; Jane Krakowski; Jack McBrayer; Scott Adsit; Judah Friedlander; Alec Baldwin; Katrina Bowden; Keith Powell; Lonny Ross; Kevin Brown; Grizz Chapman; Maulik Pancholy; John Lutz
- Music by: Jeff Richmond
- Country of origin: United States
- Original language: English
- No. of seasons: 7
- No. of episodes: 138 (list of episodes)

Production
- Executive producers: Lorne Michaels; Tina Fey; JoAnn Alfano; Marci Klein; David Miner; Robert Carlock; Jeff Richmond; John Riggi; Jack Burditt
- Producer: Jerry Kupfer
- Production locations: Silvercup Studios; New York City, New York
- Editor: Ken Eluto
- Camera setup: Single-camera (136 episodes); Multi-camera (2 live episodes)
- Running time: 22 minutes
- Production companies: Broadway Video; Little Stranger, Inc.; Universal Television (Note: Previously credited as NBC Universal Television Studio in seasons 1–2 and Universal Media Studios in seasons 2–5)

Original release
- Network: NBC
- Release: October 11, 2006 – January 31, 2013

30 Rock is an American satirical surrealist sitcom television series created by Tina Fey that originally aired on NBC from 2006 to 2013. The series, based on Fey's experiences as Saturday Night Live's head writer, takes place behind the scenes of a fictional live sketch comedy show depicted as airing on NBC. The series's name refers to New York City’s 30 Rockefeller Plaza, home to NBC Studios and Saturday Night Live. The series was produced by Lorne Michaels's Broadway Video and Fey's Little Stranger, in association with NBCUniversal.

Most 30 Rock episodes were produced in a single-camera setup and were filmed in New York. The pilot episode premiered on October 11, 2006 and was followed by seven seasons. The series stars Fey with a supporting cast that includes Alec Baldwin, Tracy Morgan, Jane Krakowski, Jack McBrayer, Scott Adsit, Judah Friedlander, Katrina Bowden, Keith Powell, Lonny Ross, John Lutz, Kevin Brown, Grizz Chapman, and Maulik Pancholy.

30 Rock was known for its use of parody to satirize the corporate structure of NBC and its parent companies General Electric and Comcast. 30 Rock won several major awards (including Primetime Emmy Awards for Outstanding Comedy Series in 2007, 2008, and 2009 and nominations for every other year it ran) and appeared on many critics' year-end best-of lists. Over the course of the series, it was nominated for 103 Primetime Emmy Awards and won 16, in addition to numerous other nominations and wins from other awards shows. Despite the critical acclaim, the series struggled in the ratings throughout its run.

30 Rock is regarded as a landmark series. Its series finale in particular has been named as one of the greatest in television history by several publications. In 2013, the Writers Guild of America West named 30 Rock the 21st best-written television series of all time.

== Premise ==
Liz Lemon is head writer and showrunner of the NBC sketch comedy series TGS with Tracy Jordan (originally called The Girlie Show), loosely based on the real Saturday Night Live and produced in the fictional Studio 6H in 30 Rockefeller Plaza. She supervises cast and crew, including star Jenna Maroney, her best friend, while working with network executive Jack Donaghy and page Kenneth Parcell. In the first episode, Jack forces Liz to hire the unpredictable Tracy Jordan as co-star.

Episodes often depict conservative Jack and liberal Liz's disagreements, Jenna's attempts to become a film star, Tracy's immature behavior, and the characters' romantic and personal lives. In later seasons, the show depicts the network being acquired by Philadelphia-based media company Kabletown, a fictionalization of the acquisition of NBC Universal by Comcast. Tonally, 30 Rock uses surreal humor to parody the complex corporate structure of NBC and its parent companies General Electric and Comcast. Described as "a live-action cartoon", the show was known for its extensive and effective use of cutaways, sight gags, and breaking the fourth wall.

== Development and production ==
=== Conception ===
In 2002, Fey was the head writer and a performer on the television show Saturday Night Live (SNL). She pitched the show that became 30 Rock to NBC, originally as a sitcom about cable news. According to Time Magazine, NBC Entertainment president Kevin Reilly felt that "Fey was using the news setting as a fig leaf for her own experience and [he] encouraged her to write what she knew." Despite being reluctant at first to "write about writing", Fey's mind changed after conceiving the idea of casting Tracy Morgan as the star of a fictional show.

In May 2003, Fey signed a contract with NBC to remain in her SNL head writer position until at least the 2004–2005 television season and to develop a primetime project to be produced by Broadway Video and NBC Universal. Filming was postponed due to Fey's first pregnancy.

The show's pilot – initially filmed with the title Untitled Tina Fey Project – focused at first on the boss of a variety show who must manage her relationships with the show's volatile star and its executive producer. The storyline evolved into one that dealt with a head writer of a variety show who dealt with both of the stars, as well as the show's new network executive. The show was given the name 30 Rock, referring to the location of both NBC Studios and the location where SNL is filmed. It was officially given the green light to air on May 15, 2006, with a 13-episode order.

The series was produced by Lorne Michaels's Broadway Video (which also produces Saturday Night Live) and Fey's Little Stranger, in association with NBCUniversal.

=== Filming ===
Interior scenes for 30 Rock were mostly filmed at Silvercup Studios in Long Island City, Queens, New York City (Studio 8H in 30 Rock in Manhattan for two live episodes). In the episodes "Cleveland" and "Hiatus", Battery Park City, Manhattan, and Douglaston, Queens, doubled for Cleveland, Ohio, and Needmore, Pennsylvania, respectively. The show often built elaborate sets, once using a set that took three days to build for only six seconds of screen time. In the episode "Gavin Volure", stock footage of the Arkansas Governor's Mansion was used for exterior shots of the home of Steve Martin's character.

30 Rock episodes were produced in a single-camera setup (with the exception of two live episodes that were produced in the multiple-camera setup) and were filmed in New York.

=== Music ===
The series features a "jaunty" jazz score. The music is composed by Fey's husband, Jeff Richmond, who is also a producer for 30 Rock. Richmond wrote the theme music, which was nominated for the Primetime Emmy Award for Outstanding Main Title Theme Music. Several short, original songs have been featured in episodes, many of which were performed by Jane Krakowski, another performed by Fey and Jason Sudeikis, and another performed by Morgan. Canadian singer Michael Bublé contributed to 30 Rock's soundtrack with the fictional song "Mr. Templeton", saying he was very excited to contribute because he "love[s] that show" and finds it "beautiful, [and] so hilarious".

The show also covered three existing songs, including the song "Midnight Train to Georgia" by Gladys Knight and the Pips. The song had its lyrics altered to accommodate the character Kenneth being "misinformed about the time [of the 11:45 train]". The song "Oh My" performed by The Gray Kid is heard throughout the episode "The Source Awards", which was mixed with a piano arrangement composed by Richmond.

The 30 Rock Original Television Soundtrack was released by the Relativity Music Group on November 16, 2010.

=== Internet content ===
On April 2, 2008, NBC announced 30 Rock 360, an online extension of the 30 Rock series. The extension featured Jack Donaghy's Online Business Courses (or Jack U). Users could also read Jack's blogs and upload their own business advice in video form. Users could submit sketches for TGS with Tracy Jordan and act out skits from TGS. The feature reopened Ask Tina, an interactive question and answer platform in which users could ask Fey questions. Fey answered the questions in video form. Ask Tina was a fixture on NBC.com's 30 Rock section throughout the first season.

== Cast and characters ==
=== Main ===
30 Rock features an ensemble cast. The seven roles that receive star billing during the opening credits are:

- Tina Fey as Liz Lemon, a "sexually frightened know-it-all" and head writer of TGS with Tracy Jordan
- Tracy Morgan as Tracy Jordan, the loose-cannon, crazy, and unpredictable star of TGS
- Jane Krakowski as Jenna Maroney, the original star of The Girlie Show, co-star of TGS and Liz's constantly attention-seeking, arrogant, narcissistic, and clueless best friend
- Jack McBrayer as Kenneth Ellen Parcell, a cheerful, simple-minded, obedient Southern-born NBC page who "lives for television"
- Scott Adsit as Pete Hornberger, the "sane", quick-witted producer of TGS, who often reveals embarrassing details about his family life
- Judah Friedlander as Frank Rossitano, a trucker hat-wearing, manchildish, sarcastic writer at TGS whose hat bears a different phrase in every episode
- Alec Baldwin as Jack Donaghy, the decisive, controlling, suave, and occasionally senseless network executive who constantly interferes with the goings-on at TGS

Beginning with season two, several actors received star billing after the opening credits.

- Katrina Bowden as Cerie Xerox, Liz's beautiful, laid-back assistant, who usually wears revealing outfits to work, much to the delight of the writers' room (seasons 2–7; recurring season 1)
- Keith Powell as James "Toofer" Spurlock, a TGS writer who is "two for one", a Harvard guy and a black guy, and the polar opposite of both Tracy and Frank (seasons 2–7; recurring season 1)
- Lonny Ross as Josh Girard, a young and immature TGS writer and co-star, known for his impressions (seasons 2–4; recurring season 1)
- Kevin Brown as Walter "Dot Com" Slattery, an erudite member of Tracy's entourage who is also a Wesleyan University-trained stage actor (seasons 3–7; recurring seasons 1–2)
- Grizz Chapman as Warren "Grizz" Griswold, a gentle giant member of Tracy's entourage (seasons 3–7; recurring seasons 1–2)
- Maulik Pancholy as Jonathan, Jack's loyal and overprotective personal assistant, who at times appears to be in love with Jack (seasons 3–5, 7; recurring seasons 1–2)
- John Lutz as J. D. Lutz, a lazy, overweight TGS writer who is often insulted or made fun of by the rest of the staff (seasons 4–7; recurring seasons 1–3)

=== Recurring ===
- Dean Winters as Dennis Duffy, Liz's irresponsible ex-boyfriend
- Chris Parnell as Leo Spaceman, a quack doctor who regularly provides experimental treatments
- Jason Sudeikis as Floyd DeBarber, a lawyer working in 30 Rockefeller who dates Liz before moving home to Cleveland
- Rachel Dratch appears as several minor characters in seasons 1, 5, and 6, including four episodes as Greta Johansen, a cat wrangler working on TGS
- Sue Galloway as Sue LaRoche-Van der Hout, a French-Dutch writer hired by TGS and often referred to as "girl writer"
- Cheyenne Jackson as Jack "Danny" Baker, a TGS cast member added in the fourth season
- James Marsden as Criss Chros, Liz's boyfriend and later husband, who ran a hot dog stand in his first episodes of the series

=== Casting ===
Fey worked with Jen McNamara and Adam Bernstein for the casting of the series. Fey's first act as casting director was to cast herself as the lead character, Liz Lemon, who is said to be much like Fey herself when she first became head writer on SNL. The next actor to be cast was Tracy Morgan as Tracy Jordan, who was then a former castmate of Fey's in SNL. Morgan was asked by Fey to play the role, and he believed it was "right up [his] alley and it was tailor made for [him]". Fey said that the character of Kenneth was written with McBrayer in mind. McBrayer is an old friend of Fey's (they worked together at Second City in Chicago), and she "really wanted him for that part and was very happy when no one objected".

Rachel Dratch, Fey's longtime comedy partner and fellow SNL alumna, was originally cast to portray Jenna. Dratch played the role in the show's original pilot, but in August 2006, Krakowski was announced as Dratch's replacement, with Dratch remaining involved in the show playing various characters. Fey explained the change by noting that Dratch was better-suited to playing a variety of side characters, and they required more of a straight-ahead acting part for the role of Jenna. Although Fey went on to say, "Rachel and I were both very excited about this new direction," Dratch said that she was not happy with the media's depiction of the change as a demotion; furthermore, she was also skeptical about the reasons she was given for the change and was not happy with the reduction in the number of episodes in which she would appear. Following the first season, Dratch was only used in the show sporadically.

Shortly following the casting of McBrayer and Dratch, Baldwin was cast as Jack, the "totally uncensored" Vice President of East Coast Television and Microwave Oven Programming. Fey said that the character of Jack was written with Baldwin in mind, and she was "very pleasantly surprised when he agreed to do it". Judah Friedlander was cast as Frank Rossitano, a staff writer of The Girlie Show. Friedlander had never met Fey before auditioning for a role in 30 Rock. His character was based on at least two writers with whom Fey used to work at SNL, but he has said that he "certainly brought some of [his] own things to it, as well". Finally, Scott Adsit was cast as Pete Hornberger, a longtime friend of Liz's and producer of The Girlie Show. Adsit, an old friend of Fey's, also had his character written based on him.

Following SNL's ongoing tradition, 30 Rock had several real-life politician cameos, including Al Gore (twice), Nancy Pelosi (series finale) and Condoleezza Rice (as Jack's former love interest).

== Episodes ==
Season	Episodes	Originally released	
Season	Episodes	First released	Last released
1	21	October 11, 2006	April 26, 2007
2	15	October 4, 2007	May 8, 2008
3	22	October 30, 2008	May 14, 2009
4	22	October 15, 2009	May 20, 2010
5	23	September 23, 2010	May 5, 2011
6	22	January 12, 2012	May 17, 2012
7	13	October 4, 2012	January 31, 2013
Special		July 16, 2020	

=== Season 1 ===
Season one began airing on October 11, 2006, and featured 21 episodes. The season finale aired on April 26, 2007. Jack Donaghy, the "Head of East Coast Television and Microwave Oven Programming" at General Electric (GE), is transferred to work at the NBC headquarters, 30 Rockefeller Plaza, and retool the late-night sketch-comedy series The Girlie Show. The show's cast and crew are outraged by this, especially head writer Liz Lemon and main actress Jenna Maroney. Jack proceeds to wreak havoc on The Girlie Show, forcing Liz to hire off-the-wall movie star Tracy Jordan. He again irritates the cast and crew of The Girlie Show when he changes the name to TGS with Tracy Jordan (or just TGS).

As the season progresses, the episodes become less about TGS and more about how the characters deal with juggling their lives and their jobs – mainly Liz, but other characters are also explored. Episodes also become less self-contained, and various story arcs develop in the second half of the season. For example, the first major story arc centers on Liz's relationship with Dennis Duffy (Dean Winters), "The Beeper King". Other story arcs include Jenna promoting her movie The Rural Juror; Tracy going on the run from the Black Crusaders; Jack's engagement, which was eventually called off, to a Christie's auctioneer named Phoebe (Emily Mortimer); and another relationship of Liz's with Floyd (Sudeikis).

=== Season 2 ===
Season two began airing on October 4, 2007, and featured 15 episodes. The second season was originally intended to consist of 22 episodes, but the order was cut to 15 due to the 2007–2008 Writers Guild of America strike. The season finale aired on May 8, 2008. After Liz broke up with Floyd in the summer, she is looking for ways to rebound. When Jerry Seinfeld confronts Jack about a new marketing campaign which featured clips of Seinfeld's sitcom, Seinfeld, in all NBC shows, he has a chance encounter with Liz that gives her some much-needed advice. During the TGS summer hiatus, Jenna becomes overweight due to performing in the Broadway show Mystic Pizza: The Musical (based on the real 1988 film Mystic Pizza). Tracy has encountered some marital problems with his wife Angie Jordan (Sherri Shepherd) and they become separated, but later reunite.

During the season, Jack develops a relationship with a Democratic congresswoman named Celeste "C. C." Cunningham (Edie Falco). They later break up. An arc that was established in the first season, but becomes more apparent in the second, regards Jack running for the GE chairmanship against his nemesis Devon Banks (Will Arnett). The season ends with Liz planning to adopt a child after believing she was pregnant with Dennis' baby. Kenneth also travels to Beijing to be a page at the 2008 Summer Olympics, and Tracy invents a pornographic video game. Jack ends the season working at a new government job in Washington, DC, but plans to get fired by proposing a "gay bomb".

=== Season 3 ===
Season three began airing October 30, 2008, and concluded on May 14, 2009. The show experienced a large ratings and popularity spike this season after Tina Fey's highly praised performance as Sarah Palin on SNL. This is also the season where the show made Primetime Emmy Award history, being nominated for 22 awards. The season consisted of 22 episodes. Oprah Winfrey guest-starred in the second episode, playing herself (actually a drug-induced hallucination by Liz) as well as Jennifer Aniston playing Liz's ex-roommate. Salma Hayek also appeared for a multiple-episode arc, portraying Jack's new girlfriend, Elisa. Other guest stars this season included John Lithgow, Kerry Butler, Megan Mullally, Peter Dinklage, and Steve Martin. Jon Hamm played Liz's love interest and neighbor for several episodes. Alan Alda appeared in the season's final two episodes as Milton Greene, Jack's biological father.

=== Season 4 ===
The fourth season premiered on October 15, 2009. Like the previous season, it also consisted of 22 episodes. A recurring story arc early in the season revolved around Jack's request that Liz cast a new actor for TGS and Liz's subsequent search for the perfect comedian, much to Jenna and Tracy's dismay, who fear losing their spotlight. The show fictionalizes the acquisition of NBC Universal by Comcast, announced during the season, by portraying the network being acquired by Philadelphia-based cable company Kabletown. The latter half of the season focused on complementary story arcs: Jack's inability to choose between his two girlfriends, Liz's inability to find a boyfriend to live up to her expectations, and Jenna's relationship with a Jenna Maroney impersonator. The season also featured such guest stars as Jeff Dunham, Julianne Moore, Jon Bon Jovi, Cheyenne Jackson, Sherri Shepherd, Will Forte, Elizabeth Banks, Michael Sheen, Matt Damon, and James Franco.

=== Season 5 ===
30 Rock premiered its fifth season on September 23, 2010. An episode of 30 Rock's fifth season was produced and broadcast live, twice, on the evening of October 14, 2010. The two separate performances resulted in a live telecast of the episode to American viewers on both the West and East Coasts, to ensure both would view a live performance. Produced in front of a live audience, the episode aired at 8:30 pm EDT and PDT on NBC. A ratings success, the episode was also met with positive reviews.

Season five focuses on Liz Lemon's continuing relationship with Carol Burnett (Matt Damon), Jack's start into fatherhood with fiancée Avery Jessup (Elizabeth Banks), struggling with the merger of NBCUniversal with Kabletown, Tracy's foray into getting an EGOT, and Kenneth's attempt to get back to NBC. Aside from featuring the return of Rachel Dratch in "Live Show", other guest stars include Matt Damon, Elizabeth Banks, Susan Sarandon (as Frank's former teacher – who was in prison due to their relationship while he was a student – and present girlfriend), Paul Giamatti (as one of the TGS editors), Sherri Shepherd, Queen Latifah, Rob Reiner, John Amos, Jon Hamm (reprising his role as Drew, Liz Lemon's former love interest who despite being a doctor, she dumped for being too dumb), Julia Louis-Dreyfus (playing the reimagined version of Liz Lemon and also as herself playing this character in "Live Show"), Bill Hader, Chris Parnell, Kelsey Grammer (playing himself), Buck Henry, David Gregory, John Slattery, Daniel Sunjata, Will Forte, Kelly Coffield Park, Elaine Stritch, Dr. Condoleezza Rice, Alan Alda, Cheyenne Jackson, Robert De Niro (playing himself), Dean Winters, Ken Howard, Vanessa Minnillo, Brian Williams (playing himself), Richard Belzer, Ice-T, John Cho, Chloë Grace Moretz (as Kaylie Hooper – the granddaughter of Kabletown CEO Hank Hooper and Jack's sworn enemy as heir to the Kabletown throne), Terrence Mann (as oceanographer Bob Ballard), Cristin Milioti (as Abby Flynn in "TGS Hates Women"), Eion Bailey, Adriane Lenox, Michael Keaton, Margaret Cho (as Avery's kidnapper, North Korean dictator Kim Jong-il), and Tom Hanks (as himself in "100: Part 1" and "100: Part 2").

=== Season 6 ===
The sixth season debuted mid-season on January 12, 2012, to accommodate Tina Fey's second pregnancy.

Season six finds Liz emotionally maturing while in a new relationship; Jack continues to attempt to recover his wife from North Korea and find his identity at Kabletown, Kenneth moves up (and later down) the corporate ladder. Jenna reaches a new level of fame due to being a judge on a reality show and considers settling down with boyfriend Paul.

Many LGBT groups called for Tracy Morgan's resignation or dismissal from the show due to anti-gay comments he made between the end of season five and the filming for season six. Morgan issued an apology and continued with his starring role. 30 Rock had previously received an award from GLAAD, commending the show on its portrayal of LGBT themes and characters. The scandal inspired the second episode of the season, in which Tracy Jordan goes on an offensive rant during a standup set, forcing the show to apologize on his behalf after he mistakenly apologizes to Glad, the plastic bag company, instead of GLAAD.

=== Season 7 ===
30 Rock returned for a final, abbreviated season consisting of 13 episodes, which began airing on October 4, 2012. Alec Baldwin reportedly approached NBC and offered to cut his pay for 30 Rock to be renewed for a full seventh and eighth seasons, stating on Twitter: "I offered NBC to cut my pay 20% in order to have a full 7th and 8th seasons of 30 Rock. I realize times have changed."

Season seven continues to develop the relationship between Liz and Criss (James Marsden), as the pair try for children and consider getting married. Meanwhile, Jack attempts to improve his prospects at the company, first by trying to "tank" NBC and convince Kabletown CEO Hank Hooper (Ken Howard) to sell it, and later by plotting to discredit Hooper's granddaughter and future CEO, Kaylee Hooper (Chloë Grace Moretz). Ultimately, however, he begins to wonder if he is truly happy. Elsewhere, Tracy has found success with his new movie studio, which produces comedy films mostly starring African American actors, similarly to Tyler Perry; Jenna prepares to marry her long-term boyfriend Paul (Will Forte), and Kenneth has started a relationship with Hazel (Kristen Schaal), unaware that she is using him to get her moment on TGS.

== Reception ==
=== Critical response ===
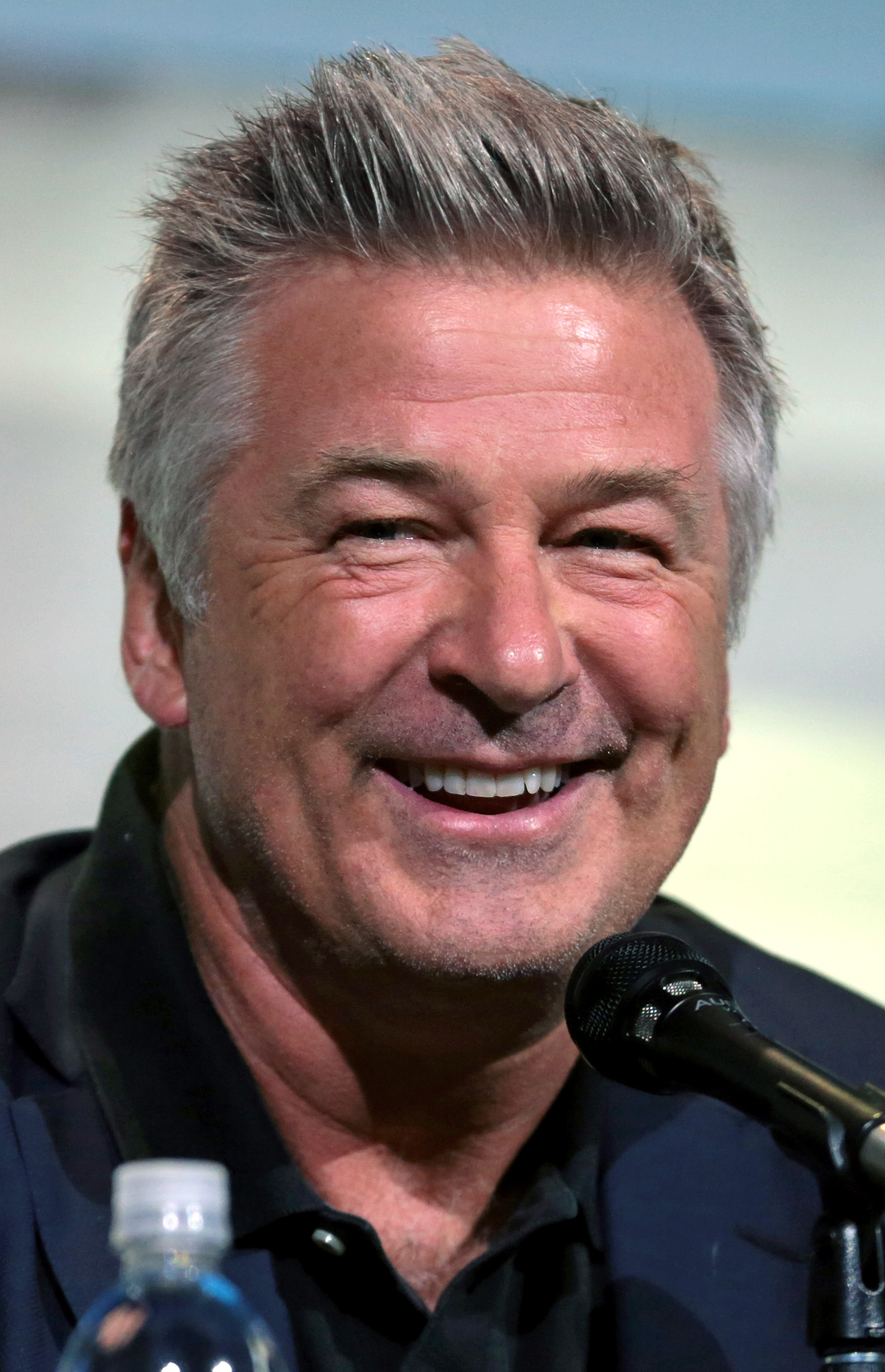
Alec Baldwin's performance as Jack Donaghy was praised by critics.

30 Rock has received critical acclaim from critics and audiences since its release. Chris Harnick, writing in the Huffington Post, has ranked it along with I Love Lucy and Seinfeld as one of the great TV comedies. The Writers Guild of America West listed it as the 21st best written TV series. Its series finale has been rated highly by several publications. HitFix ranked it the 15th best series final, IndieWire included it in its list of 16 best series finals, and HuffPost named it the 5th best.

The first season of 30 Rock was reviewed favorably by critics. Metacritic gave the pilot episode a score—a weighted average based on the impressions of a select thirty-one critical reviews—of 67 out of 100. Robert Abele of LA Weekly declared that the show was a "weirdly appropriate and hilarious symbol of our times". Dorothy Rabinowitz of The Wall Street Journal wrote that the "standard caution is relevant—debut episodes tend to be highly polished. All the more reason to enjoy the hilarious scenes and fine ensemble cast here". Some less favorable reviews were received from Brian Lowry of Variety. Lowry said, "Despite her success with Mean Girls, Fey mostly hits too-familiar notes in the pilot. Moreover, she's a limited protagonist, which is problematic." Maureen Ryan of the Chicago Tribune criticized "30 Rock for being less than the sum of its parts, and, as an entry in the single-camera comedy sweepstakes, it fails to show either the inspired inventiveness of Arrested Development or provide the surprisingly perceptive character studies of The Office".

At the end of 2006, LA Weekly listed 30 Rock as one of the best "Series of the Year". The show also appeared on similar year end "best of" 2006 lists published by The New York Times, The A.V. Club, The Boston Globe, the Chicago Sun-Times, Entertainment Weekly, the Los Angeles Times, the Miami Herald, People Weekly, and TV Guide. The Associated Press wrote that NBC's "Thursday night comedy block—made up of My Name Is Earl, The Office, Scrubs, and 30 Rock—is consistently the best night of prime time viewing for any network." In 2007, it appeared on The Boston Globe's "best of" list as well as the "best of" lists of the Chicago Sun-Times, the Chicago Tribune, Entertainment Weekly, the Los Angeles Times, Newark Star-Ledger, The New York Times, Pittsburgh Post-Gazette, The San Francisco Chronicle, The San Jose Mercury News, TV Guide and USA Today. 30 Rock was named the best series of 2007 by Entertainment Weekly.

At the end of 2009, Newsweek magazine ranked 30 Rock as the best comedy on TV in the past decade, and at the end of 2010, Metacritic reported that the show ranked 12th place in their list of collected Television Critic Top Ten Lists. At the end of 2012, a poll undertaken by 60 Minutes and Vanity Fair named 30 Rock the seventh greatest sitcom of all time. In 2013, the Writers Guild of America named 30 Rock as one of the best-written television series of all time, ranking it at 21st place. In 2019, the series was ranked 12th on The Guardian newspaper's list of the 100 best TV shows of the 21st century. In 2023, Variety ranked 30 Rock #22 on its list of the 100 greatest TV shows of all time.

=== Awards and nominations ===
Capping its critically successful first season, 30 Rock won the Primetime Emmy Award for Outstanding Comedy Series and Elaine Stritch was awarded Outstanding Guest Actress in a Comedy Series in September 2007 for her work as a guest actress in the season one finale episode, "Hiatus". Tina Fey and Alec Baldwin were nominated in the Outstanding Lead Actress and Outstanding Lead Actor in a comedy series categories, respectively. "Jack-Tor" and "Tracy Does Conan" were both nominated for Outstanding Writing for a Comedy Series. 30 Rock received four Creative Arts Emmy Awards. Alec Baldwin received the Golden Globe Award for Best Actor in a Television Series – Musical or Comedy in 2007. Baldwin also received the Screen Actors Guild Award for Outstanding Performance by a Male Actor in a Comedy Series in 2007. The show also received various other guild award nominations during its first season and the Peabody Award.

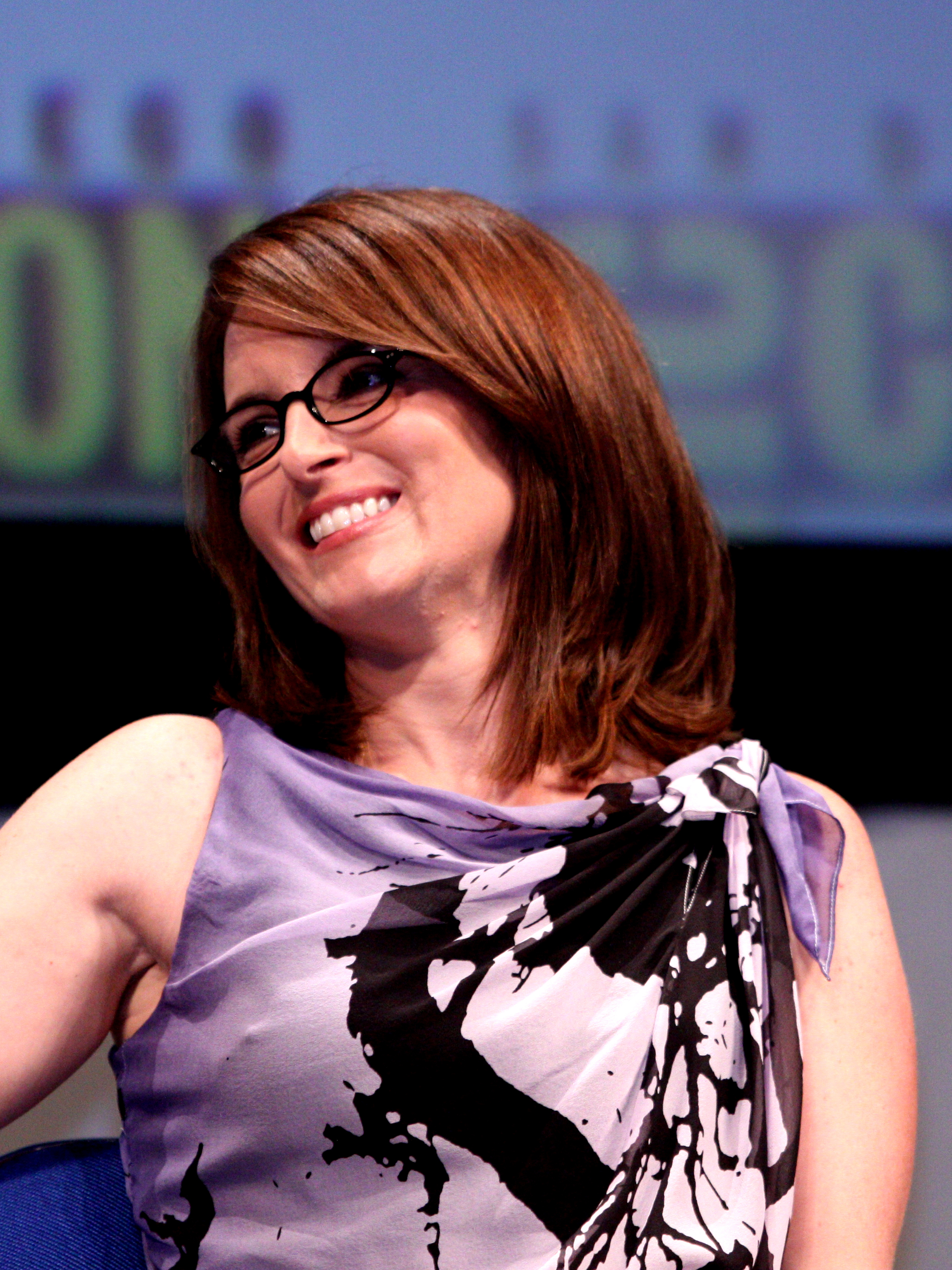
Fey won six Primetime Emmy Awards for her work on 30 Rock.

In 2008, Tina Fey and Alec Baldwin both won Screen Actors Guild Awards. The series took home the Writers Guild of America Award for Best Comedy Series in 2008. It also received the Danny Thomas Producer of the Year Award in Episodic Series – Comedy from the Producers Guild of America in 2008. 30 Rock received 17 Primetime Emmy Award nominations for its second season, making it the second-most nominated series of the year. The 17 nominations broke the record for the most Emmy nominations for a comedy series, breaking the mark previously held by The Larry Sanders Show with 16 nominations in 1996 . 30 Rock also won the Television Critics Association Award for Outstanding Achievement in Comedy.

In 2008, 30 Rock completed a sweep of the major awards at the 60th Primetime Emmy Awards. The show won Outstanding Comedy Series, Alec Baldwin was recognized as Outstanding Lead Actor in a Comedy Series, and Tina Fey was given the award for Outstanding Lead Actress in a Comedy Series. This marked the eighth time in the Primetime Emmy Awards history that a show won best series plus best lead actor and actress. Tina Fey also won the award for Outstanding Writing for a Comedy Series for the second-season finale episode, "Cooter".

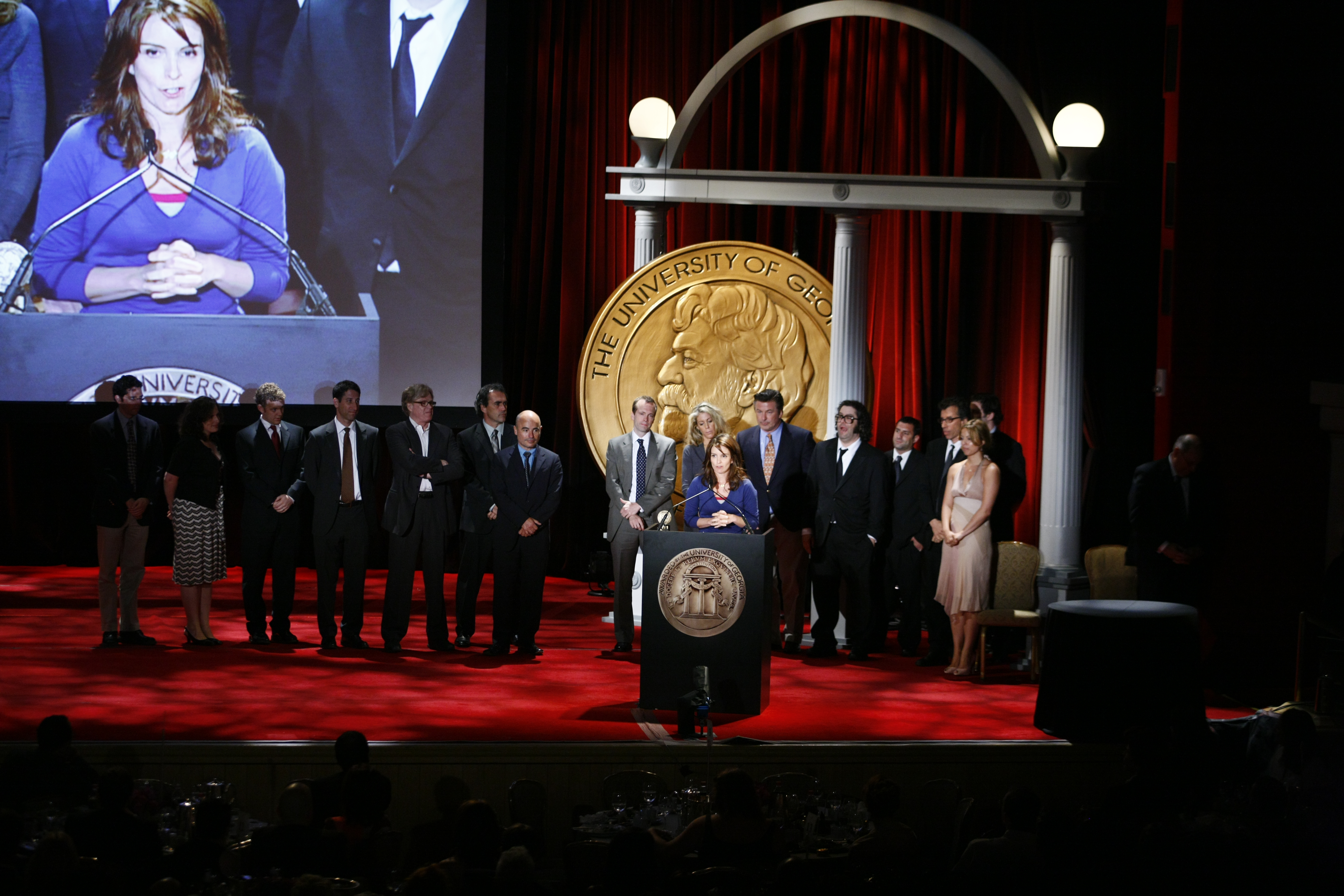
Tina Fey and the cast and crew of 30 Rock at the 67th Annual Peabody Awards

At the 66th Golden Globe Awards, 30 Rock won the award for Best Television Series – Musical or Comedy, Alec Baldwin won Best Actor in a Television Series – Musical or Comedy, and Tina Fey won Best Actress in a Television Series – Musical or Comedy.

At the 67th Annual Peabody Awards, 30 Rock received the Peabody Award for the show's 2007 episodes. Upon announcing the award, the Peabody Board commended the show for being "not only a great workplace comedy in the tradition of The Mary Tyler Moore Show, complete with fresh, indelible secondary characters, but also a sly, gleeful satire of corporate media, especially the network that airs it".

In 2009, 30 Rock received a record-breaking 22 Primetime Emmy Award nominations and won five of them, including Outstanding Comedy Series, Outstanding Lead Actor in a Comedy Series (Baldwin), and Outstanding Writing for a Comedy Series for "Reunion". It received 15 Primetime Emmy Award nominations in 2010, including the series' fourth consecutive nominations for Outstanding Comedy Series, Outstanding Lead Actor in a Comedy Series (Baldwin), and Outstanding Lead Actress in a Comedy Series (Fey). 30 Rock received 13 Primetime Emmy Award nominations in both 2011 and 2012.

In 2013, 30 Rock's seventh and final season received 13 Primetime Emmy Award nominations, the most of any comedy series, including Outstanding Lead Actress in a Comedy Series for Fey, Outstanding Lead Actor in a Comedy Series for Baldwin, Outstanding Supporting Actress in a Comedy Series for Krakowski, directing, two nominations for writing, and its seventh consecutive nomination for Outstanding Comedy Series, bringing the series' total number of nominations to 103. The series' casting directors won their third prize for Outstanding Casting for a Comedy Series, while Tina Fey and Tracey Wigfield won for their writing for the series finale, "Last Lunch".

At the 19th Screen Actors Guild Awards, both Fey and Baldwin won for their performances in the Female and Male comedy categories, respectively, while the cast received their final nomination for Outstanding Performance by an Ensemble in a Comedy Series.

=== Ratings ===
Season	Timeslot (ET)	Premiered		Ended		TV Season	Rank	Viewers (in millions)
Season	Timeslot (ET)	Date	Premiere Viewers (in millions)	Date	Finale Viewers (in millions)	TV Season	Rank	Viewers (in millions)
1	Wednesday 8:00 pm (October 11 – November 1, 2006) Thursday 9:30 pm (November 16, 2006 – March 8, 2007) Thursday 9:00 pm (April 5–26, 2007)	October 11, 2006	8.13	April 26, 2007	4.72	2006–2007	#102	5.8
2	Thursday 8:30 pm (October 4, 2007 – April 17, 2008) Thursday 9:00 pm (December 13, 2007) Thursday 9:30 pm (April 24 – May 8, 2008)	October 4, 2007	7.33	May 8, 2008	5.45	2007–2008	#111	6.5
3	Thursday 9:30 pm (October 30, 2008 – May 14, 2009)	October 30, 2008	8.66	May 14, 2009	5.70	2008–2009	#69	7.5
4	Thursday 9:30 pm (October 15, 2009 – May 20, 2010) Thursday 9:00 pm (January 14, 2010) Thursday 8:30 pm (April 22, 2010)	October 15, 2009	6.39	May 20, 2010	5.36	2009–2010	#86	5.9
5	Thursday 8:30 pm (September 23 – December 9, 2010) Thursday 10:00 pm (January 20 – May 5, 2011) Thursday 10:30 pm (April 28, 2011)	September 23, 2010	5.91	May 5, 2011	4.20	2010–2011	#106	5.3
6	Thursday 8:00 pm (January 12 – March 8, 2012) Thursday 9:00 pm (January 26, 2012) Thursday 8:30 pm (March 15 – May 17, 2012)	January 12, 2012	4.47	May 17, 2012	2.84	2011–2012	#130	4.6
7	Thursday 8:00 pm (October 4, 2012 – January 31, 2013) Wednesday 8:00 pm (October 31, 2012)	October 4, 2012	3.46	January 31, 2013	4.88	2012–2013	#99	4.6

Despite the show's critical acclaim and multiple awards, the series generally struggled in the ratings throughout its run, something which Fey herself has made light of.

The pilot episode generated 8.13 million viewers, the series' highest ratings until that of its third-season premiere which garnered 8.5 million viewers. In its original timeslot of Wednesday at 8:00 pm EST, the show averaged 6.23 million viewers. 30 Rock aired on Wednesdays for its first four episodes. The season's lowest ratings were achieved by "Jack the Writer" and "Hard Ball" which both achieved 4.61 million viewers. The season-two premiere, "SeinfeldVision" was viewed by 7.33 million viewers, the highest rating since the pilot. On January 10, 2008, 30 Rock entered a hiatus due to the 2007–2008 Writers Guild of America strike. The episode that aired on that date was viewed by 5.98 million viewers. The second-season finale, "Cooter", which aired on May 8, 2008, was viewed by 5.6 million viewers.

On December 29, 2006, Nielsen Media Research (NMR) reported the results of having, for the first time, monitored viewers who use a digital video recorder to record shows for later viewing. NMR reported that 30 Rock adds nearly 7.5% to its total audience every week as a result of viewers who use a DVR to record the show and then watch it within a week of its initial airing. A March 2007 report from MAGNA Global, based on NMR data about viewership ranked by among adults 25–54, shows that as of the time of the report 30 Rock's viewers have a median income of $65,000, high enough to place the show tied at 11th in affluence with several other shows. This is during a period where for the season 30 Rock is tied at number 85 in the 18–49 demographic. During its second season, 30 Rock ranked in fourth place, against all primetime programming, for television series which are watched by viewers with income above $100,000. Following Fey's popular impressions of Alaskan governor Sarah Palin on Saturday Night Live, the third-season premiere was seen by 8.5 million viewers, making it the highest-viewed episode in the series. The premiere earned a 4.1 preliminary adults 18–49 rating, an increase of 21% from the second-season premiere.

=== Similarities to other media ===
30 Rock was one of two shows that debuted on the 2006–07 NBC lineup that revolved around the off-camera happenings of a Saturday Night Live-analogue sketch comedy series. Studio 60 on the Sunset Strip, a comedy-drama created by Aaron Sorkin, was the other. Similarities between the two led to speculation that only one of them would be picked up. Kevin Reilly, then president of NBC Entertainment, was supportive of Fey, describing the situation as a "high-class problem":

I just can't imagine the audience would look at both shows, choose one and cancel the other out. In some ways, why is it any different than when there have been three or four cop shows on any schedule, or Scrubs and ER, which are tonally very different?

Sorkin sent Fey flowers after NBC announced it would pick up both series, and wished her luck with 30 Rock. Studio 60 was ultimately canceled after one season and 30 Rock was renewed for a second. Though 30 Rock's first-season ratings proved lackluster and were lower than those of Studio 60, Studio 60 was more expensive to produce.

Numerous 30 Rock episodes have briefly parodied Studio 60, including the fifth season episode "Plan B", which includes Sorkin appearing as himself as Liz is attempting to get a new job at NBC's The Sing-Off. Sorkin explains to Liz that he, too, is having trouble finding work writing for television, despite having written such works as The West Wing, A Few Good Men, and The Social Network. Liz adds Studio 60 to that list, but Sorkin tells her to "shut up". The two of them also engage in Sorkin's signature "Walk and Talk" during their exchange, leading them to where they started the conversation, which Liz points out.

Other shows that critics have compared 30 Rock to include The Mary Tyler Moore Show, with parallels drawn between the relationship of Liz and Jack and that of Mary Richards and Lou Grant. It has also been compared to That Girl. Like That Girl and Mary Tyler Moore, 30 Rock is a sitcom centering on an unmarried, brunette career woman living in a big city where she works in the television industry. That Girl was parodied in the opening segment of 30 Rock's pilot.

== Aborted potential spin-off and removed episodes ==
In 2019, Tina Fey and 30 Rock co-showrunner Robert Carlock received a straight-to-series order for an untitled comedy series from NBC. The original script was meant to see Baldwin reprise Jack Donaghy's role and was to follow his political career as mayor of New York following the series finale. Baldwin was in negotiations for a year to star in the project before dropping out. Ted Danson replaced Baldwin as the lead character, and the series setting was changed to Los Angeles to accommodate Danson's wish to remain in his home city. Following this, the series (later titled Mr. Mayor) was rewritten to lose any connections to 30 Rock.

On June 22, 2020, at the request of Fey and Carlock, NBC announced that four episodes of the series that depict actors in blackface would be removed from streaming services and taken off circulation on TV. Fey stated: "As we strive to do the work and do better in regards to race in America, we believe that these episodes featuring actors in race-changing makeup are best taken out of circulation. I understand now that 'intent' is not a free pass for white people to use these images. I apologize for pain they have caused." The episodes that were removed were the third season episode "Believe in the Stars", the fifth season episodes "Christmas Attack Zone" and "Live Show", all of which featured Jenna in blackface, and the sixth season episode "Live from Studio 6H", which featured guest star Jon Hamm in blackface. The decision to remove the episodes came amid protests over the murder of George Floyd.

== Reunion specials ==
On June 16, 2020, NBC announced that it would produce a one-off, hour-long reunion special, which premiered on July 16. The hour-long special aired with no commercial interruptions, but featured promotions and tie-ins for programs airing across NBCUniversal properties (including its new streaming platform Peacock) for the 2020–21 television season — effectively acting as a substitute for a physical upfronts presentation due to the COVID-19 pandemic. The same day, an accompanying online summit for media and advertisers included an early screening of the special, while the special became available on Peacock and aired on other NBCUniversal cable networks on July 17. A number of major NBC affiliate groups declined to air the special, citing concerns over its aim to be a vehicle for promoting NBCUniversal's cable networks and Peacock.

On October 11, 2026, the cast of 30 Rock had a "one-night-only, never-to-be-televised cast reunion" at Radio City Music Hall in New York City. This event featured all principal actors including Tina Fey, Alec Baldwin, Tracy Morgan, Jane Krakowski, Jack McBrayer, and also special guests such as Tom Hanks, Jon Hamm, Lin-Manuel Miranda, and Conan O'Brien. The event was organized to raise money for the Boys and Girls Clubs of Harlem, said by Fey to be a reference to an episode of the show where Tracy Jordan struggles to film a commercial for the same organization. Fey revealed that the reunion was McBrayer's idea, saying he was the one to suggest a reunion, but that he "probably meant a cast dinner. But I’m not a good listener, so here we are".

== Syndication and home media ==
It was announced in 2009 that off-network syndication rights for 30 Rock had been acquired by Comedy Central and WGN America for about $800,000 an episode. The show began airing on the two networks as well as in local broadcast syndication in September 2011.

Universal Studios Home Entertainment released all seven seasons on DVD in addition to releasing a complete collection bundle. The complete DVD and Blu-ray sets were released through Mill Creek Entertainment on April 21, 2020.

=== Episode downloads and online streaming ===
Episodes of 30 Rock are available to download for a per-episode fee, to American residents only, via Amazon Video, Apple's iTunes Store, Google Play. Back when the show was still running, it was also available on the now-defunct "NBC Direct" service. In addition to paid downloads, all seven seasons can be streamed on Hulu in the United States with a paid subscription, having moved there from Netflix on October 1, 2017, under a new agreement with NBCUniversal Television and New Media Distribution. The previous Netflix deal had existed for much of the show's run, and lasted several years after.

All 7 seasons of 30 Rock (barring the aforementioned four episodes removed from circulation) returned to Netflix on August 1, 2021, and were removed from the service on July 31, 2022, and the series moved to Peacock while remaining on Hulu.

As of May 1, 2026, 30 Rock is streaming on Netflix across various regions outside of the United States.

=== DVD releases ===
Season	Region 1	Region 2	Region 4	Discs	Extras
One	September 4, 2007	March 17, 2008	April 30, 2008	3	Episode commentaries, outtakes and deleted scenes (region 1 only)
Two	October 7, 2008	May 25, 2009	January 8, 2009	2	Episode commentaries, outtakes, deleted scenes, the table read for the episode "Cooter", 30 Rock Live at the UCB Theatre, a behind-the-scenes look at an episode of Saturday Night Live which was hosted by Tina Fey, and the Academy of Television Arts & Sciences Presents: An Evening With 30 Rock
Three	September 22, 2009	April 5, 2010	November 11, 2009	3	Episode commentaries, outtakes, deleted scenes, the table read for the episode "Kidney Now!", behind-the-scenes with the Muppets, 1-900-OKFACE, The Making of "He Needs a Kidney", photo gallery
Four	September 21, 2010	February 14, 2011	November 3, 2010	3	Episode commentaries, deleted scenes, behind-the-scenes, extended episodes, Ace of Cakes episode, "Tennis Night in America" music video, photo gallery
Five	November 29, 2011	March 12, 2012	November 3, 2011	3	Episode commentaries, deleted scenes, behind-the-scenes of "30 Rock Live"
Six	September 11, 2012	April 15, 2013	November 7, 2012	3	Episode commentaries, deleted scenes, behind-the-scenes of "Live from Studio 6H"
Seven	May 7, 2013	May 5, 2014	November 28, 2013	2	Episode commentaries, deleted scenes, animated webisodes, series finale retrospective
Complete; Collection	January 12, 2014	May 5, 2014	November 28, 2013	20	All features from individual release
