= Kevin Brown (actor) =

American actor

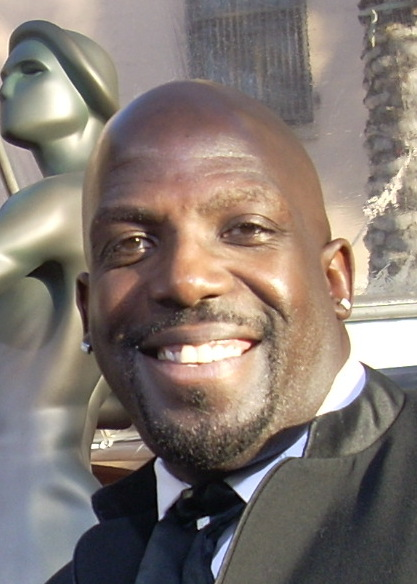
- Brown at the 15th Screen Actors Guild Awards in 2009
- Born: April 4, 1972 (age 54)
- Occupations: Comedian; actor; writer; producer; stunt performer
- Years active: 1991–present

Kevin Brown (born April 4, 1972) is an American comedian and film and television actor, best known for his role on the series 30 Rock as "Dot Com".

Brown also appeared as the lead in Marq Overton's one-man play Die Laughing in 2008 at the Diversity Players of Harlem and as an actor and executive producer of the stage play Box (an off-Broadway play about four Haitian stowaways to America). He co-founded Uptown Comedy Club.

== Filmography ==
Year	Title	Role	Other Notes
1991	The Dog Ate It	Mike	
1994	Wicked Games	(unknown)	
1994	Cracking Up	Dack	
1995	Of Love & Betrayal	Fed-Ex Delivery Man	
1995	Tall Tale	Bettor #1	
1996	Second Noah	Herbie	1 episode
1998	Broken Vessels	Drug Dealer	
2003	Vicious	Marine #1	
2004	Confessions of a Teenage Drama Queen	Doorman	
2005	Get Rich or Die Tryin'	Pelham Hall Security Guard	
2006	Last Comic Standing	Guest Comedian	1 episode
2006	Gingerbreed	Red Carter	
2006	Delirious	Twilight Club Bouncer	(as UPTOWN Kevin Brown)
2006	A Merry Little Christmas	Cleveland Tyrell	
2006	30 Rock	Dot Com	Nominated for Screen Actors Guild Award for Outstanding Performance by an Ensemble in a Comedy Series (2009–2013)
2008	Human Giant	Inmate #2	
2008	Late Night with Conan O'Brien	Special Officer Jordan Mitchell	
2009	Mystery Team	Bouncer	
2009	Royal Pains	Lance	1 episode
2009	Did You Hear About the Morgans?	U.S. Marshall Henderson	
2010	A Kiss for Jed	Second Body Guard	
2010	Under the Influence	Rolles	
2012	Castle	Big Percy Jackson	1 episode
2018	Ocean's 8	Security Guard	
