= List of volleyball video games =

This is a list of volleyball sports video games.

- Volleyball (1972), Magnavox Odyssey; Magnavox
- Volleyball! (1980), Magnavox Odyssey²; Magnavox
- RealSports Volleyball (1982), Atari 2600; Atari, Inc.
- Joshi Volleyball / Big Spikers (1983), Arcade; Taito
- Spiker (1986), Arcade; Bally/Sente
- Volleyball (1986), Famicom Disk System, NES; Nintendo
- Volleyball Simulator (1986), Atari ST, IBM PC, Commodore 64, Amiga; Softgold
- Great Volleyball (1987), Master System; Sega
- Arcade Volleyball (1988), IBM PC; COMPUTE!
- Kings of the Beach (1988), NES, IBM PC, Commodore 64; Electronic Arts
- V'Ball (1988), Arcade; Technōs Japan
- Spiker! Super Pro Volleyball (1989), Intellivision; Realtime Associates
- Super Volleyball (1989), Arcade, Genesis/Mega Drive, TurboGrafx 16/PC Engine; V-System
- Super Spike V'Ball (1990), NES; Technos
- Malibu Bikini Volleyball / Seaside Volley (JP) (1990), Atari Lynx, Game Boy; Activision
- Power Spikes (1991), Arcade; Video System
- Venice Beach Volleyball (1991), NES; Idea-Tek
- Sanrio Cup: Pon Pon Volley (1992), NES; Charactersoft
- Hyper V-Ball (1992), SNES; McO'River, Video System
- Dig & Spike Volleyball (1993), SNES; Hudson Soft, Tonkin House
- ESPN Let's Play Beach Volleyball (1994), 3DO Interactive Multiplayer; Intelliplay
- Popeye: Beach Volleyball (1994), Game Gear; Technōs Japan
- Power Spikes II (1994), Arcade, Neo Geo CD; Video System Co.
- Multi Play Volleyball (1994), SNES; Pack-in-Video
- Virtual Volleyball (1995), Sega Saturn; Imagineer
- World Beach Volley (1995), Arcade; Playmark
- World Cup Volley '95 (1995), Arcade; Data East Corporation
- Inazuma Serve da!! Super Beach Volley (1995), SNES; Virgin Interactive Entertainment
- Winning Spike (1997), Arcade; Konami
- Waku Waku Volley (1998), PlayStation; (2003), PlayStation 2
- Power Spike Pro Beach Volleyball Beach 'n Ball (EU) (2000), Game Boy Color, PlayStation, IBM PC; Infogrames
- Beach Volleyball: Sea, smash and sun (2001), IBM PC; Carapace
- Klonoa Beach Volleyball (2002), PlayStation; Namco
- Beach Spikers (2002), Arcade / GameCube; Sega
- Outlaw Volleyball (2003), Xbox; (2005), PlayStation 2; Simon & Schuster Interactive
- Summer Heat Beach Volleyball (2003), PlayStation 2; Acclaim Entertainment
- Dead or Alive Xtreme Beach Volleyball (2003), Xbox; Tecmo
- Hamtaro: Ham-Ham Games (2004), Game Boy Advance; AlphaDream Corporation
- Tom Goes to the Mayor: Idea Volleyball (2004), Windows Web-Based; Adult Swim Games
- International Volleyball 2004 (2006), Windows; AddGames Italia
- Dead or Alive Xtreme 2 (2006), Xbox 360; Tecmo
- The Sports Daishuugou - Yakyuu-Tennis-Volleyball-Futsal-Golf (2007), Nintendo DS; Tamsoft
- Big Beach Sports (2008), Wii; THQ
- Women's Volleyball Championship / FIVB Volleyball World Cup: Venus Evolution (JP) (2008), PlayStation 2; Agetec
- Boomerang Sports Vôlei (2009), Zeebo; Tectoy
- International Volleyball 2009 (2009), Windows;
- Dead or Alive Paradise (2010), PlayStation Portable; Tecmo
- Mario Sports Mix (2010), Wii; Nintendo
- Mario & Sonic at the London 2012 Olympic Games (2011), Nintendo 3DS, Wii; Nintendo
- Okiraku Beach Volley 3D (2012), Nintendo 3DS; Arc System Works
- Mario & Sonic at the Rio 2016 Olympic Games (2016), Nintendo 3DS, Wii U; Nintendo
- Volleyball Unbound - Pro Beach Volleyball (2016), Windows; Great Boolean
- Super Volley Blast (2018), Nintendo Switch, PlayStation 4, Xbox One, Windows
- Mario & Sonic at the Olympic Games Tokyo 2020 (2019), Nintendo Switch; Nintendo
- Spike Volleyball (2019), PlayStation 4, Xbox One, Windows
- The Spike (2020), Windows
- Lactea Volleyball (2020), Windows
- Nintendo Switch Sports (2022), Nintendo Switch; Nintendo
- Spikair Volleyball (2022), Windows
- Beastieball (2024)
- Nintendo Switch Sports Resort (2026), Nintendo Switch 2; Nintendo

== See also ==
- Volleyball
- Sports game
