= Tina Fey filmography =

American actress filmography

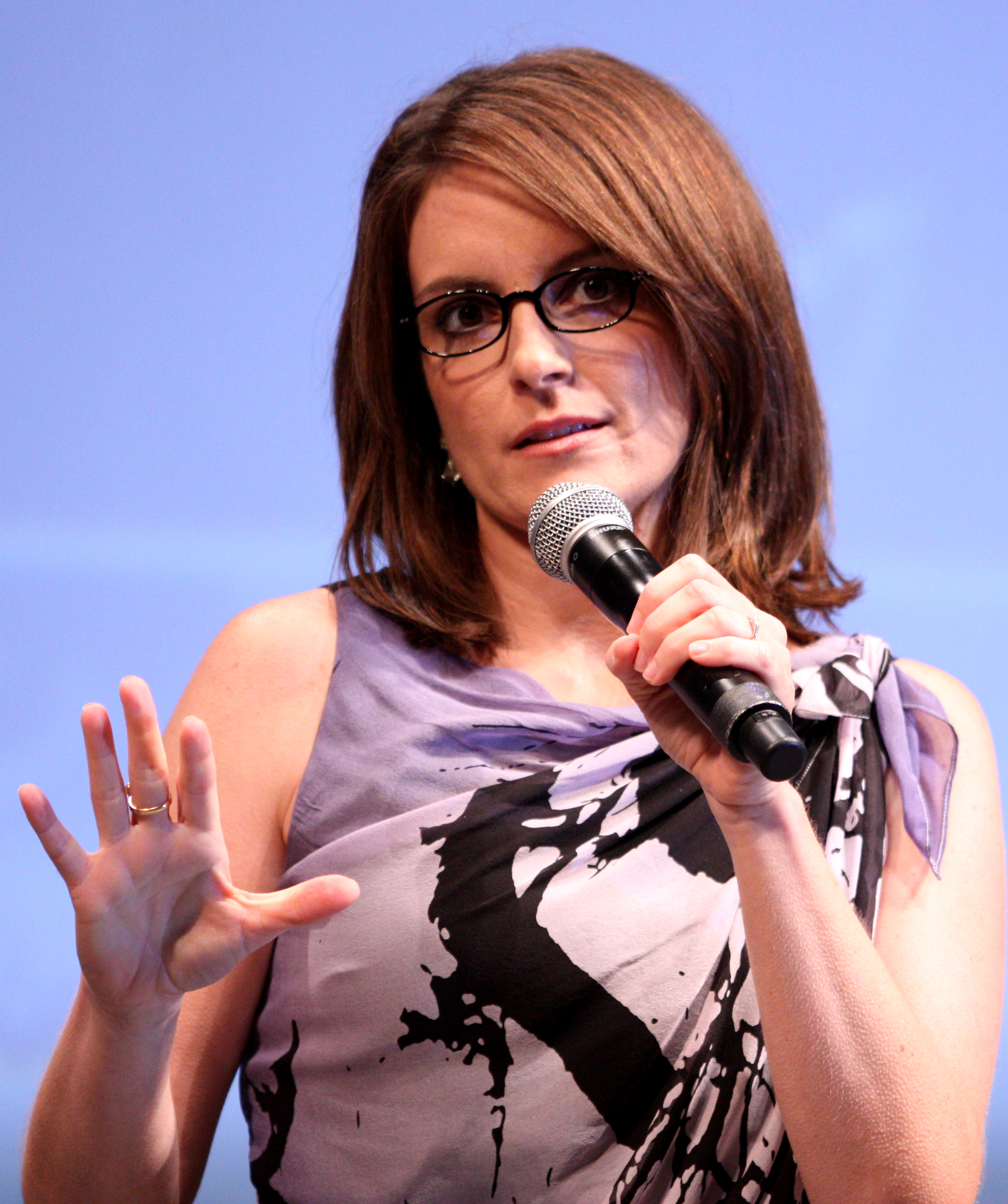
Fey in 2010

The following is the complete filmography of actress, comedian, writer, and producer Tina Fey.

== Film ==
Year	Title	Role	Notes	Ref.
2002	Martin & Orloff	Southern Woman		
2004	Mean Girls	Ms. Sharon Norbury	Also writer and lyricist ("The Mathlete's Rap")	
2006	Artie Lange's Beer League	Front Desk Girl		
2006	Man of the Year	Herself	Cameo	
2007	Aqua Teen Hunger Force Colon Movie Film for Theaters	Giant Burrito (voice)		
2008	Baby Mama	Kate Holbrook		
2008	Ponyo	Lisa (voice)	English dub	
2009	The Invention of Lying	Shelley Bailey		
2010	Date Night	Claire Foster		
2010	Megamind	Roxanne "Roxie" Ritchi (voice)		
2013	Admission	Portia Nathan		
2013	Elaine Stritch: Shoot Me	Herself	Documentary	
2013	Anchorman 2: The Legend Continues	Entertainment Tonight Anchor	Cameo	
2014	Muppets Most Wanted	Nadya		
2014	This Is Where I Leave You	Wendy Altman		
2015	Monkey Kingdom	Narrator (voice)	Documentary	
2015	Sisters	Kate Ellis	Also producer	
2016	Whiskey Tango Foxtrot	Kim Baker	Also producer	
2019	Wine Country	Tammy		
2020	Soul	22 (voice)		
2021	22 vs. Earth	22 (voice)	Short film	
2021	Free Guy	Vacuuming Mom (voice)	Cameo	
2022	Betty White: A Celebration	Herself	Documentary	
2023	Maggie Moore(s)	Rita Grace		
2023	A Haunting in Venice	Ariadne Oliver		
2024	Mean Girls	Ms. Sharon Norbury	Also writer, producer, and songwriter ("Kevin G. Rap")	
2026	Lorne	Herself	Documentary	

Key
†	Denotes films that have not yet been released

== Television ==
Year	Title	Role	Network	Notes	Ref.
1997–2006	Saturday Night Live	Various roles	NBC	130 episodes Also writer	
1999	Upright Citizens Brigade	Kerri Downey	Comedy Central	Episode: "Mogomra vs. the Fart Monster"	
1999	Saturday Night Live 25	None	NBC	Television special	
2001	The Challenge	Herself / Judge	MTV	Episode: "No Laughing Matter"	
2002	The Colin Quinn Show	None	NBC	Writer	
2002	NBC 75th Anniversary Special	None	NBC	Television special	
2004	Soundtracks Live	Grandma Helen	VH1	Television special	
2006–2013, 2020	30 Rock	Liz Lemon	NBC	139 episodes Also creator, writer and executive producer	
2007	Sesame Street	Bookaneer Captain	PBS	Episode: "The Bookaneers"	
2008–2018	Saturday Night Live	Herself (host)	NBC	6 episodes	
2008–2016	Saturday Night Live	Sarah Palin	NBC	7 episodes	
2009	SpongeBob SquarePants	Herself	Nickelodeon	Episode: "SpongeBob's Truth or Square"	
2011	Phineas and Ferb	Annabelle (voice)	Disney Channel	Episode: "Run Candace, Run"	
2012	Betty White's 90th Birthday: A Tribute to America's Golden Girl	Herself	NBC	Television special	
2012	Between Two Ferns with Zach Galifianakis	Herself	Comedy Central	Episode: "A Fairytale of New York"	
2012	iCarly	Herself	Nickelodeon	Episode: "iShock America"	
2013	70th Golden Globe Awards	Herself (co-host)	NBC	Television special	
2013	Conan	Conan O'Brien	TBS	Episode: "Occupy Conan"	
2013	The Simpsons	Mrs. Cantwell (voice)	Fox	Episode: "Black Eyed, Please"	
2013	The Awesomes	The Advocate (voice)	Hulu	Episode: "Pilot, Part 2"	
2014	71st Golden Globe Awards	Herself (co-host)	NBC	Television special	
2014	Cabot College	None	Fox	Pilot; Creator and executive producer	
2014	Comedians in Cars Getting Coffee	Herself (guest)	Netflix	Episode: "Feces Are My Purview"	
2014	Don Rickles: One Night Only	Herself	Spike	Television special	
2014	Saving My Tomorrow	Herself	HBO	Episode: "Part 1"	
2015	72nd Golden Globe Awards	Herself (co-host)	NBC	Television special	
2015	Family Fortune	None	ABC	Pilot; Executive producer	
2015	Inside Amy Schumer	Herself	Comedy Central	Episode: "Last Fuckable Day"	
2015	Saturday Night Live 40th Anniversary Special	Herself	NBC	Television special Also writer	
2015–2020	Unbreakable Kimmy Schmidt	Marcia / Andrea Bayden	Netflix	7 episodes Also co-creator, writer and executive producer	
2016	Maya & Marty	Various roles	NBC	Episode: "Steve Martin & Tina Fey"	
2016	Difficult People	Herself	Hulu	Episode: "Unplugged"	
2016	The Kicker	None	CBS	Pilot; Executive producer	
2017	The Carol Burnett 50th Anniversary Special	Herself	NBC	Television special	
2017	The Sackett Sisters	None	NBC	Pilot; Executive producer	
2017–2018	Great News	Diana St. Tropez	NBC	5 episodes Also writer and executive producer	
2018	My Next Guest Needs No Introduction	Herself (guest)	Netflix	Episode: "It's Just Landmine Hopscotch"	
2019	Modern Love	Sarah	Amazon Prime Video	2 episodes	
2020	Mapleworth Murders	Martha Tweenis	Quibi	Episode: "The Case of the Case of Wine: Part I"	
2020	One Night Only: The Best of Broadway	Herself (host)	NBC	Television special	
2021	78th Golden Globe Awards	Herself (co-host)	NBC	Television special	
2021–2022	Mr. Mayor	None	NBC	Co-creator, writer and executive producer	
2021–2024	Girls5eva	Dolly Parton	Peacock / Netflix	Episode: "Carma"; Also executive producer	
2021–2025	Only Murders in the Building	Cinda Canning	Hulu	10 episodes	
2022–2024	Bob's Burgers	Miss Bisselbender (voice)	Fox	2 episodes	
2023	Carol Burnett: 90 Years of Laughter + Love	Herself	NBC	Television special	
2023–2024	Mulligan	Dr. Farrah Braun (voice)	Netflix	20 episodes Also executive producer	
2025	Saturday Night Live 50th Anniversary Special	Herself	NBC	Television special Also writer	
2025	Grimsburg	Herself (voice)	Fox	Episode: "CrimeCon"	
2025–present	The Four Seasons	Kate	Netflix	16 episodes Also co-creator, writer, director and executive producer	
2026	The Fall and Rise of Reggie Dinkins	None	NBC	Executive producer	
2026	Saturday Night Live UK	Herself (host)	Sky One	Episode: "Tina Fey / Wet Leg"	

Key
†	Denotes television productions that have not yet been released

== Video games ==
List of video game roles
Year	Title	Role	Notes	Ref.
1997	Medieval Madness	Princess	Pinball game	
1999	Sabrina The Teenage Witch: Brat Attack	Various		
1999	Deer Avenger 2: Deer in the City	Various		

== Theatre ==
List of stage performances
Year	Title	Role	Notes	Ref.
2000	Dratch & Fey	Various	Off-Broadway	
2017	Mean Girls	None	D.C. (2017); Broadway (2018); playwright	

Fey also performed at The Second City, both touring and then on the main stage from 1992 to 1997, as well as at ImprovOlympic.
