= List of awards and nominations received by Tina Fey =

Tina Fey awards and nominations
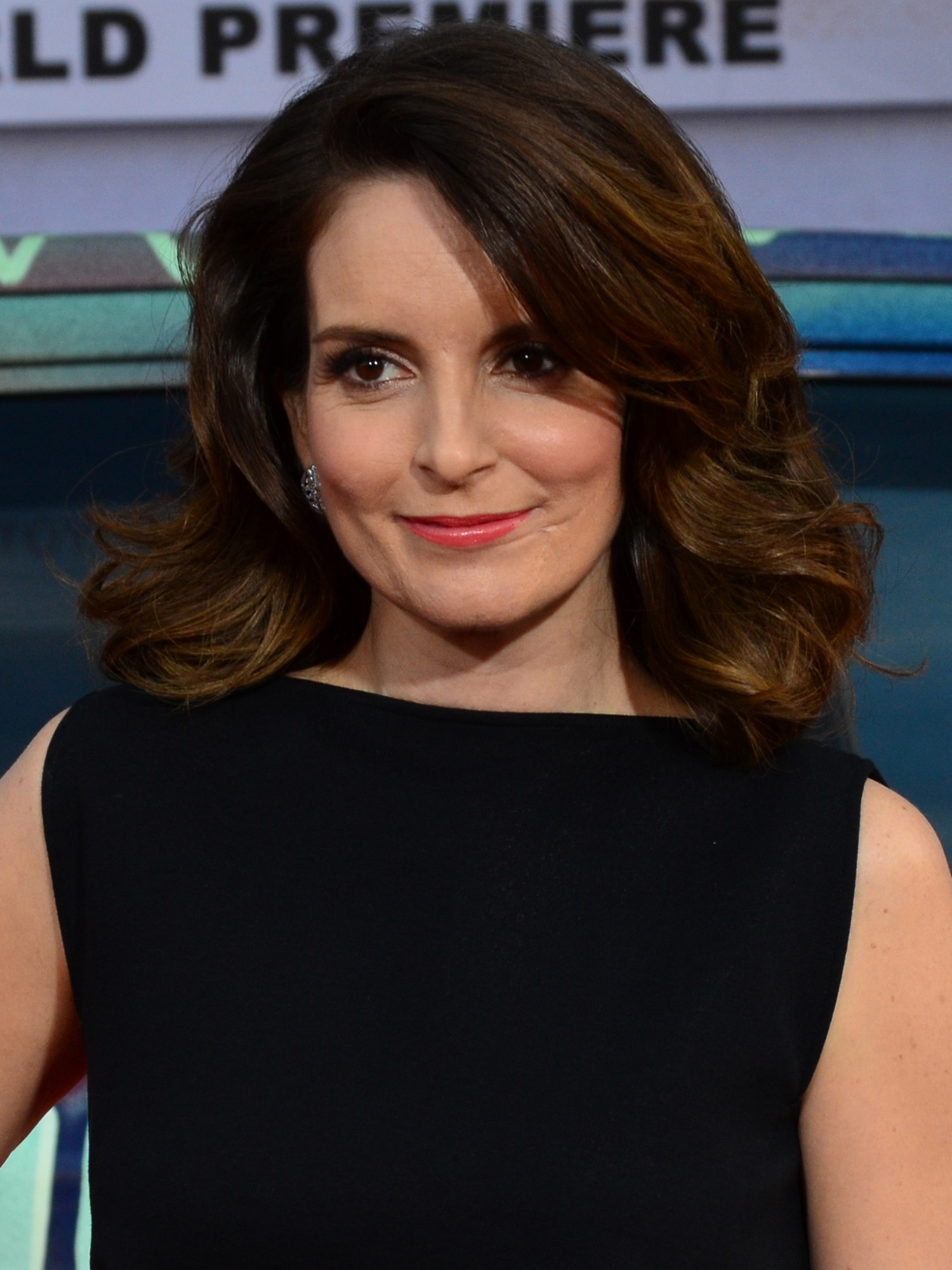
- Fey in 2014
Awards and nominations
Award	Wins	Nominations
Critics' Choice	2	3
Emmy Awards	10	45
Golden Globes	2	6
Grammy Awards	0	1
PGA Awards	3	7
SAG Awards	5	14
Tony Awards	0	1
WGA Awards	7	25

Totals (Note: Certain award groups do not simply award one winner. They acknowledge several different recipients, have runners-up, and have third place. Since this is a specific recognition and is different from losing an award, runner-up mentions are considered wins in this award tally. For simplification and to avoid errors, each award in this list has been presumed to have had a prior nomination.)
- Wins: 40
- Nominations: 149

Tina Fey is an American actress, comedian, writer, and producer. Throughout her career, Fey has received numerous accolades including ten Primetime Emmy Awards, two Golden Globe Awards, two Critics' Choice Awards, five Screen Actors Guild Awards, three Producers Guild of America Awards and seven Writers Guild of America Awards as well as nominations for a Grammy Award and a Tony Award.

She started her career as a head writer and cast member on the NBC sketch series Saturday Night Live (1997–2006). As a writer for SNL she won the Primetime Emmy Award for Outstanding Writing for a Variety Series in 2002. She won the Primetime Emmy Award for Outstanding Guest Actress in a Comedy Series twice, her first win for portraying Sarah Palin in 2009, and her second win for co-hosting with Amy Poehler in 2016. She gained acclaim as a writer, producer and actress on the NBC sitcom 30 Rock (2006–2013) where she portrayed Liz Lemon winning the Primetime Emmy Award, two Golden Globe Awards, and four Screen Actors Guild Awards. The series won three Primetime Emmy Awards for Outstanding Comedy Series and the Primetime Emmy Award for Outstanding Writing for a Comedy Series twice for "Cooter" in 2008 and "Last Lunch" in 2013.

Fey then created the Netflix sitcom Unbreakable Kimmy Schmidt (2015–2019) which earned her four nominations for the Primetime Emmy Award for Outstanding Comedy Series. During this time she earned notoriety for co-hosting the Golden Globe Awards four times in the years 2013, 2014, 2015, and 2021, with Amy Poehler. She wrote her biography Bossypants in 2011 which was turned into an audiobook and was nominated for the Grammy Award for Best Spoken Word Album. On film, she starred in numerous comedy films such as Baby Mama (2008), Date Night (2010), and Sisters (2015), the later of which earned Fey a nomination for the Critics' Choice Movie Award for Best Actress in a Comedy. She voiced role in the Pixar animated film Soul (2020), which earned her a nomination for a Critics' Choice Super Award for Best Voice Actress in an Animated Movie.

On stage, she wrote the book for the Broadway musical Mean Girls (2018) which was adapted from Fey's 2004 movie of the same name of which she acted in. The musical earned critical acclaim as well as the Drama Desk Award for Outstanding Book of a Musical and the Outer Critics Circle Awards for Best Book of a Musical and a nomination for the Tony Award for Best Book of a Musical. The 2004 film earned her a nomination for the Writers Guild of America Award for Best Adapted Screenplay. Fey wrote the 2024 film adaptation of the musical.

Fey was listed on the Time Magazine 100 most influential people in the world twice in 2007 and 2009. She received the AP Entertainer of the Year award from the Associated Press in 2008. Fey was awarded the Mark Twain Prize for American Humor in 2010, becoming the youngest-ever recipient of the award. The same year it was announced that she would receive a star on the Hollywood Walk of Fame. In 2018, Fey was the recipient of the Herb Sargent Award for Comedy Excellence from the Writers Guild of America together with frequent collaborator Robert Carlock.

== Major associations ==
=== Critics' Choice Awards ===
Year	Category	Nominated work	Result	Ref.
Critics' Choice Movie Awards
2016	Best Actress in a Comedy	Sisters	Nominated	
Critics' Choice Super Awards
2021	Best Voice Actress in an Animated Movie	Soul	Won	
Critics' Choice Television Awards
2011	Best Actress in a Comedy Series	30 Rock	Won	

=== Emmy Awards ===
Year	Category	Nominated work	Result	Ref.
Primetime Emmy Awards
2001	Outstanding Writing for a Variety Series	Saturday Night Live	Nominated	
2002	Outstanding Writing for a Variety Series	Saturday Night Live	Won	
2003	Outstanding Writing for a Variety Series	Saturday Night Live	Nominated	
2007	Outstanding Comedy Series	30 Rock (Season 1)	Won	
2007	Outstanding Lead Actress in a Comedy Series	30 Rock (episode: "Up All Night")	Nominated	
2007	Outstanding Writing for a Comedy Series	30 Rock (episode: "Tracy Does Conan")	Nominated	
2008	Outstanding Comedy Series	30 Rock (Season 2)	Won	
2008	Outstanding Lead Actress in a Comedy Series	30 Rock (episode: "Sandwich Day")	Won	
2008	Outstanding Writing for a Comedy Series	30 Rock (episode: "Cooter")	Won	
2008	Outstanding Performance in a Variety Program	Saturday Night Live	Nominated	
2009	Outstanding Comedy Series	30 Rock (Season 3)	Won	
2009	Outstanding Lead Actress in a Comedy Series	30 Rock (episode: "Reunion")	Nominated	
2009	Outstanding Guest Actress in a Comedy Series	Saturday Night Live (episode: "SNL Presidential Bash 2008")	Won	
2010	Outstanding Comedy Series	30 Rock (Season 4)	Nominated	
2010	Outstanding Lead Actress in a Comedy Series	30 Rock (episode: "Dealbreakers Talk Show No. 0001")	Nominated	
2010	Outstanding Writing for a Comedy Series	30 Rock (episode: "Lee Marvin vs. Derek Jeter")	Nominated	
2010	Outstanding Guest Actress in a Comedy Series	Saturday Night Live (episode: "Tina Fey/Justin Bieber")	Nominated	
2011	Outstanding Comedy Series	30 Rock (Season 5)	Nominated	
2011	Outstanding Lead Actress in a Comedy Series	30 Rock (episode: "Double-Edged Sword")	Nominated	
2011	Outstanding Guest Actress in a Comedy Series	Saturday Night Live (episode: "Tina Fey/Ellie Goulding")	Nominated	
2012	Outstanding Comedy Series	30 Rock (Season 6)	Nominated	
2012	Outstanding Lead Actress in a Comedy Series	30 Rock (episode: "The Tuxedo Begins")	Nominated	
2012	Outstanding Short-Format Nonfiction Programs	30 Rock: Ask Tina	Nominated	
2013	Outstanding Comedy Series	30 Rock (Season 7)	Nominated	
2013	Outstanding Lead Actress in a Comedy Series	30 Rock (episode: "Hogcock!" + "Last Lunch")	Nominated	
2013	Outstanding Writing for a Comedy Series	30 Rock (episode: "Last Lunch")	Won	
2013	Outstanding Original Music and Lyrics	30 Rock (song: "Rural Juror")	Nominated	
2013	Outstanding Short-Format Programs	30 Rock: The Webisodes	Nominated	
2013	Outstanding Short-Format Nonfiction Programs	30 Rock: The Final Season	Nominated	
2013	Outstanding Writing for a Variety Special	70th Golden Globe Awards	Nominated	
2014	Outstanding Guest Actress in a Comedy Series	Saturday Night Live (episode: "Tina Fey/Arcade Fire")	Nominated	
2014	Outstanding Special Class Program	71st Golden Globe Awards	Nominated	
2014	Outstanding Writing for a Variety Special	71st Golden Globe Awards	Nominated	
2015	Outstanding Comedy Series	Unbreakable Kimmy Schmidt (Season 1)	Nominated	
2015	Outstanding Guest Actress in a Comedy Series	Unbreakable Kimmy Schmidt (episode: "Kimmy Goes to Jail!")	Nominated	
2015	Outstanding Special Class Program	72nd Golden Globe Awards	Nominated	
2015	Outstanding Writing for a Variety Special	72nd Golden Globe Awards	Nominated	
2015	Outstanding Writing for a Variety Special	Saturday Night Live 40th Anniversary Special	Nominated	
2016	Outstanding Comedy Series	Unbreakable Kimmy Schmidt (Season 2)	Nominated	
2016	Outstanding Guest Actress in a Comedy Series	Saturday Night Live (Episode: "Tina Fey & Amy Poehler/Bruce Springsteen")	Won	
2017	Outstanding Comedy Series	Unbreakable Kimmy Schmidt (Season 3)	Nominated	
2017	Outstanding Original Music and Lyrics	Unbreakable Kimmy Schmidt (song: "Hell No")	Nominated	
2018	Outstanding Comedy Series	Unbreakable Kimmy Schmidt (Season 4)	Nominated	
2018	Outstanding Guest Actress in a Comedy Series	Saturday Night Live (episode: "Tina Fey/Nicki Minaj")	Nominated	
2020	Outstanding Television Movie	Unbreakable Kimmy Schmidt: Kimmy vs. The Reverend	Nominated	
2025	Outstanding Writing for a Variety Special	SNL50: The Anniversary Special	Won	

=== Golden Globe Awards ===
Year	Category	Nominated work	Result	Ref.
2008	Best Actress – Television Series Musical or Comedy	30 Rock (season 2)	Won	
2009	Best Actress – Television Series Musical or Comedy	30 Rock (season 3)	Won	
2010	Best Actress – Television Series Musical or Comedy	30 Rock (season 4)	Nominated	
2011	Best Actress – Television Series Musical or Comedy	30 Rock (season 5)	Nominated	
2012	Best Actress – Television Series Musical or Comedy	30 Rock (season 6)	Nominated	
2013	Best Actress – Television Series Musical or Comedy	30 Rock (season 7)	Nominated	

=== Grammy Awards ===
Year	Category	Nominated work	Result	Ref.
2012	Best Spoken Word Album	Bossypants	Nominated	

=== Screen Actors Guild Awards ===
Year	Category	Nominated work	Result	Ref.
2008	Outstanding Ensemble in a Comedy Series	30 Rock (season 1)	Nominated	
2008	Outstanding Female Actor in a Comedy Series	30 Rock (season 1)	Won	
2009	Outstanding Ensemble in a Comedy Series	30 Rock (season 2)	Won	
2009	Outstanding Female Actor in a Comedy Series	30 Rock (season 2)	Won	
2010	Outstanding Ensemble in a Comedy Series	30 Rock (season 3)	Nominated	
2010	Outstanding Female Actor in a Comedy Series	30 Rock (season 3)	Won	
2011	Outstanding Ensemble in a Comedy Series	30 Rock (season 4)	Nominated	
2011	Outstanding Female Actor in a Comedy Series	30 Rock (season 4)	Nominated	
2012	Outstanding Ensemble in a Comedy Series	30 Rock (season 5)	Nominated	
2012	Outstanding Female Actor in a Comedy Series	30 Rock (season 5)	Nominated	
2013	Outstanding Ensemble in a Comedy Series	30 Rock (season 6)	Nominated	
2013	Outstanding Female Actor in a Comedy Series	30 Rock (season 6)	Won	
2014	Outstanding Ensemble in a Comedy Series	30 Rock (season 7)	Nominated	
2014	Outstanding Female Actor in a Comedy Series	30 Rock (season 7)	Nominated	

=== Tony Awards ===
Year	Category	Nominated work	Result	Ref.
2018	Best Book of a Musical	Mean Girls	Nominated	

== Miscellaneous awards ==
Organizations	Year	Category	Work	Result	Ref.
Alliance of Women Film Journalists	2021	Best Animated Female	Soul	Won	
Drama Desk Awards	2018	Outstanding Book of a Musical	Mean Girls	Won	
Gay and Lesbian Entertainment Critics Association	2010	Savage Wit of the Year	30 Rock	Nominated	
Gay and Lesbian Entertainment Critics Association	2011	Wilde Wit of the Year	30 Rock	Nominated	
Golden Nymph Award	2008	Outstanding Actress in a Comedy Series	30 Rock	Nominated	
Golden Nymph Award	2009	Outstanding Actress in a Comedy Series	30 Rock	Nominated	
Golden Nymph Award	2010	Outstanding Actress in a Comedy Series	30 Rock	Nominated	
Golden Nymph Award	2011	Outstanding Actress in a Comedy Series	30 Rock	Nominated	
Golden Nymph Award	2012	Outstanding Actress in a Comedy Series	30 Rock	Won	
Golden Nymph Award	2012	Outstanding International Producer (Comedy Series)	30 Rock	Nominated	
Golden Nymph Award	2013	Outstanding Actress in a Comedy Series	30 Rock	Won	
Gotham Awards	2015	Breakthrough Series – Long Form	Unbreakable Kimmy Schmidt	Nominated	
Gracie Awards	2007	Outstanding Female Lead – Comedy Series	30 Rock	Won	
Gracie Awards	2008	Outstanding Female Lead – Comedy Series	30 Rock	Won	
Gracie Awards	2016	Female Actor in a Featured or Guest Role	Unbreakable Kimmy Schmidt	Won	
Hollywood Critics Association	2021	Best Animated or VFX Performance	Soul	Nominated	
MTV Movie Awards	2014	Best Cameo	Anchorman 2: The Legend Continues	Nominated	
MTV Movie Awards	2014	Best Fight	Anchorman 2: The Legend Continues	Nominated	
Muse Awards	2005	Outstanding Woman in Film and Television	Herself	Won	
NewNowNext Awards	2008	'Cause You're Hot	Herself	Won	
Nickelodeon Kids' Choice Awards	2021	Favorite Voice from an Animated Movie	Soul	Nominated	
Outer Critics Circle Awards	2018	Outstanding Book of a Musical (Broadway or Off-Broadway)	Mean Girls	Won	
People's Choice Awards	2005	Favorite Funny Female Star	Herself	Nominated	
People's Choice Awards	2009	Favorite Funny Female Star	Herself	Won	
People's Choice Awards	2009	Favorite On Screen Match-Up (with Amy Poehler)	Baby Mama	Nominated	
People's Choice Awards	2011	Favorite Comedic Star	Herself	Nominated	
People's Choice Awards	2011	Favorite On-Screen Team (with Steve Carell)	Date Night	Nominated	
People's Choice Awards	2011	Favorite TV Comedy Actress	Herself	Nominated	
People's Choice Awards	2012	Favorite TV Comedy Actress	Herself	Nominated	
People's Choice Awards	2015	Favorite Comedic Movie Actress	Herself	Nominated	
Producers Guild of America Awards	2007	Outstanding Producer of Episodic Comedy	30 Rock	Won	
Producers Guild of America Awards	2009	Outstanding Producer of Episodic Comedy	30 Rock	Won	
Producers Guild of America Awards	2010	Outstanding Producer of Episodic Comedy	30 Rock	Won	
Producers Guild of America Awards	2011	Outstanding Producer of Episodic Comedy	30 Rock	Nominated	
Producers Guild of America Awards	2012	Outstanding Producer of Episodic Comedy	30 Rock	Nominated	
Producers Guild of America Awards	2013	Outstanding Producer of Episodic Comedy	30 Rock	Nominated	
Producers Guild of America Awards	2014	Outstanding Producer of Episodic Comedy	30 Rock	Nominated	
Satellite Awards	2007	Best Actress in a Comedy Series	30 Rock	Nominated	
Satellite Awards	2008	Best Actress in a Comedy Series	30 Rock	Nominated	
Satellite Awards	2009	Best Actress in a Comedy Series	30 Rock	Nominated	
Satellite Awards	2010	Best Actress in a Comedy Series	30 Rock	Nominated	
Teen Choice Awards	2004	Choice Comedian	Herself	Nominated	
Teen Choice Awards	2005	Choice Comedian	Herself	Nominated	
Teen Choice Awards	2008	Choice TV Actress – Comedy	30 Rock	Nominated	
Teen Choice Awards	2010	Choice Movie Actress – Comedy	Date Night	Won	
Teen Choice Awards	2010	Choice Movie: Dance (with Steve Carell)	Date Night	Nominated	
Television Critics Association Awards	2007	Individual Achievement in Comedy	30 Rock	Nominated	
Television Critics Association Awards	2008	Individual Achievement in Comedy	30 Rock	Won	
Television Critics Association Awards	2009	Individual Achievement in Comedy	30 Rock	Nominated	
Washington D.C. Area Film Critics Association	2021	Best Voice Performance	Soul	Nominated	
Writers Guild of America Awards	2001	Comedy/Variety – Music, Awards, Tributes – Specials	Saturday Night Live - 25th Anniversary	Won	
Writers Guild of America Awards	2001	Comedy/Variety (Including Talk) – Series	Saturday Night Live	Nominated	
Writers Guild of America Awards	2002	Comedy/Variety (Including Talk) – Series	Saturday Night Live	Nominated	
Writers Guild of America Awards	2003	Comedy/Variety (Including Talk) – Series	Saturday Night Live	Nominated	
Writers Guild of America Awards	2003	Comedy/Variety – Music, Awards, Tributes – Specials	NBC 75th Anniversary Special	Nominated	
Writers Guild of America Awards	2004	Best Adapted Screenplay	Mean Girls	Nominated	
Writers Guild of America Awards	2007	Comedy/Variety (Including Talk) – Series	Saturday Night Live	Won	
Writers Guild of America Awards	2007	New Series	30 Rock	Nominated	
Writers Guild of America Awards	2007	Comedy Series	30 Rock	Nominated	
Writers Guild of America Awards	2008	Comedy Series	30 Rock	Won	
Writers Guild of America Awards	2009	Comedy Series	30 Rock	Won	
Writers Guild of America Awards	2009	Episodic Comedy	30 Rock (episode: "Cooter")	Nominated	
Writers Guild of America Awards	2010	Comedy Series	30 Rock	Won	
Writers Guild of America Awards	2011	Comedy Series	30 Rock	Nominated	
Writers Guild of America Awards	2012	Comedy Series	30 Rock	Nominated	
Writers Guild of America Awards	2013	Comedy Series	30 Rock	Nominated	
Writers Guild of America Awards	2014	Comedy Series	30 Rock	Nominated	
Writers Guild of America Awards	2015	Comedy/Variety – Music, Awards, Tributes – Specials	71st Golden Globe Awards	Won	
Writers Guild of America Awards	2016	Comedy/Variety – Music, Awards, Tributes – Specials	Saturday Night Live 40th Anniversary Special	Nominated	
Writers Guild of America Awards	2016	New Series	Unbreakable Kimmy Schmidt	Nominated	
Writers Guild of America Awards	2016	Comedy Series	Unbreakable Kimmy Schmidt	Nominated	
Writers Guild of America Awards	2017	Comedy Series	Unbreakable Kimmy Schmidt	Nominated	
Writers Guild of America Awards	2017	Episodic Comedy	Unbreakable Kimmy Schmidt	Nominated	
Writers Guild of America Awards	2017	Saturday Night Live	Comedy/Variety – Sketch Series	Won	
Writers Guild of America Awards	2021	Comedy/Variety – Specials	30 Rock: A One-Time Special	Nominated	

== Honorary awards ==
Organizations	Year	Award	Result	Ref.
Time Magazine	2007	Listed on Time 100 most influential people in the world	Honored	
Associated Press	2008	AP Entertainer of the Year	Honored	
Time Magazine	2009	Listed on Time 100 most influential people in the world	Honored	
John F. Kennedy Center for the Performing Arts	2010	Mark Twain Prize for American Humor (Note: Named after Mark Twain, it is presented to individuals who have "had an impact on American society in ways similar to" Twain. In 2010, at age 40, Fey became the youngest recipient of the award.)	Honored	
Hollywood Walk of Fame	2010	Motion Picture Star	Honored	
Writers Guild of America	2018	Herb Sargent Award for Comedy Excellence (Note: With Robert Carlock)	Honored	
