= World Collection =

Series of Japanese releases for original Xbox games

World Collection is a series of Japanese releases for original Xbox games published by Microsoft, featuring select overseas (North American and European) titles, released at a reduced price compared to normal releases. Titles in this series retain their original overseas cover artwork with a "World Collection" border, and are left entirely in English, with a Japanese-language manual. The series was launched in October 2003, with regular releases every 2-3 months until August 2005.

English title	Japanese Release Date	Original Publisher
X-Men Legends	January 27, 2005	Activision
Rocky: Legends	January 27, 2005	Ubisoft
Dead Man's Hand	September 2, 2004	Atari
Shrek 2	December 16, 2004	Activision
Rapala Pro Fishing	August 31, 2004	Activision
Wakeboarding Unleashed featuring Shaun Murray	December 25, 2003	Activision
Outlaw Volleyball	October 23, 2003	Simon & Schuster Interactive
Buffy the Vampire Slayer: Chaos Bleeds	December 25, 2003	Vivendi Universal Games
Star Wars Jedi Knight: Jedi Academy	September 2, 2004	LucasArts
The Simpsons: Hit & Run	December 25, 2003	Vivendi Universal Games
Voodoo Vince	July 22, 2004	Microsoft Game Studios
Tony Hawk's Underground	May 20, 2004	Activision
Hunter: The Reckoning – Redeemer	January 22, 2004	Vivendi Universal Games
Magic: The Gathering - Battlegrounds	July 22, 2004	Atari
Metal Arms: Glitch in the System	May 20, 2004	Microsoft Game Studios
NBA Inside Drive 2004	January 22, 2004	Microsoft Game Studios
Links 2004	March 25, 2004	Microsoft Game Studios
Dr. Seuss' The Cat in the Hat	March 25, 2004	Vivendi Universal Games
SWAT: Global Strike Team	December 16, 2004	Vivendi Universal Games
Tao Feng: Fist of the Lotus	October 23, 2003	Microsoft Game Studios
X2: Wolverine's Revenge	July 22, 2004	Activision
Return to Castle Wolfenstein: Tides of War	December 5, 2003	Activision
Inside Pitch 2003	October 23, 2003	Microsoft Game Studios
Atari Anthology	August 4, 2005	Atari
NFL Fever 2004	October 23, 2003	Microsoft Game Studios
Unreal Championship	January 22, 2004	Atari
Outlaw Golf	October 23, 2003	Simon & Schuster
Counter Strike	March 25, 2004	Microsoft Game Studios
