= Super Volleyball =

1989 video game

- Arcade flyer
- Developers: Video System; Micronics (TurboGrafx-16 and Sega Genesis)
- Publishers: JP: Video System; NA: Data East; JP/NA: Video System (Genesis); NA: Sega (Genesis re-release); NA: NEC (TG16)
- Platforms: Arcade, TurboGrafx-16, Sega Genesis
- Release: Arcade: JP: August 1989; NA: September 1989; Sega Genesis: JP: February 1, 1991; NA: 1991
- Genre: Volleyball
- Modes: Single-player, multiplayer

Super Volleyball (Note: Japanese: スーパーバレーボール, Hepburn: Sūpā Barēbōru), released as Super Volley Ball in Japan, is a 1989 volleyball video game developed and published by Video System for arcades. It was released in Japan in August 1989 and in North America by Data East in September 1989. It was ported to the TurboGrafx-16 in 1990 and Sega Genesis in 1991. A sequel, Power Spikes, was released in 1991; another sequel, Power Spikes II, was released in 1994.

Hamster Corporation acquired the rights to the game alongside Video System's portfolio, releasing it as part of their Oretachi Gēsen Zoku series for the PlayStation 2 in 2005, as well as their Arcade Archives series for the Nintendo Switch and PlayStation 4 in August 2022.

== Gameplay ==
Super Volleyball is a realistic rendition of volleyball, where players control individual volleyball players to cooperate properly and hit the ball. As the player receives the ball, they must pass it to their teammates until one hits the ball, scoring points when timed right and disallowing the opponents from deflecting the ball. Likewise, the players in the front can also deflect the ball with well-timed button presses. Eight countries' national teams are available.

== Reception ==
Electronic Gaming Monthly gave the Genesis version a 17/40 score, criticizing its repetitive gameplay and outdated 2D gameplay and comparing it unfavorably to critically acclaimed NHL Hockey by Electronic Arts.
