= Panty Raider: From Here to Immaturity =

2000 video game

- Developer(s): Hypnotix
- Publisher(s): Simon & Schuster Interactive
- Platform(s): Windows
- Release: 2000
- Genre(s): Adventure
- Mode(s): Single-player

Panty Raider: From Here to Immaturity is an adventure game developed by Hypnotix and published by Simon & Schuster Interactive in 2000 for Microsoft Windows.

== Plot ==
The story of the game involves three aliens who were accidentally shipped a lingerie catalogue from planet Earth. After the catalogue was "used up" by the aliens, they travel to Earth in search of more photos of models. The aliens capture the main character of the game and give him tools in order to get models to remove their clothing and be photographed. If he does not comply, the aliens will destroy Earth.

== Reception ==
NPD Techworld, a firm that tracked sales the United States, reported 28,692 units sold of Panty Raider by December 2002.
