= Deer Avenger =

1998 video game

- Developer: Hypnotix
- Publisher: Simon & Schuster Interactive
- Series: Deer Avenger
- Platforms: Windows; Macintosh
- Release: 1998

Deer Avenger is a 1998 video game from Simon & Schuster Interactive. The game is a parody of the game Deer Hunter.

== Gameplay ==
Deer Avenger sets up a parody of hunting games where the player takes on the role of a deer seeking revenge against hunters. The deer cannot move forward, only rotate in place, leaving players searching for clues like beer cans or magazines while waiting for targets to appear. When hunters do show up, they only run and hide, never fighting back. The deer's commentary—written by a comedy writer—adds some wit, with lines that poke fun at the game itself. Players can experiment with odd weapons, from a bazooka that incinerates targets to a slingshot that fires poop.

== Development ==
The game was announced in October 1998. Deer Avenger was written by Brian McCann, staff writer for the late-night talk show Late Night with Conan O'Brien.

== Reception ==
Reception

Review scores
Publication	Score
All Game Guide	2/5
Inside Mac Games	4/5

Inside Mac Games gave the game a score of 4 out of 5, stating: "As with most games, if you dig hard enough there are cheats available on the web. I have not tried them yet but I am sure some of them will work on the Mac. Deer Avenger is not an essential buy, but one that if you know what to expect delivers what it promises.".

The game was the top-selling software title at Walmart and made the top 10 game charts in the United States in late 1998. It appeared at number 10 of PC Data's best-seller list for all of 1999 selling 343,756 units.

Following the release of Deer Avenger in 1998, Simon & Schuster received email complaints from hunters. Walter Walker, a vice president for the company, was quoted in the Los Angeles Times saying "our first notion was to make these guys a gift of a dictionary, because not many of them can write."

== Sequels ==
The game received several sequels; Deer Avenger 2: Deer in the City, Deer Avenger 3D, and Deer Avenger 4: The Rednecks Strike Back.

Deer Avenger 3D was released in 2000 for PC. An unreleased port of the game for the Sega Dreamcast was developed by Westlake Interactive in 2000, but went undiscovered until 2017 when a pre-production GD-ROM was found at the garage sale of a women's club in New Jersey. Starting with Deer Avenger 3D, polygon characters are used.

In the fourth edition of the game, as Bubba, now an angel, floats to Heaven, he states will be back in Deer Avenger 5. However, a fifth game has yet to be made.

Deer Avenger: Stag Party is a box set containing the first two games in the series. Deer Avenger: Open Season is a compilation of the first three games in the series.
