= Bossypants =

2011 comedic autobiography by Tina Fey

- Author: Tina Fey
- Audio read by: Tina Fey
- Language: English
- Genre: Autobiography
- Publisher: Little, Brown and Company
- Publication date: April 5, 2011
- Publication place: United States
- Media type: Print
- Pages: 277
- ISBN: 0-316-05686-3
- LC Class: PN2287.F4255 A3 2011

Bossypants is an autobiographical comedy book written by the American comedian Tina Fey. The book topped The New York Times Best Seller list, and stayed there for five weeks upon its release. As of November 2014, the book has sold over 2.5 million copies since its debut, according to Nielsen BookScan. Additionally, Fey's Grammy nominated narration of the audiobook has sold over 150,000 copies on Audible.com. A paperback reprint edition was released in January 2012, from Reagan Arthur Books, an imprint of Little, Brown. The front cover, photographed by Ruvén Afanador, features hand model and actor Joe Rosario.

== Background ==
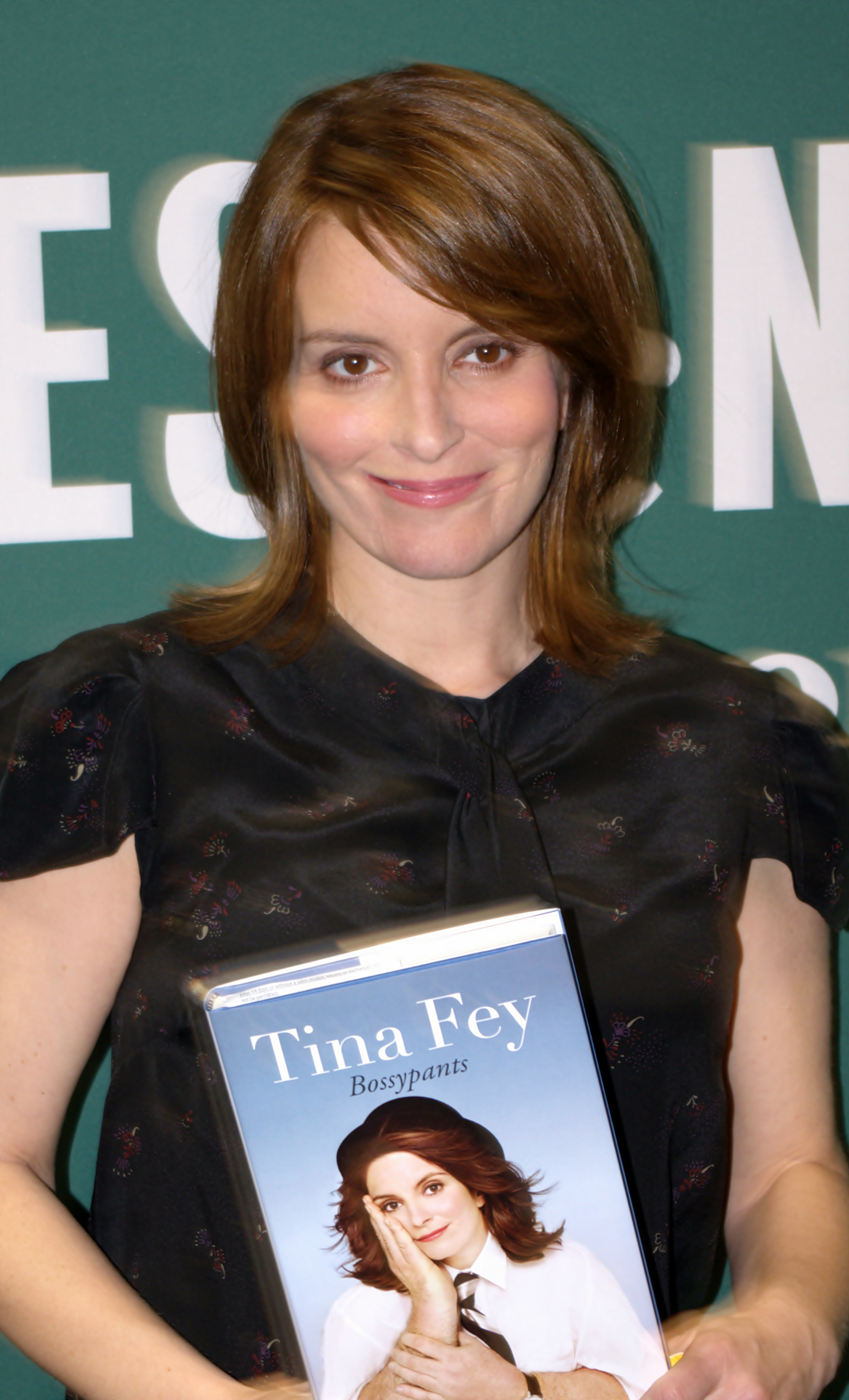
Fey holding a copy of Bossypants on her book tour at a Barnes & Noble in New York City April 8, 2011.

In 2008, the prospect of a Tina Fey book was reportedly the subject of a bidding war among publishers, which led to an advance of $6 million ($8.97 million in 2025). As part of her deal with Little, Brown & Co., a gift was made to the New York-based Books for Kids Foundation.

== Reception ==
Janet Maslin for The New York Times calls Bossypants "a spiky blend of humor, introspection, critical thinking and Nora Ephron-isms for a new generation." Katie Roiphe for Slate is favorable toward the humor in Bossypants, especially how Fey wields jokes as a personal display of power. The book was also praised by Mary McNamara of the Los Angeles Times, who wrote, "...any concern that Fey, like so many before her, has been ruined by fame is quickly dispelled by Bossypants, a book that reminds you why Fey has succeeded where so many have failed — because she is precise, professional and hilarious." Ellen Wernecke of The A.V. Club similarly said of Fey, "The artistry of her autobiography-turned-polemic raises the bar for every comedian who dares put cursor to Word doc."

It received a more mixed review from Carole Cadwalladr of The Observer, however, who opined, "There's lots to enjoy, particularly if you are, as I am, a Tina Fey fan girl. It's just the bookiness of it. Fey is out of her genre, and it shows: it takes an age to get going, and it's less like prose non-fiction than a sketch comedy in book form, with a disproportionate number of one-liners, not all of which work."
