= Wetlands (video game) =

1995 video game

- Developer(s): Hypnotix
- Publisher(s): New World Computing
- Director(s): Michael Taramykin
- Designer(s): John Philip Sousa
- Programmer(s): Thomas L. Kirchner; John A. Moschetto
- Artist(s): Jason M. Shenkman; Robert Santiago; John Skikus
- Composer(s): Grayscore
- Platform(s): MS-DOS
- Release: November 1, 1995
- Genre(s): Rail shooter
- Mode(s): Single-player

Wetlands is a rail shooter video game created by Hypnotix and published by New World Computing in 1995 for MS-DOS compatible operating systems.

== Gameplay ==
The game is a rail shooter with 20 levels. The player can move their view left and right slightly to better shoot at enemies. Level 6, in which the player controls a gun turret, is the only time in the game where the player can move their view up and down as well.

On some occasions, the player can take different routes. On such levels, the player must shoot a minimum number of specified targets before the level ends. Failure to do so results in the player character being automatically killed.

During level 9, the game briefly becomes a kind of shoot 'em up with players controlling a small, robotic drone to disable the security system of an oxygen facility.

The game makes extensive use of cutscenes with a mixture of hand drawn and 3D animations.

== Plot ==
Most of the Wetlands backstory is told through the graphic novel contained in game's manual. A nuclear test conducted in 1995 by the United States of America government under the name Project Othello altered weather patterns worldwide, resulting in years of rain immersing the Earth in water. Phillip Nahj, a once prominent scientist, is considered responsible for the disaster, despite having warned the government about the danger. The earth's population is forced to live in underwater cities. The rise in criminal activity along with the appearance of extraterrestrial invaders has caused the planet to become a haven for all manner of unlikable characters. A number of humans left for space. Interstellar war broke out between a federation of earth's remaining governments and the Volarins, a group of extremists who seek to build an intergalactic empire.

The game begins in the year 2495. The Volarins have taken over a number of the federation's planetary colonies. Nahj has been cryogenically frozen in the maximum security prison Alpha 16 until liberated by a mysterious woman. The game's protagonist, a mercenary named John Cole, is hired by the federation through General Corbett to bring Nahj back alive. He is assigned long-distance communication from his old friend Lieutenant Christine Mills: a technician with direct access to the federation's database.

After fighting hostile forces who attempt to destroy his transport ship, Cole arrives on Earth and begins his search at Omicron Station. Local crime lord Quog points him to an energy station in the blue sector where an agent of the federation was found dead. After evading local mercenaries tasked with killing him, Cole leaves Omicron Station for the energy plant. On his submarine, Cole tells Christine his deduction that Nahj's escape was aided by a special agent of the federation.

Sabotaging a supply depot and a sonar station, Cole arrives at the energy plant in blue sector; he finds the body of the agent who had liberated Nahj, killed with a shot to the back of the head. Christine tells Cole that the agent was attached to Project Othello. After holding off an attack on the energy plant using its defense systems, Cole links up the plant's computer system. Using the ion trail left by two missing power cells, Christine tells Cole that whoever took them has gone to an oxygen facility 300 miles to the northeast.

After arriving at the facility, Cole uses a probe to disable the sonar security system and docks his submarine. Inside, he is briefly subdued by three Volarin troopers but breaks free. The facility's self-destruct sequence is activated while Cole is locked out from accessing his submarine. Cole fights through a Volarin regiment while destroying 10 circuit breakers to end the security lockdown. He escapes before the facility self-destructs.

Christine tells Cole all files related to Project Othello were closed 20 years ago by General Corbett, then just a lieutenant. He was promoted to Captain just two days after. Cole tells Christine he is going to Xi colony to rest while she does more research. Christine convinces Cole to look for Nahj's research vessel, which sank during 1995, on the way to Xi colony. With the aid of a probe, Cole extracts a box of data from the wreckage. Upon seeing his findings, Christine concludes that Nahj's importance to the government was what saved him from execution in favor of being cryogenically frozen. Cole sends Christine to work in decoding the data in the box.

The data files reveal Nahj's role in Project Othello was to develop nuclear bombs that leave no radioactive fallout. Despite Nahj's warnings about side effects, the military forced him to speed up the test process resulting in Earth becoming Wetlands. The military framed Nahj for the bomb's failure resulting in his being sentenced to indefinite suspended animation. Cole asks Christine to discover why Nahj was kept alive.

Finally reaching Xi Colony, Cole takes a sabbatical. However, he is taken captive by Volarins who take him to Nahj. Cole suggests that Nahj is seeking revenge for being used by the federation. Nahj admits Cole is right, then leaves, ordering Cole be killed. Cole escapes and navigates the Xi Colony highway on a hoverbike while fighting off opposition. He arrives at a docking station and calls Christine to pinpoint a tracking device he placed on Nahj during their encounter. The signal is coming from the planet's surface.

Cole acquires a ship capable of flying above water and leaves Xi Colony in pursuit of Nahj. During the flight, Christine reveals Project Othello was never cancelled but placed on hold until the rains caused by the bomb tests ended. Nahj was to remain frozen until then to head the project. The day before his liberation, the project was reactivated. General Corbett initiated the prison break with the secret agent, but someone else took Nahj.

Cole's tracker takes him to land, something previously believed to no longer exist on Earth. The landmass has been cloaked. Cole destroys the defense systems of the landmass and flies into the ruins of New York City where his ship is shot down. Escaping into a nearby subway, Cole drives a train to a large Volarin gathering. He discovers Phillip Nahj is the leader of the Volerins and is about to lead a final assault against the federation. Cole hijacks a spaceship and flies to the federation homeworld.

After breaking through a squadron of Volarin fighters, Cole reaches Nahj's lead gunship, which contains a weapon capable of destroying planets. Nahj intends to destroy Lurian, the federation homeworld. With Volarin forces preventing federation forces from sending out ships, Cole flies into the ship, destroys its core, and flies out before it explodes. Cole flies to Lurian. Christine contacts him, telling him she monitored his accomplishment. However, Corbett is upset he and the federation did not get the gunship.

Sometime later, Cole is spending time with Christine on :urian. The news on the television reports that federation fighters, under the command of General Corbett, defeated the Volarin armada. Upon learning that Corbett is to be given a commendation, Cole shoots the television causing the game screen to fade to black.

== Reception ==
A reviewer for Next Generation scored the game two out of five stars, contending that rail shooters as a whole are too simplistic to be of much value. However, he admitted that Wetlands is one of the better examples of the genre, since its traditional cel animation realistically models human movements, there are many good humorous touches, and the plot is more inventive and unpredictable than that of the more high-profile Star Wars: Rebel Assault II: The Hidden Empire, which was released at the same time. The game sold more than 95,000 units by mid November 1995.

== Reviews ==
- Australian Realms #27

== See also ==
- Waterworld
