= Dig & Spike Volleyball =

1992 video game

- North American cover art
- Developer: TOSE
- Publishers: JP: Tonkin House; NA: Hudson Soft
- Composer: Lucky Tocky
- Platform: Super NES
- Release: JP: November 27, 1992; NA: December 1993
- Genre: Traditional volleyball simulation
- Modes: Single-player; Multiplayer

Dig & Spike Volleyball - known as Volleyball Twin (バレーボールTwin) in Japan - is a volleyball video game developed by TOSE. The player can choose either two variations: Men's indoor volleyball and Women's beach volleyball. The game was published by Nintendo, and released on the Super Nintendo Entertainment System on November 26 in Japan, and in December 1993 in North America

== Teams ==
The indoor variation is represented by eight men's national volleyball teams, based on teams that played the volleyball tournament in the 1992 Summer Olympics:

- Algeria
- Brazil
- Cuba
- Italy
- Japan
- Netherlands
- Unified Team (uses the flag of Russia)
- United States

== Reception ==
Reception

Aggregate score
Aggregator	Score
GameRankings	66% (2 reviews)

== See also ==
- FIVB World Rankings
- List of volleyball video games
