= Outlaw Volleyball =

2003 video game

- Developer: Hypnotix
- Publishers: North America; Simon & Schuster Interactive; PAL; TDK Mediactive Europe (Xbox); Global Star Software (PS2)
- Engine: RenderWare
- Platforms: PlayStation 2, Xbox
- Release: Xbox: NA: July 8, 2003; PAL: November 14, 2003; JP: November 7, 2003; PlayStation 2: PAL: April 8, 2004; NA: May 17, 2005
- Genres: Sports, fighting
- Modes: Single-player, multiplayer

Outlaw Volleyball is a video game based on the sport of volleyball. It was originally published for the Xbox and included a sampler CD of tunes by cover band Diffuser. The Xbox version was also released in Japan as part of Xbox's World Collection series. It was later ported to the PlayStation 2 with two new courts and a handful of additional player costumes, accessories, etc. under the title Outlaw Volleyball Remixed. The game is part of the Outlaw series, and other titles include Outlaw Golf and Outlaw Tennis. The game features Steve Carell as the announcer.

== Gameplay ==
There are seventeen playable characters with four available from the start, each having their own stats for the volleyball and fighting portions of the game. The game follows the normal rules of volleyball and a standard game with standard rules can be played. However, there are a number of different modes that mix up the standard formula. One example is Hot Potato, where the ball is played as a timer ticks down, and once it runs out the ball explodes upon impact of the nearest player. Another is "Casino Round", where the longer the rally, the more money the scoring team on that play gets. Individual settings can also be altered within these modes, such as adjusting whether only the serving team can score a point ("side out" rule) or any team who wins the rally gets a point.

Fighting with other characters is an option before a serve where a player can choose to fight an opponent on the other side of the net. If the player wins they earn the victim's momentum bar. Beating tokens are earned after great plays and a turnover of the serve.

== Outlaw Volleyball Red Hot ==
Outlaw Volleyball Red Hot released as a rental-only exclusive for Blockbuster, and meant to serve as a side game to the original rather than a full-fledged sequel. The game is set in hell and contains only one court, the "Pit of Hell", which was not in the original Outlaw Volleyball. Returning characters also had slight outfit variants to reflect the setting, such as red horns and devil wings.

== Development ==
Outlaw Volleyball utilized motion capture to record the character's performances. Scrapped animations and concept artwork for the game were released on the Hypnotix website. Music for the game was composed by multiple punk rock bands established in the 1990s and early 2000s, including Avoid One Thing, Diffuser, Hot Rod Circuit, Junk, The Exit, Warrior, and Waterdown. The song "Meat" was written and performed by Ron "Bumblefoot" Thal. Nile Rodgers was an executive producer for the soundtrack and MTV's Melinda Gedman served as a music supervisor. In an interview, Rodgers stated that video games were a great "showcase for new talent", as they allowed bands to achieve success outside of the music industry. Diffuser's music video "Get It On" featured gameplay footage from Outlaw Volleyball, which debuted on MTV and VH1. The original soundtrack was released on July 8, 2003, the same day as the game's launch in North America.

== Reception ==
Reception

Aggregate scores
Aggregator	Score	
Aggregator	PS2	Xbox
GameRankings	63.65%	78.49%
Metacritic	57/100	77/100

Review scores
Publication	Score	
Publication	PS2	Xbox
AllGame	N/A	3.5/5
Electronic Gaming Monthly	N/A	7.83/10
Game Informer	N/A	8.25/10
GamePro	N/A	4.5/5
GameRevolution	N/A	B
GameSpot	5.8/10	7/10
GameSpy	N/A	3/5
GameZone	N/A	8.5/10
IGN	N/A	8/10
PlayStation Official Magazine – UK	7/10	N/A
Official Xbox Magazine (US)	N/A	8.2/10
The Cincinnati Enquirer	N/A	3.5/5
Playboy	N/A	50%

Reviews ranged from positive to very mixed. GameRankings and Metacritic gave Outlaw Volleyball a score of 79% and 77 out of 100, and also gave Outlaw Volleyball Remixed a score of 64% and 57 out of 100. Critics complimented the game for its humor and online functionality, but criticized its easy difficulty, lack of gameplay depth, and repeated jokes. The PlayStation 2 version received mixed or average reviews, citing the game as a "lazy rehash" and "a clunky port of a 2-year-old title".

== See also ==
- Beach Spikers
- Dead or Alive Xtreme Beach Volleyball
- Summer Heat Beach Volleyball
