= Outlaw Golf =

Video game series

- PAL region cover art of the first game
- Developer: Hypnotix
- Publishers: NA: Simon & Schuster Interactive; EU: TDK Mediactive Europe; JP: Microsoft
- Engine: RenderWare
- Platforms: GameCube, Xbox, Windows, PlayStation 2
- Release: Xbox: NA: June 11, 2002; PAL: November 29, 2002; JP: October 23, 2003; GameCube: NA: October 30, 2002; PAL: June 24, 2003; Windows: NA: September 30, 2003; PAL: December 5, 2003; PlayStation 2: EU: November 21, 2003
- Genre: Sports
- Modes: Single-player, multiplayer

Outlaw Golf 2
- Developer: Hypnotix
- Publisher: Global Star Software
- Platforms: Xbox, PlayStation 2
- Release: NA: October 21, 2004 (Xbox); NA: November 25, 2004 (PS2); EU: February 4, 2005
- Genre: Sports
- Modes: Single-player, multiplayer (up to 4 players)

Outlaw Golf is a series of golf video games developed by Hypnotix, that are intended for adults and mature teens. Outlaw Golf was released for the Xbox on June 11, 2002; for GameCube on October 30, 2002; and for Microsoft Windows on September 30, 2003. A standalone expansion, Outlaw Golf: 9 Holes of X-Mas was released December 23, 2002 exclusively to Blockbuster. A second standalone expansion, Outlaw Golf: 9 More Holes of X-Mas, was released November 15, 2003 also exclusively to Blockbuster. An official sequel, Outlaw Golf 2, was released for Xbox on October 21, 2004, and for PlayStation 2 on November 25, 2004. The games are part of the Outlaw series, and other titles include Outlaw Volleyball and Outlaw Tennis. The Xbox version was released in Japan as part of Xbox World Collection series.

== Gameplay ==
Outlaw Golf maintains the traditional rules of golf while adding adult-themes such as sexuality and violence.

Outlaw Golf supports single player and multiplayer with 1-4 players, and Outlaw Golf 2 supports single player, online and offline multiplayer with 1-4 players. Players take control one of several characters, each with their own unique caddy. The series is noted for its crude humor, particularly in regard to the characters, most of whom fall under an exaggerated archetype. These include a stripper, a hippie, a biker, and more. Unique to the series is the Composure Meter. As players do well, the player character's composure meter increases. The maximum distance rating for each club increases or decreases in relation to the player character's composure. As the player misses shots, the Composure Meter decreases; this is designed to simulate frustration: the more shots missed, the more frustrated the player character gets and the worse they perform. In order to counteract this, the player character can beat or humiliate their caddy in some way, which raises the composure meter. Hitting a perfect shot results in the ball bursting into flames as it travels; the flames extinguishing when the turn is over. Outlaw Golf 2 includes new courses and additional golfers and caddies. While Xbox Live for the original Xbox was shut down in 2010, The Xbox port of Outlaw Golf 2 is now playable online using replacement online servers for the Xbox called Insignia.

Actor and comedian Steve Carell provides the commentator track for the original Outlaw Golf, and comedian Dave Attell takes over announcing duties in Outlaw Golf 2.

== Reception ==
=== Outlaw Golf ===
Outlaw Golf

Aggregate scores
Aggregator	Score		
Aggregator	GameCube	PC	Xbox
GameRankings	68%	43%	77%
Metacritic	69/100	N/A	72/100

Review scores
Publication	Score		
Publication	GameCube	PC	Xbox
Game Informer	7.75/10	N/A	7.75/10
GameSpot	7.1/10	N/A	7.1/10
GameSpy	2/5	N/A	3/5
IGN	6.9/10	N/A	7.2/10
PC Gamer (US)	N/A	43%	N/A

The GameCube and Xbox versions of Outlaw Golf received "average" reviews according to video game review aggregator Metacritic.

=== Outlaw Golf 2 ===
Outlaw Golf 2

Aggregate scores
Aggregator	Score	
Aggregator	PS2	Xbox
GameRankings	70%	75%
Metacritic	63/100	74/100

Review scores
Publication	Score	
Publication	PS2	Xbox
Game Informer	7.5/10	7.5/10
GameSpot	7.5/10	7.5/10
IGN	7.1/10	7.4/10
Official U.S. PlayStation Magazine	1.5/5	N/A
Official Xbox Magazine (US)	N/A	8/10
VideoGamer.com	6/10	6/10
X-Play	3/5	3/5
The Times	4/5	4/5

The sequel received "mixed or average reviews" on both platforms according to video game review aggregator Metacritic.
