= Hypnotix =

American video game developer

Hypnotix, Inc.
- Industry: Video games
- Founded: 1993; 33 years ago
- Defunct: July 2005
- Fate: Acquired by Electronic Arts and folded into EA Tiburon
- Successor: EA Tiburon
- Headquarters: Little Falls, New Jersey
- Key people: Mike Taramykin, President; Thomas Kirchner; John Sousa; Mike Cayado; Jason Shenkman
- Products: Outlaw Golf; Outlaw Volleyball; Deer Avenger
- Number of employees: 40 (2005)

Hypnotix, Inc. was an American video game developer.

== History ==
Hypnotix was founded in 1993 and was based in Manhattan. The company moved to Little Falls, New Jersey in 1996.

In July 2005, the company was acquired by Electronic Arts and folded into EA Tiburon, which develops the Madden NFL and Tiger Woods PGA Tour series.

== Games ==
- Wetlands (1995)
- Soldier Boyz (1997)
- Deer Avenger (1998)
- Deer Avenger 2: Deer in the City (1999)
- Miss Spider's Tea Party (1999)
- Bass Avenger (2000)
- Deer Avenger 3D (2000)
- Who Wants to Beat Up a Millionaire (2000)
- Panty Raider: From Here to Immaturity (2000)
- Daria's Inferno (2000)
- The $100,000 Pyramid (2001)
- Deer Avenger 4: The Rednecks Strike Back (2001)
- MTV Total Request Live Trivia (2001)
- Outlaw Golf (2002)
- Outlaw Golf: Holiday Golf (2002)
- Outlaw Volleyball (2003)
- 9 Holes of Xmas: Outlaw Golf (2003)
- Outlaw Volleyball: Red Hot (2003)
- Math Missions: The Amazing Arcade Adventure (2003)
- Math Missions: Race to the Spectacle City (2003)
- BMX Trick Racer (2003)
- Dragon Tales: Learn & Fly With Dragons (2004)
- Outlaw Golf 2 (2004)
- Outlaw Tennis (2005)
- Outlaw Volleyball: Remixed (2005)
