= Tina Fey =

American actress, writer, producer and comedian (born 1970)

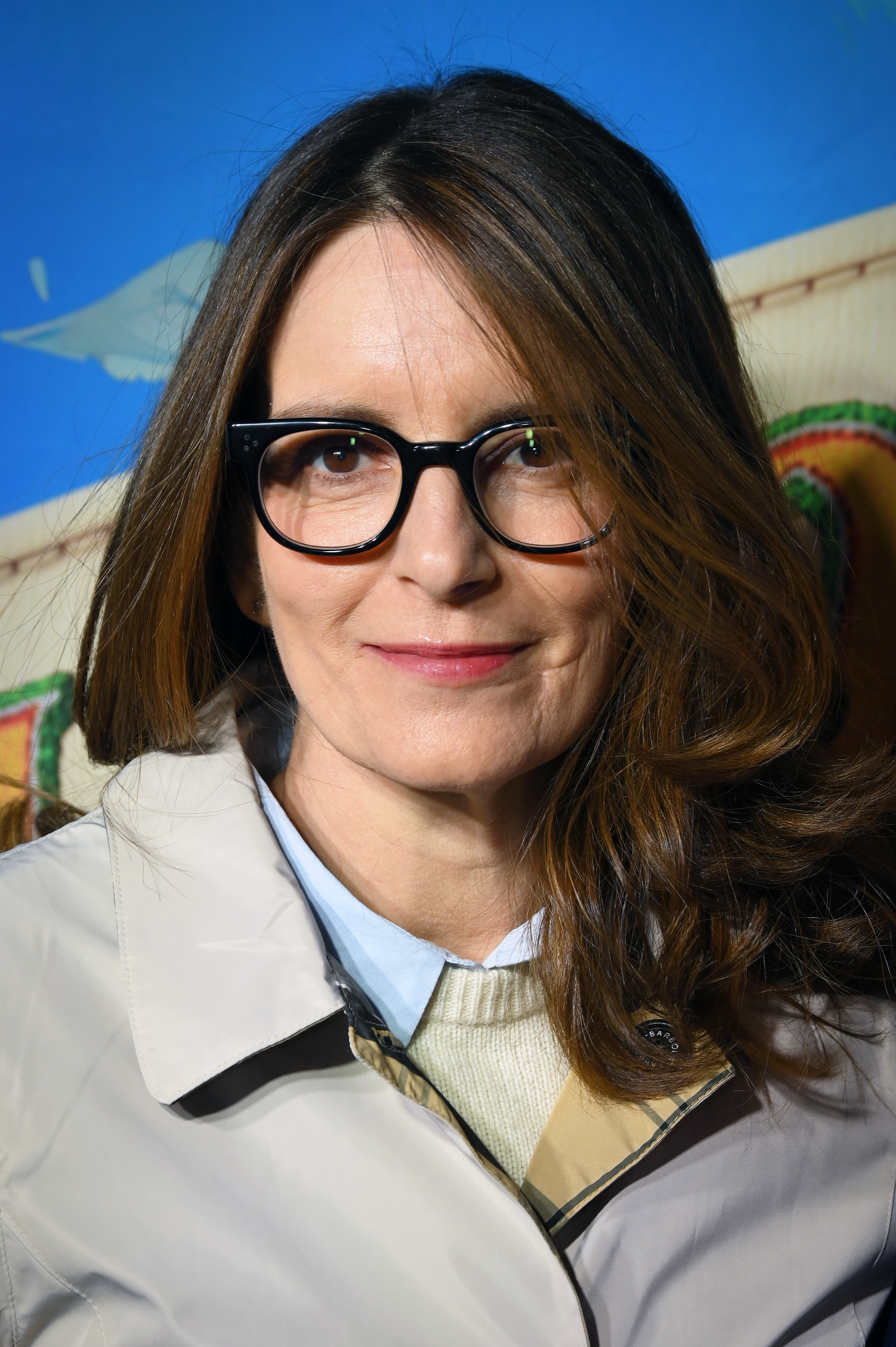
- Fey in 2026
- Born: Elizabeth Stamatina Fey; May 18, 1970 (age 56); Upper Darby Township, Pennsylvania, U.S.
- Education: University of Virginia (BA)
- Occupations: Actress; comedian; writer; producer
- Years active: 1993–present
- Works: Full list
- Spouse: Jeff Richmond (m. 2001)
- Children: 2
- Awards: Full list

Comedy career
- Medium: Television; film; theatre; books
- Genres: Improvisational comedy; blue comedy; sketch comedy; insult comedy; surreal humor; satire
- Subjects: American politics; American culture; current events; human interaction; social awkwardness; self-deprecation; pop culture

Elizabeth Stamatina "Tina" Fey (/feɪ/; born May 18, 1970) is an American actress, comedian, writer, and producer. Known for her comedic roles in sketch comedy, television and film, Fey has received numerous accolades, including ten Primetime Emmy Awards and two Golden Globe Awards as well as nominations for a Grammy Award and a Tony Award. She appeared on the Time 100 list of the 100 most influential people in the world in both 2007 and 2009, and was awarded the Mark Twain Prize for American Humor in 2010.

Fey broke into comedy as a featured player in the Chicago-based improvisational comedy group The Second City. She appeared on the NBC sketch comedy series Saturday Night Live (SNL) from 1997 to 2006, for which she served as a head writer, a performer, and co-anchor of Weekend Update. She later returned to the show portraying a satirical version of 2008 Republican vice-presidential candidate Sarah Palin in subsequent guest appearances. She gained acclaim for creating and starring as Liz Lemon in the NBC sitcom 30 Rock (2006–2013), which earned her several accolades including the Primetime Emmy Award, two Golden Globe Awards, and four Screen Actors Guild Awards for Best Actress in a Comedy Series.

She later created several shows, including the Netflix sitcom Unbreakable Kimmy Schmidt (2015–2020), the NBC sitcom Mr. Mayor (2021–2022), and the Netflix comedy-drama series The Four Seasons (2025–present), and executive produced the Peacock musical comedy series Girls5eva (2021–2024). Fey and Amy Poehler co-hosted the Golden Globe Awards four times in the years 2013, 2014, 2015, and 2021, as well as SNL in 2015, the latter of which earned them a Primetime Emmy Award. On film, Fey has acted in and wrote Mean Girls (2004) and acted in Baby Mama (2008), Date Night (2010), Megamind (2010), Admission (2013), Muppets Most Wanted (2014), Sisters (2015), Whiskey Tango Foxtrot (2016), Wine Country (2019), Soul (2020), and A Haunting in Venice (2023).

Fey released her memoir, Bossypants (2011), which topped The New York Times Best Seller list for five weeks and garnered her a Grammy Award nomination. She also created the musical adaptation Mean Girls, which premiered on Broadway in 2018, and earned her a Tony Award nomination. She later adapted the stage production into a 2024 musical film of the same name.

== Early life and education ==
Elizabeth Stamatina Fey was born on May 18, 1970, in Upper Darby Township, Pennsylvania, a suburb of Philadelphia. Her father, Donald Henry Fey (1933–2015), was a veteran of the Korean War, university administrator for the University of Pennsylvania and Thomas Jefferson University, and a grant proposal writer who raised $500 million for schools, hospitals, and public service agencies through proposals and direct mail appeals. Following her father's death, Fey established a scholarship fund in his name at his alma mater, Temple University, to support war veterans studying journalism. Her mother, Zenobia "Jeanne" (née Xenakes; Greek: Ζηνοβία Ξενάκη Φέι; 1930–2024), was born in Piraeus, Greece. She worked professionally as a brokerage employee. Fey's maternal grandmother, Vasiliki Kourelakou, left the Greek village of Petrina, Laconia, on her own and arrived in the United States in February 1921. Fey's maternal grandfather, Constantine Xenakes, was from the village of Panagia on the Greek island of Ikaria. Fey's father had English, German and Scots-Irish ancestry; one of her paternal ancestors was John Hewson, an English textile manufacturer who emigrated to the United States with the support of Benjamin Franklin, enabling Hewson to open a quilting factory in the Kensington neighborhood of Philadelphia, Pennsylvania. According to a genealogical DNA test arranged by the television series Finding Your Roots, Fey's ancestry is 94% European, 3% Middle Eastern, and 3% from the Caucasus. She has a brother, Peter, who is eight years older.

Fey describes encountering comedy early:

I remember my parents sneaking me in to see Young Frankenstein. We would also watch Saturday Night Live, or Monty Python, or old Marx Brothers movies. My dad would let us stay up late to watch The Honeymooners. We were not allowed to watch The Flintstones though: my dad hated it because it ripped off The Honeymooners. I actually have a very low level of Flintstones knowledge for someone my age.

At age 11, Fey read Joe Franklin's Seventy Years of Great Film Comedians for a school project about comedy. She grew up watching Second City Television and has cited Catherine O'Hara as a role model.

Fey went by the nickname "Tina" at an early age. She attended Cardington-Stonehurst Elementary School and Beverly Hills Middle School in Upper Darby. By middle school, she knew she was interested in comedy. Fey attended Upper Darby High School, where she was an honors student, a member of the choir, drama club, and tennis team, and co-editor of the school's newspaper, The Acorn. She anonymously wrote the newspaper's satirical column, The Colonel. Following her graduation in 1988, Fey enrolled at the University of Virginia (UVA), where she studied playwriting and acting and was awarded the Pettway Prize. During her time at UVA, she was a member of Delta Zeta sorority and the student-led theater organization, First Year Players. She graduated in 1992 with a Bachelor of Arts degree and a major in drama.

== Career ==
=== Career beginnings (1993–1997) ===
After college, Fey moved to Chicago. She worked as a receptionist during the day at the YMCA in Evanston, Illinois, and took performance classes at the improvisational comedy troupe The Second City at night. Fey started doing gigs at Improv Olympic in 1993 where she first worked with pianist and her future husband Jeff Richmond, and frequent collaborator, Amy Poehler. Both Fey and Richmond got jobs at Second City. Fey appeared in "the legendary revue 'Paradigm Lost', alongside the likes of Rachel Dratch, Kevin Dorff, Scott Adsit, Jenna Jolovitz and Jim Zulevic."

=== Saturday Night Live (1997–2006) ===
While performing shows with The Second City in 1997, Fey submitted several scripts to NBC's variety show Saturday Night Live, at the request of its head writer Adam McKay, a former performer at Second City. She was hired as a writer following a meeting with SNL creator Lorne Michaels, and moved from Chicago to New York. Fey told The New Yorker, "I'd had my eye on the show forever, the way other kids have their eye on Derek Jeter." Originally, Fey "struggled" at SNL. Her first sketch to air starred Chris Farley in a Sally Jessy Raphael satire. Fey went on to write a series of parodies, including one of ABC's morning talk show The View. She co-wrote the "Sully and Denise (The Boston Teens)" sketches with Rachel Dratch, who plays one of the teens.

Fey was an extra in a 1998 episode, and after watching herself, decided to diet and lost 30 pounds. She told The New York Times, "I was a completely normal weight, but I was here in New York City, I had money and I couldn't buy any clothes. After I lost weight, there was interest in putting me on camera." In 1999, McKay stepped down as head writer, which led Michaels to approach Fey for the position. She became SNL's first female head writer. In January 2001, she appeared on an episode of Real World/Road Rules Extreme Challenge as a judge of a comedy-based mission.

In 2000, Fey began performing in sketches and became a co-anchor of SNL's Weekend Update segment alongside Jimmy Fallon. Fey said she did not ask to audition, but that Michaels approached her. Michaels explained that there was chemistry between Fey and Fallon, though he felt the decision was "kind of risky" at the time. Her role in Weekend Update was well received by critics. Ken Tucker of Entertainment Weekly wrote: "Fey delivers such blow darts – poison filled jokes written in long, precisely parsed sentences unprecedented in [Weekend Update] history – with such a bright, sunny countenance makes her all the more devilishly delightful." Dennis Miller, a former cast member of SNL and anchor of Weekend Update, was pleased with Fey as one of the anchors: "Fey might be the best Weekend Update anchor who ever did it. She writes the funniest jokes." Robert Bianco of USA Today, however, commented that he was "not enamored" of the pairing.

In 2001, Fey and the rest of the writing staff won a Writers Guild of America Award for SNL's 25th anniversary special. The following year at the 2002 Emmy Awards ceremony, they won the Emmy for Outstanding Writing for a Variety, Music or Comedy Program.

When Fallon left the show in May 2004, he was replaced on Weekend Update by Amy Poehler. It was the first time that two women had co-anchored Weekend Update. Fey revealed that she "hired" Poehler as her co-host for the segment. The reception was positive, with Rachel Sklar of the Chicago Tribune noting that the pairing "has been a hilarious, pitch-perfect success as they play off each other with quick one-liners and deadpan delivery".

The 2005–2006 season was Fey's last; she departed SNL to develop 30 Rock for Broadway Video. At the time she left, the 117 episodes she co-hosted made her SNL's longest-serving Weekend Update anchor, a mark that would later be passed by her replacement, Seth Meyers. In Rolling Stone's February 2015 appraisal of all 141 SNL cast members to date, Fey was ranked third in importance (behind John Belushi and Eddie Murphy). They credited her with "salvaging [Weekend Update] from a decade-long losing streak", and "slapping SNL out of its late-nineties coma."

=== 30 Rock (2006–2013, 2020) ===
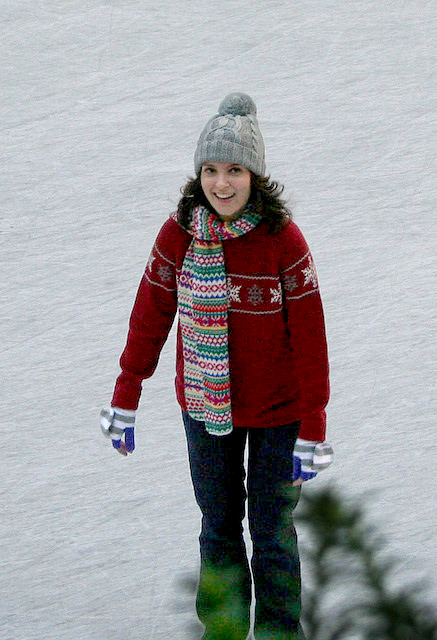
Fey filming the episode "Ludachristmas" of 30 Rock at Rockefeller Center in October 2007

In 2002, Fey suggested a pilot episode for a situation comedy about a cable news network to NBC, which rejected it. The pilot was reworked to revolve around an SNL-style series, and was accepted by NBC. She signed a contract with NBC in May 2003, which allowed her to continue in her position within SNL as head writer at least through the 2004–2005 television season. As part of the contract, Fey was to develop a prime-time project to be produced by Broadway Video and NBC Universal. The pilot, directed by Adam Bernstein, centered on Liz Lemon (Fey), the head writer of a variety show on NBC, and how she managed her relationships with the show's volatile stars and the new head of the network. In October 2006, the pilot aired on NBC as 30 Rock. Although the episode received generally favorable reviews, it finished third in its time slot.

In 2007, Fey received an Emmy Award nomination for Outstanding Actress in a Comedy Series. The show itself won the 2007 Primetime Emmy for Outstanding Comedy Series (and did so again for two subsequent years). In 2008, she won the Golden Globe, Screen Actors Guild, and Emmy awards all in the category for Best Actress in a Comedy Series. The following year, Fey again won the Golden Globe and Screen Actors Guild Award in the same categories, and was nominated for an Emmy Award. In early 2010, Fey received a Golden Globe nomination for Best Actress, and won the Screen Actors Guild Award for Best Lead Actress. 30 Rock returned for the 2011–2012 season, though due to Fey's pregnancy with her second child, the season premiere was delayed until midseason.

Fey's performance on the show was inspired by Julia Louis-Dreyfus, and later used Louis-Dreyfus to play the stand-in for the character of Liz Lemon in flashback scenes during the live episode "Live Show" of the fifth season. After receiving 13 Emmy Award nominations and two wins for the final season, 30 Rock ended its run with 112 Emmy Award nominations. It has been cited as one of the greatest TV series of all time and it is considered to have one of the greatest finales in television history.

The show returned for a remotely produced hourlong special which aired on July 16, 2020.

On June 23, 2020, Fey apologized for episodes of 30 Rock where characters appeared in blackface. The episodes, which originally aired in seasons three, five, and six, were removed from streaming services and are no longer shown in re-runs. In her apology, Fey wrote:

As we strive to do the work and do better in regards to race in America, we believe that these episodes featuring actors in race-changing make-up are best taken out of circulation.

=== Unbreakable Kimmy Schmidt (2015–2020) ===
In 2015, Fey created and produced the television comedy Unbreakable Kimmy Schmidt with fellow 30 Rock-alumnus Robert Carlock. The series stars Ellie Kemper as the titular character who escapes from a doomsday cult and moves to New York City. It also stars Fey's former co-star Jane Krakowski, as well as Tituss Burgess (who had previously appeared in four 30 Rock episodes) and Carol Kane. Although it was originally produced for NBC, it was eventually sold to Netflix and renewed for a second season. The show premiered on March 6, 2015, to critical acclaim.

On July 16, 2015, the series was nominated for seven Primetime Emmy Awards, including Outstanding Comedy Series. Fey was nominated both as the creator/executive producer of the series and for Outstanding Guest Actress in a Comedy Series for her guest performance as Marcia, a bumbling prosecutor in reference to Marcia Clark.

In the second season, Fey joined the cast in the role of Kimmy's psychiatrist Andrea Bayden, a role she reprised for season three. The season, along with the subsequent two seasons, were nominated for the Primetime Emmy Award for Outstanding Comedy Series, among other nominations. The fourth and final season concluded on January 25, 2019.

On May 8, 2019, it was announced that the series would return with an interactive special, which premiered on May 12, 2020. The special was released to positive reviews from critics and earned a nomination for the Primetime Emmy Award for Outstanding Television Movie.

=== The Four Seasons (2025–present) ===
Fey co-created, wrote, executive produced, and starred in the Netflix comedy-drama series The Four Seasons, inspired by the 1981 film of the same name, which was written and directed by Alan Alda. The series also starred Colman Domingo, Kerri Kenney-Silver, Steve Carell, Will Forte, Erika Henningsen, and Marco Calvani. Created alongside previous collaborators Tracey Wigfield and Lang Fisher, it premiered in May 2025 to positive reviews.

On May 14, 2025, Netflix announced the series had been renewed for a second season, which premiered in May 2026. Fey made her directorial debut with the second season episode "Funky Motel". She explained, "I've always felt that I really wanted to leave [directing] with people [for whom it's] their great passion [...] But at this point I thought, 'OK, I think it's time to try it,' because this show itself is such a great passion of mine."

In June 2026, Netflix renewed the series for an eight-episode third season.

=== Feature films ===
In 2002, Fey appeared in the surreal comedy Martin & Orloff. She made her debut as writer and co-star of the 2004 teen comedy Mean Girls. Characters and behaviors in the film are based on Fey's high school life at Upper Darby High School and on the non-fiction book Queen Bees and Wannabes by Rosalind Wiseman. The cast includes other past cast members of SNL including Tim Meadows, Ana Gasteyer, and Amy Poehler. The film received favorable reviews, and was a box office success, grossing US$129 million worldwide.

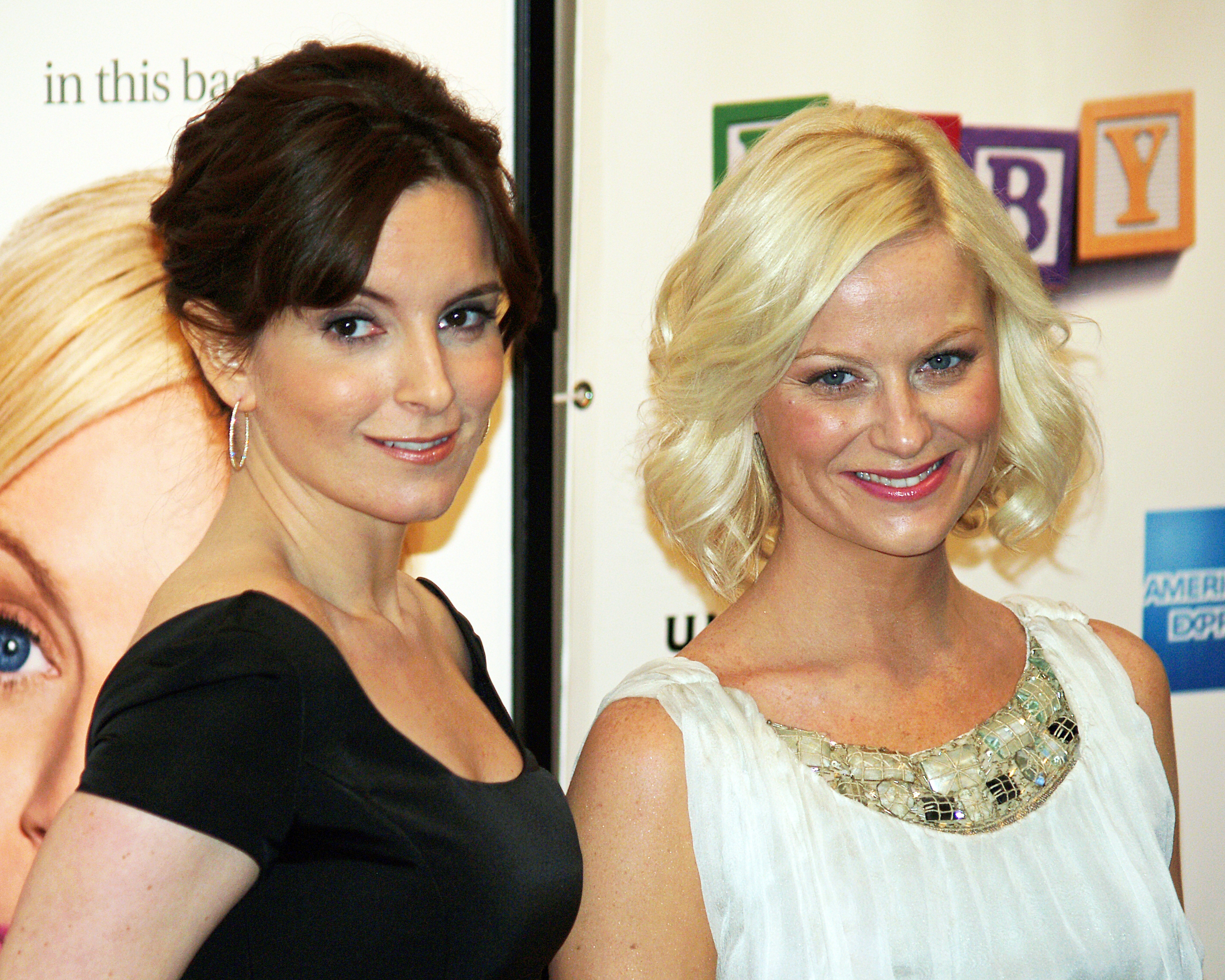
Fey (left) with Amy Poehler at the premiere of Baby Mama in New York, April 23, 2008

In a 2004 interview, Fey expressed a desire to write and direct films. In 2006, Fey worked on a script for Paramount Pictures, which was to feature Sacha Baron Cohen, by the name of Curly Oxide and Vic Thrill, based loosely on the true story of a Hasidic rock musician. In 2007, she was cast in the animated comedy film Aqua Teen Hunger Force Colon Movie Film for Theaters as the Aqua Teens' mother, a giant burrito.

She received her SAG card after appearing in Artie Lange's Beer League released in 2006, in which she was compelled to join for "a thousand dollars".

Fey and former SNL castmate Amy Poehler starred in the 2008 comedy Baby Mama. The film was written and directed by Michael McCullers. The plot concerns Kate (Fey), a business woman, who wants a child but, discovering she has only a million-to-one chance of getting pregnant, decides to find a surrogate: Angie (Poehler), an obnoxious schemer. Baby Mama received mixed reviews, but critics enjoyed Fey's performance. Todd McCarthy of Variety wrote: "Fey is a delight to watch throughout. Able to convey Kate's intentions and feelings through the simple looks and inflections, she never melodramatizes her situation; nor does her efficient, perfectionist side become overbearing." The movie grossed over US$64 million at the box office.

Fey's projects after 2008 include a voice role in the English-language version of the Japanese animated film Ponyo. In 2009, she appeared in The Invention of Lying. Her next film role was in Shawn Levy's 2010 comedy Date Night, a feature that focuses on a married couple, played by Fey and Steve Carell, who go on a date; however, the night goes awry for the two. Also in the same year, she voiced Roxanne "Roxie" Ritchi, a television reporter, in the DreamWorks animated film Megamind (2010). With a total worldwide gross of US$321 million, Megamind is Fey's most commercially successful picture to date. It earned US$173 million outside the U.S. and US$148 million domestically.

In 2013, Fey starred alongside Paul Rudd in the romantic comedy-drama film Admission, based on the Jean Hanff Korelitz novel by the same name. The film was directed by Paul Weitz. Fey later starred in the 2014 comedy-drama This Is Where I Leave You, helmed by Date Night director Shawn Levy. As was the case with Baby Mama, although both of these films received generally mixed reviews, Fey's performances were well received by film critics.

In 2015, it was announced Fey would be the narrator for the Disneynature film Monkey Kingdom, which was released in theaters on April 17, 2015. She again worked with Poehler, starring in the 2015 comedy film Sisters as the title characters, and received positive reviews for her role. In 2016, Fey starred in the biographical war comedy-drama Whiskey Tango Foxtrot, based on the memoir The Taliban Shuffle: Strange Days in Afghanistan and Pakistan, to mixed reviews, with some criticizing the whitewashing of characters of color in the film. Fey dedicated the film to her late father, Don Fey, a veteran, writer, university administrator, and firefighter.

Fey had a supporting role in the comedy film Wine Country, longtime collaborator Amy Poehler's directorial debut, which was released on Netflix in 2019. In August 2019, it was announced that Fey would voice 22, the co-lead role in the Pixar fantasy comedy adventure film Soul, which was released on Disney+ in December 2020 to critical acclaim. The film went on to receive three Academy Award nominations, including a win for Best Animated Feature. For her performance, Fey won the Critics' Choice Super Award for Best Voice Actress in an Animated Movie.

In 2023, Fey starred alongside Jon Hamm in the black comedy film Maggie Moore(s), directed by John Slattery. That same year, she starred as the fictional novelist Ariadne Oliver in Kenneth Branagh's mystery film A Haunting in Venice, his third featuring Hercule Poirot and based on Agatha Christie novels. Fey was a part of the ensemble, alongside Michelle Yeoh and Jamie Dornan.

In 2024, Fey wrote, produced, and starred in the musical comedy film Mean Girls. It is an adaptation of the stage musical Mean Girls, itself based on the original film she wrote and starred in. Fey reprised her role as Ms. Sharon Norbury in the film.

=== Subsequent SNL appearances ===
On February 23, 2008, Fey hosted the first episode of SNL after the 2007–2008 Writers Guild of America strike. For this appearance, she was nominated for a Primetime Emmy Award in the category of Individual Performance in a Variety or Music Program. Fey hosted SNL for a second time on April 10, 2010, and for her appearance she received a Primetime Emmy Award nomination for Outstanding Guest Actress in a Comedy Series.

From September to November 2008, Fey made multiple guest appearances on SNL to perform a series of parodies of Republican vice-presidential candidate Sarah Palin. On the 34th-season premiere episode, aired September 13, 2008, Fey imitated Palin in a sketch, alongside Amy Poehler as Hillary Clinton. Their repartee included Clinton needling Palin about her "Tina Fey glasses". The sketch quickly became NBC's most-watched viral video, with 5.7 million views by the following Wednesday. Fey reprised this role on the show of October 4, on the show of October 18 where she was joined by the real Sarah Palin, and on the show of November 1, where she was joined by John McCain and his wife Cindy. The show of October 18 had the best ratings of any SNL show since 1994. The following year Fey won an Emmy in the category of Outstanding Guest Actress in a Comedy Series for her impersonation of Palin. In December 2009, Entertainment Weekly put her Palin impersonation on its end-of-the-decade "best-of" list, writing, "Fey's freakishly spot-on SNL impersonation of the wannabe VP (and her ability to strike a balance between comedy and cruelty) made for truly transcendent television." Rolling Stone called her Palin impression "[arguably] the most brilliant move SNL ever made".

Fey returned to SNL in April 2010, and reprised her impression of Palin in one sketch titled the "Sarah Palin Network". Fey once again did her impression of Palin when she hosted Saturday Night Live on May 8, 2011. She hosted again on September 28, 2013. Fey returned to host on December 19, 2015, for which she won the Emmy Award for Outstanding Guest Actress in a Comedy Series. Her most recent hosting appearance was on May 19, 2018, during which she revived her Sarah Palin impression.

Fey served as one of the presenters in a late 2021 episode hosted by Paul Rudd, in an emergency restructuring due to a surge in cases of the SARS-CoV-2 Omicron variant. This included her doing Weekend Update with incumbent co-anchor Michael Che. In 2026, she hosted the first episode of Saturday Night Live UK, a British adaptation of the original American series. A sketch from the episode, "The Live Paddington Bear Experience", was later referenced when Tina returned to SNL two weeks later to feature in Jack Black's hosted episode, wearing a fur coat made out of the fictional character.

=== Other work ===
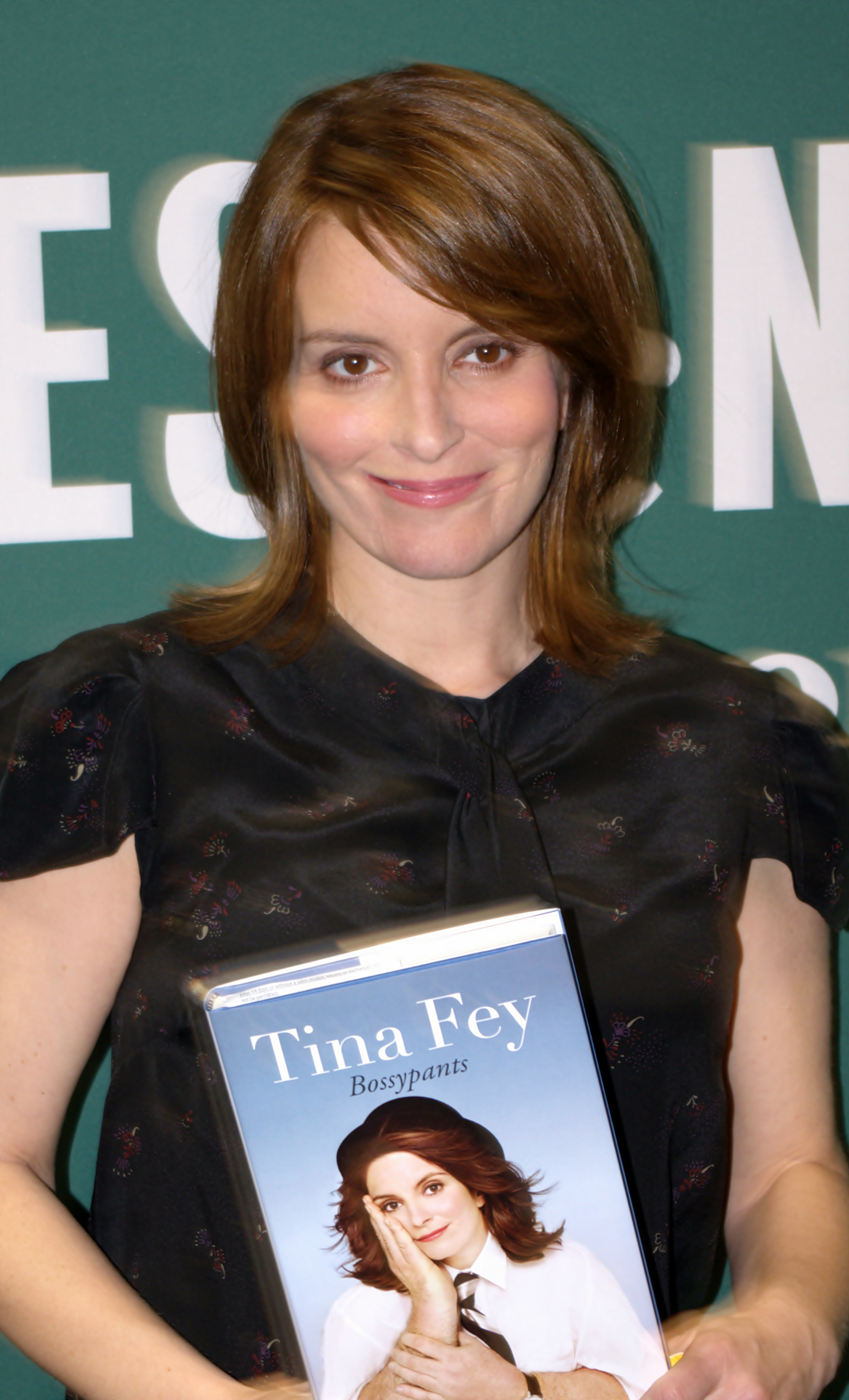
Fey holding a copy of Bossypants, published in April 2011

In 1997, Fey and other members of The Second City provided voices for the pinball game Medieval Madness.

In 1999, Fey and Amy Poehler provided voices for the video game Deer Avenger 2: Deer in the City.

In 2000, Fey partnered with fellow SNL cast member Rachel Dratch in the Off Broadway two-woman show Dratch & Fey at the Upright Citizens Brigade Theater in New York City. The production was well received by critics. Tim Townsend of The Wall Street Journal wrote that the fun part of watching Fey and Dratch perform was "seeing how comfortable they are with each other". He concluded that the production "isn't about two women being funny ... Dratch and Fey are just funny. Period." One of the SNL sketches, "Sully and Denise", originated at The Second City.

In 2001, Fey formed the television production company Little Stranger with longtime collaborator Eric Gurian. It produces many projects Fey is featured in, including the sitcoms 30 Rock and Unbreakable Kimmy Schmidt.

On August 13, 2007, Fey made a guest appearance in the Sesame Street episode "The Bookaneers". She appeared as a guest judge on the November 25, 2007, episode of the Food Network program Iron Chef America.

Fey has appeared as Tinker Bell in Disney's campaign "Year of a Million Dreams". She has also done commercials for American Express and Garnier Nutrisse. Fey also had guest voice roles in the animated comedy series SpongeBob SquarePants and Phineas and Ferb.

On April 5, 2011, Fey's autobiography, Bossypants, was released to a positive review from The New York Times. Critic Janet Maslin reviewed the book, saying that "Bossypants isn't a memoir. It's a spiky blend of humor, introspection, critical thinking and Nora Ephron-isms for a new generation." The book topped The New York Times Best Seller list and remained there for five weeks upon its release.

In 2011, Fey narrated The Secret Life of Girls, a two-hour-long radio documentary produced by The Kitchen Sisters. She introduced stories of women and girls from around the world, and also shared memories of her own girlhood and mother.

In 2012, Fey made her rapping debut on the Childish Gambino (Donald Glover) mixtape Royalty. Glover is a former writer on 30 Rock, on which he worked with Fey. That same year, Fey was featured as herself in the episode "iShock America" of the Nickelodeon teen sitcom iCarly.

On January 13, 2013, Fey hosted the 70th Golden Globe Awards with Amy Poehler, to critical acclaim. The duo hosted again in 2014 and 2015, generating the highest ratings for the annual ceremony in a decade and receiving similar acclaim.

In 2015, Fey guest starred in the Comedy Central variety sketch series Inside Amy Schumer, alongside Julia Louis-Dreyfus and Patricia Arquette. In 2016, she had guest roles in the NBC variety series Maya & Marty and the Hulu dark comedy series Difficult People.

In 2017, Fey recurred as Diana St. Tropez on the NBC sitcom Great News, which she co-executive produced. Also in 2017, Fey adapted Mean Girls into a musical of the same name. It opened on Broadway on April 8, 2018, receiving twelve Tony Award nominations, including a nomination for Best Book of a Musical for Fey. In January 2020, producers of the stage musical announced that it was being adapted as a feature film by Paramount Pictures.

Fey co-created, wrote and executive produced the NBC sitcom Mr. Mayor, starring Ted Danson and Holly Hunter. The series premiered in January 2021. In February 2021, Fey returned to co-host the 78th Golden Globe Awards with Amy Poehler, for the first ever bi-coastal show. Fey was broadcast live from the Rainbow Room in New York City and Poehler from the usual venue at The Beverly Hilton in Los Angeles. Fey executive produced the Peacock musical comedy series Girls5eva, which premiered in May 2021 to critical acclaim. She additionally guest starred in an episode of the series as Dolly Parton. Also in 2021, Fey began a recurring role as Cinda Canning, a true crime podcaster, in the Hulu mystery comedy series Only Murders in the Building. In the same year, Fey reprised her role as 22 in the short film 22 vs. Earth.

In March 2020, Netflix announced a 20-episode order for the animated sitcom Mulligan, with Fey as executive producer alongside frequent collaborators Sam Means and Robert Carlock. She also voiced the character of Dr. Farrah Braun in the series, which premiered in May 2023.

Fey executive produced the NBC sports mockumentary sitcom The Fall and Rise of Reggie Dinkins, which was created by frequent collaborators Robert Carlock and Sam Means. The series premiered in January 2026 to critical acclaim.

== Comedic and acting style ==
Fey is known for her deadpan humor and delivery; her "sardonic wit" has become a professional trademark, upon which several critics have commented in their reviews of Fey's work. According to Los Angeles Times critic Mary McNamara, Fey "project[s] both oblivious security and hyper-alert insecurity with the same expression" in her performances, while The Chronicle's Dillon Fernando wrote that the actress specializes in "delectable, situational and ironic comedy". On Fey's comedic prowess, Saturday Night Live creator Lorne Michaels enthused that his former employee "has a very clear take on things ... It always comes from a place of intelligence and there is just an edge to it." Michaels concluded, "It's not fearful. It's strong and confident and you recognise the voice and most of the time you agree with it." Writing for The Guardian, Christopher Goodwin believes that Fey "fashioned her comic persona around her glasses", which she has worn since 1995; Fey joked that "Glasses make anyone look smarter."

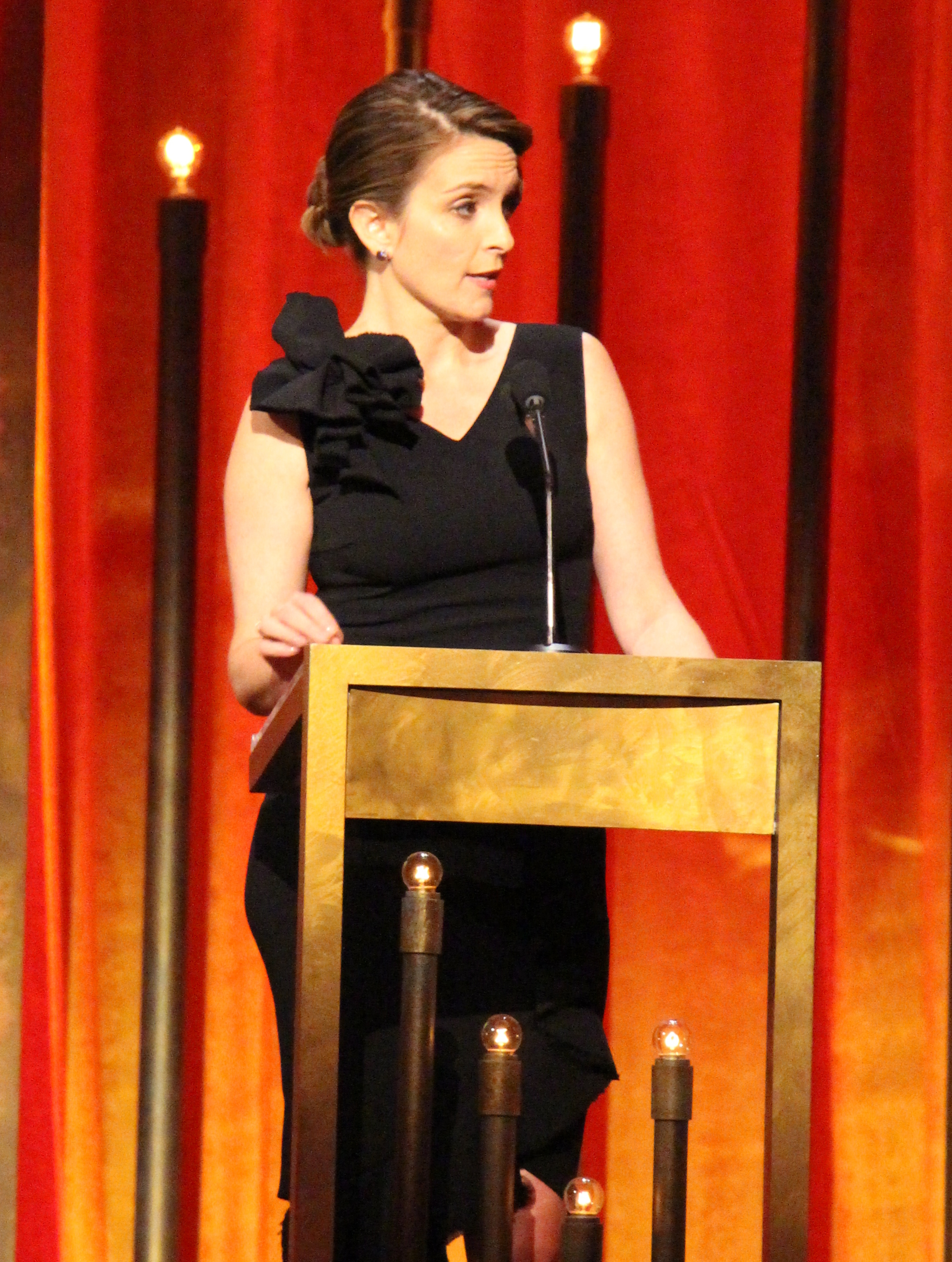
Fey presenting an award at the 2015 Peabody Awards

Seldom hesitating to use herself as the butt of her own jokes, Fey is also well known for practicing self-deprecating humor, as demonstrated throughout her performance as Liz Lemon in 30 Rock. In an article ranking Fey's six greatest jokes, David Renshaw of The Guardian wrote that the performer's work continues to feature her "trademark mix of snark, self-deprecation, and pop-culture smarts." Fey's self-deprecating comedic style inspired Ashley Fetters of The Atlantic to recognize her as comedian Phyllis Diller's successor because of their similar humor. Critics have been divided in their opinions and discussions of Fey's use of self-deprecating humor, and its effect on women as a female comic; while blogger Kate Harding disapproved of Fey's performance in 30 Rock because "I'm torn between being sad that she apparently doesn't see [beauty] in herself and being pissed off that she's reinforcing the idea that having brown hair, glasses, and a figure that's maybe a size 2 instead of a 0 actually equals ugly", Jessica G. of Jezebel defended the actress, writing that Fey's performance is "supposed to be parodying precisely the kinds of media that reinforce ideas that unconventional women are unworthy." Writing that Harding misunderstood Fey's intentions, the author concluded that her self-deprecation "is precisely what makes her relatable", elaborating that "[women] have many moments of self-doubt, and seeing someone as successful as Tina Fey be self-deprecating gives us all permission to be imperfect." Sophie Caldecott of Verily defended Fey's modesty and tendency to downplay her own physical appearance: "She mocks her own appearance, sure, but she does so in a way that consistently shows up our culture for placing so much importance on how women look, as if that's the most interesting thing about us ... Her comic persona on 30 Rock, Liz Lemon, can be laughed at for many things, but her career managerial style and ability is not one of them." Caldecott concluded, "In reality, self-deprecation is an art that comedians everywhere dabble in ... In fact, I defy you to find a good male comedian who isn't a master of self-deprecation. Comedians make fun of themselves for many reasons, mostly because it is the most readily accessible source of inspiration but also because it is the most generous one." Observing that Fey's material lacks "whining", Gina Barreca of the Hartford Courant wrote that Fey's comedy "is not simply an iteration of self-deprecating femininity passing itself off as humor. In itself, this demarcates the current generation of female humorists from earlier generations of performers who were told, more or less, to use themselves not as a sounding board for ideas but as a punching bag for insults." Fey has also garnered criticism for being politically incorrect, but she defends her right to write borderline jokes, saying that she has chosen to "opt out" of the culture of demanding apologies.

As an actress, Fey has developed a reputation for portraying "the hilarious, self-deprecating unmarried career woman" in most of her films to-date. The Boston Globe's Janice Paige defended her limited filmography by writing that, unlike most film actors, Fey remains "realistic about her range as a leading lady and says she's been deliberate about only taking on parts for which she actually seems suited." Fey explained that she approaches each role asking herself, "Would I be plausible in this role, in this job?" However, her role as Kate Ellis in 2015's Sisters provided Fey with an opportunity to stray from playing the type-A female characters for which she has become known. The New York Times film critic A. O. Scott wrote, "We're used to seeing Ms. Fey ... as an anxious overthinker using her caustic sarcasm as a weapon against both her own insecurities and the flakes and train wrecks who surround her. This time, she gets to be the train wreck." In 30 Rock, Fey's acting was influenced by both physical and improvisational comedy while, as a writer, her "carefully written scripts" were often quirky and character-driven.

Fey stated that some of the artists who inspired her in her career include British feminist playwright Caryl Churchill, comedian Chris Rock, and composer and lyricist Stephen Sondheim.

== Public image ==
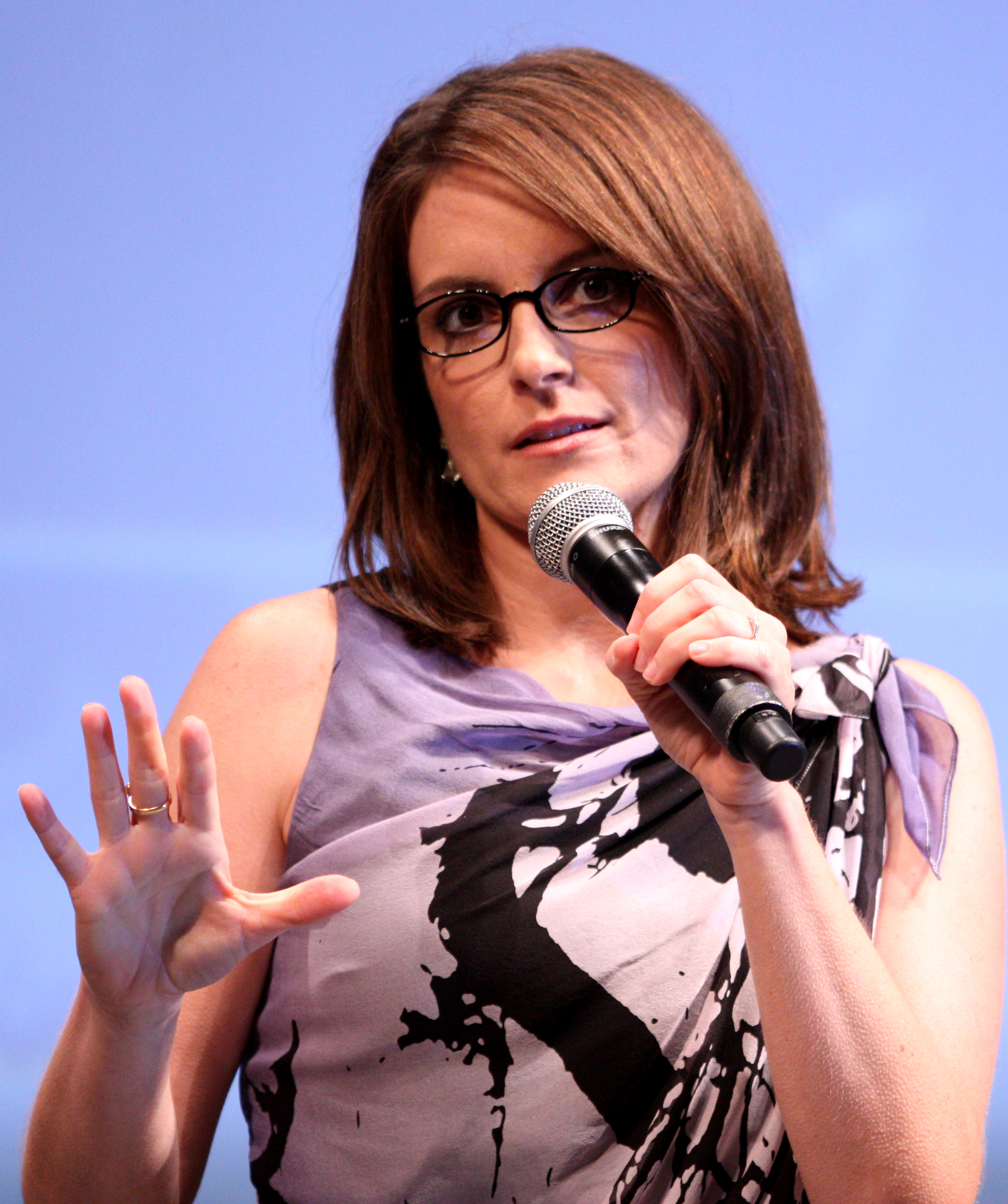
Fey at the 2010 San Diego Comic-Con promoting Megamind

In 2001, Entertainment Weekly named Fey as one of their Entertainers of the Year for her work on Weekend Update. In 2007, she was named one of the magazine's Entertainers of the Year, and placed number two in 2008. In 2009, Fey was named as Entertainment Weekly's fifth individual in their 15 Entertainers of the 2000s list. In 2013, Entertainment Weekly crowned Fey as "The Once and Future Queen" (an allusion to The Once and Future King) in their feature on "Women Who Run TV", calling her "the funniest woman in the free world." EW quoted Mindy Kaling as saying, "I always feel unoriginal bringing up Tina as my inspiration, but she's everyone's inspiration for a reason." The column also quoted praise by Zooey Deschanel and Lena Dunham.

In 2002, Fey was ranked in the Hot 100 List at number 80 on Maxim magazine, which used photos taken earlier by Rolling Stone calling her "the thinking man's sex symbol". She was named one of People magazine's 50 Most Beautiful People in 2003, and continued as one of People magazine's 100 Most Beautiful People in 2007, 2008, and 2009. In 2007, Fey placed seventh on the Hot 100 List on AfterEllen.com. She repeated the appearance the following year, being voted as number one on the list.

The newspaper editors and broadcast producers of the Associated Press voted Fey the AP Entertainer of the Year as the performer who had the greatest impact on culture and entertainment in 2008, citing her impression of Sarah Palin on SNL. She has appeared on Forbes's annual Celebrity 100 list of the 100 most powerful celebrities in 2008, 2009, 2010, 2011, and 2012 at No. 99, No. 86, No. 90, No. 92, and No. 79 respectively.

Fey was among the Time 100, a list of the 100 most influential people in the world, in 2007 and 2009, as selected annually by Time magazine. Fey's featured article for the 2009 list was written by 30 Rock co-star, Alec Baldwin. She was selected by Barbara Walters as one of America's 10 Most Fascinating People of 2008.

In September 2011, Fey was ranked at the top of Forbes magazine's list of the highest-paid TV actresses. In June 2010, it was announced Fey would receive a star on the Hollywood Walk of Fame in 2011. In 2014, Fey was recognized by Elle magazine during The Women in Hollywood Awards, honoring women for their outstanding achievements in film, spanning all aspects of the motion picture industry, including acting, directing, and producing.

In 2019, Fey was proclaimed the best comedian of the 21st century by The Guardian.

== Charity work ==
Fey is a supporter of Mercy Corps, a global relief and development organization, in their campaign to end world hunger. Fey narrated a video for Mercy Corps's Action Center in New York City, describing hunger as a symptom of many wider world problems. She also supports the Love Our Children USA organization, which fights violence against children, who named her among their Mothers Who Make a Difference, in 2009. She was the 2009 national spokesperson for the Light the Night Walk, which benefits the Leukemia & Lymphoma Society.

Fey has granted wishes for The Make-A-Wish Foundation and hosted the 2018 Power of a Wish Gala in New York City.

In 2020, Tina Fey, alongside Andrea Martin, Serj Tankian, and other celebrities, attended the televised benefit "Moving Mountains", hosted by the Children of Armenia Fund to raise money for impoverished children in Armenia. The benefit raised over $4.5 million.

== Personal life ==
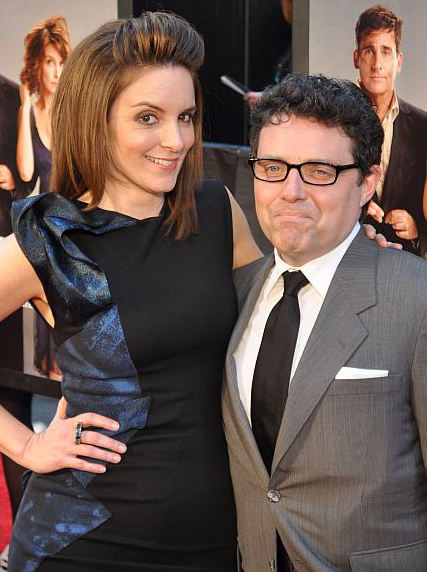
Fey with husband Jeff Richmond at the premiere of Date Night in April 2010

In 1994, two years after Fey joined Chicago's Second City improvisational theatre troupe, she began dating Jeff Richmond, a pianist who later became Second City's musical director and then a composer on 30 Rock. They married in a Greek Orthodox ceremony on June 3, 2001. They have two daughters. In April 2009, Fey and Richmond purchased a US$3.4 million apartment on the Upper West Side in New York City.

Fey has a scar a few inches long on the left side of her chin and cheek. It was caused by her being slashed in the face by a stranger while she was playing in the front yard of her house when she was five years old in 1975.

Fey is a close friend of Andrea Martin, citing an Armenian–Greek kinship that she felt on the set of Hulu's Difficult People. The two frequently attend the annual Children of Armenia Fund.

== Filmography and awards ==
Among her numerous accolades, Fey has won ten Primetime Emmy Awards, three Golden Globes, five Screen Actors Guild Awards, seven Writers Guild Awards, and three Producers Guild Awards. She has also been nominated for a Grammy Award and a Tony Award.

In 2008, she received the AP Entertainer of the Year Award from the Associated Press. In 2010, Fey was awarded the Mark Twain Prize for American Humor, becoming the youngest-ever recipient of the award, and it was announced that she would receive a star on the Hollywood Walk of Fame in 2011. In 2018, Fey received the Herb Sargent Award for Comedy Excellence from the Writers Guild of America together with frequent collaborator Robert Carlock.

== Published works ==
- Fey, Tina (2011). Bossypants. Reagan Arthur Books. ISBN 978-0316056861.

Media offices
| Preceded by Colin Quinn | Weekend Update anchor with Jimmy Fallon 2000–2004 with Amy Poehler 2004–2006; 2000–2006 | Succeeded by Seth Meyers and Amy Poehler |
