= Who Wants to Beat Up a Millionaire =

2000 video game

- North American Dreamcast cover art
- Developer: Hypnotix
- Publishers: NA: Simon & Schuster Interactive; EU: Xplorys
- Platforms: Microsoft Windows, Dreamcast
- Release: Windows: NA: August 8, 2000; EU: May 11, 2001; Dreamcast: NA: October 2000
- Genre: Action
- Modes: Single-player, Multiplayer

Who Wants to Beat Up a Millionaire is a video game parody of Who Wants to Be a Millionaire developed by Hypnotix, and released in 2000 by Simon & Schuster Interactive for Microsoft Windows and Sega Dreamcast.

While the Microsoft Windows versions feature mainly 2D animation and menus, the Dreamcast version uses 3D models for the player, as well as 3D environments and the millionaires the player beats up, rather than 2D animation in the PC version.

== Gameplay ==
The objective of the game is to answer multiple-choice questions correctly by using a buzzer. Following this, the player assaults another player's character. The objective of the game is to assault another player sufficiently so that they drop off the game's ladder, a parody of the real show's question ladder. The last player is the winner.

=== Lifeboats ===
Like its more serious (and non-violent) real-life counterpart, Who Wants to Beat Up a Millionaire gives the contestants "lifelines" (also known in-game as "lifeboats") to help them out if they get stumped. The three lifeboats are:

- One or the other: Eliminates two incorrect answers, analogous to the 50:50 lifeline on the real game show.
- Pass the buck and chicken out: Give the question to another contestant or swap the question out for a new one, analogous to the Switch the Question lifeline on the original show.
- Fortune cookie: Gives the player a hint.

== Characters ==
- Egregious Philin, host and parody of Regis Philbin
- Sheik Abdul Chickpea, a Middle Eastern oil magnate
- Daisey Mae LePlume, a parody of Anna Nicole Smith
- Rich Littleweasel III, a generic trust fund kid
- Melvin Dotcom, a parody of Bill Gates
- Ronald Hump, a parody of Donald Trump

== Reception ==
Reception

Aggregate score
Aggregator	Score	
Aggregator	Dreamcast	PC
GameRankings	N/A	30%

Review scores
Publication	Score	
Publication	Dreamcast	PC
AllGame	1/5	1.5/5
CNET Gamecenter	N/A	3/10
Computer Games Strategy Plus	N/A	1.5/5
Electronic Gaming Monthly	1/10	N/A
EP Daily	N/A	2/10
GameSpot	N/A	5.4/10
IGN	N/A	5.7/10
PC Gamer (US)	N/A	15%
PC Zone	N/A	4%

The game received unfavorable reviews to overwhelming dislike on both platforms.
