= Power Spikes =

1988 video game

- Arcade flyer
- Developer: Video System
- Publishers: JP: Video System; NA: McO'River; EU: Ubi Soft (SNES)
- Platforms: Arcade, Super Nintendo Entertainment System
- Release: JP: April 1991; NA: 1991
- Genre: Sports
- Modes: Single-player, multiplayer

Power Spikes, released in Japan as Super Volley '91 (Note: Japanese: スーパーバレー '91, Hepburn: Sūpā Barē '91), is a 1991 volleyball video game developed and published by Video System for arcades. It is the sequel to Super Volleyball (1989). It was released in Japan in April 1991 and in North America the same year. It was ported to the Super Nintendo Entertainment System as Hyper V-Ball, which was released in Europe by Ubi Soft. It was followed by Power Spikes II in 1994.

Hamster Corporation acquired the game's rights alongside Video System's catalogue, releasing the game as part of their Arcade Archives series for the Nintendo Switch and PlayStation 4 in October 2024.

== Gameplay ==
Like its predecessor, Super Volleyball is a realistic rendition of volleyball, where players control individual volleyball players to cooperate properly and hit the ball. The player must receive the ball and pass it to their teammates, who can then hit the ball, scoring points when timed right and disallowing the opponents from deflecting the ball. Likewise, the players in the front can also deflect the ball with well-timed button presses. New serves are introduced to the game, while the Japanese version allows the player to switch between female and male teams. The SNES version includes robotic teams.

== Reception ==
Electronic Gaming Monthly noted that the SNES version "did an excellent job of conveying the sport of volleyball on a video game format and is sure to delight sports fans", regarding it as one of the best volleyball games.
