= Deer Avenger 2: Deer in the City =

1999 satirical video game

- Developer: Hypnotix
- Publisher: Simon & Schuster Interactive
- Series: Deer Avenger
- Platforms: Windows, Mac OS
- Release: NA: September 16, 1999; EU: 1999
- Genre: First-person shooter
- Modes: Single player, multiplayer

Deer Avenger 2: Deer in the City is a video game developed by Hypnotix and published by Simon & Schuster Interactive for Windows and Macintosh in 1999. It is the sequel to Deer Avenger.

== Development ==
Brian McCann, known for his frequent appearances on Late Night with Conan O'Brien, voiced the character Bambo and wrote jokes for Deer Avenger 2. According to Hypnotix founder Mike Taramykin, McCann recruited colleagues from NBC to be voice actors for the series. Tina Fey and Amy Poehler were among the actors to voice characters in Deer Avenger 2.

== Reception ==
Reception

Review scores
Publication	Score
AllGame	4/5
Computer Games Strategy Plus	1/5
Next Generation	2/5

The game received mixed reviews. John Lee of NextGen said that the game was "woefully short on gameplay, no question, but at least it's good for chuckles. Unless, of course, you're a hunter or a sports writer."
