= Beach Spikers =

2001 video game

- North American GameCube cover art
- Developer: Sega AM2
- Publisher: Sega
- Director: Hiroshi Masui
- Producer: Yu Suzuki
- Programmer: Hideki Tanaka
- Composers: Tatsutoshi Narita; Sachio Ogawa; Shinichi Goto; Fumio Ito; Megumi Takano
- Platforms: Arcade, GameCube
- Release: Arcade: JP: July 2001; GameCube: JP: July 19, 2002; NA: August 13, 2002; EU: September 27, 2002; AU: October 4, 2002
- Genre: Sports (beach volleyball)
- Modes: Single-player, multiplayer
- Arcade system: Sega NAOMI 2

Beach Spikers is a beach volleyball video game released in Japanese arcades in 2001. The game was developed in-house by Sega AM2 and published by Sega. A GameCube port, renamed Beach Spikers: Virtua Beach Volleyball, was released in 2002 for all regions.

== Gameplay ==
Based on the sport of beach volleyball, the game revolves around two-on-two matches where a volleyball is hit back and forth over a net until one side allows the ball to touch the ground. Similar to Sega's Virtua sports games, most of the gameplay in Beach Spikers is based around the concept of "charging" the strength of moves, judged by how long the button is held prior to release at the point of which the move is executed. There is a button for setting (passing) and a button for rallying (sending the ball over the net) which, combined with how long the button is held to determine strength, is the basis for the way the entire game is played.

There are two modes to choose from: Arcade Mode and World Tour mode. Arcade mode is a basic progression through a series of AI opponents, and in the multiplayer portion of Arcade Mode, it is head-to-head matches for up to four human players. In World Tour mode, the player takes a user-created team through a tournament, earning points as they go that allow them to increase the stats of their players and unlock player customization items, including some based on other Sega titles like Fighting Vipers and Space Channel 5. The player has the option to customize their own characters or choose a team from a specific country, such as the United States, Jamaica, Italy, and France, to name a few.

In World Tour mode, the player's AI-controlled partner can be trained in attributes including serving, receiving, attacking and blocking. The team also has a "teamwork percentage"; between matches, the player can respond to their partner's performance with comments that affect their relationship and teamwork.

== Development ==
In March 2001, Sega of America listed Beach Spikers among its upcoming Dreamcast releases. In May 2001, they showed Beach Spikers at a private arcade-industry event, with the game running on NAOMI 2. At E3, Yu Suzuki said Sega AM2 would be providing software for all current systems, including the GameCube. In a June 2001 interview with Japanese magazine Dorimaga, Sega AM2 head Yu Suzuki discussed the studio's decision to develop a beach volleyball game, describing a change of image as one of AM2's themes for the year. The magazine introduced Beach Spikers as a NAOMI 2 arcade title supporting up to four simultaneous players.

Beach Spikers was announced for GameCube on March 2002. Producer Yu Suzuki later explained that Beach Spikers was selected as AM2's first GameCube project as part of the studio's effort to develop software for each of the major contemporary consoles. AM2 already had projects planned for the PlayStation 2 and Xbox, while Suzuki considered developing an entirely original GameCube title comparatively risky and instead chose to adapt the established arcade game. According to Suzuki, converting the game from the NAOMI 2 hardware to the GameCube presented few difficulties. The development team consisted of both members of the original arcade staff and new personnel, and additional modes were created to increase the home version's replay value. The GameCube port added create a team, train the AI partner, four-player Versus play and additional training/minigame content.

== Reception ==
Reception

Aggregate score
Aggregator	Score
Metacritic	76/100

Review scores
Publication	Score
AllGame	2.5/5
Edge	6/10
Electronic Gaming Monthly	8/10
EP Daily	6.5/10
Eurogamer	7/10
Famitsu	30/40
Game Informer	5/10
GameRevolution	B
GameSpot	8.1/10
GameSpy	4.5/5
GameZone	7.7/10
IGN	8.2/10
Nintendo Power	4.1/5
X-Play	3/5
Maxim	7/10

The GameCube version received "generally favorable reviews" according to the review aggregation website Metacritic. GamePro said of the game, "Simple controls a la Virtua Tennis could have made Beach Spikers a classic, but its appeal is just relegated to those with enough patience and determination to unlock the myriad hidden bikinis." (Note: GamePro gave the GameCube version 4.5/5 for graphics, and three 3/5 scores for sound, control, and fun factor.) GameSpot praised the tight, intuitive arcade-style controls and visuals, comparing its accessibility with Virtua Tennis, while criticizing the repetitive announcer. Similarly, Nintendo World Report praised the pick-up-and-play gameplay and the four-player multiplayer, but felt the camera could make positioning awkward and considered the single-player game less enduring.

European reviews were generally positive. British publication Nintendo Official Magazine praised the game's multiplayer appeal, describing it as one of the console's most enjoyable multiplayer experiences, although it considered the single-player World Tour mode comparatively lacking in depth. French magazine Consoles + awarded the game 91%, commending its detailed graphics, intuitive controls and entertaining gameplay, which it compared favourably to Virtua Tennis. However, the magazine noted that the competitions lacked variety. German magazine MAN!AC awarded 86%, praising its visual presentation, accessible controls and multiplayer gameplay, while also highlighting the progression system in its single-player World Tour mode.

In Japan, Famitsu gave it a score of 30 out of 40. Game Machine ranked the game fifth on their Best Hit Games 25 video-game software chart in September 2001.

The same GameCube version was nominated for "Best Game No One Played on GameCube" and "Best Alternative Sports Game on GameCube" at GameSpot's Best and Worst of 2002 Awards, both of which went to Sega Soccer Slam and Tony Hawk's Pro Skater 4, respectively.

== See also ==
- Dead or Alive Xtreme Beach Volleyball
- Outlaw Volleyball
- Summer Heat Beach Volleyball
