= Summer Heat Beach Volleyball =

2003 video game

- Developer: Acclaim Studios Cheltenham
- Publisher: Acclaim Entertainment
- Platform: PlayStation 2
- Release: NA: June 30, 2003; EU: July 4, 2003
- Genre: Sports
- Modes: Single player, multiplayer

Summer Heat Beach Volleyball is a beach volleyball video game released by Acclaim in 2003 for the PlayStation 2 gaming console.

== Gameplay ==
Summer Heat follows the basic rules of the sport of beach volleyball. Two teams of two players each face off in a sectioned-off area of sand that serves as the playing area. One player serves the ball, and play begins. The objective is to land the ball on the ground within the play area of the other team's side. Players alternate hitting ("volleying") the ball, up to three volleys per turn, and the ball must travel over the net no later than the third hit. The game supports up to four players, though the use of a multitap accessory is required for three and four player games. Summer Heat is styled similarly to other arcade-style volleyball games of the era, where there is an emphasis on the sex appeal of the bikini-clad female characters as well as having the overall tone and atmosphere of a summer beach party.

== Music ==
Summer Heat's soundtrack features music from Pink, Sum 41, Kylie Minogue, Sprung Monkey, Freshmaka, and Suburban.

== Reception ==
Reception

Aggregate score
Aggregator	Score
Metacritic	65/100

Review scores
Publication	Score
AllGame	2.5/5
Edge	6/10
Electronic Gaming Monthly	6.33/10
Eurogamer	7/10
Game Informer	6.75/10
GamePro	3.5/5
GameSpot	7.2/10
GameSpy	3/5
GameZone	7/10
IGN	6.4/10
Official U.S. PlayStation Magazine	3.5/5
The Village Voice	6/10

The game was released during a period where volleyball video games were experiencing a period of renewed popularity for the first time in many years, although it received considerably less hype and critical praise than its contemporaries Beach Spikers, Dead or Alive Xtreme Beach Volleyball, and Outlaw Volleyball. It received "mixed" reviews according to the review aggregation website Metacritic.

The game was one of several poor-selling titles that would lead to Acclaim's bankruptcy in 2004.

== Future ==
In 2006, Canadian game publisher Throwback Entertainment acquired the property rights for Summer Heat Beach Volleyball from Acclaim. Throwback had planned on developing another Summer Heat volleyball game for release on the PlayStation 3 or Xbox 360, but there is no word on the status of such a game. Summer Heat Volleyball is expected to keep its identity and will not be dissolved or merged.
