= Joe Rosario =

American actor, writer and director (born 1959)

Joe Rosario (born January 6, 1959) is an American actor, writer and director. His appearances in television series include Ed, Law & Order: Special Victims Unit, and The Sopranos. Rosario produced the short film Together.
