= Outlaw Tennis =

2005 video game

- European Xbox cover art
- Developer: Hypnotix
- Publisher: Global Star Software
- Platforms: Xbox, PlayStation 2
- Release: Xbox: NA: July 26, 2005; EU: July 29, 2005; PlayStation 2: NA: July 26, 2005; EU: August 26, 2005; AU: September 9, 2005
- Genres: Sports, fighting
- Modes: Single player, multiplayer

Outlaw Tennis is a video game based on the sport of tennis published for the Xbox and PlayStation 2, and the last game in the Outlaw series to be released in 2005. Actor and political satirist Stephen Colbert provides the voice of the game's announcer.

== Game modes ==
- Quick Play – The player picks the court and difficulty, the game automatically picks an opponent. This is a quick way to get into a Classic Tennis Match without having to sort through all the options.
- Exhibition – This mode is a quick way for a player to get into a game of tennis, with 7 different Play Styles to choose from, and 12 customizable Play Style Settings to tailor the game to the player's wishes.
- Tour Mode – This mode is where the player unlocks characters, courts, clothing, accessories, racquets, and Drill Events. The player must take each Outlaw (character) and win five events. With 80 events, bonus videos, courts, and characters are unlocked. For the double events, a second player can be invited to help out.
- Outlaw Drills – Allows the player to improve their character's skills. This is essential when playing the Tour Mode. Through games that work on Serve, Accuracy, Power, Speed, Control, and Endurance, the player will need to improve on their abilities to make it through the big leagues on Tour Mode.

== Reception ==
Reception

Aggregate scores
Aggregator	Score	
Aggregator	PS2	Xbox
GameRankings	68.92%	70%
Metacritic	67/100	66/100

Review scores
Publication	Score	
Publication	PS2	Xbox
Eurogamer	N/A	7/10
Game Informer	6.5/10	6.5/10
GamePro	N/A	3/5
GameSpot	7.1/10	7.1/10
GameSpy	N/A	3/5
GameZone	N/A	7.2/10
IGN	7/10	7/10
Official U.S. PlayStation Magazine	3.5/5	N/A
Official Xbox Magazine (US)	N/A	8.6/10
VideoGamer.com	N/A	5/10
X-Play	N/A	2/5
Detroit Free Press	3/4	N/A
The Sydney Morning Herald	N/A	3.5/5

The game was met with average reception. GameRankings and Metacritic gave it a score of 70% and 66 out of 100 for the Xbox version, and 69% and 67 out of 100 for the PlayStation 2 version.

Detroit Free Press gave the PS2 version a score of three stars out of four and stated that "The online features, variety of characters and deep play modes [make] Outlaw Tennis a keeper -- especially at its cheap price." However, The Sydney Morning Herald gave the Xbox version a score of three-and-a-half stars out of five and said, "The outrageous characters, puerile gags and crass commentary provide chuckles but the jokes soon become stale. Player reactions after each point also quickly become tiresome." Maxim gave both versions of the game three stars out of five and stated that the game "plays as well as a regulation tennis game. It has the same responsive controls, and even lets you play online doubles with your friends -- assuming they're more likely to chug a Country Club than apply to one."
