= Power Spikes II =

1994 video game

- Arcade flyer
- Developer: Video System
- Publishers: Taito; Video System (Neo Geo CD)
- Producer: Koji Furukawa
- Designer: Takumi Matsui
- Composer: Soshi Hosoi
- Platforms: Arcade, Neo Geo CD
- Release: WW: October 19, 1994
- Genre: Sports
- Modes: Single-player, multiplayer
- Arcade system: Neo Geo MVS

Power Spikes II (Note: Japanese: パワースパイクスII, Hepburn: Pawā Supaikusu II) is a 1994 volleyball video game developed by Video System and published by Taito for the Neo Geo arcade platform. It is the sequel to Power Spikes (1991). It was first launched for Neo Geo MVS (arcade) and later ported to Neo Geo CD. It is the final installment in the Super Volleyball series. It is also the only volleyball game released on the Neo Geo.

In the game, players have the choice to compete across any of the game modes available with either AI-controlled opponents or against other human players. Headed by Aero Fighters Assault producer Koji Furukawa, Power Spikes II was created by most of the same team that would later work on several projects at Video System such as later entries in the Aero Fighters franchise.

The game has since been re-released through download services for various consoles. Hamster Corporation acquired the game's rights alongside Video System's catalogue, re-releasing the game as part of their ACA Neo Geo series for the PlayStation 4, Xbox One, Nintendo Switch, Windows, Android and iOS. It received mixed reception from critics and reviewers alike since its initial launch.

== Gameplay ==
Gameplays screenshot.

Power Spikes II is a five-on-five volleyball game similar to previous volleyball titles from Video System, where players take control of any team in a series of matches on indoor courts. Most of the rules from the sport are present in the title, though they can be modified in the options menu along with other settings that alters the matches. The player controls a team of five players, two at the net and three in back. The player serves the ball into play by pressing the same action button twice. During gameplay, players are able to apply skills such as serve, pass, set, attack and block the incoming ball for offensive and defensive purposes respectively in order to score points. Some of the gameplay options found within the game include tournaments mode where either male or female teams must be faced in order to become the emerging champion. Returning from Hyper V-Ball is Hyper Mode as "Hyper League", which is a league for robots and takes place in futuristic courts.

== Development and release ==
Power Spikes II was created by most of the same team that would later work on several projects at Video System such as later entries in the Aero Fighters franchise, with Koji Furukawa serving as producer. Takumi Matsui served as chief designer, while the soundtrack was composed by Soshi Hosoi. Several other people also collaborated in its development. The game was first released by Taito for the Neo Geo MVS and was later ported to the Neo Geo CD by Video System. Prior to launch, the project went under the name Super Volley '94.

== Reception ==
Reception

Aggregate score
Aggregator	Score
GameRankings	(NS) 50%

Review scores
Publication	Score
AllGame	(NG) 2/5
HobbyConsolas	(NGCD) 79/100
M! Games	(NG) 40%
Nintendo Life	(NS) 5/10
Superjuegos	(NGCD) 70/100
Video Games (DE)	(NG) 48%

Power Spikes II received mixed reception from critics and reviewers alike since launch. The Nintendo Switch version holds a 50% on the video game review aggregator GameRankings.

AllGame's Kyle Knight felt mixed in regards to multiple aspects of Power Spikes II, commending the visual presentation of "Hyper League" mode but panned the visual department of regular mode for being poor and criticized the audio design. However, Knight noted that the gameplay in regular mode was more enjoyable than that of "Hyper League" mode but ultimately regarded the game as disappointing. Hobby Consolas' Sonia Herranz reviewed the Neo Geo CD version, commending the ability to play doubles and number of leagues but felit mixed in regards to the audiovisual presentation, criticizing the low number of teams per league, slow pacing and limited movement, stating that the title "neither impresses with its appearance, nor captivates with its playability." MAN!AC's Martin Gaksch regarded the addition of "Hyper League" as interesting but felt it was not as refined as Super Baseball 2020. Gaksch criticized the viewing perspective for being suboptimal and restrictive, as well as the graphics for being unimaginative and sound, stating that "what began with great play eight years ago with great volleyball ends quite embarrassingly with Video System's second Power Spikes."

Nintendo Life's Dave Frear reviewed the Nintendo Switch re-release, stating that "Power Spikes II is a little too simple to offer long term appeal." Frear commended the visual presentation but regarded it as simple when compared to other released on Neo Geo and criticized its simplified take on volleyball. Superjuegos' Javier Iturrioz also reviewed the Neo Geo CD version, criticizing graphics for the small size of sprites, lack of variety and forced screen scrolling. Iturrioz also felt that the game did not take advantage of the CD format in terms of audio design. He commended the inclusion of special moves when playing "Hyper League" mode but criticized the lack of additional actions during gameplay. German magazine Video Games stated in their review that "With this volleyball simulation programmed by Videosystems, Taito is now producing its first Neo-Geo product. The Japanese, however, knew why they waited so long, because Powerspikes 2 is anything but substantial in terms of fun."
