= Dealbreakers Talk Show No. 0001 =

"Dealbreakers Talk Show #0001"
- 30 Rock episode
- Episode no.: Season 4 Episode 7
- Directed by: Don Scardino
- Written by: Kay Cannon
- Production code: 407
- Original air date: December 3, 2009

Guest appearances
- Kristian Alfonso as Hope Brady; John Anderson as Astronaut Mike Dexter; Will Arnett as Devon Banks; Whoopi Goldberg as herself; Chris Parnell as Dr. Leo Spaceman; Peter Reckell as Bo Brady; Sherri Shepherd as Angie Jordan

Episode chronology
← Previous "Sun Tea"	Next → "Secret Santa"
- 30 Rock season 4

"Dealbreakers Talk Show #0001" is the seventh episode of the fourth season of the American television comedy series 30 Rock, and the 65th overall episode of the series. It was written by co-producer Kay Cannon and directed by series producer Don Scardino. It originally aired on NBC in the United States on December 3, 2009. Guest stars in the episode include Kristian Alfonso, John Anderson, Will Arnett, Whoopi Goldberg, Chris Parnell, Peter Reckell, and Sherri Shepherd.

In the episode, Liz Lemon (Tina Fey) starts her first day on her talk show Dealbreakers and appoints Frank Rossitano (Judah Friedlander) to replace her as the head writer of the fictional sketch comedy show The Girlie Show with Tracy Jordan (TGS). Meanwhile, Tracy Jordan (Tracy Morgan) tries to achieve an EGOT by winning the four awards: an Emmy, a Grammy, an Oscar, and a Tony.

"Dealbreakers Talk Show #0001" has received generally positive reception from television critics. According to Nielsen Media Research, the episode was watched by 6.2 million households during its original broadcast, and received a 3.0 rating/8 share among viewers in the 18–49 demographic. 30 Rock editor Ken Eluto received a Primetime Emmy Award nomination in the category of Outstanding Single-Camera Picture Editing for a Comedy Series for his work in this episode. "Dealbreakers Talk Show #0001" was submitted for consideration on the behalf of Tina Fey for the Outstanding Lead Actress in a Comedy Series Emmy.

== Plot ==
The episode opens with Jack Donaghy (Alec Baldwin) and Liz Lemon (Tina Fey) preparing for the beginning of her new talk show, Dealbreakers. Jack's rival, Devon Banks (Will Arnett), complicates the situation by threatening to publicly ridicule Jack if the show loses money. Jack, under pressure, begins to interfere with Liz's appearance, sending her over the edge with insecurity. After 510 takes, they finally settle on an opening title to the show. After Liz locks herself in her dressing room, Jack shuts Dealbreakers down, but manages to break even by selling the show's opening titles; in future, whenever a television show is playing in the background of a Sheinhardt-Universal soap opera, the Dealbreakers titles will be shown.

Meanwhile, Tracy Jordan (Tracy Morgan) realizes that although he has two sons with his wife Angie (Sherri Shepherd), what is missing from his life is a daughter. As he shops for a special Christmas present for Angie, to try to convince her to have another child, Tracy finds a diamond-encrusted "EGOT" necklace and sets a new life goal to achieve EGOT status by winning four major awards: an Emmy, a Grammy, an Oscar, and a Tony. Tracy discovers many EGOT-ers have been composers and aspires to write the most popular song of all time. The "EGOT" necklace originally belonged to Philip Michael Thomas of Miami Vice. After failing to combine five popular musical styles into one song, he seeks help from Whoopi Goldberg, an EGOT title holder. Tracy sings his song to Angie and she is so moved she agrees to have another child.

At the same time, TGS with Tracy Jordan staff writer Frank Rossitano (Judah Friedlander) is appointed head writer of the show in Liz's absence. He accepts the role, thinking that there is finally "a cool person in charge". As the day progresses, he begins acting and dressing just like Liz. After Liz returns to TGS, Frank begs her never to leave again.

== Production ==
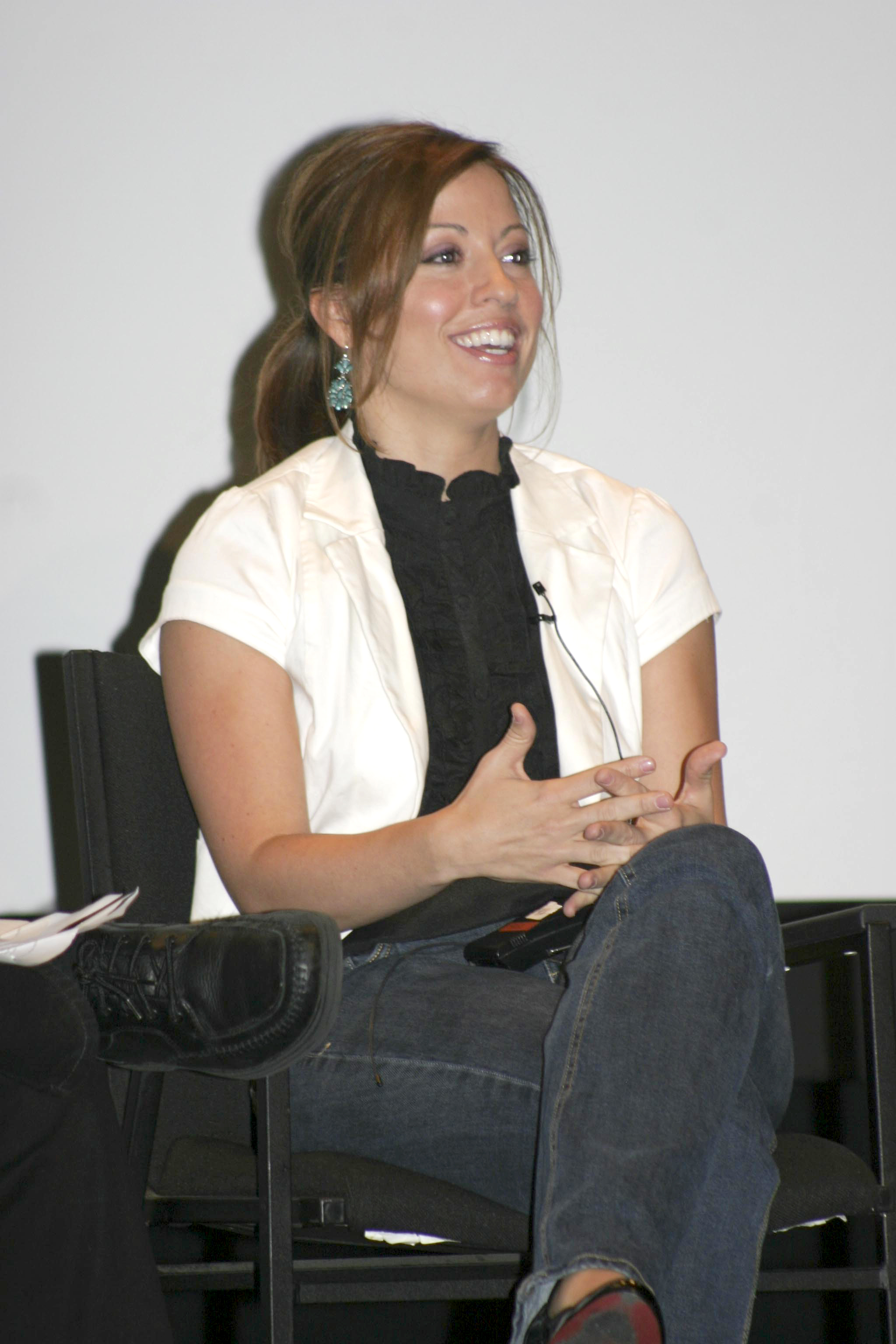
Kay Cannon (pictured) penned this episode of 30 Rock.

"Dealbreakers Talk Show #0001" was written by co-producer Kay Cannon and directed by series producer Don Scardino. This episode was Cannon's fifth writing credit, preceded by "Black Tie", "Somebody to Love", "Christmas Special", and "Jackie Jormp-Jomp". This was Scardino's twenty-fourth directed episode. "Dealbreakers Talk Show #0001" originally aired on December 3, 2009, on NBC in the United States as the seventh episode of the show's fourth season and the 65th overall episode of the series.

This episode of 30 Rock was filmed on October 28 and November 18, 2009. Comedian actors Will Arnett and Sherri Shepherd reprised their roles as Devon Banks and Angie Jordan, respectively, each for the sixth time. Actress Whoopi Goldberg returned to the show for the second time playing herself; in this episode Tracy Jordan enlists her help with his EGOT plans. Goldberg first appeared in the show's first season episode "The Rural Juror", which also established that despite her success as the head writer of TGS, Liz wants to be an on-camera performer like Jenna. Comic actor Chris Parnell played Dr. Leo Spaceman in this episode, in which Liz Lemon visits Dr. Spaceman for Lasik surgery. Actors Kristian Alfonso and Peter Reckell, who star in the daytime soap opera Days of Our Lives—another NBC program—played their Days of our Lives characters Hope Brady and Bo Brady, respectively; the two appear at the end of "Dealbreakers Talk Show #0001", in a Days of our Lives episode that Liz is watching. In the background of their scene, a television can be seen playing the opening titles Liz filmed for Dealbreakers. Actor John Anderson made his 30 Rock debut as Astronaut Mike Dexter, Liz's imaginary perfect husband. In the beginning of the episode, Liz, who is fantasizing about her life, is notified by Mike Dexter that he has to go back to outer space. The character was first referenced in the previous episode, "Sun Tea", although Anderson did not play the character, instead "Dot Com" Slattery (Kevin Brown) pretended to be Mike Dexter, Liz's "crazy black boyfriend". This is the first episode where John Lutz received star billing.

Tracy's storyline of achieving EGOT status was first mentioned in this episode, and would continue throughout the season. In one scene from the episode, NBC page Kenneth Parcell (Jack McBrayer) appears as a Muppet while walking by a high-definition camera, a reference to season three episode "Apollo, Apollo" in which Kenneth sees everyone as muppets. In addition, Jack Donaghy (Alec Baldwin) walks by the camera and is seen as a younger version of himself. The footage shown on the high-definition monitor was extracted from the 1990 film The Hunt for Red October starring Baldwin. This episode was the final time that the show referenced Liz's show Dealbreakers, a story arc that had begun in the third-season episode "Mamma Mia" and continued with "Kidney Now!", "Into the Crevasse" and "The Problem Solvers".

== Reception ==
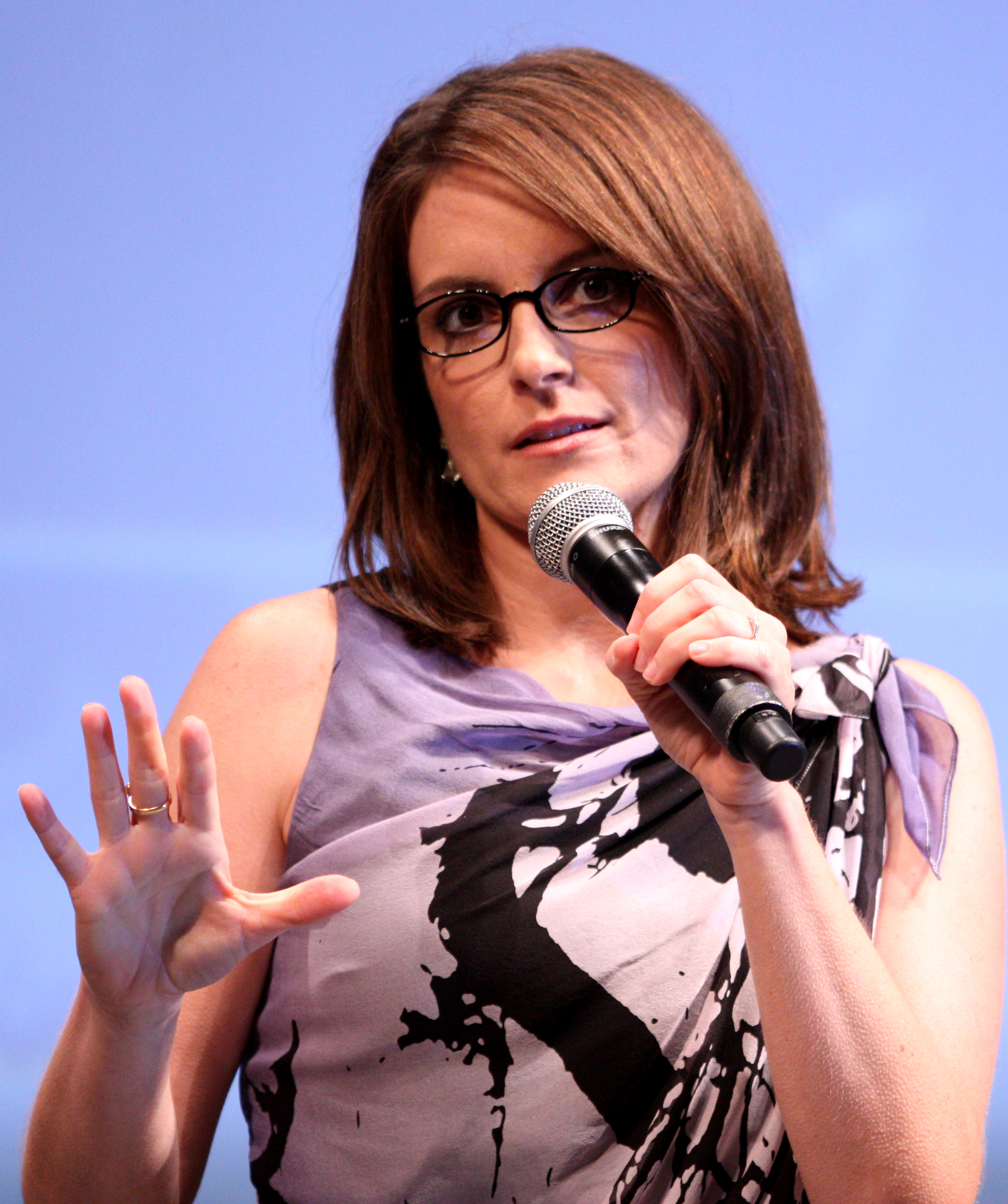
Tina Fey received an Emmy nomination for Outstanding Lead Actress in a Comedy Series for her performance in this episode.

In its original American broadcast, "Dealbreakers Talk Show #0001" drew in 6.2 million households, according to the Nielsen Media Research. This amounted to a seven percent ratings increase over the previous week's episode, "Sun Tea", which was seen by 5.858 million American viewers. The show claimed a 3.0 rating/8 share among viewers in the 18–49 demographic, that is 3.0 percent of all people in that group, and 8 percent of all people from that group watching television at the time, watched the episode. Ken Eluto, an editor on the show, received a Primetime Emmy Award nomination for Outstanding Single-Camera Picture Editing for a Comedy Series at the 62nd Primetime Emmy Awards, but lost it to Ryan Case for his work on the pilot episode of Modern Family. "Dealbreakers Talk Show #0001" was submitted for consideration on the behalf of Tina Fey for Outstanding Lead Actress in a Comedy Series at the same awards show, but lost it to actress Edie Falco. This episode of 30 Rock has received generally positive reviews.

Robert Canning of IGN gave the episode an 8.9 out of 10 rating and wrote that the plotlines featured here were "fun, but it was, as is often the case, Liz and Jack that really made [the episode] a winner." Television columnist Alan Sepinwall for The Star-Ledger said that Frank turning into Liz "felt a little too predictable", nonetheless complimented Judah Friedlander for it. Regarding the episode itself, Sepinwall wrote that it was a "great story, and a much better closing point to the 'Dealbreakers' plot". Bob Sassone of AOL's TV Squad objected to the jokes about Liz and Fey being unattractive, but was glad that Liz did not get her talk show, reasoning it would have "ruin[ed] the whole Liz/Jack/TGS dynamic." Time contributor James Poniewozik was complimentary towards the "Dealbreakers" story, and commented that the series "has often been strongest in the episodes in which Liz Lemon's professional life tracks Tina Fey's, and 'Dealbreakers' was definitely one of them." In conclusion, Poniewozik said that despite this not being "an all-time classic" it was "one of the most laugh-full 30 Rock's in a while". TV Guide's Michael Anthony reported that part of him really wanted to see the Dealbreaker pilot work out for Liz, noting "I think there's something there – something really funny!" Anthony was complimentary towards Whoopi Goldberg's cameo, and said that when the Jenna character "opens her mouth" she is a "hysterical treat."

Nathan Rabin of The A.V. Club wrote that "Dealbreakers Talk Show #0001" was a "delightful surprise, delivering laughs aplenty and steering clear of the pitfalls that have hindered the show so far this year. [...] It was a welcome return to form chockablock with quotable lines and laugh out loud moments." He was complimentary towards Fey here, noting that she "illustrated [her] chops as a physical comedian". Sean Gandert, a contributor for Paste magazine, said that Tracy's plot was "pretty awesome". Gandert, who has not been a fan of the "Dealbreakers" storyline, appreciated it in this episode, opining it had "good writing even by the show's outsized standards." Entertainment Weekly contributor Margaret Lyons was positive about this episode, writing "Last night's 30 Rock was legitimately one of the best episodes ever [...] 'Dealbreakers Talk Show #0001' was one for the record books".
