= The C Word (30 Rock) =

- 30 Rock episode
- Episode no.: Season 1 Episode 14
- Directed by: Adam Bernstein
- Written by: Tina Fey
- Production code: 106
- Original air date: February 15, 2007

Guest appearances
- Kevin Brown as Dot Com Slattery; Grizz Chapman as Grizz Griswold; Rachel Dratch as Greta Johanssen; John Lutz as J.D. Lutz; Keith Powell as Toofer Spurlock; Lonny Ross as Josh Girard; Rip Torn as Don Geiss; Lo Mutuc as Grace Park

Episode chronology
← Previous "Up All Night"	Next → "Hard Ball"
- 30 Rock season 1

"The C Word" is the 14th episode of the first season of the American television comedy series 30 Rock. It was written by series creator Tina Fey and directed by Adam Bernstein. The episode originally aired on NBC in the United States on February 15, 2007. Guest stars in this episode include Kevin Brown, Grizz Chapman, Rachel Dratch, John Lutz, Keith Powell, Lonny Ross, Rip Torn, and Lo Mutac (Note: Credited as Charlyne Yi).

In the episode, after being criticized for her working habits by her co-workers, head writer Liz Lemon (Fey) decides to be more lenient with her writing staff. Meanwhile, Jack Donaghy (Alec Baldwin) brings Tracy Jordan (Tracy Morgan) to a major golf event to get closer to Don Geiss (Torn), the CEO of General Electric (GE), but his plan backfires when Tracy decides to drop "truth bombs".

"The C Word" has received generally positive reviews from television critics. According to the Nielsen ratings system, the episode was watched by 5.0 million households during its original broadcast, and received a 2.5 rating/6 share among viewers in the 18–49 demographic.

== Plot ==
Jack Donaghy (Alec Baldwin), Vice President of East Coast Television and Microwave Oven Programming for General Electric (GE), invites Tracy Jordan (Tracy Morgan) to a GE diabetes charity golf event. Jack hopes that bringing Tracy along can help him get close to GE CEO Don Geiss (Rip Torn). At the event, Tracy becomes the hit of the party, but quickly begins to feel that the reason he was brought along was to be "the funny black man". Tracy insults Geiss by accusing him of not hiring more black people, which results in Tracy and Jack not being invited to golf along with Geiss. Jack blames Tracy for this, but Tracy doesn't care, as he tells Jack that he cannot help but drop "truth bombs". Jack explains to Tracy that his failure to "play the game" with movie producers in the past has ended his movie career. Later, to make amends with both Jack and Geiss, Tracy gives a heartfelt speech about his daughter battling diabetes, which moves Geiss. This results in Geiss inviting Jack, Tracy, and Tracy's daughter to the Vineyard. Tracy admits to Jack that he does not have a daughter, which prompts Jack to say, "Let's have a casting session on Monday."

Meanwhile, at the 30 Rock studios, TGS with Tracy Jordan head writer Liz Lemon (Tina Fey) and her writing staff are discussing potential topics to use in the show. J. D. Lutz (John Lutz) suggests one of his sketches, "Dancing with the Hobos", which Liz criticizes, thus embarrassing him in front of everyone. Later, Liz talks to Greta Johansen (Rachel Dratch), the show's cat wrangler. At the same time, she overhears Lutz calling her the C word. Outraged by this, Liz tells Pete Hornberger (Scott Adsit) and Frank Rossitano (Judah Friedlander) about what Lutz called her and wants to fire him. Frank reveals that Lutz's poor behavior is due to the passing of his grandmother. After it is pointed out that she has been a terrible boss to the staff, Liz begins acting nice, but this backfires when they take advantage of her. Angered by this, Liz confronts the writers about their actions, and tells Lutz she knows what he called her. Liz warns all of them that if they call her that "horrible word" she will fire them.

At the same time, Kenneth Parcell (Jack McBrayer) struggles with his feelings for another page, Grace Park (Lo Mutac) who demonstrates affection for him. Kenneth explains to Pete that he is afraid of "disgracing the peacock" by becoming romantically involved with her. Throughout the episode, it is shown to be sexually awkward for the two of them during their job, though towards the end, Kenneth confronts her with his feelings about her. Their kiss is interrupted by Kenneth's work, which allows him to abruptly forget about her.

== Production ==
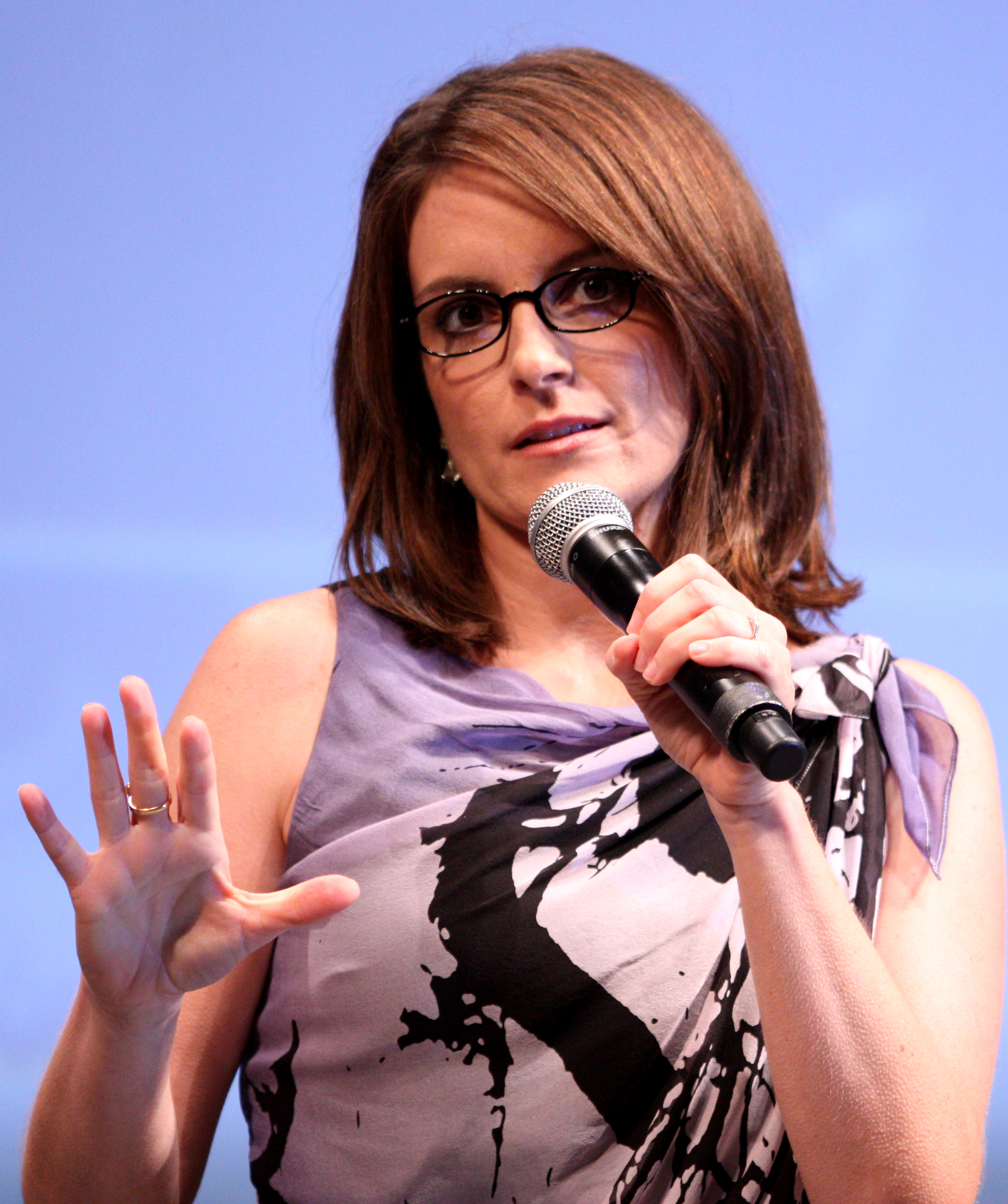
"The C Word" was written by series creator Tina Fey.

"The C Word" was written by series creator, executive producer and lead actress Tina Fey, making it her seventh writing credit after the pilot episode, "The Aftermath", "Tracy Does Conan", "The Head and the Hair", "Black Tie", and "Up All Night". The episode was directed by supervising producer Adam Bernstein, making it his fifth for the series. "The C Word" originally aired on NBC in the United States on February 15, 2007, as the fourteenth episode of the show's first season.

In an April 2007 interview with Entertainment Weekly, Fey revealed that she was once called "the c word" by one of her writers at Saturday Night Live. In discussion of this, she said, "That C-word thing actually did happen. I was furious, and I had this weird reaction where I kept saying, 'You can't say that! My parents love me!'" She said the episode "was a little bit based on the experience of having someone call you that and not knowing how to deal with it." In December 2015, Fey revealed that the writer who had called her "the c word" was Colin Quinn.

"The C Word" was actor Rip Torn's debut as GE CEO Don Geiss.

== Reception ==
In its original American broadcast, "The C Word" was watched by 5.0 million households, according to the Nielsen ratings system. It earned a 2.5 rating/6 share in the 18–49 demographic. This means that it was seen by 2.5 percent of all 18- to 49-year-olds, and 6 percent of all 18- to 49-year-olds watching television at the time of the broadcast. This was a decrease from the previous episode, "Up All Night", which was watched by 5.2 million American viewers.

IGN contributor Robert Canning, wrote, "Even in an episode like 'The 'C' Word,' where some of the ideas fall a bit short, there were still plenty of laugh-out-loud moments to talk about. [...] In the end, the great writing outweighed the slightly bothersome contrivances to make this yet another laugh-filled episode of 30 Rock." He said that the pairing of Jack and Tracy "gave us another opportunity to enjoy the pairing of the polar opposite personalities". Canning reported that the Liz plot had "its funny moments", but opined that it was hard to "get past the fact this wasn't exactly the Liz we knew", in regards to her being a "domineering boss that cares little about her employees." Canning gave the episode a 7.8 out of 10 rating. Julia Ward of AOL's TV Squad wrote that putting Alec Baldwin and Rip Torn together "was a genius move." She was complimentary towards Tina Fey, citing that it was "another great week" in her "continuing portrayal of what being a hard-working gal is actually like." Ward enjoyed Tracy's speech, noting that it was "priceless", and was glad to see him having "ample screen time ... which was a nice change of pace." TV Guide's Matt Mitovich wrote he enjoyed all of the episode's storyline pairings, but much enjoyed Jack and Tracy. Further in his recap, Mitovich reported that Liz's plot could have been better had the comedy show How I Met Your Mother "not gone there with the C-word" in an episode. Though, he said that Liz's story "had a fitting message – that she is held to a different standard, yet shouldn't be, as a female head writer. Plus, her story gave us that winning flurry of flashbacks to times when she was a... not very nice lady."
