= The Head and the Hair =

- 30 Rock episode
- Episode no.: Season 1 Episode 11
- Directed by: Gail Mancuso
- Written by: Tina Fey; John Riggi
- Production code: 112
- Original air date: January 18, 2007

Episode chronology
← Previous "The Rural Juror"	Next → "Black Tie"
- 30 Rock season 1

"The Head and the Hair" is the eleventh episode of the first season of the American television comedy series 30 Rock. It was written by series creator Tina Fey and co-executive producer John Riggi. The director of this episode was Gail Mancuso. It originally aired on NBC in the United States on January 18, 2007. Guest stars in this episode include Katrina Bowden, Craig Castaldo, Peter Hermann, Brian McCann, John McEnroe, Maulik Pancholy, Keith Powell, and Lonny Ross.

In the episode, two men, one a cerebral nerd (McCann) and the other a gorgeous hunk (Hermann), capture the attention of Liz Lemon (Tina Fey) and Jenna Maroney (Jane Krakowski). Meanwhile, Jack Donaghy (Alec Baldwin) and Kenneth Parcell (Jack McBrayer) trade places for "Bottom's Up Day" at the office and at the same time, Tracy Jordan (Tracy Morgan) enlists Frank Rossitano (Judah Friedlander) and James "Toofer" Spurlock (Powell) to write his autobiography in one day.

== Plot ==
Liz and Jenna keep running into the same two men in the elevator at the 30 Rock building, and find themselves interested in them. Not knowing their names, Liz and Jenna refer to them as "The Head" (Brian McCann) and "The Hair" (Peter Hermann). Jenna and Pete Hornberger (Scott Adsit) persuade Liz to ask out The Head, a low-maintenance and harmless geek, but as she goes to do so, she runs into The Hair (named Gray), a suave and handsome charmer, who asks her out instead. Liz hesitates due to their perceived incompatibility, but agrees to try new things. Their date at a hip restaurant opening seems to evidence their incompatibility, but she realises they have more in common than she thought when they have the same reaction to a difficult shop owner. On their second date, Liz lets herself be charmed by Gray until she finds a picture of her great-aunt in his apartment and they learn that they are related.

Meanwhile, Tracy panics in the TGS with Tracy Jordan staff office, as his autobiography is due to a publisher the next day but he has not yet begun to write it. He engages Frank and James "Toofer" Spurlock (Keith Powell) to help him get it done in time. Despite Tracy's lack of memory of his own life, they work non-stop on the project and have it finished when Tracy remembers that the publisher actually rejected his autobiography.

Finally, General Electric Executive Vice-president Jack and NBC page Kenneth are participating in "Bottoms Up" day at the office. Jack must work in Kenneth's job for a day, to help him be a better manager. Disillusioned by the menial nature of Kenneth's job, Jack tries to get Kenneth a better role in another division, but insults Kenneth in the process. Kenneth reveals that he adores television and those who make it more than anything, and he puts up with the menial job to support the industry. Jack admires Kenneth's passion and asks his opinion on television content, something Jack has been struggling with. Inspired by Kenneth's idea, a game show called Gold Case, Jack helps him sell it to NBC, but the show quickly runs into problems when the immense weight of the gold reveals its location to the contestants. The show is quickly cancelled.

== Production ==
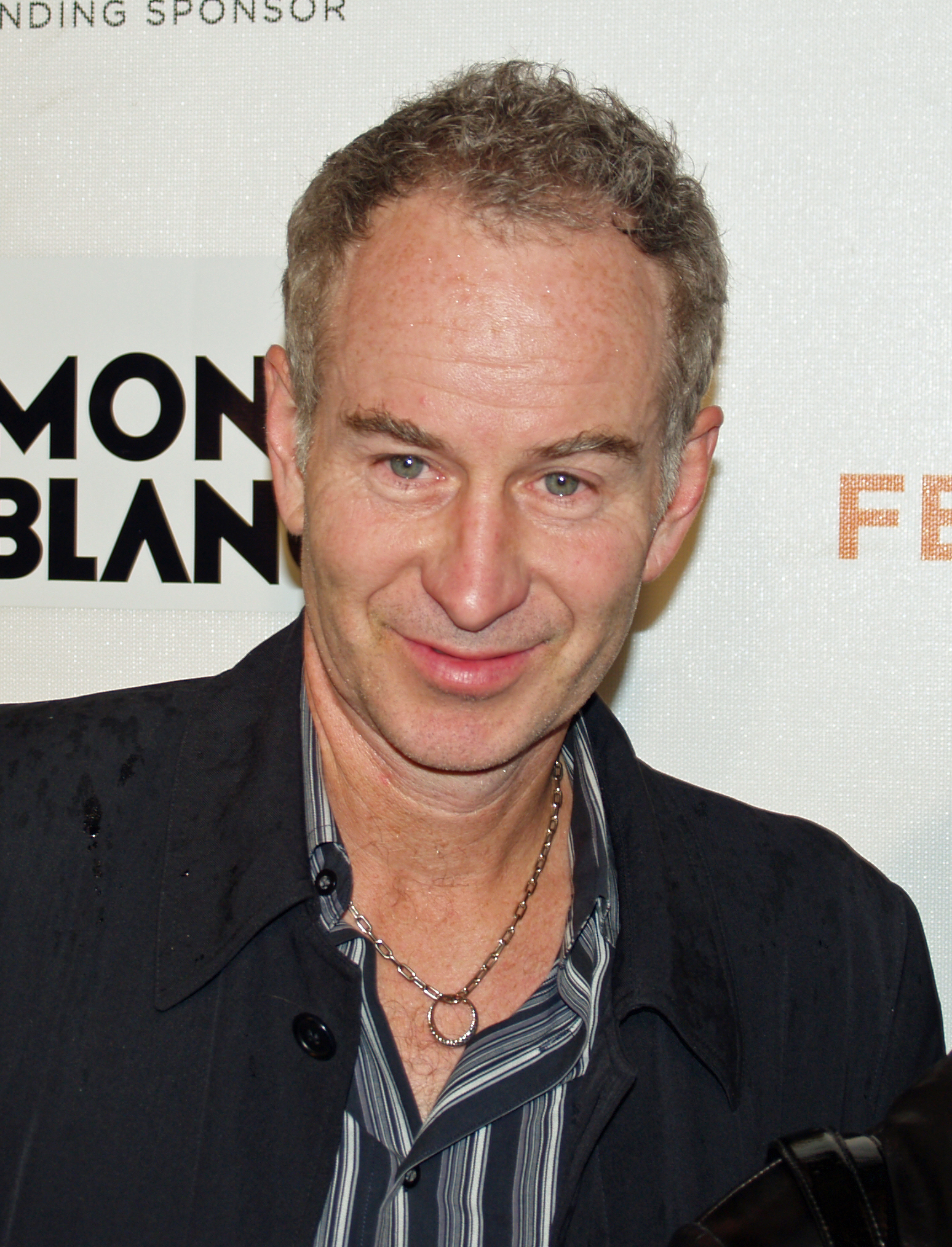
John McEnroe played himself in this episode as the host of the game show Gold Case.

"The Head and the Hair" was written by series' creator, executive producer and lead actress Tina Fey and co-executive producer John Riggi. The director of this episode was Don Scardino. This was Fey and Riggi's first script collaboration, and they later co-wrote the season three episode "The Natural Order". "The Head and the Hair" originally aired on NBC in the United States on January 18, 2007, as the eleventh episode of the show's first season and overall of the series.

This episode featured guest appearances from actors Brian McCann and Peter Hermann, in which McCann played "The Head" and Hermann "The Hair". Former professional tennis player John McEnroe played himself in the episode, in which he hosts the game show Gold Case. McEnroe would later guest star as himself in the November 20, 2008, 30 Rock episode "Gavin Volure". In one scene of this episode, Kenneth runs into a man named "Moonvest", and tells him that he got an idea for a television game show, but Moonvest tells him "Give me your fingernails". Moonvest was played by Craig Castaldo, who is also known as Radio Man.

One filmed scene from "The Head and the Hair" was cut out from the airing. Instead, the scene was featured on 30 Rock's season 1 DVD as part of the deleted scenes in the Bonus feature. In the scene, Pete is visibly upset that someone added paper in the regular garbage and demands to know who did it, as NBC recycles. Jack and Kenneth show up. Jack apologizes for throwing the paper in the regular garbage, which results in Pete telling him to go through the garbage by hand and "fish out anything that's recyclable", as Jack is dressed as a page, in which he is participating on "Bottoms Up" day.

In the scene where Tracy is on his bacon run, every mention of January 17 is either shot so the actor's mouth is hidden or dubbed over. This can be seen most clearly when Cerie says January 17. It seems the original was February 17 but later changed to match the release date of the episode. Closed captioning still shows February 17.

== Cultural references ==
In one of the scenes of the episode, Kenneth is in news anchor Brian Williams's dressing room. There, Kenneth is seeing cleaning out a half-cleaned graffiti that reads "Kat Cou Suc", a reference to fellow news host Katie Couric. Williams' has been on the series, having appeared in the season three episode "The Ones", in which Tracy has been giving out Williams's phone number instead of his. He next appeared in the season four episode "Audition Day", as he is auditioning to become a cast member on TGS. Williams appeared in "Future Husband" in which he tells the CNBC staff that his news program Nightly News "rules".

There are frequent references to Star Wars in 30 Rock, beginning with the pilot episode in 2006 where Tracy is seen shouting that he is a Jedi. Liz admits to being a huge fan of Star Wars, saying that she had watched it many times with Pete Hornberger (Scott Adsit), and dressed up as the Star Wars character Princess Leia during four recent Halloweens. There is also reference to Star Wars when Tracy takes on the identity of the character Chewbacca. In "The Head and the Hair", Liz tells Jenna that "The Hair" asked her out and says "I had to say yes. I mean he looked at me with those handsome guys eyes. It was like the Death Star tractor beam when the Falcon was...", until Jenna interrupts her and says "No Liz, do not talk about that stuff on your date. Guys like that do not like Star Trek", to which Liz corrects "Wars!" Fey, a fan of Star Wars herself, said that the weekly Star Wars joke or reference "started happening organically" when the crew realized that they had a Star Wars reference "in almost every show". Fey said that from then on "it became a thing where [they] tried to keep it going", and that even though they could not include one in every episode, they still had a "pretty high batting average". Fey attributed most of the references to executive producer and writer Robert Carlock, whom she described as "the resident expert".

== Reception ==
In its original American broadcast, "The Head and the Hair" was watched by 5.0 million households, according to the Nielsen ratings system. It earned a 2.4 rating/6 share in the 18–49 demographic, meaning that 2.4 percent of all people in that group, and 6 percent of all people from that group watching television at the time, watched the episode. This was a decrease from the previous episode, "The Rural Juror", which was watched by 6.1 million American viewers. Since airing, the episode has received generally good reception from television critics.

Television columnist Alan Sepinwall for The Star-Ledger said that 30 Rock "feels like a show that's already made The Leap midway through season one." He reported that Tracy's story was "largely a dud", but said that the two other plots were "so funny" that it would not matter much. Sepinwall said "The Head and the Hair" was "splendid". Julia Ward of AOL's TV Squad was complimentary towards Alec Baldwin's Jack in this episode, citing that he knows "how to squeeze some serious funny out of a simple gesture and a pause." She added that his "lingering stare" at both Jenna and Liz after taking their drink order "was the funniest moment in a very funny episode". Ward also enjoyed that it "brought us maximum Kenneth, which is great. He's turning out to be one of the show's most endearing characters." IGN contributor Robert Canning wrote that the pairing of Jack and Kenneth was a "great idea and gave Kenneth his best episode" since "Blind Date". In regards to Liz's story, he commented it was "her strongest episodes to date", and said that it "felt good" to see her "have a little luck for a change" with "The Head". In conclusion, Canning gave the episode an 8.0 out of 10 rating. TV Guide's Matt Mitovich disliked that NBC "utterly ruined" the outcome of Liz's plot in the promos, though, said that it was a "very funny resolution to the relationship that was too good, and too well coiffed, to be true." Mitovich said that it was "fun" to see Liz successfully date "while it lasted".
