= Hard Ball =

- 30 Rock episode
- Episode no.: Season 1 Episode 15
- Directed by: Don Scardino
- Written by: Matt Hubbard
- Cinematography by: Vanja Černjul
- Production code: 115
- Original air date: February 22, 2007

Guest appearances
- David Alan Basche as Alan; Gregg Bello as The Daily Show Producer; Katrina Bowden as Cerie Xerox; Kevin Brown as Dot Com Slattery; Tucker Carlson as Himself; Grizz Chapman as Gris Griswold; Rachel Dratch as Martha Blanch; Chris Matthews as Himself; Keith Powell as Toofer Spurlock; Lonny Ross as Josh Girard; Gregory Wooddell as Mike

Episode chronology
← Previous "The C Word"	Next → "The Source Awards"
- 30 Rock season 1

"Hard Ball" (also known as "Negotiation") is the fifteenth episode of NBC's first season of 30 Rock. It was written by one of the season's co-producers, Matt Hubbard, and directed by one of the season's supervising producers, Don Scardino. It aired on February 22, 2007 in the United States. Guest stars who appeared in the episode were David Alan Basche, Gregg Bello, Katrina Bowden, Kevin Brown, Grizz Chapman, Rachel Dratch, Keith Powell, Lonny Ross and Gregory Wooddell. Tucker Carlson and Chris Matthews also appear as themselves in the episode.

The episode focuses on Jenna Maroney (Jane Krakowski) trying to clear her name after being misquoted in an interview for Maxim Magazine. Jack Donaghy (Alec Baldwin) begins negotiations to Josh Girard's (Lonny Ross) new contract. Kenneth Parcell (Jack McBrayer) becomes the newest member of Tracy Jordan's (Tracy Morgan) entourage.

== Plot ==
When Josh's contract is due for renewal, Jack is looking to save money with the negotiation, so Liz Lemon (Tina Fey) warns Josh to be careful. Later, thinking Josh is ill, Liz goes to order some soup and on her way, sees Josh. He meets with a producer from The Daily Show, which angers Liz, who decides to help Jack negotiate. When Josh and his agent return to negotiate, believing that an offer from the Daily Show was on the table, Jack promptly reveals that he was able to get the offer from the Daily Show pulled and thus leave Josh with no negotiating power. Jack then offers Josh the same terms as his previous contract but Liz, upset that Josh was not made to suffer for his "betrayal" by speaking with another show, orders Josh to start doing the worm.

Jenna gets into trouble after she is misquoted in Maxim magazine, allegedly saying that she hates the troops. This happened due to Jenna mishearing the interviewer while loud music played during her photoshoot and thinking he meant theatre troupes. The resulting outrage prompts Jack to get her an interview on Hardball with Chris Matthews to clear up the confusion over her comments. During the interview, Jenna confuses Osama bin Laden and then-Senator Barack Obama, who was running for the Democratic Party nomination for president. A further attempt to clear Jenna's name backfires when swastikas are accidentally brandished on the TGS with Tracy Jordan stage.

Tracy allows Kenneth into his entourage, but in the process discovers that Grizz (Grizz Chapman) and Dot Com (Kevin Brown) have been allowing him to win at things such as Halo, Trivial Pursuit and basketball. Tracy "fires" Grizz and Dot Com from the entourage but the union between Tracy and Kenneth does not jell. Grizz and Dot Com come to the rescue after Tracy is surrounded by a mob outside 30 Rockefeller Plaza, which is protesting against the controversy caused by Jenna.

== Production ==
Rachel Dratch, longtime comedy partner and fellow Saturday Night Live alumna of Fey, was originally cast to portray Jenna. Dratch played the role in the show's original pilot, but in August 2006, Jane Krakowski was announced as Dratch's replacement. Executive producer Lorne Michaels announced that while Dratch would not be playing a series regular, she would appear in various episodes in a different role. In this episode, Dratch played Martha Blanch, the activist who is leading the protests, outside of 30 Rockefeller Center, against Jenna.

== Reception ==
In the U.S., the episode remained the lowest-rated episode of the series, in total viewers, until the fifth season. This episode was viewed by 4.6 million viewers and received a rating of 2.4/5 in the key adults 18–49 demographic according to the Nielsen ratings system. The 2.4 refers to 2.4% of all 18- to 49-year-olds, and the 5 refers to 5% of all 18- to 49-year-olds watching television at the time of the broadcast. "Hard Ball" held 86% of 18- to 49-year-old viewers who had viewed the Scrubs episode "My Therapeutic Month" which aired at 9:00PM EST, before "Hard Ball" at 9:30.

Julia Ward of TV Squad exclaimed that the episode's three storylines were "all brilliant". She praised Alec Baldwin, saying that "his negotiation scenes were gold as was his line delivery". She felt that Baldwin's great acting was "not unique to this episode", and was what earned him the Golden Globe. Ward finished her review by saying that it was "satisfying to see a show come together as 30 Rock [had in the] past few weeks - settling into its rhythm [and] finding its feet". Eric Goldman of IGN felt that this episode "did a very skillful job of juggling three different storylines, all of which delivered solid laughs". He thought that the crew of 30 Rock had figured out "better uses for Jenna, and this episode offered some nice moments for her". He also enjoyed Tracy and Kenneth's subplot, saying it "was a decent one".

"Hard Ball" was nominated for a total of three awards, winning one. Jeff Richmond was nominated for a Creative Arts Emmy Award in the category of Outstanding Original Main Title Theme Music for his work on this episode. Matt Hubbard, the writer of this episode, was also nominated for a Writers Guild of America Award in the category of Best Episodic Comedy. The episode was also submitted to voters for the Primetime Emmy Awards category Outstanding Comedy Series, which it won.
