= Up All Night (30 Rock) =

- 30 Rock episode
- Episode no.: Season 1 Episode 13
- Directed by: Michael Engler
- Written by: Tina Fey
- Cinematography by: Vanja Černjul
- Production code: 114
- Original air date: February 8, 2007

Guest appearances
- Joy Behar as herself; Katrina Bowden as Cerie Xerox; Rachel Dratch as Vlem; John Lutz as J.D. Lutz; Maulik Pancholy as Jonathan; Keith Powell as Toofer Spurlock; Lonny Ross as Josh Girard; Isabella Rossellini as Bianca Donaghy; Sherri Shepherd as Angie Jordan; Jason Sudeikis as Floyd DeBarber

Episode chronology
← Previous "Black Tie"	Next → "The C Word"
- 30 Rock season 1

"Up All Night" is the thirteenth episode of NBC's first season of 30 Rock. It was written by the series' creator and executive producer Tina Fey, and was directed by Michael Engler. It first aired on February 8, 2007 in the United States. Guest stars in this episode include Katrina Bowden, Rachel Dratch, Rachel Hamilton, John Lutz, Maulik Pancholy, Keith Powell, Lonny Ross, Isabella Rossellini, Sherri Shepherd, Jason Sudeikis and Mark Zimmerman. Joy Behar appeared as herself in the episode.

This episode focuses on the events of Valentine's Day for the cast and crew of TGS with Tracy Jordan, a fictional sketch comedy series. Liz Lemon (played by Tina Fey) receives a mysterious gift; Frank Rossitano (Judah Friedlander) comments that he hates Jenna Maroney (Jane Krakowski); Pete Hornberger (Scott Adsit) forgets Valentine's Day, which also happens to be his wife, Paula's (Paula Pell) birthday; Jack Donaghy's (Alec Baldwin) divorce from Bianca (Isabella Rossellini) is made official; the writers believe that Cerie Xerox (Katrina Bowden) has romantic feelings for Kenneth Parcell (Jack McBrayer); and Tracy Jordan (Tracy Morgan) tries to spend a night with his wife, Angie Jordan (Sherri Shepherd).

== Plot ==
Jack's wife, Bianca, asks to finalize their divorce, to which Jack agrees, demanding various things in their settlement all to which she agrees to, and the divorce is set for the next day. It is Valentine's Day, although the TGS cast and crew still have to work all night. Frank reveals that he hates Jenna when he always chooses to "kill" Jenna in a game of "Marry, Boff, Kill". Frank believes that Jenna is "phony", and Jenna tries many times to redeem herself with Frank, with reasons such as her participation in Vagina Day: "a charity event founded by a group of celebrities who have, for whatever reason, never been asked to participate in The Vagina Monologues."

Eventually, in her final confrontation with Frank, she farts, but Frank is happy, telling her that that is the first real thing she has done, and the two reconcile. Another game of "Marry, Boff, Kill" leads some of the writers into believing that Cerie (who has been having problems with her fiancé, Aris, as he wants a Greek Orthodox wedding, but she disagrees with the church's position on Cyprus) has feelings for Kenneth when she chooses to "boff" him. The writers send the pair off to get candy for the night. Kenneth and Cerie take a walk around Rockefeller Center, and Cerie reveals that she is not attracted to Kenneth but tells him that he can tell the others that the two made out. However, Kenneth fails to convince the writers that he has done so when he shows them a pair of male underpants, which he claims belong to Cerie.

Jack asks Tracy to have a drink with him to celebrate his impending divorce, but Tracy has to leave early to celebrate Valentine's Day with his wife through "role-play". As Jack gets more and more drunk, he reveals that he still has various fantasies about his wife from grabbing one of her breasts to her getting various terminal diseases with him by her bedside. Eventually, he picks up a prostitute (Rachel Dratch), and the two interrupt Tracy and Angie's Valentine's Day at the Soho Grand Hotel. Angie, upset that their Valentine's Day is ruined, demands that Tracy get rid of Jack and the prostitute, so he calls Liz for help. Liz gets Jack and the drunk prostitute out of the hotel, and Liz tells Jack that his relationship with his wife is sick and presents him with a scenario of "Marry, Boff, Kill", all with his wife, causing Jack to say that he wants to do all of the three but promises Liz that he will get over his wife, and the two leave the prostitute in the street. The next day, Jack and Bianca sign the divorce papers, and Bianca begs Jack not to sell the Arby's that he had gotten in their settlement. He promises not to do so, but will let the place shut down and become desolate. The two argue, and the sexual tension between the two escalate, until Bianca tears herself away from Jack and leaves.

Pete has forgotten that it is Valentine's Day, which also happens to be his wife's birthday. He spends the night running around the city to try to find Valentine's Day and birthday presents for his wife, only to lose the balloons that he had bought for his wife. Liz has received a gift of chocolate-covered cherries and flowers from a supposed secret admirer. The "admirer" turns out to be "a law stylist", (Jason Sudeikis) and the gifts turn out to be for his girlfriend, Liz Lemler, who works in the accounting department at TGS. However, he tells Liz to keep the flowers but asks for a picture of her with the flowers and her ID to prove to his girlfriend that he did indeed get her something for Valentine's Day.

== Reception ==
"Up All Night" brought in an average of 5.2 million viewers. The episode also achieved a 2.5/6 in the key 18- to 49-year-old demographic. The 2.5 refers to 2.5% of all 18- to 49-year-olds in the U.S., and the 6 refers to 6% of all 18- to 49-year-olds watching television at the time of the broadcast in the U.S..

Matt Webb Mitovich of TV Guide wrote that "it would be nearly impossible to measure up to last week's utterly manic introduction of Prince Gerhardt [Paul Reubens], so forgive 30 Rock if this week's outing was 'merely' very amusing at times." He added that compared to Jack's storyline, he "actually wore more grins watching the microscopic B-story with the writers, playing Marry, Boff, Kill." Robert Canning of IGN thought that "the Valentine's Day episode of 30 Rock gave us a big surprise: a low-key half hour from a show known for being over the top," adding that this was "a pleasant surprise". He said that this episode "proved that [30 Rock] could make with the funny no matter what the tone". Canning rated this episode 8.5 out of 10.
