= Blind Date (30 Rock) =

- 30 Rock episode
- Episode no.: Season 1 Episode 3
- Directed by: Adam Bernstein
- Written by: John Riggi
- Production code: 103
- Original air date: October 25, 2006

Guest appearances
- Brett Baer as Guy At Bar; Katrina Bowden as Cerie Xerox; Kevin Brown as Dot Com; Grizz Chapman as Grizz Griswold; John Lutz as J.D. Lutz; Stephanie March as Gretchen Thomas; Maulik Pancholy as Jonathan; Keith Powell as Toofer Spurlock; Lonny Ross as Josh Girard; Teddy Coluca as Stage Manager; Rich Brevard as Big Rich; David Rankin as Young Dave

Episode chronology
← Previous "The Aftermath"	Next → "Jack the Writer"
- 30 Rock season 1

"Blind Date" is the third episode of the first season of the American television comedy series 30 Rock. It was written by co-executive producer John Riggi and directed by Adam Bernstein. The episode originally aired on NBC in the United States on October 25, 2006. Guest stars in this episode include Brett Baer, Katrina Bowden, Kevin Brown, Grizz Chapman, John Lutz, Stephanie March, Maulik Pancholy, Keith Powell, and Lonny Ross.

The episode focuses on Jack Donaghy (Alec Baldwin) setting up Liz Lemon (Tina Fey) on a blind date with a friend of his (March). At the same time, Jack infiltrates the TGS with Tracy Jordan writers'—Pete Hornberger (Scott Adsit), Josh Girard (Ross), Frank Rossitano (Judah Friedlander), James "Toofer" Spurlock (Powell), and J. D. Lutz (Lutz)—weekly poker game and starts winning hands until NBC page Kenneth Parcell (Jack McBrayer) joins in and proves to be a surprisingly adept player.

"Blind Date" has received generally positive reviews from television critics. According to the Nielsen ratings system, the episode was watched by 6.01 million viewers during its original broadcast, and received a 2.2 rating/6 share among viewers in the 18–49 demographic. "Blind Date" was nominated for Outstanding Individual Episode (in a series without a regular gay character) at the 18th GLAAD Media Awards.

== Plot ==
Jack Donaghy (Alec Baldwin) is concerned that Liz Lemon (Tina Fey) is stressed and underperforming as the head writer of TGS with Tracy Jordan because of a lack of human contact. He suggests that she go on a date with his friend "Thomas", which she initially refuses. When she almost chokes to death alone in her apartment that night, an action that Jack had foreshadowed as "a single woman's biggest worry," she changes her mind. She meets her date in a restaurant and finds that Jack has set her up with Gretchen Thomas (Stephanie March), a lesbian. Although Liz and Gretchen have great chemistry, Gretchen is not interested in chasing after a "straight girl". The next day, Liz chastises Jack for thinking she was a lesbian. At night, Liz gets lonely and calls Gretchen. After sharing their fears as single women, they go to dinner. There, Gretchen expresses that she feels she is starting to chase the "straight girl" and says they should stop seeing each other. Liz attempts to make a pact that they get back together after 25 years and start a relationship then if they are both still single, but Gretchen walks away.

At the same time, poker night is a Thursday night tradition among Pete Hornberger (Scott Adsit), Josh Girard (Lonny Ross), Frank Rossitano (Judah Friedlander), James "Toofer" Spurlock (Keith Powell), and J. D. Lutz (John Lutz), the TGS staff. Jack and Tracy Jordan (Tracy Morgan) join them for the first time. Jack is able to read and defeat all of the other players, except for NBC page Kenneth Parcell (Jack McBrayer), who wins the final hand. The next day, Jack sets up another poker night. Eventually, Jack and Kenneth come down to the final hand. Jack has more chips and goes all-in. He offers to make the hand winner-take-all if Kenneth bets his page jacket. Kenneth agrees, and Jack's pair of twos beats Kenneth's king high. Liz asks why Kenneth would bet on a hand like that, and he responds that he enjoys living on the edge and was also confused about the rules. Jack stops Kenneth from leaving, explains that he only made Kenneth bet his job to prove his power over him, and returns the jacket to Kenneth with the expectation that he come in early on Monday.

== Production ==
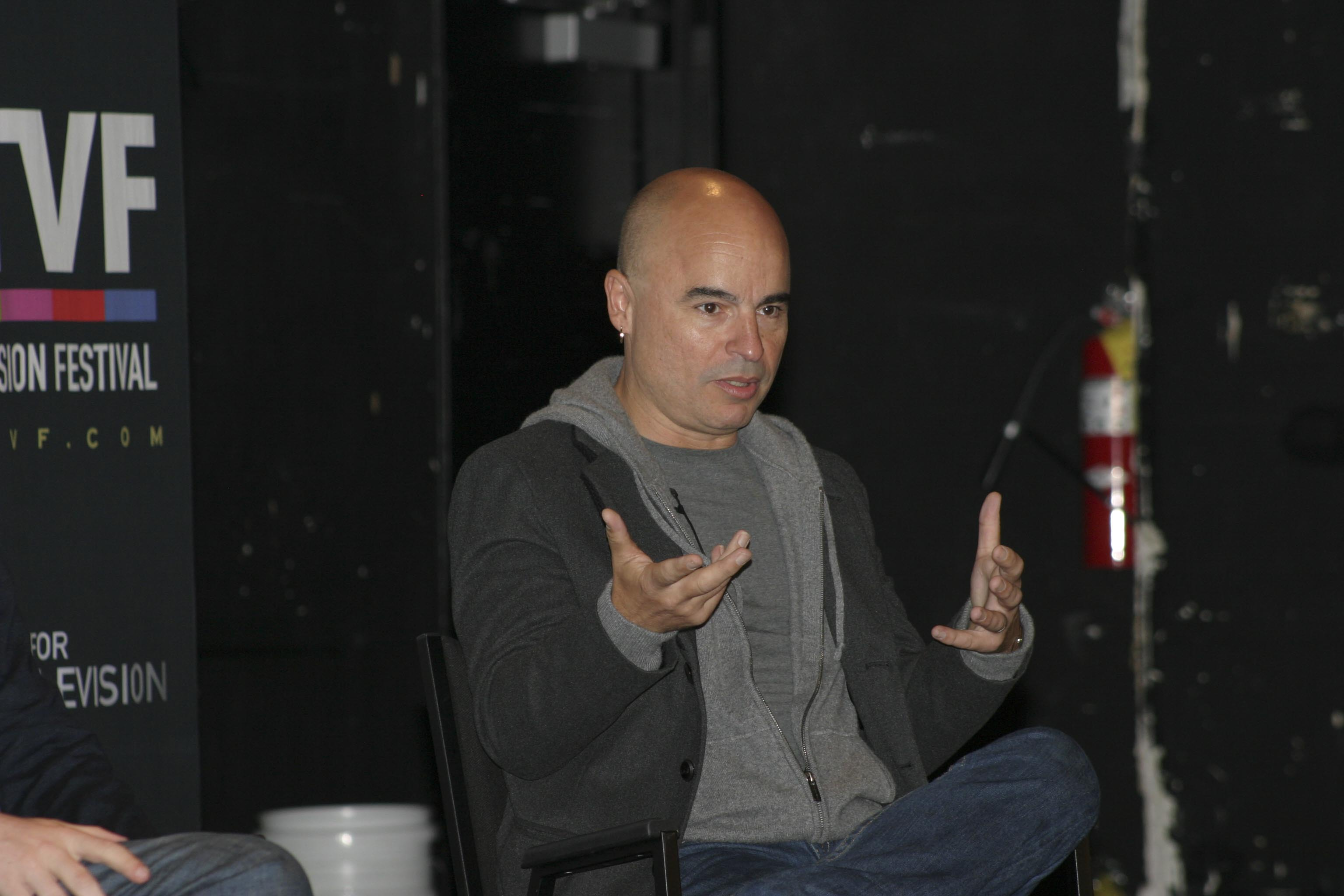
"Blind Date" was written by co-executive producer John Riggi (pictured).

"Blind Date" was written by co-executive producer John Riggi and was directed by supervising producer Adam Bernstein. This episode originally aired on October 25, 2006, on NBC as the third episode of the show's first season. This episode featured a guest appearance from actress Stephanie March, who played Gretchen Thomas. That season's co-executive producer Brett Baer had a brief appearance in "Blind Date" as a man who hits on Liz after Gretchen leaves.

One filmed scene from "Blind Date" was cut out from the airing. Instead, the scene was featured on 30 Rock's season 1 DVD as part of the deleted scenes in the Bonus feature. In the scene, Pete comes to Liz's office and tells her about how Jack set-up the TGS stage in which they can play poker. Liz asks him if it would be all right if she brings Gretchen to the poker game.

Towards the end of the episode Jack declares about Kenneth; "in five years we'll all either be working for him, or dead by his hand". This inadvertently foreshadows the events of Season 7 when Jack personally chooses Kenneth to be his replacement as the head of NBC.

== Reception ==
According to the Nielsen ratings system, "Blind Date" was viewed by 6.01 million viewers upon its original broadcast in the United States. It earned a 2.2 rating/6 share in the 18–49 demographic. This means that it was seen by 2.2 percent of all 18- to 49-year-olds, and 6 percent of all 18- to 49-year-olds watching television at the time of the broadcast. This was an increase from the previous episode, "The Aftermath", as it was watched by 5.7 million American viewers. This episode was the 72nd most watched episode of the week. "Blind Date" was nominated at the 18th GLAAD Media Awards for Outstanding Individual Episode (in a series without a regular gay character), but lost to the Grey's Anatomy episode "Where the Boys Are".

Since airing, the episode has received generally positive reviews. It is often considered to be a turning point in the series, where the show found its footing and could start living up its potential. Robert Canning of IGN praised the episode for "playing to its strengths", and focusing on the series' "most fully realized characters", Liz and Jack. He pointed out that Tracy had "leveled off significantly from his constant high", making him "funnier in the process". Canning also enjoyed Kenneth's increased screen time and the lack of the Jenna Maroney character, played by Jane Krakowski. A television reviewer for the Chicago Tribune noted that the scenes between Jack and Liz are always "a treat" and enjoyed the scene in this episode in which Liz chastises Jack for thinking she was a lesbian. The reviewer also added that Judah Friedlander, Keith Powell, and Scott Adsit, who play Frank, Toofer, and Pete, respectively, "haven't been given enough to do", and hoped that the show would produce funny moments from the writers' room. Sarah Warn of AfterEllen.com felt that for a single-episode lesbian sitcom character, Gretchen was "one of the best we've seen". Warn also enjoyed the episode itself, calling it "one of the funniest sitcom episodes I've seen so far this season". Kevin D. Thompson of The Palm Beach Post noted that "Blind Date" was one of the "show's funniest episodes". A reviewer from the Richmond Times-Dispatch also praised the episode, citing that it was "one of the show's best."
