= Trivection oven =

General Electric convection microwave

Trivection oven is the brand name of a convection microwave created by General Electric, which combines radiant heat, convection, and microwaves for customized cooking. According to GE, it cooks food five times faster than a traditional oven. Alton Brown, host of Good Eats, was involved in developing the oven.

== In popular culture ==
The product was featured in the pilot of the American situation comedy 30 Rock, in which the character Jack Donaghy describes the product, claiming to have invented it himself and pegging it as his "greatest triumph" after years and years of market research.

== See also ==
- Advantium
- Speed oven
