= The Rural Juror =

- 30 Rock episode
- Episode no.: Season 1 Episode 10
- Directed by: Beth McCarthy
- Written by: Matt Hubbard
- Production code: 111
- Original air date: January 11, 2007

Episode chronology
← Previous "The Baby Show"	Next → "The Head and the Hair"
- 30 Rock season 1

"The Rural Juror" is the tenth episode of the first season of 30 Rock. It was written by Matt Hubbard and was directed by Beth McCarthy. The episode first aired on January 11, 2007, on the NBC network in the United States. Guest stars in the episode include Lonny Ross, Keith Powell, Maulik Pancholy, Kevin Brown, Grizz Chapman, Chris Parnell, Rachel Dratch, Whoopi Goldberg, Charlie Grandy, Bob Wiltfong, and Matt Oberg.

The episode focuses on the release of Jenna Maroney's (Jane Krakowski) long-anticipated indie film, The Rural Juror, the tongue-twisting title of which Liz Lemon (Tina Fey) and the writers of TGS with Tracy Jordan cannot understand. Meanwhile, Tracy Jordan (Tracy Morgan), desperate for some financial help, heeds Jack Donaghy's (Alec Baldwin) advice and creates his own celebrity product to endorse.

== Plot ==
Jenna anticipates the opening of her new film, The Rural Juror. The film, based on a "Kevin Grisham novel" (John Grisham's brother), revolves around a Southern–born lawyer named Constance Justice. Jenna wants Liz to give her an honest opinion of the film, as she is nervous about how it will be received by the public. Liz sees the film in private, and her reaction is very negative, but she hesitates to tell Jenna the truth. When Jenna finds out that Liz hated the film, the two start fighting and accusing each other of not being truthful. Meanwhile, ignoring Liz's warnings, Josh Girard (Lonny Ross) manages to break into Liz's office to steal the film, which he watches with the rest of the TGS with Tracy Jordan writing staff. Much to Liz's shock, the staff say they liked the film. As the argument between Liz and Jenna escalates, Jack intervenes and persuades them to work things out. Liz admits that she was jealous of Jenna's success and Jenna remembers that the diet pills she was taking would lead to mood swings, and they forgive one another.

Jack is on the phone with Maureen Dowd when Tracy shows up to ask him for $100,000 (it was $60,000, but he forgot to account for one of his houses). Jack tells him that this is impossible but says that he has a better idea: use his celebrity image to endorse a product to generate the money. After Tracy agrees, he comes up with "The Tracy Jordan Meat Machine". Armed with an "endorsement" from Dr. Spaceman (Chris Parnell) and hook-ups from Jack, the product is finally ready for sale. Soon after, a series of product defects prompts Tracy to tell Jack that he no longer wishes to endorse the product. Jack finds a way to make it work: by rebranding it as a Whoopi Goldberg-endorsed product targeted for Ukraine.

== Production ==
"The Rural Juror" was filmed in early November 2006. Regarding the episode's title, Tina Fey explained that "it came out of a discussion in the writers' room" when she asked, "you know what two words I cannot pronounce properly?" After a few abortive efforts by Fey's co-writers, who also made "rural juror" sound akin to "ruhhr-juhhrr," everyone was so pleased that they "wanted to hurry up and get it on the air before someone else did." Jenna's film, The Rural Juror, was first mentioned three episodes earlier, in "Tracy Does Conan", and referenced several times later. A running joke throughout the series was the difficulty in pronouncing the film's title, so that everyone thought it was called something different. Throughout the episode, the film was called "Roar Her, Gem Her" by Liz; and also "Oral Germ Whore" and "Roaring Junior" by Pete. This episode also features the first mention of Mitch Lemon (Andy Richter), Liz's brother. Mitch has a form of amnesia, named Trauma Induced Niveaphasia, due to a skiing accident in December 1985.

== Reception ==
According to the Nielsen ratings system, "The Rural Juror" was viewed by an average of 6.10 million American viewers. The episode achieved a rating of 2.9 in the key adults 18–49 demographic, which refers to 2.9% of all 18- to 49-year-olds in the U.S. The episode was ranked sixty-third in Nielsen's prime-time television rankings for the week. Upon its original broadcast in the United Kingdom, this episode was viewed by 200,000 viewers, which was 2% of the viewing audience at the time of the broadcast.

Robert Canning of IGN said the episode "was a well-crafted half-hour with a solid main storyline". He said that the episode took 30 Rock in the "right direction" with a good story structure and a "successful effort at developing its characters". Canning rated the episode 8 out of 10. Julia Ward of AOL's TV Squad started her review by saying if Alec Baldwin did not win the Golden Globe for his performance, she would have no choice but to resign from her post at the Hollywood Foreign Press Association, which he did at the 64th Golden Globe Awards for Best Performance by an Actor in a Television Series - Comedy or Musical. She enjoyed Tina Fey's performance and liked Tracy's meat machine endorsement, Liz's "singles yoga" and "scalp pain" Google searches and Dr. Leo Spaceman's "reds, yellows, purples". She criticized several guest appearances, saying Goldberg's guest appearance was "underwhelming," and felt that Jane Krakowski was still "an odd fit for the show". Matt Webb Mitovich of TV Guide also gave a positive review, saying the episode "moved so dang fast and was so crackling" that it was very entertaining.

=== Character development ===
Several critics praised this episode for its character development, something that they said was missing in the previous episodes. Robert Canning of IGN said that although there was still plenty of room for growth, the episode gave a better understanding of Liz and Jenna's friendship. He felt that prior to the episode, nothing was known about Liz and Jenna's longtime friendship, and that there was no depth to it. Canning said that Liz's admission of being somewhat jealous of Jenna's success was a much needed storyline for the show, and one that gave the audience something deeper to latch onto. However, Canning pointed out that small hints of what their friendship was like in the past were played for laughs as opposed to establishing any sort of history. Canning found that their verbal sparring really "solidified their bond", and that by the end of the episode the audience had seen their "human side" and the "characters had become people".

Matt Webb Mitovich of TV Guide said that he was finally starting to understand Jenna, and how she fits into the show. He said that even though she was supposed to come off as flighty and disillusioned at times, he realized that in reality she was not completely so. He also noted the development in Liz and Jenna's friendship, learning that they go "way back" as friends and as a comedy team. Julia Ward of AOL's TV Squad disagreed, however. She felt that the show had too many storylines and that this episode made it seem as if the show was about the relationship between Liz and Jenna, rather than the storylines introduced in the pilot. She said that having several ongoing storylines is possible, but the show needs some kind of center.
