= Christmas Special (30 Rock) =

- 30 Rock episode
- Episode no.: Season 3 Episode 6
- Directed by: Don Scardino
- Written by: Kay Cannon; Tina Fey
- Production code: 306
- Original air date: December 11, 2008

Guest appearance
- Elaine Stritch as Colleen

Episode chronology
← Previous "Reunion"	Next → "Señor Macho Solo"

"Christmas Special" is the sixth episode of the third season of the American television comedy series 30 Rock. It was written by executive story editor Kay Cannon, and series' creator, executive producer and lead actress Tina Fey. The director of this episode was series producer Don Scardino. The episode originally aired on December 11, 2008 on NBC.

In the episode, Liz Lemon (Tina Fey) decides to help a charity for underprivileged children after her parents ditch their holiday plans. Jack Donaghy's (Alec Baldwin) mother, Colleen (Elaine Stritch), stops Jack from going on a Christmas vacation so he ends up taking his frustration out on the TGS staff. The TGS crew have to ditch their own plans for a holiday-themed episode of the show.

"Christmas Special" received mixed reviews from television critics. According to the Nielsen ratings system, it was watched by 8.9 million households during its original broadcast, becoming the series' highest-rated episode. For her performance in this episode, Elaine Stritch received a Primetime Emmy Award nomination in the category for Outstanding Guest Actress in a Comedy Series.

== Plot ==
Liz announces to the staff of The Girlie Show with Tracy Jordan (TGS) that she is participating in a charity which provides gifts to underprivileged children who write letters to Santa. She buys far more than what is requested in the letter, wanting to see the children's happiness. When Liz delivers the presents to the apartment in the letter, however, the door is answered by two adults who take the gifts, and she believes she has been tricked. Receiving no help from the US Postal Service, who run the charity, she attempts to have it shut down. This upsets Kenneth who refuses to believe anyone would scam a Christmas charity. She takes Kenneth back to the apartment to prove she was right, but two children answer the door and Liz accidentally reveals to them that Santa Claus is not real.

Meanwhile, Jack accidentally backs into his mother, Colleen Donaghy (Elaine Stritch), with his car in Florida. Bedridden, she decides to stay with Jack, and her presence greatly annoys him. Jack reveals to Liz that after he hit his mother he waited eight minutes before calling 9-1-1, and is worried she will find out. Jack tries to stay away from his mother by having the cast and crew of TGS produce a last-minute Christmas special. However, Colleen discovers the secret, and confronts him with it. Jack responds by expressing his anger with her for her behavior at Christmas while he was a child. Ultimately, after talking with Liz, Jack realizes that Colleen was actually a caring mother, and reconciles with her.

== Production ==
"Christmas Special" was written by executive story editor Kay Cannon, and series creator, executive producer and lead actress Tina Fey. This episode was directed by series producer Don Scardino. This was Cannon and Fey's third script collaboration, having co-written the episodes "Black Tie" and "Somebody to Love". "Christmas Special" originally aired on NBC in the United States on December 11, 2008.

The story with the Jack Donaghy character accidentally hitting his mother with his car was based on an experience by one of the 30 Rock writers. According to executive producer Robert Carlock: "This actually happened. The niece of one of our writers hit her grandmother—the writer's mother—with her car. We kind of spent a day saying, 'Can we do this? Is everything going to be okay?' And she was fine, so we figured that would be a fun, fraught thing to happen between Jack and his mom, especially right before Christmas."

This was Elaine Stritch's third appearance as Collen Donaghy, Jack's mother, on 30 Rock. She guest starred in the episodes "Hiatus" and "Ludachristmas". At the end of "Christmas Special", Jack and Colleen sing a duet of "The Christmas Song". In regards to the duet, Stritch told TV Guide: "It's [Jack's] fantasy. It was an interesting acting challenge. I didn't sing it like I sing it; I sang it like I imagined Colleen Donaghy would try to sing it."

== Reception ==
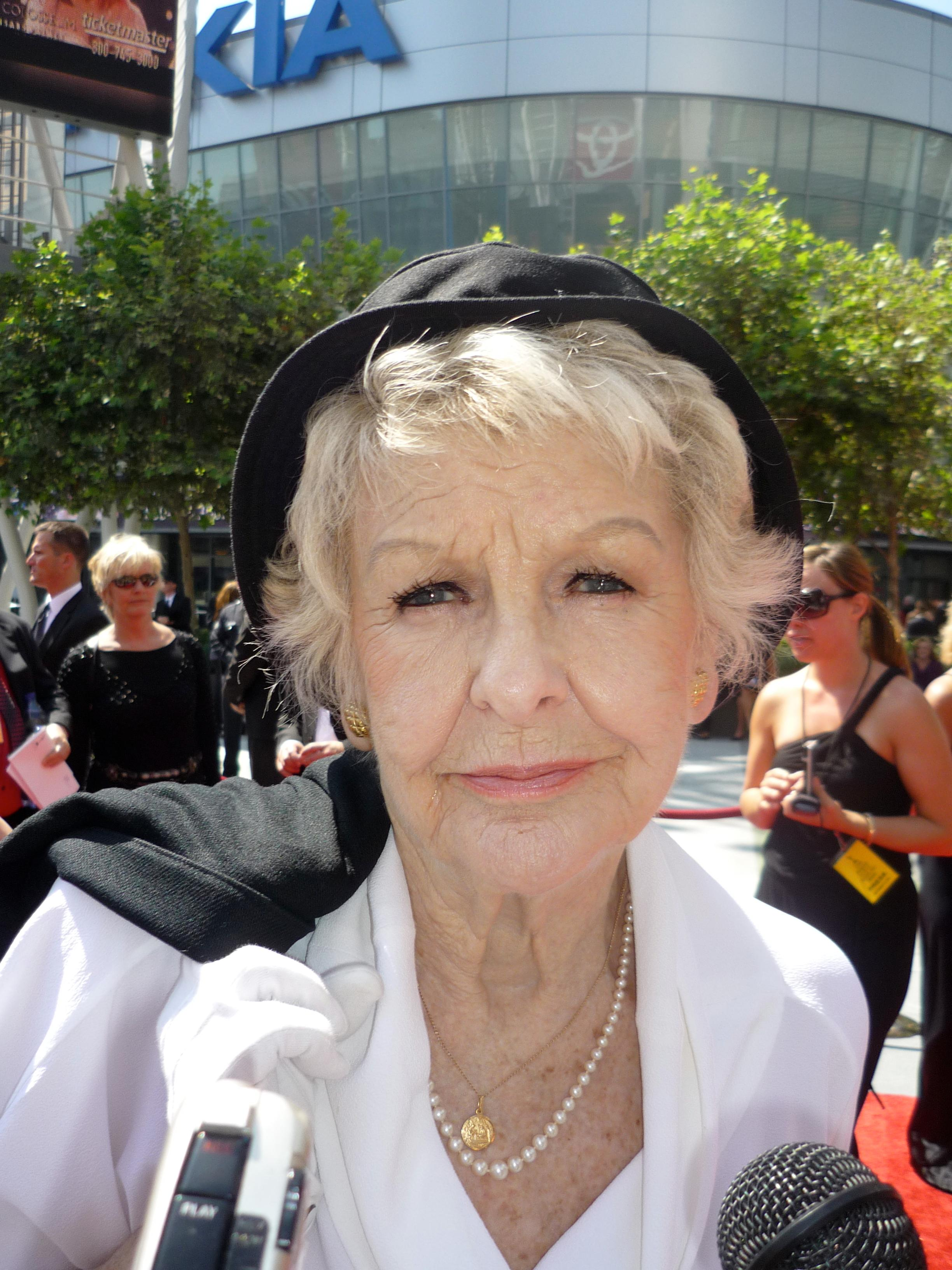
Elaine Stritch received an Emmy nomination for Outstanding Guest Actress in a Comedy Series for her performance in this episode.

In its original American broadcast, "Christmas Special" was watched by 8.9 million households, according to the Nielsen ratings system, and became the show's highest-rated episode so far. It received a 3.8 rating/9 share among viewers in the 18–49 demographic, meaning that 3.8% of all people in that group, and 9% of all people from that group watching television at the time, watched the episode. The season premiere episode, "Do-Over", was up until that point the highest-rated episode of the show, with 8.7 million viewers. Elaine Stritch received a Primetime Emmy Award nomination for Outstanding Guest Actress in a Comedy Series at the 61st Primetime Emmy Awards for her work in this episode, but lost it to Tina Fey for her satirical portrayal of Sarah Palin on Saturday Night Live.

Critical reception of the episode was not entirely favorable. Television columnist Alan Sepinwall for The Star-Ledger commented that he had not really liked any of Elaine Stritch's appearances as Jack's mother on the series, writing that "Jack's fear and loathing of his mother just feels claustrophobic and uncomfortable instead of funny, and I'm as eager to see the end of her visits as [Jack] usually is." Sepinwall said that "very little" of "Christmas Special" worked. "I want to be in the holiday spirit, but this is two Christmas duds in a row from 30 Rock, and we can't even blame the looming writers strike this time around." IGN contributor Robert Canning believed the show could have delivered a Christmas episode, but noted that their attempt at it "was a little less than satisfying. The ideas were there, but the rhythm of the episode was off." Nonetheless, Canning said the episode was not terrible. He enjoyed all the plots except for Liz's, writing that it did not quite fit, and that "the overall result of Liz's plot just wasn't all that funny." In conclusion, Canning gave the episode a 7.8 out of 10 rating. Jeremy Medina for Paste found that there was nothing "special" about this episode. In his opinion, Liz should be featured in "new and exciting plot line[s]" rather than helping Jack endure his troubles with his mother.

Not all reviews were negative; Bob Sassone of AOL's TV Squad wrote: "I'm a sucker for Christmas episodes." He was complimentary towards Stritch's role as Jack's mother, citing that she has been "demanding and a little difficult, but she also makes you really feel for her."
