= Black Tie (30 Rock) =

- 30 Rock episode
- Episode no.: Season 1 Episode 12
- Directed by: Don Scardino
- Written by: Kay Cannon; Tina Fey
- Production code: 113
- Original air date: February 1, 2007

Episode chronology
| ← Previous "The Head and the Hair" | Next → "Up All Night" |
- 30 Rock season 1

"Black Tie" is the twelfth episode of the first season of the American television comedy series 30 Rock. It was directed by Don Scardino, and written by Kay Cannon and series creator Tina Fey. The episode originally aired on NBC in the United States on February 1, 2007. Guest stars in this episode include Kevin Brown, Grizz Chapman, Will Forte, April Lee Hernández, Paul Reubens, and Isabella Rossellini.

In the episode, Liz Lemon (Tina Fey) attends a prince's (Reubens) birthday party with her boss Jack Donaghy (Alec Baldwin) and meets Jack's ex-wife (Rossellini). At the same time, Tracy Jordan (Tracy Morgan) tries to convince Pete Hornberger (Scott Adsit) to cheat on his wife at a wild party while NBC page Kenneth Parcell (Jack McBrayer) encourages him not to.

== Plot ==
Liz is invited by Jack to accompany him to a birthday party for his friend, Prince Gerhardt Habsburg (Loosely based on the Habsburg monarch Carlos II), which she accepts. Liz fears the invitation is a date, but Jack denies this when asked. Later, Liz runs into her friend Jenna Maroney (Jane Krakowski) at the party. While the two talk, Prince Gerhardt (Paul Reubens) makes his entrance, introduced as His Royal Highness the Duke of Thuringia, the Earl of the Duchy of Westphalia, Prince Gerhardt Messerschmitt Rammstein von Hoppe. He is disfigured and often ill due to "centuries of inbreeding." Meanwhile, Jack is shocked to see his ex-wife Bianca (Isabella Rossellini) enter the room. When she comes over to say hello, Jack introduces Liz as his live-in girlfriend. She likes Liz and tells Jack not to let her get away.

At the same time, Prince Gerhardt spots Jenna and sends his messenger, Tomas (Will Forte), over to invite her to dine with him. Eager to become a modern-day Grace Kelly, she talks herself into doing it, despite his problems. Later, Bianca tells Liz that she dislikes the idea that Liz can make Jack truly happy. Liz tells Jack that Bianca is still not over him and to prove it, she goes to her and tells her the two are engaged. At hearing this, Bianca reacts violently and attacks Liz (slapping her, strangling her, ripping her hair extensions out, pulling down her dress, and threatening to cut her with a broken wine bottle). Later, Prince Gerhardt decides he can now die happy, after he and Jenna discussed their relationship, and drinks some champagne, which kills him because he was born with the inability to digest grapes and anything made from grapes. As a result, the party comes to a conclusion. Jack walks Liz up to her apartment. Before he leaves, he leans in to take off the necklace he lent her, which she mistakes for an attempted kiss. Jack acts semi-repulsed by the idea, and tells Liz to give it up.

Finally, at the 30 Rock studios, after overhearing Pete impersonating Elmo from Sesame Street while Pete was encouraging his son to do better with his potty training, Tracy compares Pete's relationship with his wife to that of Samson and Delilah. While working late at night in his office, Tracy enters with Grizz (Grizz Chapman) and Dot Com (Kevin Brown) and a couple of other people, which turns into a party. Pete is still working, while Tracy's entourage enjoy themselves. Tracy encourages Pete to loosen up, and asks one of the women, Vicki (April Lee Hernández), to look after him. Pete finally loosens up and begins to give in to Vicki's temptations, but Kenneth sets him straight, telling him to recall the day that he got married.

== Production ==
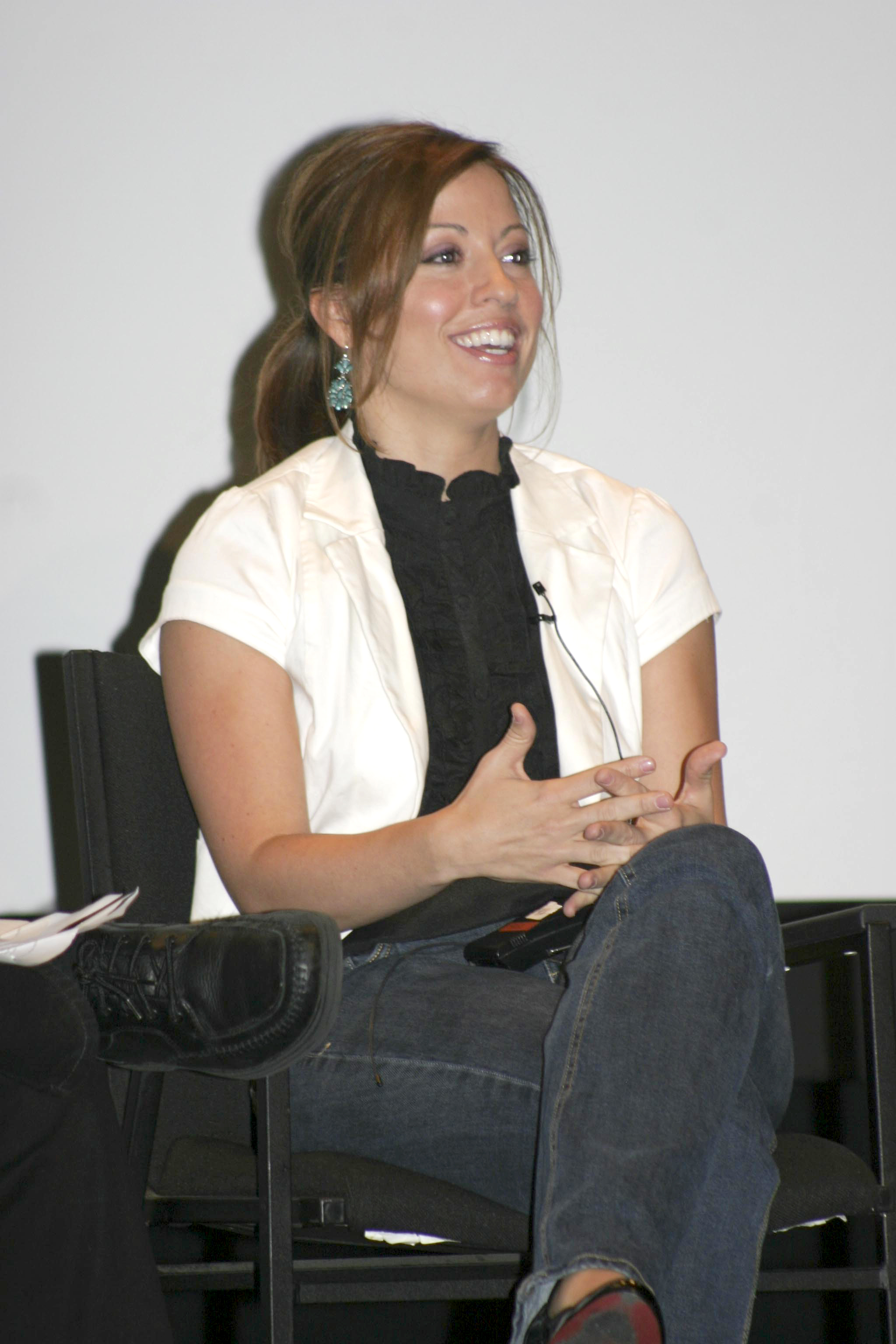
Kay Cannon (pictured) wrote "Black Tie" along with co-writer Tina Fey.

"Black Tie" was directed by Don Scardino, and written by Kay Cannon and series creator Tina Fey. This was Cannon and Fey's first script collaboration, later co-writing the episodes "Somebody to Love", "Christmas Special", and "Lee Marvin vs. Derek Jeter", for season two, season three, and season four, respectively. "Black Tie" originally aired on NBC in the United States on February 1, 2007, as the twelfth episode of the show's first season and overall of the series.

This episode featured guest appearances by actors Paul Reubens and Isabella Rossellini. Fey wrote the role of Prince Gerhardt Hapsburg specifically for Reubens, and he did not have to audition. Fey, in regard to Reubens, said: "We were thrilled beyond belief to get him to do [the role]." Kevin Lasit, the show's prop master, built Gerhardt's wheelchair and puppet legs. Fey said that Lasit "really outdid himself", and noted that Reubens was kneeling in the wheelchair in the seat built over the top of him. In addition, Reubens wore prosthetic teeth and a wig to accommodate his character's look. According to Fey, in the DVD commentary for this episode, the show shot an alternate ending—at Reubens's request—in which Gerhardt does not die, "but ultimately it felt better stakes for the story if he'd die", in which Will Forte's character says, "The Habsburg line has ended. You can pick up your gift bags at the coat check." In "Black Tie", Rosellini played Bianca, the ex-wife of Alec Baldwin's character, Jack Donaghy. Rosellini would make a second appearance in the February 8, 2007, episode "Up All Night". Comedian actor Will Forte, who played Tomas, the messenger of Prince Gerhardt, has appeared in the main cast of Saturday Night Live (SNL), a weekly sketch comedy series which airs on NBC in the United States. Fey was the head writer on SNL from 1999 until 2006. Forte would later return to 30 Rock as Paul, a love interest of Jenna Maroney's.

In the beginning of the episode, Liz and Josh Girard (Lonny Ross) are exchanging Yo Mamma Jokes. According to Fey, Liz's joke, "What's the difference between your mama and a washing machine? When I drop a load in the washing machine, it doesn't follow me around for a week", was "pretty dirty", and was surprised that the show was able to get away with the joke. It has since been censored in syndication.

== Reception ==
"'Black Tie' was a great example of what makes 30 Rock so darn enjoyable. It combined completely absurd, off-the-wall nonsense with real and believable human stories and had you constantly laughing as a result. Add to that two hilarious guest appearances and you're left with yet another fantastic episode".

— Robert Canning,
IGN

According to the Nielsen ratings system, "Black Tie" was watched by 5.7 million households in its original American broadcast. It earned a 2.9 rating/7 share in the 18–49 demographic, meaning that 2.9 percent of all people in that group, and 7 percent of all people from that group watching television at the time, watched the episode. This was an increase from the previous episode, "The Head and the Hair", which was watched by 5.0 million American viewers. Since airing, the episode has received generally positive reviews from television critics.

IGN contributor Robert Canning called it a "fantastic episode" and rated it 8 out of 10. He enjoyed all the subplots, and the performances by Paul Reubens and Isabella Rossellini. Julia Ward of AOL's TV Squad wrote that Reubens and Rossellini were "pretty inspired choices", and said that "Tracy as the devil, Kenneth as the angel" gag—in which Tracy was encouraging Pete to cheat on his wife while Kenneth told him not to—was also "inspired". TV Guide's Matt Mitovich was favorable to the guest appearances of Reubens, Rossellini, and Will Forte, but said that Reubens's role "served up a memorable majesty on a very strong, very laugh-out-loud funny installment" of this episode. Mitovich was impressed with how "Black Tie" handled Liz's "date" with Jack, citing that lesser shows would have "gone there" in the final scene, "and really jacked up the 'tension' between its two leads, but Tina Fey and her crack writing staff didn't. They kept it 99.44 percent light, meaning we now won't ... be wondering, 'What if...?'" in regard to the episode itself, Mitovich said it was an "awesome episode, an immeasurably enjoyable, laugh-inducing series." Seattle Post-Intelligencer contributor Melanie McFarland said that Reubens was "perfectly cast as such a freak", though in regard to Rossellini's appearance "[s]he glides in playing the class act we're used to, but when Rossellini dissolves into a shocking mess, she yields one of the series' most absurd scenes yet." It was rated the 28th greatest TV episode of all time on TV Guide's list.
