= Pilot (30 Rock) =

- 30 Rock episode
- Episode no.: Season 1 Episode 1
- Directed by: Adam Bernstein
- Written by: Tina Fey
- Cinematography by: Tom Houghton; Mike Trim
- Production code: 101
- Original air date: October 11, 2006

Guest appearances
- Rachel Dratch as Greta Johansen; Keith Powell as Toofer; Lonny Ross as Josh Girard; Maulik Pancholy as Jonathan; Katrina Bowden as Cerie; Tom Broecker as Lee; Teddy Coluca as Stage Manager; Kevin Brown as Dot Com; Grizz Chapman as Grizz; John Lutz as J.D. Lutz

Episode chronology
← Previous —	Next → "The Aftermath"
- 30 Rock season 1

The pilot episode of the American television sitcom 30 Rock premiered on October 10, 2006, on the CTV Television Network in Canada, and October 11, 2006, on NBC in the United States. The episode was directed by Adam Bernstein and written by Tina Fey, the series' creator, executive producer, and lead actress.

In 2002, Tina Fey, then head writer of Saturday Night Live (SNL), pitched the idea for a series about a cable news network to NBC, which rejected it. Two years later, Fey approached NBC with a similar idea: a behind-the-scenes look at The Girlie Show, a television show similar to SNL. NBC approved the series in May 2006 and production began shortly after. The episode was generally well-received and it finished third in its timeslot among all viewers and among adults aged 18 to 49. Critics praised the performances of Jack McBrayer and Jane Krakowski, who played Kenneth Parcell and Jenna Maroney, respectively.

Several characters are introduced in the pilot: Liz Lemon (Tina Fey), the head writer of a sketch comedy series called The Girlie Show; Jack Donaghy (Alec Baldwin), the network executive; Kenneth Parcell (Jack McBrayer), the NBC page; and the writing staff and cast of Lemon's show. This episode focuses on Jack's attempt to convince Liz to hire film star Tracy Jordan (Tracy Morgan) as part of the cast of The Girlie Show and the crew's reactions to Tracy's addition.

== Plot ==
Liz Lemon (Tina Fey), the head writer of the television series The Girlie Show, attempts to buy a hot dog before work. After a fellow commuter tries to jump the queue, Liz buys $150 worth of hot dogs and distributes them to random passersby and colleagues. When she arrives at work, she is embarrassed when she is forced by Kenneth (Jack McBrayer), the naïve NBC page who conducts tours around 30 Rock, to introduce herself to a group of The Girlie Show fans.

Liz and her producer Pete Hornberger (Scott Adsit) meet with The Girlie Show's new network executive Jack Donaghy (Alec Baldwin). Jack tells Liz and Pete that he has been sent to 30 Rock to retool The Girlie Show. After he inadvertently insults her, Liz takes an initial dislike to Jack. Jack asks Liz to hire Tracy Jordan (Tracy Morgan), star of the film Honky Grandma Be Trippin', as part of the cast – in order to bring male viewers between 18-49 to the show. Liz is skeptical, as Tracy has a history of problematic behavior. In comparison to Liz, Jenna Maroney (Jane Krakowski), the narcissistic star of The Girlie Show, takes to Jack upon their first meeting. She begins to worry when she hears that Tracy may become the new star of the show.

Against her own judgment, Liz meets Tracy at a restaurant, but when Tracy discovers that he does not like the food, they go to another restaurant. While Liz tries to convince Tracy not to join The Girlie Show, he discusses conspiracy theories. After the meeting, Tracy offers to take Liz back to the studio, but he makes a detour to a strip club in the Bronx. While trying to get home, Liz learns that Jack fired Pete earlier that day. Tracy and Liz arrive at the studio halfway through the live broadcast of the show. Liz sends Tracy out on stage to talk off the last bit of the show, much to The Girlie Show studio audience's delight and Jenna's shock. Backstage, Liz forces Jack to rehire Pete and to promise to guarantee Jenna's job security.

== Production ==
=== Conception ===
Tina Fey, the head writer and a performer on NBC's Saturday Night Live, pitched a pilot episode for a situation comedy about a cable news network to NBC in 2002. NBC Entertainment president, Kevin Reilly, felt, "Fey was using the news setting as a fig leaf for her own experience and [he] encouraged her to write what she knew." The pilot, and subsequent series, was reworked to revolve around an SNL-style series. Fey signed a contract with NBC in May 2003, which allowed her to remain in her SNL head writer position until at least the 2004–2005 television season. As part of the contract, Fey was required to develop a primetime project to be produced by Broadway Video, Lorne Michaels' production company, and NBC Universal. During the 2004–2005 pilot season, Fey began developing a pilot project under the working title Untitled Tina Fey Project. The pilot, which became 30 Rock, centered on the head writer of a variety show and how she managed her relationships with the show's volatile star and executive producer. During development, some characters were altered; a second star of the variety show was added and the executive producer role changed to network executive.

=== Casting ===
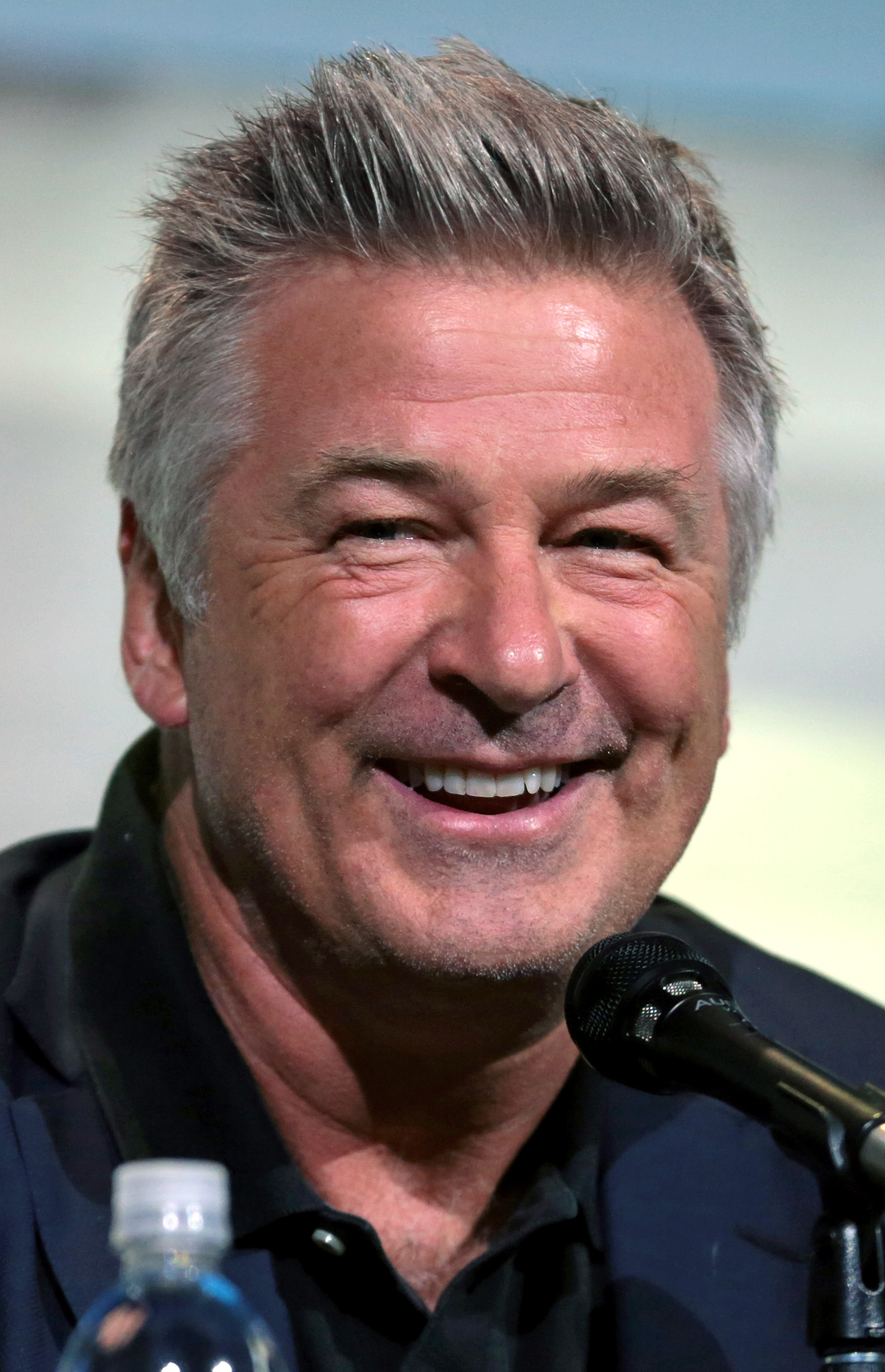
The part of Jack Donaghy was written with Alec Baldwin in mind.

Fey worked with Jennifer McNamara and Adam Bernstein for the casting of the series. Their first decision was for Fey to portray the lead character, Liz Lemon. Fey acknowledged similarities between Liz and her own life when she became head writer on SNL, primarily a heavy focus on her job. Fey asked one of her castmates on SNL, Tracy Morgan, to play Tracy Jordan. Morgan believed the role was "right up [his] alley and it was tailor made for [him]", and Fey noted that Tracy Jordan "acts wild" like Tracy Morgan did at SNL.

Fey wrote the character of naïve NBC page Kenneth Parcell with her friend Jack McBrayer, who has been described as "the show's brightest discovery", in mind. She has said that she "really wanted him for that part and was very happy when no one objected". Shortly after McBrayer's casting, Alec Baldwin was cast as Jack Donaghy, the "totally uncensored" vice president of East Coast Television and Microwave Oven Programming. Fey had written the part with Baldwin in mind, but was "very pleasantly surprised when he agreed to do it". As the series progressed, "the push-pull [relationship] between Fey's character, Liz Lemon, the harried head writer of The Girlie Show, and Alec Baldwin's domineering network executive, Jack Donaghy" helped the show find "its rhythm".

Judah Friedlander was cast as the staff writer of The Girlie Show, Frank Rossitano. Before auditioning for the role, Friedlander and Fey had never met. His character was based on at least two writers with whom Fey used to work at SNL, but he "certainly brought some of [his] own things to it, as well", including his trucker hat-wearing persona. Fey based the role of Pete Hornberger, a long-time friend of Liz's and producer of The Girlie Show, on Scott Adsit, who agreed to portray the character.

In an unaired pilot for 30 Rock, Rachel Dratch, a former SNL cast member, originally played the role of Jenna DeCarlo. In August 2006, executive producer Lorne Michaels announced that Dratch would be replaced as Jenna, but would portray different roles in other episodes. In the retooled pilot, Dratch appears as The Girlie Show's cat wrangler. Later in the month, NBC announced that Jane Krakowski had replaced Dratch in the role of Jenna, and that the character was renamed Jenna Maroney. Michaels said that "everyone is thrilled that she is joining the cast", and thought she was going to be a "perfect fit".

=== Trivection oven ===
The Trivection oven is a convection microwave created by General Electric. At the time of broadcast, General Electric was the parent company for NBC, which produced and broadcast 30 Rock. During the episode, Jack Donaghy describes the product, claiming to have invented it himself and pegging it as his "greatest triumph" after years and years of market research. Donaghy's description of the product was taken near verbatim from GE's website. He later uses the oven as a metaphor for The Girlie Show, saying that Tracy Jordan is the "third heat".

The Trivection oven's inclusion in 30 Rock was widely seen as an example of product placement, especially as the product was later advertised during the commercial break. However, Fey stated the oven was actually included in the show purely as a joke and that GE had nothing to do with it, although she suspects, "maybe somebody's taking credit for it." Allison Eckelkamp, a spokesperson for GE, confirmed this and says that GE chose to run ads for the oven during the commercial break to make sure viewers knew it was a real product, rather than one invented by the screenwriters for the purposes of the joke.

== Reception ==
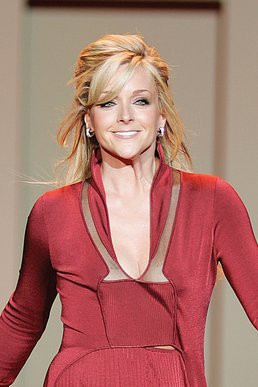
Jane Krakowski received praise for her portrayal of Jenna Maroney.

This episode was viewed by 8.13 million viewers and received a Nielsen rating of 2.9/8 in the key adults 18–49 demographic. This episode was the highest rated of the series until October 2008, when the third-season premiere episode, "Do-Over", was viewed by 8.7 million viewers. That episode received a 4.1/10 in the 18–49 demographic. In the United Kingdom, the episode attracted 700,000 viewers, 6% of that time slot's viewing audience. The director of this episode, Adam Bernstein, was nominated for the Directors Guild of America Award for "Outstanding Directorial Achievement in Comedy Series", in 2007. Bernstein lost to Richard Shepard for his work on the Ugly Betty pilot.

"Pilot" was generally well received by critics. Metacritic gave the episode a Metascore–a weighted average based on the impressions of a select 31 critical reviews–of 67 out of 100. Tom Gliatto of People Weekly and Anna Johns of AOL's TV Squad declared 30 Rock the best new comedy of the season. Johns described Tracy Jordan's line, "I'm from the government and I'm here to inspect your chicken nuggets" as "confoundingly funny", and praised Jane Krakowski's replacement of Rachel Dratch in the Jenna role. Keith Watson of Metro said that "It may just be a Mary Tyler Moore Show for the [21st century], but 30 Rock, er, rocks". Watson rated the episode 4 out of 5 stars. Dorothy Rabinowitz of The Wall Street Journal praised the "hilarious scenes and fine ensemble cast", particularly commenting on Jack McBrayer's performance as Kenneth Parcell and Rachel Dratch's portrayal of the cat-wrangler, Greta Johansen.

Not all critics liked the episode. Oscar Dahl of BuddyTV felt that this episode did not live up to the show's potential. San Francisco Chronicle's Tim Goodman lamented that "the original [episode] was funnier" than the one that aired. Tom Shales of Washington Post said that "the show needs a better premise and funnier dialogue". Despite this, Shales said that 30 Rock "is not a self-important bore like Studio 60 on the Sunset Strip", and praised Tracy Morgan's performance as Tracy Jordan. The New York Times' Alessandra Stanley praised Alec Baldwin's "slyly absurd comic presence that is bigger and brighter than any joke or character actor on the show", but mentioned that "Nothing very funny happens on 30 Rock until Alec Baldwin enters the room, and suddenly this new NBC sitcom comes alive". Fey herself felt the episode did not introduce the show well, calling it "awkward, sweaty...I never want to watch that mess again" in her memoir Bossypants.
