= Somebody to Love (30 Rock) =

- 30 Rock episode
- Episode no.: Season 2 Episode 6
- Directed by: Beth McCarthy
- Written by: Kay Cannon; Tina Fey
- Cinematography by: Vanja Černjul
- Production code: 207
- Original air date: November 15, 2007

Guest appearances
- Fred Armisen as Raheem Haddad; Kevin Brown as Dot Com Slattery; Grizz Chapman as Gris Griswold; Edie Falco as C.C. Cunningham; John Lutz as J.D. Lutz; Maulik Pancholy as Jonathan; Kristen Wiig as Candace Van Der Shark

Episode chronology
← Previous "Greenzo"	Next → "Cougars"
- 30 Rock season 2

"Somebody to Love" is the sixth episode of the second season of 30 Rock, and the twenty-seventh episode overall. It was written by Kay Cannon and the series' creator, Tina Fey, and was directed by Beth McCarthy. The episode first aired on November 15, 2007 on the NBC network in the United States. Guest stars in this episode include Fred Armisen, Kevin Brown, Grizz Chapman, Edie Falco, John Lutz, Maulik Pancholy, and Kristen Wiig.

The episode focuses on Jack Donaghy's (Alec Baldwin) first meeting with Celeste "C.C." Cunningham (Edie Falco), (played in a movie-of-the-week by Kristen Wiig); Liz Lemon (Tina Fey) believes that her new neighbor, Raheem Haddad (Fred Armisen), is a terrorist; and Kenneth Parcell (Jack McBrayer) accidentally loses a pair of Jack's trousers. Kristen Wiig makes an appearance in a movie-of-the-week as C.C. Cunningham.

== Plot ==
At a party in honor of Robert Novak, which is being thrown by John McCain and Jack Bauer, Jack Donaghy meets C.C., the Democratic congresswoman for Vermont. After the party, Jack and C.C. go back to Jack's apartment and have sex together. The following morning, Jack discovers that C.C. is suing the Sheinhardt Wig Company, the fictional subsidiary of General Electric (GE) and owner of NBC, the company that Jack works for. This is because the company is allegedly leaking Auburn Fantasy Dye Number 260 into the Chicktaugua River, causing the children of Chickataugua to turn orange. After discovering that Jack works for GE, C.C. leaves and goes to work at Bill Clinton's office in Harlem. Jack and Tracy Jordan (Tracy Morgan), follow her there and Jack and C.C. decide to carry on their relationship in secret.

Liz is worried when she smells maple syrup in her apartment and Jack tells her that it could be the chemical agent Northrax. She suspects that her new neighbour, Raheem (Fred Armisen), is a terrorist because he has maps in his apartment and she has seen him and his brother, Hakeem (Hamza Ahmed), on an agility course in the park. At Jack's advice, Liz reports him in to Homeland Security, but is shocked to discover that the pair are auditioning for The Amazing Race and, in fact, not terrorists.

After bringing Jack's suit back from the dry cleaners, Kenneth discovers that he has lost the suit's trousers. Frank Rossitano (Judah Friedlander), James "Toofer" Spurlock (Keith Powell) and Josh Girard (Lonny Ross) pay him to complete various dares so that he can pay for a new pair of trousers, with the first one involving eating a two-year expired bottle of ketchup.

== Production ==
Fred Armisen and Kristen Wiig, who play Raheem and Candace Van der Shark in the episode, have both appeared in the main cast of Saturday Night Live, a weekly sketch comedy series which airs on NBC in the United States. Tina Fey was the head writer on Saturday Night Live from 1999 until 2006. Various other cast members of Saturday Night Live have appeared on 30 Rock, including Rachel Dratch, Will Forte, Jason Sudeikis, Molly Shannon and Chris Parnell. Tina Fey and Tracy Morgan have both been part of the main cast of Saturday Night Live. Alec Baldwin has also hosted Saturday Night Live fifteen times, the highest number of episodes of any host of the series.

This episode was the second episode, after "Greenzo", to air since the start of the 2007–2008 Writers Guild of America strike, which began on November 5, 2007 and ended on February 12, 2008, 100 days later. This episode was the first to contain reference to the strike. The reference occurs when C.C. is being interviewed on MSNBC and the news crawl below reads "News crawl affected by writers strike. Using repeat text from previous season." This episode was filmed in early October, 2007. This was the ninth episode written by Tina Fey and the second written by Kay Cannon. It was the third episode directed by Beth McCarthy.

== Reception ==
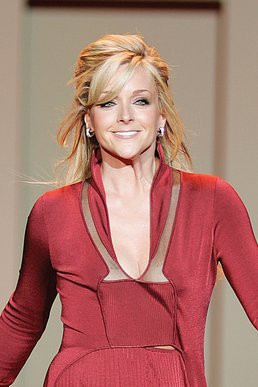
Robert Canning of IGN thought that the absence of Jane Krakowski as Jenna Maroney "proved the character [...] simply isn't necessary."

"Somebody to Love" brought in an average of 6.4 million viewers. The episode also achieved a 3.2/8 in the key 18- to 49-year-old demographic, the highest result in that demographic since the episode "SeinfeldVision" aired on October 4, 2007. The 3.2 refers to 3.2% of all 18- to 49-year-olds in the U.S., and the 8 refers to 8% of all 18- to 49-year-olds watching television at the time of the broadcast in the U.S.. 30 Rock ranked in first place in the male 18–34 demographic, for its 8:30 p.m – 9:00 pm timeslot.

Robert Canning of IGN thought that the episode "was 30 Rock's best episode of the season [so far], if not the best episode ever from this young series." Canning also said that "this was just a fantastic, funny episode of 30 Rock. It was also an episode that once again proved the character of Jenna Maroney (Jane Krakowski), who was completely absent from this half-hour, simply isn't necessary when you've got Tracy Jordan talking to a pigeon on a trash can." Canning rated this episode "9.5 out of 10." Matt Webb Mitovich of TV Guide wrote that "it's not surprising that – in my opinion, at least – it fell juuuuuuust [sic] a bit short. It's almost as if the funniest parts of the Edie Falco story were played by [Kristen] Wiig in the Lifetime movie." He thought that "the 'Liz suspects the neighbor is a terrorist' story played out rather well." Jeff Labrecque of Entertainment Weekly wrote that "Overall, [this was] another splendid [episode]. My only beef was with the Verizon bit. 30 Rock normally does a splendid job of balancing the corporate elements of television, often utilizing it for comic fodder. But the winking cell phone banter lacked subtlety, and it seemed to me like the show was trying to have its cake and eat it, too."

Beth McCarthy, the director of this episode, was nominated for the Directors Guild of America Award for Outstanding Directing – Comedy Series.
