= Jack Donaghy =

Fictional character on "30 Rock"

- 30 Rock character
- Alec Baldwin as Jack Donaghy
- First appearance: "Pilot" (2006)
- Last appearance: "30 Rock: A One-Time Special" (2020)
- Created by: Tina Fey
- Portrayed by: Alec Baldwin

In-universe information
- Family: Milton Greene (biological father); Jimmy Donaghy (adoptive father); Colleen Donaghy (mother); Eddie Donaghy (brother); Patrick Donaghy (brother); Patricia Donaghy (sister); Katherine Donaghy (sister); Spider-Man Green (half-brother)
- Spouses: Bianca (divorced); Avery Jessup (divorced); Liz Lemon (annulled)
- Children: Liddy Donaghy
- Relatives: Tim Donaghy (cousin)

John Francis "Jack" Donaghy (/ˈdɒnəɡi/ DON-ə-ghee) is a fictional character on the NBC sitcom 30 Rock, airing from 2006 to 2013. The character was created by series creator Tina Fey, and is portrayed by Alec Baldwin. He was introduced as the Vice President of East Coast Television and Microwave Oven Programming for General Electric. As Vice President, he serves as the protagonist Liz Lemon's (Fey) boss as well as her personal mentor. As the series progresses, their relationship develops and informs their respective storylines. Donaghy climbs up the corporate hierarchy to achieve his professional dream of leading General Electric as its president and chairman.

Donaghy's penchant for wealth, power, authority, conservative values, and social status has been acclaimed as a high point of the series and his characterization. Fey intended for the character to serve as an oppositional but complementary counter to Lemon, expressed through various gender, social, and power dynamics. Baldwin received two Primetime Emmy Awards, three Golden Globe Awards, seven Screen Actors Guild Awards, and one Television Critics Association Award for his portrayal of this character.

== Storylines and characteristics ==
John Francis Donaghy had an unhappy and impoverished childhood in South Boston and in the fictional suburb of Sadchester, Massachusetts. When he was two, Jack's presumed father lured him to the edge of a swimming pool with a puppy and pushed him in the pool, and later abandoned his family. His mother Colleen Murphy Donaghy has nagged him his whole life, even blaming him for John F. Kennedy's death and for his father leaving. However, she was also devoted to her children. For example, it was noted that she had traded sexual favors with (the fictional) Frederick August Otto Schwarz III for Christmas presents for Jack and his siblings. Young Jack took to calling his collie "Pop" until the dog was accidentally run over by the mailman and intentionally left to die in the street by his mother. The dog had earlier been neutered, causing Jack to charge his mother with "cutting Pop's balls off." His mother even tried to send him to Vietnam when he was 12 to make a man out of him. He also played hockey, the piano and the flute as a child, prompting his mother to embarrass him by having him play "The Star-Spangled Banner" on said flute in front of the hockey team, which he also captained.

Due to his family's poverty, Donaghy began working at the age of 12, as a stevedore at the Port of Boston. He attended Princeton University on a handsomeness scholarship, where he played football and baseball for the Tigers, joined the Princeton Charter Club, played Maria in an all-male production of West Side Story, was a member of the "Twig and Plums" secret society, and was a classmate of Michelle Obama. In addition to the Amory Blaine Handsomeness Scholarship, his jobs during college included "the day shift at a graveyard, and the graveyard shift for the Days Inn"; working as a janitor at a primate laboratory; and a job for the linguistics department recording every word in the English language, to preserve the perfect American accent in case of nuclear war. He laments that his voice has been dragged into various things like Thomas the Tank Engine and Wu-Tang Clan songs. (This joke refers to Alec Baldwin's role as a storyteller for Thomas and Friends in the U.S., seasons 5 and 6. He was also cast in the role of Mr. Conductor in Thomas and the Magic Railroad in 2000.) Subsequently, the linguistics department sold his voice to GE for use in their microwaves. He later attended Harvard Business School, which he paid for by working as a Swan Boat operator, and where he was voted "Most" by his classmates.

Post-college, Jack worked as an intern for Senator Ted Kennedy, where Jack displayed an extremely liberal political world-view, even by the standards of a young Al Gore. At some point, though as yet unexplained, he underwent a complete reversal of his philosophy and became a conservative Republican. Jack participated in Hands Across America and at some point personally coined the phrase "what's the upside?" He confessed that Carly Simon's 1972 hit song "You're So Vain" was, in fact, written by him.

In the years after working for Kennedy, Jack "thrived" on fear, bow hunting polar bears, climbing Mount Kilimanjaro, once driving a rental car into the Hudson River to practice escaping, showering with Greta Van Susteren and overcoming a peanut allergy through sheer willpower. Jack once practiced martial arts under Chuck Norris, but they had a falling out after he switched to another dojo.

It is revealed in "Live from Studio 6H" that, as a young employee in the GE poisons division in 1986, Jack answered phones during a live telethon. During that broadcast, Tracy Jordan realized his talent for getting laughs as a performer. A 16-year-old Liz Lemon made a prank call, claiming to have been a nurse in the war who was impregnated by General Electric when he was Colonel Electric. Jack's loyalty to GE and his handsomeness impressed Don Geiss, who transferred Jack to the microwave ovens division. At some point, he also rotated through GE's plastics division, where he befriended the "brilliant plastics engineer/lesbian", Gretchen Thomas. After years of market research, he finally made his "greatest triumph" in the form of the Trivection oven, a product he created at General Electric, having first envisioned it while responding to Liz Lemon's prank call in 1986. It was on the strengths of the Trivection oven that, in mid-2006, he replaced recently deceased Gary to become Vice President of East Coast Television and Microwave Oven Programming.

Jack was the architect of bringing Tracy Jordan on board the NBC sketch show The Girlie Show, despite the objections of head writer/creator Liz Lemon and producer Pete Hornberger. Jack made sure that Tracy was the main star and ensured the show's name was changed to TGS with Tracy Jordan after bribing a focus group with pizza. Other shows that NBC purchases while he is an executive include MILF Island and Queen of Jordan.

Jack's mother still constantly calls him and she wants to move in with him, away from her retirement home in Jupiter, Florida, which has rocks made of foam because she tends to fall down a lot. However, at the end of the episode, he blackmails Josh Girard into taking all his mother's calls for him for the rest of Josh's life (Jack says that his mother will outlive Josh - "she's like Castro"), since Josh has a flawless "Jack Donaghy" impersonation. In the wake of the episode "Fireworks," Jack is demoted to Vice President of East Coast Television when CEO Don Geiss takes his microwave oven programming duties away from him, although a comment to Liz suggests that it may have been given back to him. At some point, he wrote a book entitled Jack Attack: The Art of Aggression in Business.

Acting on Don Geiss' advice, Jack gets engaged to Christie's auctioneer Phoebe. However, Liz later discovers that Phoebe is actually an unscrupulous gold digger who is pretending to be English. Jack refuses to believe this since Phoebe had told him that Liz is infatuated with him and he decides to continue with their wedding. The situation is resolved when Jack has a heart attack while in bed with Phoebe, and realizes while recovering in the hospital during a conversation with Liz, Phoebe and his mother that he is in fact not in love with Phoebe. During this conversation, Jack's mother uses his heart monitor as a lie detector. Jack recovers from his heart attack and becomes a candidate to succeed Don Geiss as CEO of GE, competing against his arch-rival, Vice-President of West Coast Television Devon Banks, who, despite being openly gay, has gotten engaged to Geiss' oblivious daughter Kathy. Jack momentarily wins the coveted job of Geiss' replacement, only to lose it when Geiss slips into a diabetic coma. Banks makes a power grab, convincing the board of directors that the CEO's seat should stay with the family and getting his fiancée Kathy appointed, with Banks as the power behind the throne. Jack is demoted and humiliated, and leaves GE for a position in George W. Bush's administration. This proves to be hopeless, and Jack attempts to get himself fired. He succeeds this by funding a "gay bomb," a weapon that would cause enemy soldiers to "go totally gaybones for each other." The chemical weapon is accidentally released in a secret war bunker, and it is implied that Jack has sex with Dick Cheney. This implication is furthered when Jack later confesses his sins to an ill-prepared priest.

Jack starts out again at GE — in the mailroom. He works his way up to the top again in amazingly rapid fashion, however. Jack contemplates having sex with Kathy Geiss to save the company from Banks' plan to shut GE down completely for two years, but is able to avoid this with Liz's help. In the end, Kathy signs a contract making Jack her main business advisor, and Banks takes off. Don Geiss emerges from his coma shortly thereafter, but stuns Jack with the news that he has decided to stay on as GE's chairman after all. Jack remains in his position as head of NBC, telling Liz Lemon how many times an episode she can use the phrase "cat anus". Jack discovers that Jimmy Donaghy is not his real father. Similar to the plot of Mamma Mia, Jack finds that he has three possible fathers. Liz invites them to TGS saying they won a contest, and Jack quickly finds that his father is Milton Greene, a Bennington College professor. Getting in an argument with Milton about politics, he says to Liz that he does not want to tell Milton, but Liz convinces him otherwise. After Jack tells Milton that he is Milton's son, Milton tells Jack he needs a kidney or he will die. Jack finds that he is not a match and organizes a "We Are the World"-type charity called "Kidney Now," with celebrities singing a song that asks anyone who is a match to give Milton a kidney. One of the celebrities, Elvis Costello, ultimately proves to be a match and saves Milton's life himself.

Devon Banks comes back at Jack with a revenge plan involving the United States government trying to shut down GE. Jack is able to get out of it, however. Jack is described by his assistant Jonathan as being the "best gift giver in the world." One year, Jonathan bought Jack a $95 bottle of olive oil for Christmas and in return Jack had Jonathan's sister released from a North Korean jail. When Liz and Jack finally agree to exchange gifts, they agree on spending zero dollars for each other (with both trying to one-up the other). Jack has Jonathan drive all over Pennsylvania to find a program of Liz's production of The Crucible, framed in wood from her stage and not reimbursing Jonathan for gas. Liz calls in a bomb threat at Penn Station (getting Frank, Toofer, and Lutz arrested in the process) to keep Jack's high school crush, Nancy, in town. Finally, Jack brings in Liz's childhood crush, Larry Wilcox (in-costume as Jon Baker), as a date for her.

Donaghy's goal is to lead "the General" and become CEO of General Electric, like his mentors Geiss and Jack Welch. This appears to become impossible in 2010 when he learns from his girlfriend Avery that Philadelphia-based cable company Kabletown has bought NBC from GE. At first, Jack doubts the story because he hasn't heard anything, but then he finds out from Welch that the sale is happening and that Geiss is dead. Jack connects with an old colleague from GE who left to join Kabletown, and discovers that NBC's new owners don't make anything, they get over 90% of their revenue from men ordering porn on demand. This worries Jack, until he has an idea for Kabletown to create "porn for women," essentially women paying to have men on their TV screens listen to them talk and nod approvingly.

Still, Jack is less than satisfied at Kabletown, in large part because the company manufactures no tangible goods. He misses his days developing products and visiting factory floors during his tenures in GE's poisons, plastics, and microwave ovens divisions. He attempts to remedy his malaise by convincing Kabletown's chairman, Hank Hooper, to increase corporate synergy by establishing a subsidiary, Kouchtown to manufacture couches and market them to NBC's & Kabletown's viewers. Comically sub-par American craftsmanship and production values, however, doom his initiative. He is able to recover some of the investment by selling the otherwise unmarketable to the CIA as torture devices; doing so serendipitously benefits Jack when one of the couches causes an interrogated North Korean to reveal information vital to Avery's rescue.

Through triple-dealing and misdirection that put Machiavelli to shame, Jack manages to finally dispatch his precocious young nemesis, Kaylie Hooper on her grandfather's ("Poppop"'s) birthday and secure the appointment to Kabletown's chairmanship from the retiring Hank. Despite his substantially increased power, wealth, and the hatred from liberals, Jack finds himself even less content than he was prior to the Kouchtown fiasco. After a quick series of innovations at the start of his chairmanship (appointing NBC's ultimately longest-serving president, effectively eliminating Kabletown's worthless Indian customer service call centre to provide the same service at zero cost, and introducing GE's Six Sigma process in place of Kabletown's kitten in spaghetti), Jack abruptly resigns and sets off to sail the world alone in search of happiness. His trip succeeds within a matter of seconds; having barely left the riverbank, he conceives of his greatest innovation: transparent dishwashers that allow the consumer to observe the cleaning action. Within months, he has sold the idea to his former employer, General Electric, and finds himself in his lifelong dream job: chairman of GE.

Despite Jack's belief in the value of change and innovation, he is obsessed with his preferred office design and recreates it wherever he goes. When he takes over as NBC's Vice President of East Coast Television and Microwave Programming, he orders the late Gary's former office to be immediately remodelled. For a week-long junket to Boston to visit Nancy, Jack uses an "office replication service" to recreate the interior design for his temporary workspace at the local affiliate's studios and is surprised that Liz has not done likewise. When he executive produces Kidnapped by Danger: The Avery Jessup Story, brought to you with limited commercial interruptions by Pride Bladder Control Pants. Pride: Make every room a bathroom, he ensures that his office is meticulously recreated on-set for an accurate depiction. Upon moving upstairs as the new chairman of Kabletown (eschewing Kabletown's primary headquarters in Philadelphia, Jack has Hank Hooper's former suite remodelled to perfectly duplicate the office which Jack had left to Kenneth, the only differences being the greater exterior view, more assistants in the anteroom, and a Kabletown sign behind one assistant's desk. Months later, as chairman of General Electric, he likewise remodels Kathy Geiss' former suite into yet another duplicate, with the GE logo behind the same assistant's desk in the anteroom.

=== Relationships ===
Long before the events of the series, Jack had married an Italian woman named Bianca (Isabella Rossellini), with whom he had sex on the floor of the Concorde shortly after their wedding, though he claims his mother deliberately had a heart attack to prevent him from going on his honeymoon. He and Bianca were eventually legally separated in 1989 because, in his words, he "couldn't keep up with her on any level." Though they weren't legally divorced, Jack went on to introduce Bianca as though they were. When Bianca shows up, Jack passes Liz off as his girlfriend to make Bianca jealous. When Liz pretends Jack has proposed to her, Bianca attacks her and Jack is finally satisfied that Bianca still wants him. The couple finally officially divorce after 18 years of legal separation. Jack acquires "full stake in the Arby's franchises [he and Bianca] bought outside of Telluride" in the divorce settlement.

Jack had a brief relationship with Phoebe (Emily Mortimer), an allegedly English auctioneer, and goes as far as proposing marriage. Even after Liz discovers that Phoebe is a gold-digger, it is only during a heart-attack-causing argument with his mother Colleen that Jack realizes that he does not love Phoebe, and calls off the engagement at the end of Season 1.

Jack begins a relationship with liberal Congresswoman Celeste "CC" Cunningham (Edie Falco). In spite of their ideological differences, they are a well-matched pair and, after a period of secrecy, eventually go public. Their bliss does not last long, as their long-distance relationship begins to negatively affect both their jobs, and they break up.

After accidentally breaking both of his mother's hips, Jack is forced to allow her to move in with him. He hires an attractive Puerto Rican nurse, Elisa Padriera (Salma Hayek), to care for his mother. Jack falls in love with Elisa and proposes marriage to her. Later, after Elisa confesses to murdering her former husband, they choose to not marry.

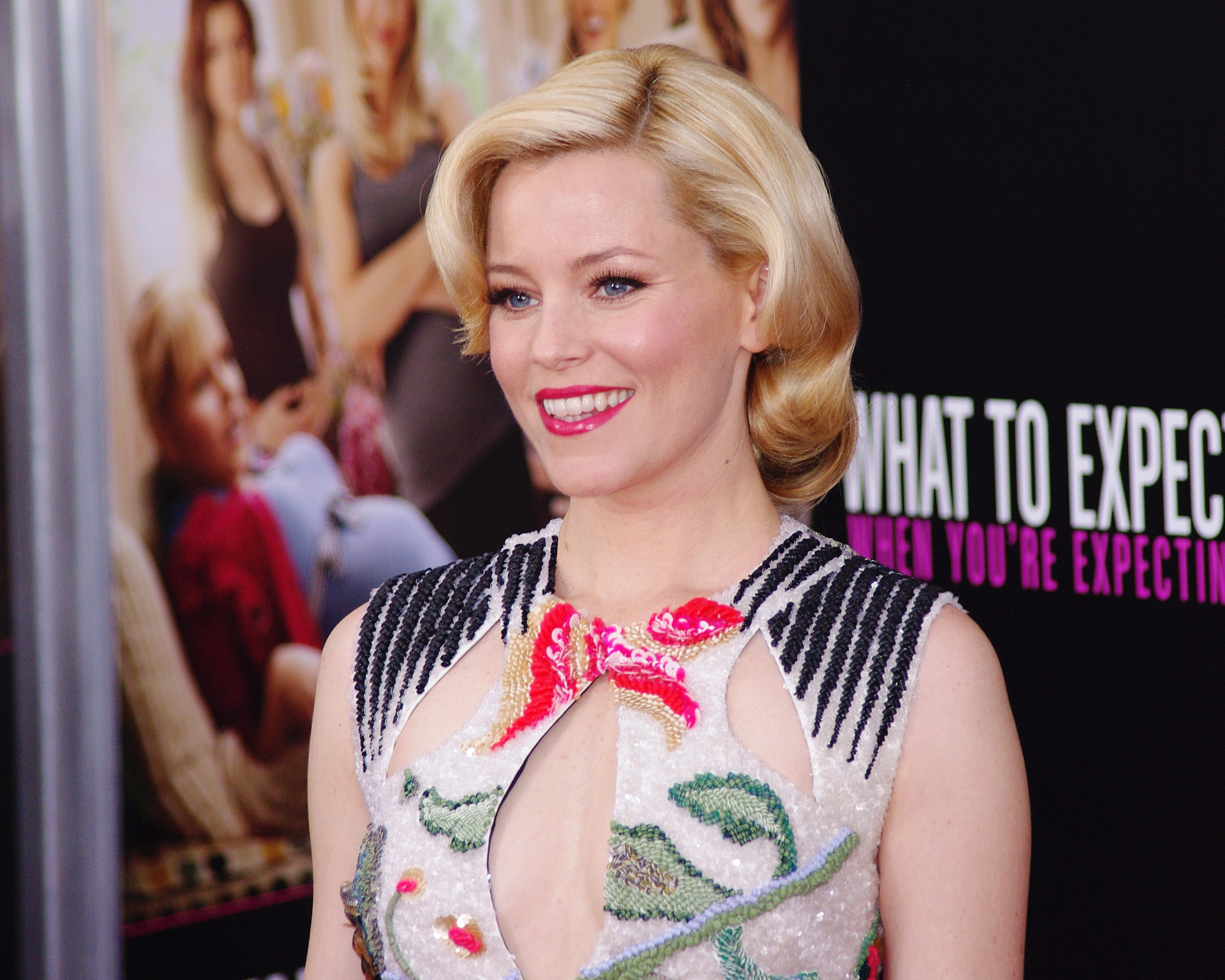
Elizabeth Banks portrays Avery Jessup.

Jack has a reunion with Nancy Donovan (Julianne Moore), his old high school crush. He is torn between her and his new flame, CNBC anchor Avery Jessup (Elizabeth Banks). After having sex with Nancy, he confesses that he is in love with both Nancy and another woman. Avery and Nancy meet by chance, and Nancy discovers that Avery is pregnant. Nancy is the one who tells Jack. Unbeknownst to Avery, Liz and Jack are accidentally married to each other in the Caribbean. The officiant whom Jack and Avery had hired for their wedding did not speak English and in due course honestly mistook Liz for the bride because she answered his request for a vow of commitment "oui" while wearing a white tennis dress and a white mosquito net (her clothes having been lost in an luggage mishap) and standing next to Jack at the altar (as best man after Bob Ballard failed to make it). Liz uses the situation to blackmail Jack into restoring TGS's budget, in exchange for signing the annulment documents and ceasing to give his [legally their] money away to fund projects like The Jack and Elizabeth Donaghy High School for Teen Drama, The Arts, and Feelings. With Jack and Avery properly married, their daughter is born while in Canada (despite their efforts to cross the border and ensure she is born in America so she will be constitutionally eligible to become President). Despite Avery's concerns about the closeness of Jack and Liz's mentor-protégé relationship, the couple name their daughter Elizabeth Donaghy. They, however, call her "Liddy" as an honor to Elizabeth "Liddy" Dole, G. Gordon Liddy, and Jack's martial arts teacher, Lih De. Their pediatrician is, by unhappy coincidence, named Dr. Kevorkian. Avery is kidnapped and held hostage in North Korea. While Avery is held captive, Jack finds consolation in Avery's mother, Diana. The two end up sharing a kiss in the days before Avery returns home. Jack never masturbates during Avery's absence, as he claims to have never "Mommy Daddy sheet monstered" himself. Avery returns to the United States in exchange for a North Korean spy, Jack having unwittingly facilitated the exchange when he sold horribly uncomfortable Kouchtown couches to the CIA as interrogation tools. Jack and Avery plan to renew their vows but eventually divorce each other because of Jack's relationship with Avery's mother and Avery's relationship with Scott Scottsman, a fellow former captive. Jack also admits that he and Avery only married because of Avery's pregnancy.

After his marriage ends, Jack settles into a pattern of casual sexual relationships, including dating several women at once, each to fulfill a different need — including heiress Pizzarina Sbarro (Nina Arianda) — which he calls "Great Escaping". He also admits to Liz that he had sex with Jenna "a lot" in Season 3. In the series finale, He reconnects with ex-girlfriends Nancy and Elisa, convincing them to embark in a group relationship despite both women's devout Catholicism and Elisa's imprisonment in a Puerto Rican prison.

== Personality ==
In a 2008 interview with Playboy, as well in various other interviews, Tina Fey has said that Jack Donaghy is inspired by Saturday Night Live creator and showrunner Lorne Michaels. In a different interview on NPR's Wait Wait... Don't Tell Me!, Baldwin stated some of his inspiration for Donaghy was drawn from Michaels.

Despite being brilliant and slick, Jack is portrayed as a scrupulous network executive with an affinity for overtly backhanded compliments which are usually directed towards TGS head writer Liz Lemon (whom he almost always refers to by her surname). Although his first priority is to run a successful business, Jack often shows a human side, as when he doesn't fire Kenneth Parcell after beating him at poker when Kenneth bet his job, or when he rushes to take Liz home after oral surgery despite being with his then girlfriend, Avery. He has made it clear that he respects Liz's abilities and considers her a friend, albeit by calling for her advice at odd times. He briefly tried to develop a friendly relationship with the writers, particularly Liz, and made it clear that his feelings were hurt when Liz told him to stay out of the writers' room (although he apparently couldn't let go of his pride to say this directly).

However, he still has distinct personality flaws. For example, he changes the name of The Girlie Show without consulting Liz and then refuses to tell Jenna that Liz had nothing to do with it, because he thinks Liz needs to learn how to handle her employees. After discovering that a product he helped create for Tracy Jordan was dangerous, he decides to sell it overseas to get around U.S. safety regulations. At the very least, however, he said he admired Tracy's integrity for choosing to back out of the enterprise.

Nevertheless, Jack remains close enough to his NBC coworkers to attend their social functions. In asking Avery to be his "plus-one" at the wedding of TGS receptionist Cerie Xerox, Jack notes "You do not want to miss this wedding, it's going to be New York royalty: the Astors, the Rockefellers, the Sbarros," to which a delighted Avery replies "I know Jack. You think I don't want to know what Pizzerina Sbarro is going to be wearing?"

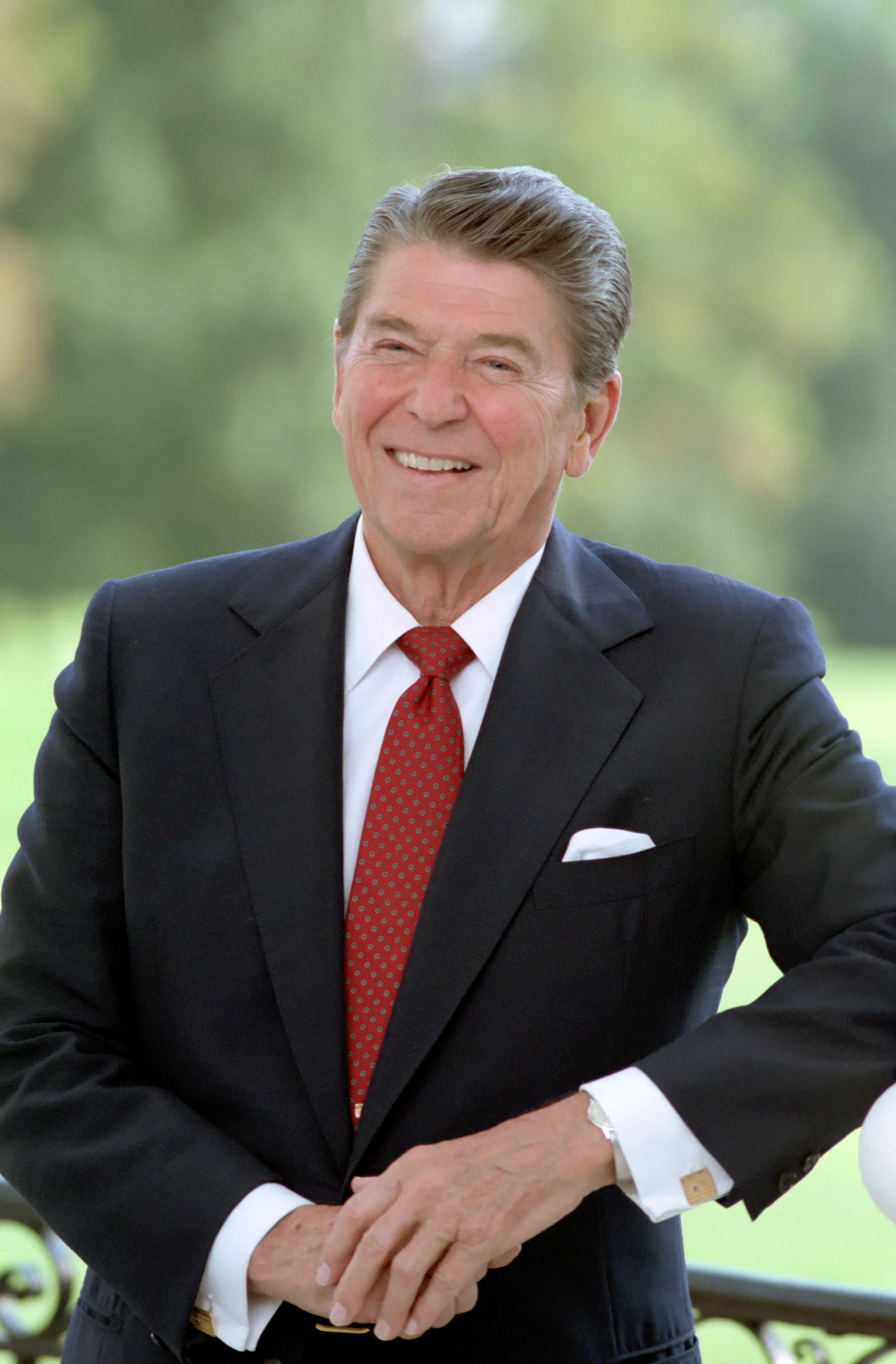
An icon among Republicans, U.S. President Ronald Reagan is regarded to Jack as a spiritual leader akin to Jesus Christ.

Jack is a conservative Republican (initially supporting Mitt Romney). Jack idolizes Ronald Reagan who, prior to holding elected office, had been a corporate spokesman for General Electric and host of the General Electric Theater. However, contrary to some conservative stereotypes, he apparently has no issue with homosexuality; he sets up Liz Lemon on a date with his lesbian friend, Gretchen Thomas, and Devon Banks' homosexuality is immaterial to Jack's intense loathing of, and rivalry with, him; Jack considers Devon to be the "gay me". Jack himself participated in a gay orgy under the influence of nerve agent being developed for a "gay bomb" during his brief tenure in the U.S. Department of Homeland Security. He convinces Hank Hooper to purchase the gay-themed network, TWINKS, and attempts to run it. Jack speaks disparagingly of most demographics; his mockery of Northern liberals and Southern conservatives in the same sentence in "Season 4" prompts Liz to remark, "Wow, you just don't like anyone, do you?" Despite his supposedly Conservative values, in the episode Greenzo, former Vice President Al Gore reveals that Jack was once an intern for Ted Kennedy and started to describe him as "the most liberal" before being cut off by Jack.

Jack is ostensibly Irish Catholic, and names his fists after St. Patrick and St. Michael (though he later states that he "has no faith, only capitalism"). He is a firm believer in capitalism, stating that "business gets me off", and that negotiation is his favorite thing in the world since it is, in his words, "the essence of capitalism." Jack's business background clashed with the show's staff when he insisted on having the show use product placement (or "product integration" as he calls it). Citing Six Sigma, Jack has also tried to involve himself with the staff. Much to Liz' annoyance, he has even tried to "help" her with issues in her personal life, his reasoning that the quality of her life will reflect the quality of her work. He starts his own winery, "Donaghy Estates", after purchasing a vineyard on the north fork of Long Island. Despite the wine being reviewed in Robert Parker's Wine Newsletter as tasting like "the urine of Satan after a hefty portion of asparagus," he attempts to market it to the hip-hop community as a replacement for Cristal champagne.

Jack dyes his hair and has it cut every two days (he declares that "your hair is your head-suit"), and is shown to be very formal. He almost always appears in a suit and he considers tuxedos appropriate evening wear for any occasion ("It's after six. What am I, a farmer?"). In contrast, Liz and the other writers wear casual clothing most of the time and appear generally laid-back. Liz suggests that Jack finds Asian women in their twenties especially attractive, though he has intimate relationships with women of other races including African-American Condoleezza Rice, Puerto Rican Elisa Pedrera and numerous Caucasians. He appears to agree with the other Kabletown executives that the most desirable trophy wives are half-Asian women. Jack collected cookie jars and displayed them at conventions using the alias "Victor Nightingale", but gave his collection to Kenneth when a private investigator told him that it could hurt his chances at getting Don Geiss's job as Chairman of GE.

According to Liz, Jack "goes to Sbarro when he's angry, the New York Stock Exchange when he's horny, and Christie's when he's depressed." He states in an NBC Business News interview that the individuals first on his speed dial are Warren Buffett on his BlackBerry and Jimmy Buffett on his iPhone. Jack is a talented painter and flautist, and can also do a backflip, which he states is "90% confidence." Jack has also expressed an interest in science and admits that as a child he wanted to be a marine biologist until his father discouraged him.

Though several characters on the show are portrayed as high-functioning alcoholics, Jack appears to be the only one who is chemically dependent on alcohol. This is evidenced by the fact that he experiences physical withdrawal symptoms when he attempts to stop drinking. Jack also appears to be an opportunistic substance abuser, given that, in various episodes, he drinks Kenneth's cough syrup in lieu of alcohol, sniffs paint (and Jenna's breath) to alleviate his alcohol withdrawal symptoms, scoffs at the notion of sober air travel, takes mysterious purple pills offered to him by Dr. Spaceman, and is shown on the cover of a 1985 GE Quarterly Newsletter claiming that a wheelbarrow full of cocaine was just out of view. While trying to adjust to life as a housewife, Liz finally realises that Jack did not have everything figured out and was "just an alcoholic with a great voice."

== Family ==
The Donaghys come from County Steve, Ireland, where they were "whiskey testers and goblins." The family dispute how to pronounce their surname, with some pronouncing it as "Donag-ee", "Dona-hee" or even "Dona-fee". Jack's very eccentric family sees much drama and infighting, and includes:

- Jimmy Donaghy (/ˈdɒnəfiː/, DON-ə-fee; Brian Murray) – Jack's father is closely allied with Eddie. Jack considers both of them a disgrace to the Donaghy name (which they both pronounce differently from Jack and each other). Jack also believes his father belongs in the "Smiling Irish Bastard Hall of Fame". It is later revealed that Jimmy is not Jack's biological father, as he was absent when Jack was conceived. Jack's mother had a sexual relationship with a man named Milton Green during this time, making him Jack's biological father.
- Colleen Donaghy (Elaine Stritch) – Jack's overbearing mother who lives in a Florida retirement home; her maiden name was Murphy, a family Jack considers to be "a bunch of mud farmers and sheep rapists". Despite Colleen being overbearing she actually likes Liz Lemon. She mistook Liz for Jack's fiancée, which was actually Phoebe; when Jack told her that it wasn't Liz whom he was marrying, Colleen's response was "Why the hell not?"
- Eddie Donaghy (/ˈdɒnəhiː/, DON-ə-hee; Nathan Lane) – Jack's brother with whom he's been in constant rivalry for years and who apparently works as a swindler. It is revealed that they both played very harsh tricks on each other during their childhood, such as Eddie blinding Jack with a bottle rocket, and Jack microwaving Eddie's parakeet. He also thinks that Liz could be "pretty...if [she] didn't scowl so much."
- Patrick Donaghy (Boris McGiver) – another brother.
- Patricia Donaghy (Siobhan Fallon) – Jack's sister.
- Katherine Catherine Donaghy (Molly Shannon) – Jack's other sister; married to a man named Bobby.
- Margaret (Alice Kremelberg) – a teenage relative seen sitting silently and scowling through the family reunion; she is implied to be his illegitimate sister, but it is also mentioned that she "certainly has Mom's smile." Her grin seems to imply that she enjoys when her new-found family fights.
- Tim Donaghy – Jack's cousin, a former NBA referee who bet on, and/or fixed, professional basketball games.
- Milton Green (Alan Alda) - Jack's affable biological father. Milton is a professor at Bennington College, and in desperate need of a new kidney when they first meet. Jack mounts a celebrity event to find Green a kidney. He subsequently receives one from Elvis Costello. Milton is a stereotypically liberal Vermont resident and a devotee of Jimmy Carter, on whom he is writing a multi-volume biography; this causes the conservative Jack no end of embarrassment and consternation. Betty White reads at least one volume.
- Spider-Man Green - Milton Green's son and Jack's half-brother. He named himself, a tradition in Milton's family at which both Jack and Avery scoff.
- Avery Jessup (Elizabeth Banks) - Jack's ex-wife and mother to their daughter, Liddy. She is kidnapped to North Korea and involuntarily married to Kim Jong-un. Avery was the First Lady of North Korea from 29 December 2011 until 10 May 2012. Avery returns to the United States in exchange for a North Korean spy. Jack and Avery plan to renew their vows, but eventually divorce each other because of Jack's relationship with Avery's mother and Avery's relationship with Scott Scottsman, a fellow former captive. Jack also admits that he and Avery got married because of their baby.
- Elizabeth "Liddy" Donaghy - Jack's Canadian-American daughter whom he sired with Avery. She is called Liddy in honour of Liddy Dole, G. Gordon Liddy, and Jack's martial arts instructor Li Di. Jack trains her to say his trademark, "Good God, Lemon," and she attends baby leadership conferences.
- Elizabeth "Liz" Lemon [briefly 'Elizabeth Donaghy'] (Tina Fey) - Jack's accidental ex-wife to whom he is technically married when the officiant of his and Avery's wedding mistook Liz as the bride because she was wearing tennis whites and a mosquito net. In the course of a feud between them during their brief marriage, Liz holds a press conference (dressed as Jacqueline Kennedy and impersonating Drew Barrymore's impression of "Little Edie" Beale) and announces that she and Jack have donated $5 million to The Jack and Elizabeth Donaghy High School for Teen Drama, The Arts, and Feelings. During a meeting with NBC human resource mediator Jeffrey Weinerslav, the two realize that they have had the longest and most meaningful relationship either of them has ever had, and apologize to each other with Liz agreeing to sign the annulment papers and Jack promising to restore TGS’s budget.

== Celebrity love interests ==
Before his marriage, Jack usually dated women who are celebrities or powerful figures in the media. Often, he hints that he is having or has had a relationship with them, but it is rarely explicitly stated. These women include:

- Greta Van Susteren, journalist (implied in "Jack-Tor" that Jack "showered with" her, before her head transplant)
- Condoleezza Rice, U.S. Secretary of State (possibly alluded to in "Pilot"; implied in "The Break Up"; confirmed in "The Source Awards" and "Everything Sunny All the Time Always")
- Maureen Dowd, journalist (implied in "The Rural Juror")
- Elizabeth Hurley, actress (mentioned in "Black Tie")
- Beyoncé Knowles, singer-actress (mentioned in "Black Tie")
- Martha Stewart, TV hostess (mentioned in "Black Tie")
- Alexis Stewart, daughter of Martha (mentioned in "Black Tie")
- Shakira, singer (mentioned in "Black Tie")
- Katie Couric, journalist (mentioned in "The C Word")
- Joan Baez, singer (mentioned in "Christmas Special")
- Kathy Hilton, actress and mother of Paris (mentioned, regretfully, in "The Ones")
- Peggy Fleming, American former figure skater (mentioned in "Apollo, Apollo")
- Dusty Springfield, British singer, "Jack's first love"
- Carla Bruni, wife of Nicolas Sarkozy (hinted in "Black Light Attack!", in which Jack says he has had office relationships only with women he could transfer or introduce to Sarkozy)
- Nikki Finke, journalist (mentioned in "Alexis Goodlooking and the Case of the Missing Whisky")

== See also ==
- Neil Bremer, the protagonist of Mr. Mayor, originally developed as an older Jack Donaghy before Alec Baldwin dropped out of the project and was replaced with Ted Danson.
