= Lonny Ross =

American comedy actor and writer

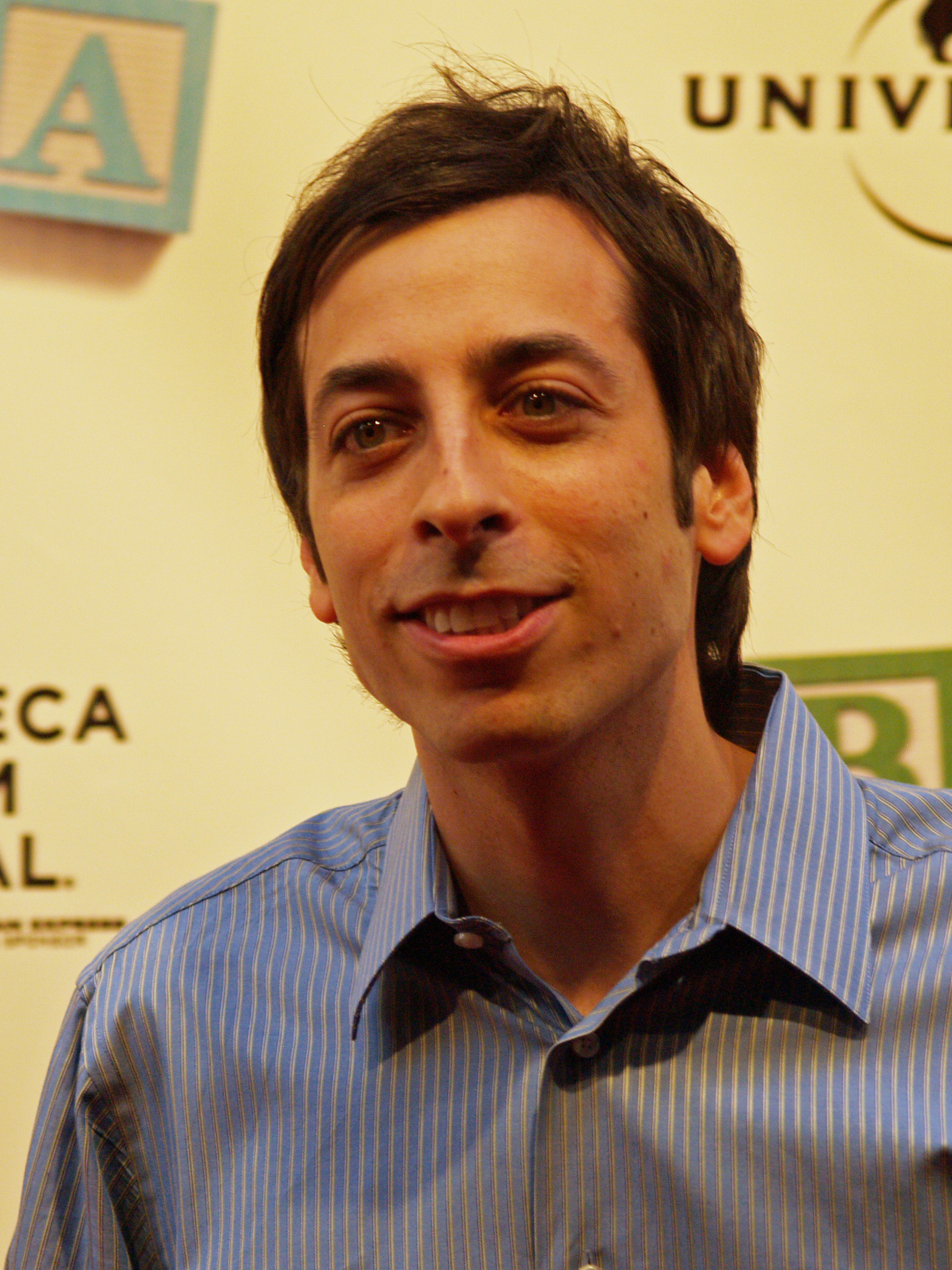
- Ross at the 2008 Tribeca Film Festival
- Born: 1978 (age 46–47); Wantagh, New York
- Occupation(s): Comedian, actor, writer
- Years active: 1999–present

Lonny Ross (born 1978) is an American comedy actor and writer.

== Early life ==
Ross was born in Wantagh, New York. He attended and graduated from Wantagh High School in 1996.

== Acting career ==
As part of the ensemble on the NBC sitcom 30 Rock, he received a nomination for a Screen Actors Guild Award for his work as Josh Girard. He appeared in 37 episodes between 2006 and 2009.

Lonny also appeared on the Cartoon Network live action series Level Up as Max Ross, the eccentric billionaire video-game designer. Lonny participated in a Level Up cast panel discussion at Comic-Con.

He has also appeared in the films Good Luck Chuck, The Rocker and College Road Trip.

He has written a comedy pilot for the Independent Film Channel, and a web series for Comedy Central.

== Filmography ==
=== Film ===
Year	Title	Role	Notes
2007	Watching the Detectives	Eager Customer	
2007	Good Luck Chuck	Joe	
2008	College Road Trip	Student Guide	
2008	The Rocker	Sticks	
2009	Labor Pains	Phillip	
2018	A Futile and Stupid Gesture	Ivan Reitman	

=== Television ===
Year	Title	Role	Notes
1999	Upright Citizens Brigade	Scared Straight Student/Spirituality Expo Patron	2 episodes
2004	Late Night with Conan O'Brien	Greg the NBC Page	1 episode
2006	The Tribe	Tolin	
2006–2009	30 Rock	Josh Girard	37 episodes
2007	Late Night With Conan O'Brien	Self	1 episode
2007	The Jeannie Tate Show	Self	1 episode; TV series short
2008	Last Call with Carson Daly	Self	1 episode
2008	Last Comic Standing	Lonny Ross/Talent Scout	1 episode
2008	I Love the New Millennium	Self	2 episodes; TV Mini-Series
2011	Angry Old Man & Gay Teenage Runaway	Randy t'Kettle	7 episodes
2012–2013	Level Up	Max Ross	22 episodes
2013	Arrested Development	Jonah Feinberg	2 episodes
2015	Adam Ruins Everything	Angry Dad	1 episode
2016	Bernie's Wonder Years	Paul Pfeiffer	Television film
2017	Dracula Goes to Camp	Parent in Line #1	Television film
2018	Little Big Awesome	Various voices	9 episodes; TV Series short

=== Video game ===
Year	Title	Role	Notes
2004	Grand Theft Auto: San Andreas	Radio Station Caller	Uncredited
