= Season 4 (30 Rock episode) =

- 30 Rock episode
- Episode no.: Season 4 Episode 1
- Directed by: Don Scardino
- Written by: Tina Fey
- Production code: 401
- Original air date: October 15, 2009

Guest appearances
- Steve Buscemi as Lenny Wosniak; Liz Holtan as Jenna Maroney's intern; Paula Pell as Paula Hornberger

Episode chronology
← Previous "Kidney Now!"	Next → "Into the Crevasse"
- 30 Rock season 4

"Season 4" is the first episode of the fourth season of the American television comedy series 30 Rock, and the 59th episode overall. It was written by the series creator, executive producer and lead actress Tina Fey and directed by series producer Don Scardino. The episode originally aired on NBC in the United States on October 15, 2009. Guest stars in this episode include Steve Buscemi, Liz Holtan, and Paula Pell.

The episode takes place in 2009 as concerns rise over The Girlie Show with Tracy Jordan (TGS), a fictitious sketch comedy series. Jack Donaghy (Alec Baldwin) is worried that the show no longer appeals to mainstream America. He tells Tracy Jordan (Tracy Morgan) to return to his lower-class roots and Jenna Maroney (Jane Krakowski) to become more "country." Meanwhile, Jack tasks Liz Lemon (Fey) with finding a new cast member for TGS. Finally, NBC page Kenneth Parcell (Jack McBrayer) grows angry over Jack's large financial bonus, somewhat similar to the real-world AIG bonus payments controversy.

"Season 4" has received generally positive reviews from television critics. According to the Nielsen ratings system, the episode was watched by 6.312 million households during its original broadcast, and received a 3.0 rating/8 share among viewers in the 18–49 demographic.

== Plot ==
The episode opens with Jack welcoming Liz, Tracy, and Jenna to "Season 4", a fusion cuisine restaurant which serves the best-selling food from the rest of America, "Cheesy Blasters". Jack uses this to "teach ... a lesson" that they have "lost touch with the heartland of consumers." He believes the cast and crew of TGS with Tracy Jordan have become too elitist and need to change to survive in tough economic times. Towards this goal Jack tells Tracy to reconnect with his roots and Jenna suggests that she can "go country".

Despite the plans for Tracy and Jenna, Jack tells Liz—the head writer for TGS—to begin searching for a new cast member to help lessen this elitist image. Liz recruits TGS producer Pete Hornberger (Scott Adsit) to help in her search, planning trips to comedy clubs to find new talent. Both agree to try to keep the process secret from the cast and crew for fear that they would be angered over the idea of a new actor joining the cast. Liz and Pete give awkward answers trying to explain why they are going places together and ultimately tell the TGS writing staff. They also inadvertently tell Josh Girard (Lonny Ross) who, angered by the news, quits the show.

Meanwhile, Kenneth—an NBC page—goes to Jack worried that he cannot honestly sign his timesheet because Kenneth worked many overtime hours but NBC has stopped paying for it to save money. Jack convinces him to sign the sheet, but Kenneth later accidentally receives a large bonus check of Jack's instead of his own paycheck. Kenneth grows angry over the bonus and leads a page strike. The strike grows in size as other trade unions join it, along with Tracy in an attempt to join the common man. Jack hires private detective Lenny Wosniak (Steve Buscemi) to try to end the strike, but he fails. Finally, Jack admits to Kenneth that he is a "big ol' liar" and Kenneth ends the strike (though he nearly reveals to the other pages it was over a personal matter).

== Production ==
"Season 4" was written by series creator, executive producer and lead actress Tina Fey, and directed by series producer Don Scardino. This was Fey's eighteenth writing credit, and Scardino's twenty-second helmed episode. "Season 4" originally aired on NBC in the United States on October 15, 2009, as the season-premiere episode of the show's fourth season and the 59th overall episode of the series. The episode was filmed on August 28, September 1, September 30, and October 9, 2009.

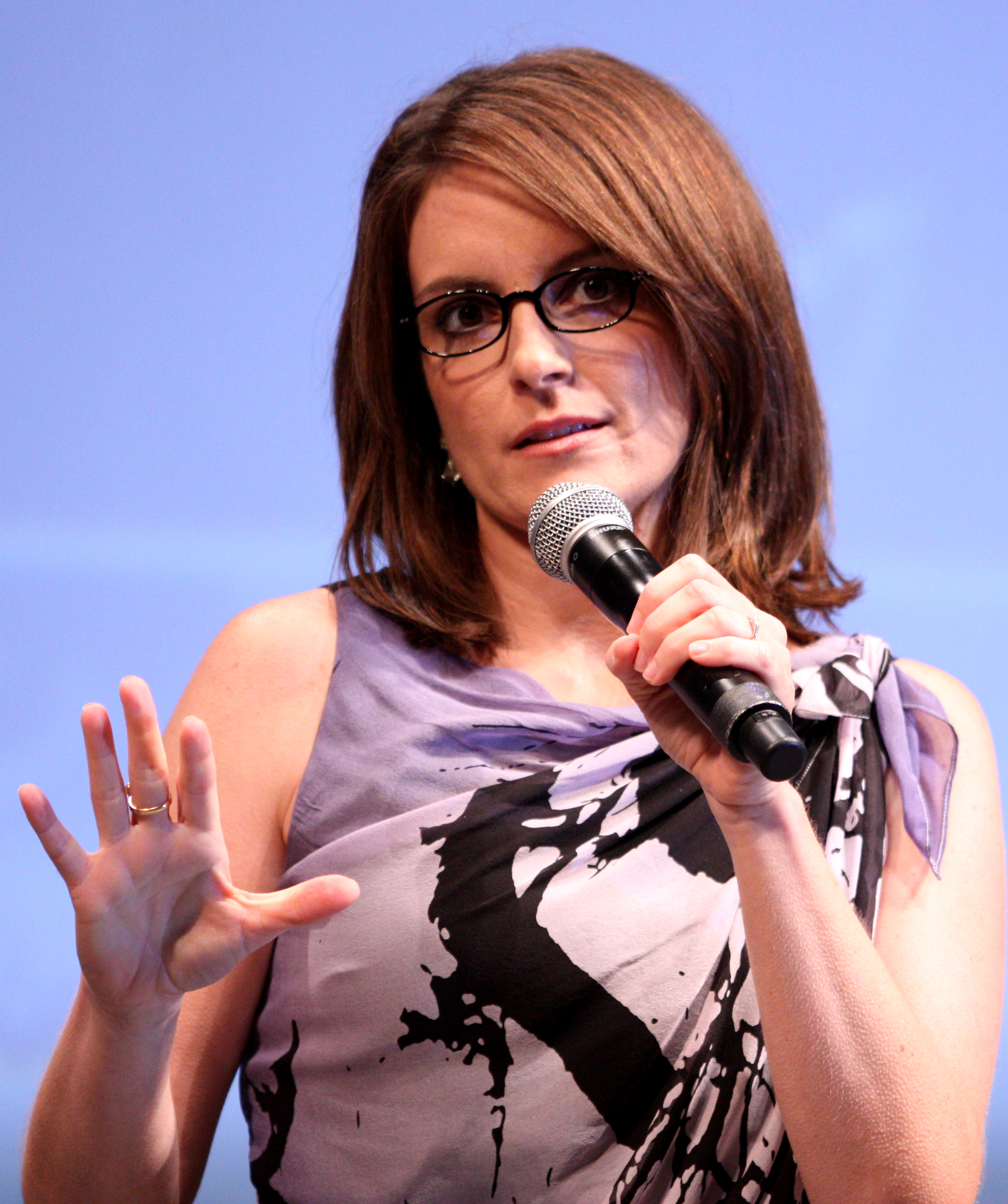
This episode of 30 Rock was written by series creator and lead actress Tina Fey.

Actor Steve Buscemi reprised his role as private investigator Lenny Wosniak for the fourth time, having appeared in "The Collection", "The Natural Order", and "Mamma Mia". Buscemi directed the 30 Rock episode "Retreat to Move Forward" that was broadcast on January 22, 2009, during the show's third season. Paula Pell, a producer and writer on the show, made her third appearance as the character Paula Hornberger, the wife of Pete Hornberger, played by Scott Adsit.

The episode somewhat parodies the AIG bonus payments controversy that occurred in March 2009 when it was publicly disclosed that AIG—an American insurance corporation—was paying approximately $200 million in bonus payments to employees of its financial services division. In the episode, NBC page Kenneth Parcell, along with other pages, wants to be paid for overtime; however, NBC has stopped paying for it to save money. Later, Kenneth receives General Electric executive Jack Donaghy's large bonus check by accident and is angered by this, and as a result, Kenneth rallies all the pages to strike. Despite hiring Lenny to try to end the strike, Jack finally gives in to Kenneth's demand. Television reviewer Maureen Ryan of the Chicago Tribune noted that the strike here was similar to that of the 2007–2008 Writers Guild of America strike.

Part of this episode featured Liz Lemon and Pete going around comedy clubs looking to cast a new individual on TGS after Jack, Liz and Pete's boss, explained that the show's staff have become too elitist and need to change to survive in tough economic times, and that the addition of a new cast member would help lessen this elitist image. The search for a new cast member would continue throughout the season. The scene with Jenna Maroney pulling her intern's (Liz Holtan) earring off, as Jenna believed that her intern wanted to be an actress, was originally meant for the season three episode "Gavin Volure", but was instead featured on 30 Rock's season three DVD as part of the deleted scenes in the Bonus feature.

Two filmed scenes from "Season 4" were cut out from the airing. Instead, the scenes were featured on 30 Rock's season four DVD as part of the deleted scenes in the Bonus feature. In the first scene, in the TGS make-up room, Jenna asks Liz for a ride to Pennsylvania so that she can buy a Confederate Flag that she can wear as a tube top on her appearance on Fox & Friends, however, Liz cannot give her a ride as she is busy. Kenneth stops by and informs Jenna that actress Mischa Barton is on the phone and wants to speak with her. Jenna, however, tells Kenneth to tell Barton that the deal is off as she has decided to go country. In the second scene, Jack and Lenny go through Kenneth's page desk, while Kenneth is participating in the page strike. The two hope to find something that would damage Kenneth's reputation but instead the two come up empty.

== Reception ==
According to the Nielsen ratings system, "Season 4" was watched by 6.312 million households in its original American broadcast, and earned a 3.0 rating/8 share in the 18–49 demographic. This means that it was seen by 3.0 percent of all 18- to 49-year-olds, and 8 percent of all 18- to 49-year-olds watching television at the time of the broadcast. This season premiere episode was down by 2.4 million from the previous season's premiere which had 8.7 million viewers and was at the time the highest-rated episode of the series. Variety and ABC noted that the 2009 Major League Baseball playoffs were a "competitive factor" for ratings on the episode's original air date. 30 Rock's third season, by comparison, did not premiere until October 30, 2008, a day after the 2008 World Series had ended.

IGN contributor Robert Canning reviewed the episode, giving it high marks saying it "proves yet again that 30 Rock is worthy of the Best Comedy Emmy" and scored the episode a 9.2 out of 10. Sean Gandert of Paste magazine also reviewed "Season 4", saying it did "little to disappoint and in fact starts the show off on much stronger footing than the first couple episodes of season 3." Gandert said the episode "doesn't have quite as many truly classic moments as the show's peaks in seasons one and two" but that "it also never really hits a sour note." Bob Sassone of AOL's TV Squad enjoyed the economic crisis, cutbacks, and corporate bonuses theme in the episode, explaining that one of the reasons he loves the show "is because it can take something that's in the news and make it the plot of an episode without it feeling weird or forced." Sassone wrote that despite "Season 4" not being the best episode of 30 Rock "it was still very good." TV Guide's Michael Anthony commented that Steve Buscemi is "so weird and yet does it in such an endearing way." Mary McNamara for the Los Angeles Times called Kenneth's strike one of the more hilarious strikes in history. Entertainment Weekly's Margaret Lyons noted that this episode of 30 Rock had strong moments "and was a solid start to the new season". David Zurawik, a contributor for The Baltimore Sun, liked the episode and enjoyed Buscemi's appearance, noting he "brings just the right mix of sleaze and smiles to the role." The Chicago Sun-Times' Paige Wiser noted, "...tonight's season premiere, the hype is warranted: 30 Rock is in all its glory." Kevin Aeh of Time Out magazine wrote that the best part from "Season 4" was Tracy's storyline after being told to reconnect with his roots.

Not all reviews were positive. David Hinckley of the New York Daily News reported that the season premiere episode "never quite [found] its rhythm." Linda Stasi of the New York Post said that "Season 4" had "some good laughs here, but there's also the threat that 30 Rock could easily turn into that thing the writers relentlessly make fun of – TV shows and stars that are too smug, too smart and too out-of-touch for their own good." The Kansas City Star's Aaron Barnhart deemed it as "one of the weakest 30 Rock's" he has ever seen and that he found the episode boring.

== The Jay Leno Show ==
Lead-out

After The Tonight Show transitioned to new host Conan O'Brien, Jay Leno (the former host) was offered (thanks to beating all other late-night shows in the ratings) his own show at the 10:00 pm slot.

At the same time, 30 Rock was airing this episode, featuring a storyline wherein the NBC network was faltering and had to appeal to the masses (Midwestern Americans). They do this by having Jane Krakowski's character sing and dance ("It's tennis night in America").

For the lead-out to the episode, Alec Baldwin and Tina Fey discuss giving the people "what they want", and then they break the 4th wall by saying "Ladies and gentlemen -- Jay Leno".

Then, as 30 Rock ends, they cut to The Jay Leno Show, where Jay Leno himself breaks the 4th wall by thanking the 30 Rock stars for the lead in and continues with "time to give America what they want". And then the same song plays (with lyrics suited to The Jay Leno Show).
