= Retreat to Move Forward =

- 30 Rock episode
- Episode no.: Season 3 Episode 9
- Directed by: Steve Buscemi
- Written by: Tami Sagher
- Production code: 309
- Original air date: January 22, 2009

Guest appearances
- Shalin Agarwal as Prashant; Cheryl Lynn Bowers as Joan; Mark La Mura as one of the Six Sigmas; Chris Parnell as Dr. Spaceman; Lola Pashalinski as Cleaning lady; Elizabeth Rouse as Katie

Episode chronology
← Previous "Flu Shot"	Next → "Generalissimo"
- 30 Rock season 3

"Retreat to Move Forward" is the ninth episode of the third season of the American television comedy series 30 Rock, and the 45th overall episode of the series. It was written by executive story editor Tami Sagher and directed by Steve Buscemi. The episode originally aired on NBC in the United States on January 22, 2009. Guest stars in this episode include Shalin Agarwal, Cheryl Lynn Bowers, Mark La Mura, Chris Parnell, Lola Pashalinski, and Elizabeth Rouse.

In the episode, Jack Donaghy (Alec Baldwin) invites Liz Lemon (Tina Fey) to a corporate retreat, following his Bush administration and CEO debacles, for moral support. Meanwhile, Jenna Maroney (Jane Krakowski) employs method acting for her Janis Joplin role, which Frank Rossitano (Judah Friedlander) quickly takes advantage of. After Tracy Jordan (Tracy Morgan) is diagnosed with diabetes, Kenneth Parcell (Jack McBrayer) attempts to find a way to dissuade Tracy from eating sugary food.

"Retreat to Move Forward" was generally well received among television critics. According to the Nielsen Media Research, the episode was watched by 6.4 million households during its original broadcast, and received a 3.2 rating/8 share among viewers in the 18–49 demographic.

== Plot ==
Jack Donaghy (Alec Baldwin) asks Liz Lemon (Tina Fey) to accompany him to the Six Sigmas Retreat in Croton-on-Hudson, New York, following his Bush administration and CEO debacles. There, Jack meets with the Six Sigmas, six men who each embody a core feature of Six Sigma: teamwork, insight, brutality, male enhancement, hand-shake-fulness and play-hard. They disapprove of Liz's antics during the team building exercises and demand that Jack distance himself from her if he wants to succeed, which he does. Before his dinner speech, Jack psyches himself up in the men's room, completely forgetting that he is wearing a microphone and that everyone can hear him. Liz quickly takes the stage to draw attention away from Jack's embarrassment and finally ends up ripping her blouse open and dancing in front of everyone. She succeeds, and is banned from the retreat forever.

Meanwhile, Jenna Maroney (Jane Krakowski) employs method acting for her upcoming role as singer Janis Joplin, thus allowing Frank Rossitano (Judah Friedlander) to take advantage of her. He tells her to do her research on Joplin on Wikipedia, then edits the page contents with nonsense when Jenna goes off to read it. Jenna, however, believes what she reads and proceeds to imitate all the "facts" on the page to the amusement of everyone. When she finally confronts Frank, they end up having sex and Jenna is affronted when Frank wants to keep it a secret from their co-workers. She reveals their fling in front of the other TGS with Tracy Jordan writers to the dismay of Frank. At hearing this, Katie (Elizabeth Rouse), the show's hair dresser and Frank's girlfriend, ruins Jenna's hair and face making her look like a witch.

At the same time, NBC page Kenneth Parcell (Jack McBrayer) tries to help Tracy Jordan (Tracy Morgan) understand how diabetes affects him after Dr. Leo Spaceman (Chris Parnell) told Tracy that he is at risk of getting diabetes. Kenneth tells him a story of how a wicked witch will come and take him away if he continues to consume his unhealthy eating habits but Tracy does not believe him. Tracy gets disgusted when Kenneth tries to scare him by dressing as a witch but suddenly Jenna comes running in screaming and looking like a witch complete with a broomstick in hand. This scares both Kenneth and Tracy who fearfully vows to change his eating habits immediately.

== Production ==
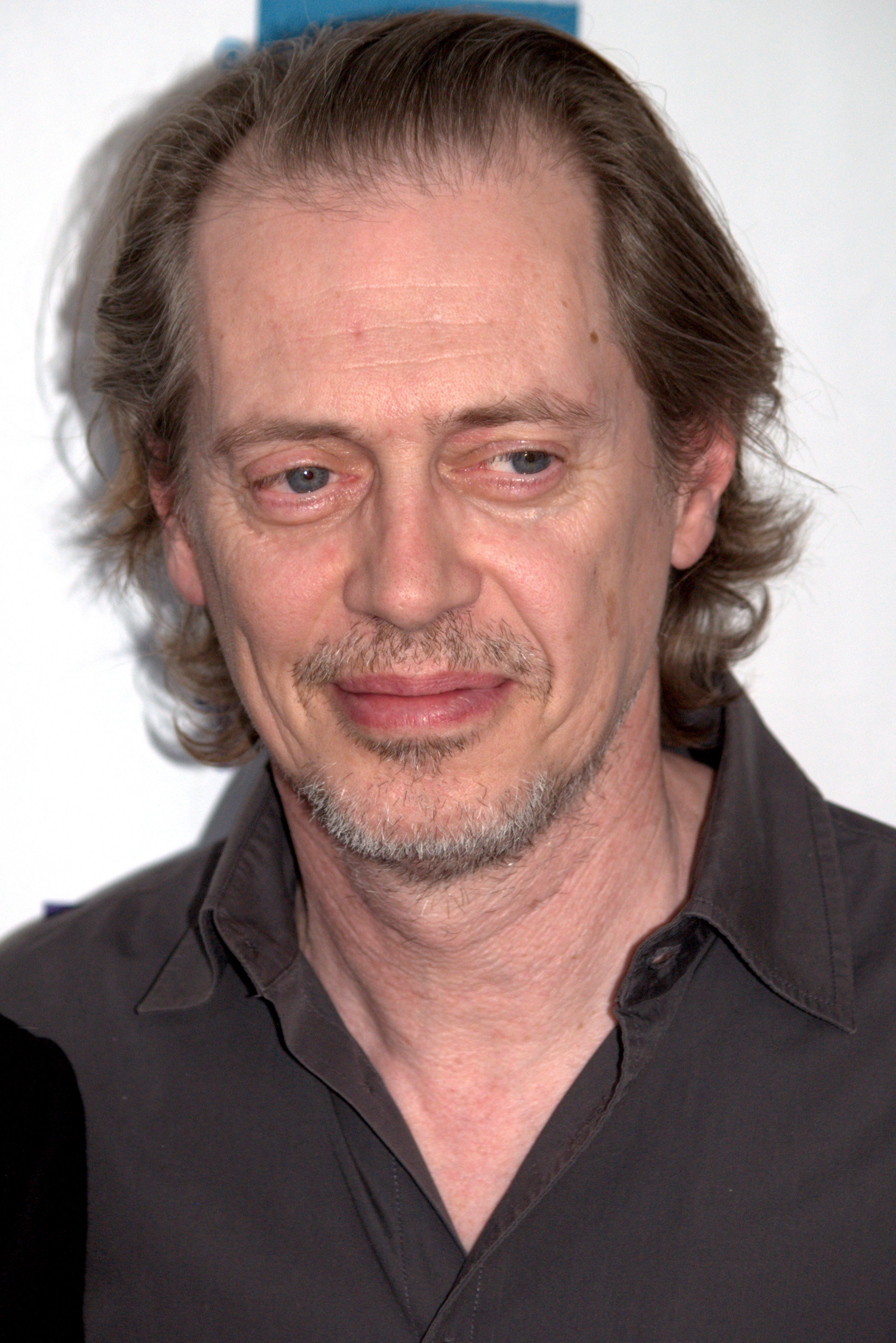
"Retreat to Move Forward" was directed by Steve Buscemi

"Retreat to Move Forward" was written by executive story editor Tami Sagher and directed by Steve Buscemi. This was Sagher's second writing credit, having written season two episode "Ludachristmas" that aired on December 13, 2007. This was Buscemi's first directed episode. "Retreat to Move Forward" originally aired on January 22, 2009, on NBC in the United States as the ninth episode of the show's third season and the 45th overall episode of the series.

Buscemi has appeared on the show as the character Lenny Wosniak, a private investigator who has been hired by Jack Donaghy in the episodes "The Collection", "The Natural Order", "Mamma Mia", and "Season 4". Actor Chris Parnell reprised his role as Dr. Leo Spaceman in this episode. This was Parnell's ninth appearance on the show.

== Cultural references ==
At the beginning of this 30 Rock episode, Liz tells Jack that she and Jenna used to perform improvisation at corporate retreats. In a flashback, the audience shout out Sling Blade and Oprah as suggestions for Liz and Jenna to do. Liz does the impression of the Sling Blade character, but Jenna believed that Liz was Oprah. Tracy becomes intrigued with the idea of having his foot replaced with a wheel, after Dr. Spaceman informs him that if diabetes is left untreated he could lose a foot, to which he asks Dr. Spaceman "Could I replace it with a wheel like Rosie from The Jetsons?" Rosie is the humanoid robot maid for the title family, and she rolls about on a set of caster wheels. When the TGS writers learn from Jenna that she will be employing method acting, Frank suggests that she do her research of Janis Joplin on Wikipedia, the free online encyclopedia. When Frank sees Jenna getting ready to eat a cat, he stops her and tells her that ALF, an extraterrestrial, eats cats. After admitting that she hooked up with Frank, Jenna reveals that Dog the Bounty Hunter is the second grossest guy she has ever been with.

Later in the episode, to cover-up for Jack, after psyching himself up and completely forgetting that he was wearing a microphone and that everyone could hear him, Liz starts singing the song "Gonna Make You Sweat (Everybody Dance Now)" by dance music group C+C Music Factory. "Retreat to Move Forward" references Jack's time in the Bush administration that occurred in the show's second season, and Jack's unsuccessful attempts of becoming CEO of General Electric in the December 4, 2008, episode "Reunion", after Don Geiss (Rip Torn)—who woke up from his diabetic coma—informs him he wants to remain as CEO of the company. This was the second time 30 Rock referenced Jenna trying to play singer Janis Joplin in a feature film. This plot first began in the episode, "Señor Macho Solo", in which Jenna auditions to play the singer in a biographical movie.

== Reception ==
In its original American broadcast, "Retreat to Move Forward" was watched by 6.4 million households, according to the Nielsen Media Research. This episode earned a 3.2 rating/8 share in the 18 and 49 demographic, meaning that 3.2 percent of all people in that group, and 8 percent of all people from that group watching television at the time, watched the episode. This was a decrease from the previous episode, "Flu Shot", which was watched by 6.6 million American viewers.

Television columnist Alan Sepinwall of The Star-Ledger felt that "Retreat to Move Forward" was one of the best episodes of an uneven season. Sepinwall, however, felt it "petered out" towards the end, and that the Tracy and Kenneth plot did not work until it met the Jenna and Frank story. He noted that without the addition of a guest star, "this one made good use of virtually the entire cast". IGN contributor Robert Canning enjoyed Liz and Jack's relationship in the episode. Canning felt that while the show occasionally hints at a romantic relationship between the two, they should never become linked. In his opinion, the episode demonstrated their non-romantic friendship "perfectly". Bob Sassone of AOL's TV Squad liked the episode, but noted "...it's the second week in a row where one of the plots was way too over the top for me." Sassone wrote that he was not thrilled with the Kenneth and Tracy plot, citing that it was "way too silly and loud". TV Guide's Matt Mitovich said that "Retreat to Move Forward" was "[a]nother very funny, super-huge-guest-star-free episode". Rick Porter of Zap2it reported that he found himself "more attracted" to the second-tier plots than to the Jack and Liz plot, observing that it "had its moments, but the overall story didn't hit too many new notes in their relationship. [...] So yeah, some funny bits here and there with the main story ... But we've seen this kind of dynamic between Liz and Jack before, and so it didn't have the same comedic force as in the past." Kevin D. Thompson for The Palm Beach Post praised 30 Rock for doing a perfect job with its three plots in the episode, and said that Jenna's line, "The academy loves dead singers and the handicapped. And Janis was both!", was "[h]ands-down, the funniest line of the show."

The A.V. Club's Nathan Rabin, who had been favorable to Jenna's story arc of her playing Joplin, was not impressed with her antics in this episode. In regards to the episode itself, Rabin opined, "Tonight's episode was consistently amusing but 30 Rock engenders such sky-high expectations that being good oftentimes just isn't good enough." In conclusion, he gave the episode a B grade rating. "'Retreat to Move Forward' had some amusing moments, but it's a bit unmemorable in retrospect. I'm still waiting for a true classic 30 Rock episode this season", said Jeremy Medina for Paste magazine. Nonetheless, Medina preferred this episode over The Office's "Prince Family Paper", in which its plot focused on whether actress Hilary Swank was attractive or not.
