= Into the Crevasse =

- 30 Rock episode
- Episode no.: Season 4 Episode 2
- Directed by: Beth McCarthy-Miller
- Written by: Robert Carlock
- Production code: 402
- Original air date: October 22, 2009

Guest appearances
- Will Arnett as Devon Banks; Caitlin Fowler as Porn Jenna Maroney; Shawn Gianella as Porn Jack Donaghy; Jon Glaser as Mike; Savanna Samson as Porn Liz Lemon

Episode chronology
← Previous "Season 4"	Next → "Stone Mountain"
- 30 Rock season 4

"Into the Crevasse" is the second episode of the fourth season of the American television comedy series 30 Rock, and the 60th overall episode of the series. The episode was written by co-showrunner and executive producer Robert Carlock and directed by Beth McCarthy-Miller. It originally aired on NBC in the United States on October 22, 2009. Guest stars in "Into the Crevasse" include Will Arnett, Caitlin Fowler, Shawn Gianella, Jon Glaser, and Savanna Samson.

The episode largely revolves around repercussions from a sketch "Dealbreakers" that Liz Lemon (Tina Fey) had written for the fictional sketch comedy show The Girlie Show with Tracy Jordan (TGS). Meanwhile, Jack Donaghy (Alec Baldwin) travels to Washington D.C. for a hearing on microwaves and Kenneth Parcell (Jack McBrayer) volunteers at an animal shelter.

"Into the Crevasse" received generally positive reception from television critics. According to the Nielsen ratings system, it was watched by 6.684 million households during its original broadcast, and received a 3.2 rating/8 share among viewers in the 18–49 demographic. For his performance in this episode, Will Arnett received a Primetime Emmy Award nomination in the category for Outstanding Guest Actor in a Comedy Series.

== Plot ==
=== Background ===
Liz had written a comedy sketch titled "Dealbreakers" in the episode "Mamma Mia." In "Dealbreakers" Jenna Maroney (Jane Krakowski) doled out comic catchphrases as relationship advice to other women such as "If he wears an Atlanta Falcons jersey to your sister's wedding? That's a Deal Breaker, ladies!" Liz tried to gain attention for writing the sketch, including being in a photoshoot for Time Out magazine with Jenna and ultimately on the cover alone and a talk show appearance in the episode "Kidney Now!" where she dispensed more "Dealbreaker"-style romantic advice. Liz continued to give similar advice to women she knew, such as the wives of Tracy Jordan (Tracy Morgan) and Pete Hornberger (Scott Adsit), but both men grow angry with her for their spouses' subsequent anger with them both. At the end of "Kidney Now!" Liz tells Jack she has signed a book deal on the sketch.

=== "Into the Crevasse" ===
This episode opens with Liz seeing her books and a cardboard cutout of herself in a bookstore window. She shows Mike (Jon Glaser), a nametag-wearing employee that she is the author but he grows angry with her, showing a quote from her book "If your man is over thirty and still wears a nametag to work, that's a dealbreaker," and he tears apart her cutout. Several other men in Liz's life including Frank Rossitano (Judah Friedlander), J.D. Lutz (John Lutz), Pete, Tracy, and the janitor yell at her for providing advice which they believed damaged their relationships. Tracy's wife Angie (Sherri Shepherd) kicked him out of their home and he moves in with Liz as punishment for damaging his marriage. Once there he reads Liz's Dealbreakers book in detail and discovers that much of the book was written directly about him (calling his various oddities "deal breakers"). Also Jenna, angry with Liz over the search for a new cast member which started in the previous episode, travels to Iceland to film a low-budget werewolf movie.

Meanwhile, Jack, who serves as Vice President of East Coast Television and Microwave Oven Programming for General Electric (GE), travels to Washington, D.C., to participate in a task force on microwaves as the industry is struggling, but he says he refuses to take any bailout money. He believes the meeting will be quite simple and quick, but once there he is confronted by Devon Banks (Will Arnett) who has begun working with the federal government. Devon reveals that he has spent the last year since being fired from GE in "Do-Over" working to get back at Jack by making connections in the Barack Obama administration through a friendship with the president's daughters, Sasha and Malia. Devon leaks Jack's controversial testimony from the hearing, believing that public pressure will force Jack to resign in three days. Jack spends that time asking the TGS with Tracy Jordan staff writers—Frank, Lutz, and James "Toofer" Spurlock (Keith Powell)—to come up with an idea "as good as the light bulb" to improve the microwave. Basing their ideas off the American auto industry, they try to incorporate suggestions such as making the microwave bigger or making them break down more often so they require replacement, but Jack eventually abandons the project as a failure when the result is simply a car.

Kenneth takes some time off from his page duties to volunteer at an animal shelter. He claims his time on a pig farm will allow him to not emotionally connect with the dogs being held there, but he quickly names all of the dogs and adopts the many dogs scheduled to be euthanized that day. Kenneth asks for someone at TGS to adopt the dogs and Tracy quickly brings them all to Liz's apartment to continue annoying her. Liz and Tracy go to Jack to finally resolve their conflict. Jack decides that, because Liz ruined Tracy's life with her book, Tracy should be given the right to ruin her life, and he orders Liz to sign over her life rights to Tracy. Jack tells Liz a story about an accident he had ice climbing, falling into a crevasse. He broke his leg and was unable to climb upwards to escape, but by going deeper down into the crevasse he found a path out. Jack draws a parallel to his situation with Devon and realizes a solution - he accepts government bailout money (which he had previously refused), effectively making Devon Jack's boss. Liz also applies this story to her situation with Tracy and stops resisting him, instead suggesting that Tracy make a pornographic film based on her life. Tracy agrees and moves out of Liz's apartment. In addition, Jenna and Liz resolve their issues when they see two adult stars acting out a scene of Jenna (Caitlin Fowler) and Liz (Savanna Samson) apologizing to one another. Tracy shuts down production when filming gets too distasteful for him.

== Production ==
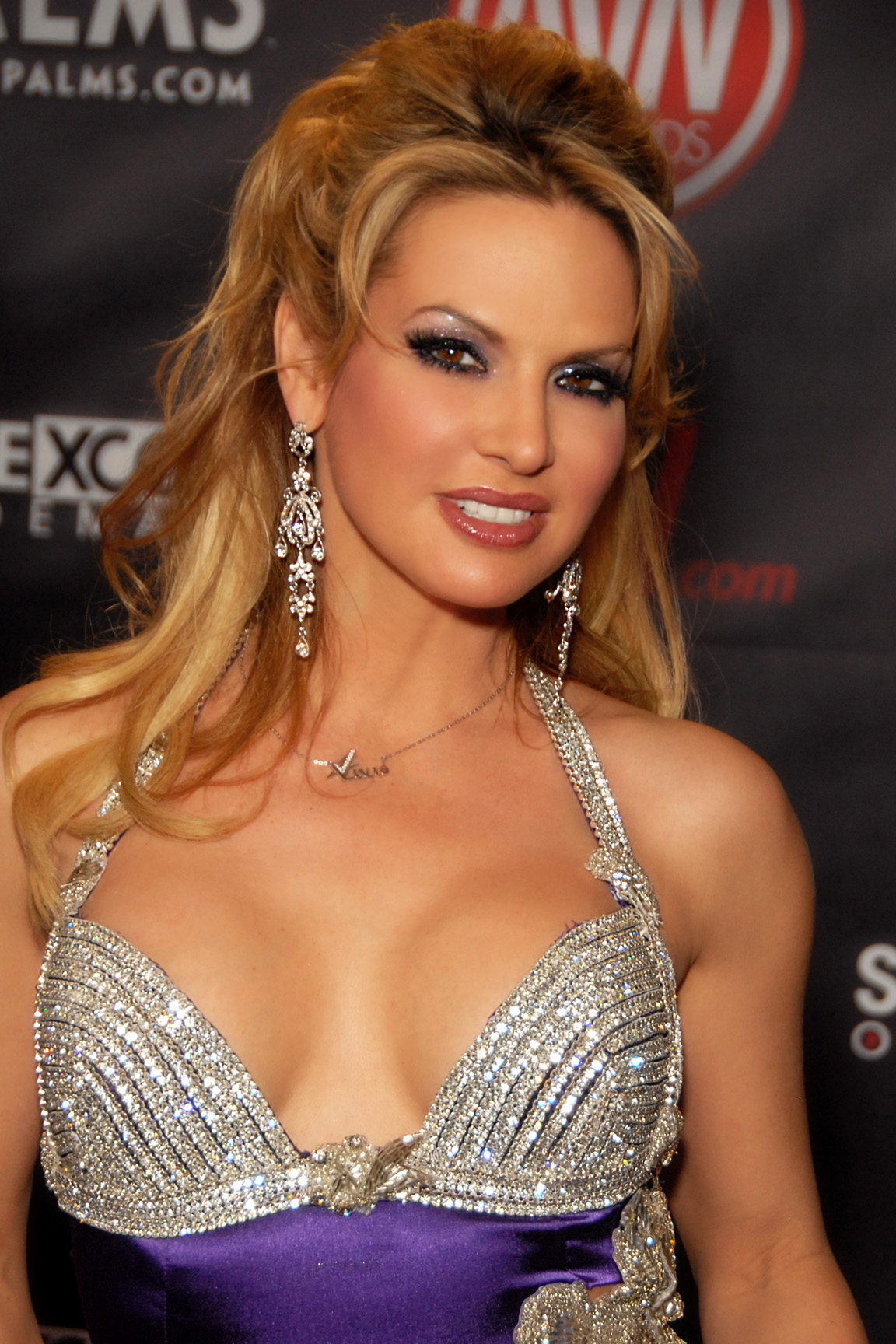
Savanna Samson guest starred as the porn version of Liz Lemon in this episode.

"Into the Crevasse" was written by co-showrunner and executive producer Robert Carlock and directed by Beth McCarthy-Miller, a long-time television director who worked with 30 Rock creator Tina Fey on the sketch comedy show Saturday Night Live. "Into the Crevasse" originally aired in the United States on October 22, 2009, on NBC as the second episode of the show's fourth season and the 60th overall episode of the series.

Comedic actor Will Arnett made his fifth appearance as Devon Banks on 30 Rock, after appearing on "Fireworks", "Jack Gets in the Game", "Succession", and "Do-Over". Jon Glaser, a comedy actor, guest starred as Mike, a nametag-wearing employee who grows angry with Liz Lemon after showing her a quote from her book. Caitlin Fowler and Shawn Gianella appeared in "Into the Crevasse" as porn versions of Jenna Maroney and Jack Donaghy, respectively, while adult film actress Savanna Samson played the porn version of Liz, as part of Tracy Jordan owning Liz's life rights. At the end of the episode, Gianella and Samson recreate an earlier scene in which Jack gives Liz her retainer, though, upon receiving the retainer, Samson asks Gianella "How will I ever thank you?" prompting Tracy to stop production. This whole scene is a reference to a pornographic parody of 30 Rock released earlier the same year. Despite rumors to the contrary, the actors playing 'porn versions' of 30 Rock characters were not the same performers featured on the original parody.

Carlock was asked in a 2009 interview if the TGS writers were going to be seen more in the upcoming season, to which he replied, "One of the great things about this show and the blessing and the curse is that we have so many characters and so many different interactions between characters that work so well. [...] And so, yeah, absolutely because we love those guys". In "Into the Crevasse", Frank, Toofer, and Lutz help Jack come up with ideas on how to improve microwaves.

Part of this episode featured Jenna shooting a movie in Iceland as a retaliation to Liz, whom Jenna believes is behind the idea of adding a new cast member on TGS, a show Jenna stars in and Liz is the head writer for, though it was Jack's idea to cast a new actor. In "Season 4", the season premiere episode, Jack explains that the show's staff have become too elitist and need to change to survive in tough economic times, and informs Liz to begin searching for a new cast member to help lessen this elitist image. Jenna is not happy with this decision as she believes that her position on the show will be lessened with the arrival of a new actor. The search for a new cast member would continue throughout the season.

== Cultural references ==
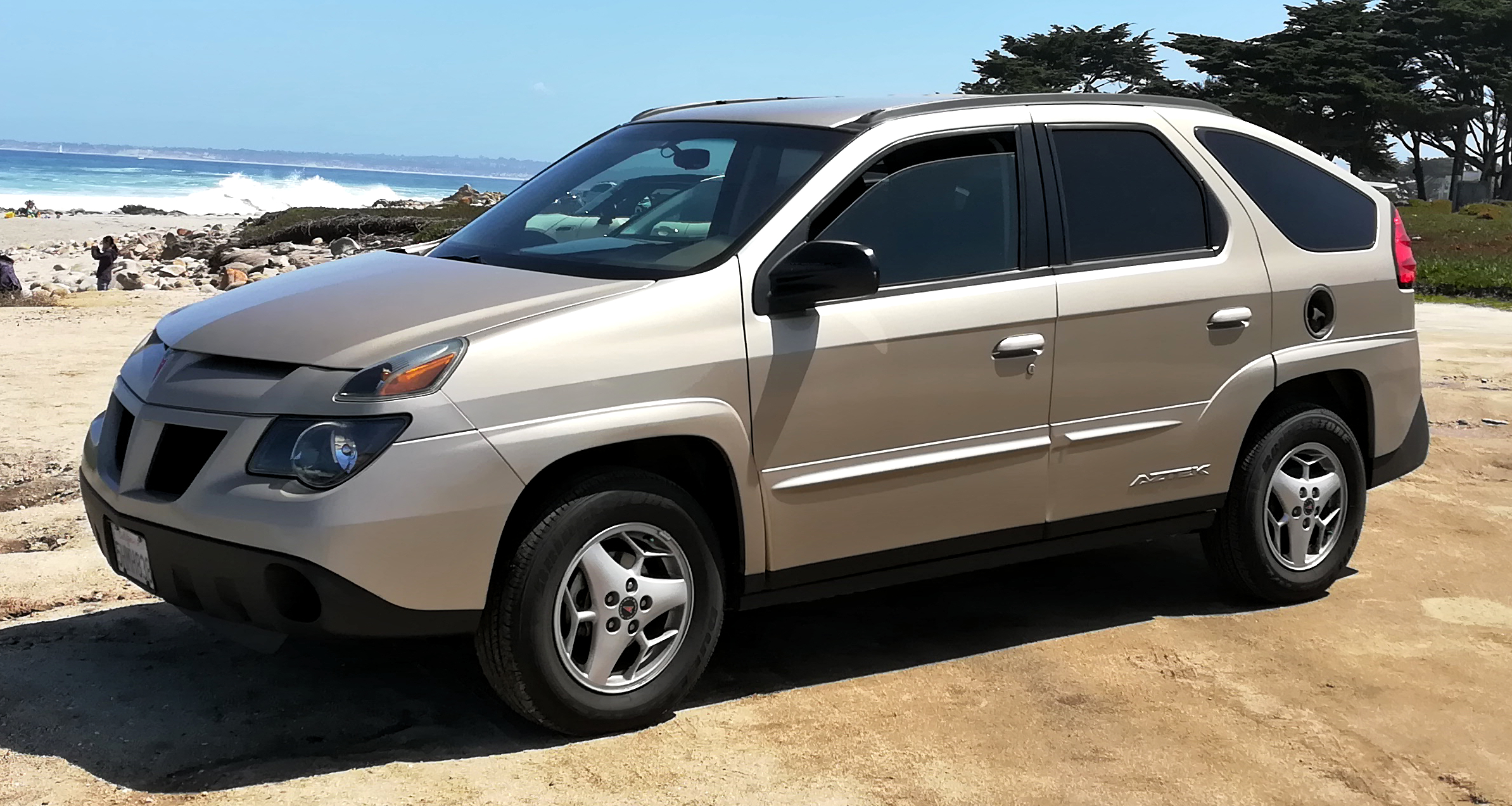
In redesigning a microwave Jack, Frank, and Toofer accidentally create a car that resembles the Pontiac Aztek.

The episode makes several references to the 2008–2010 automotive industry crisis and the 2008 financial crisis. When Liz asks why Jack is taking a bus to Washington he replies "ever since these buffoons from Detroit took private planes the rest of us have to put on a show," a reference to controversial travel methods by several CEOs en route to a November 19 congressional hearing. The dilemma over bailout money also bears resemblance to federal bailouts of General Motors and Chrysler. In describing how he plans to destroy Jack's image, Devon says "by the time I'm done you're going to make AIG look like the Lehman Brothers of microwaves," a reference to two notable corporations affected by the 2008 financial crisis. Devon also says that in his search for an organization more powerful than GE he selected the American government because, "American Idol's not on until January."

In their attempt to design a new microwave Jack, Frank, and Toofer change features on the microwave such as adding four doors and putting wheels on it until Jack stops the project saying they had "invented the Pontiac Aztek." While living in Liz's apartment Tracy orders several adult films on pay-per-view including The Curious Case of Benjamin Butt and I'm-A-Do-Us, puns on the films The Curious Case of Benjamin Button (2008) and Amadeus (1984). The story Jack tells Liz about the time he fell down into a crevasse and had to climb down into the darkness is inspired by the 1988 book Touching the Void. In a discussion with Jenna about werewolves, Liz mentions "Thriller", a music video by recording artist Michael Jackson.

== Reception ==
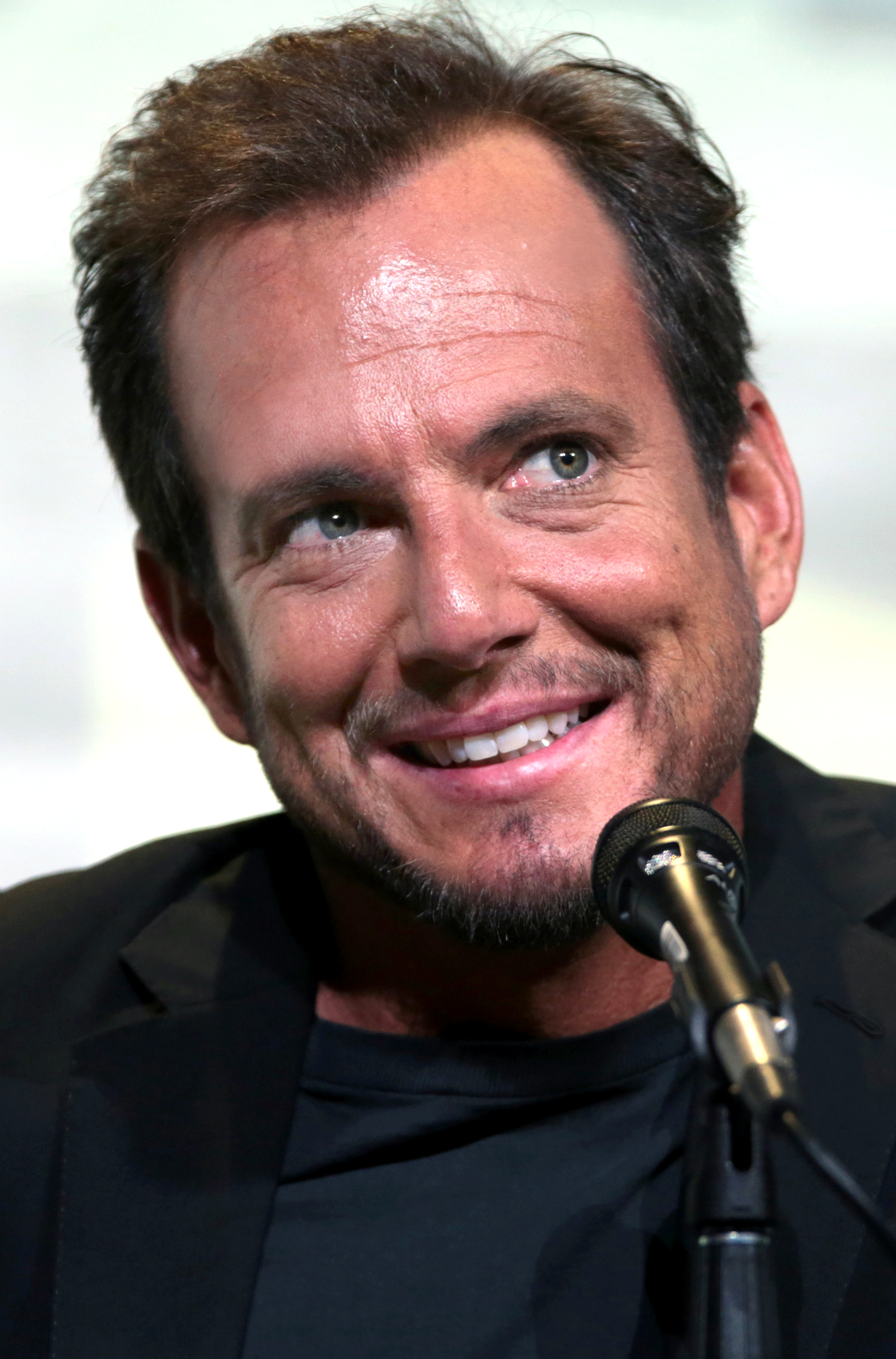
Will Arnett received a nomination for the Primetime Emmy Award for Outstanding Guest Actor in a Comedy Series for his performance in this episode.

According to the Nielsen ratings system, "Into the Crevasse" was watched by 6.684 million households in its original American broadcast. It was a slight increase from the season premiere episode, "Season 4", which was seen by 6.312 million American viewers. The show claimed a 3.2 rating/8 share in the 18–49 demographic, meaning that it was seen by 3.2 percent of all 18- to 49-year-olds, and 8 percent of all 18- to 49-year-olds watching television at the time of the broadcast. Will Arnett received a Primetime Emmy Award nomination for Outstanding Guest Actor in a Comedy Series at the 62nd Primetime Emmy Awards for his performance in this episode, but lost it to actor Neil Patrick Harris for his guest appearance on Glee.

Robert Canning of IGN reviewed the episode, simply saying he "loved this episode," giving it a perfect 10 out of 10 score. Canning enjoyed Jack and Devon's back-and-forth, and wrote that Jenna and Tracy "tormenting" Liz in their separate ways were "equally gratifying." Meredith Blake, a contributor from the Los Angeles Times opined, "To all those haters who say 30 Rock is losing its touch, I say 'poppycock!' ['Into the Crevasse'] was proof that the show is as zippy as ever." She noted that Jack's plot "didn't make a whole lot of sense", nonetheless "anything that means more Will Arnett on 30 Rock is fine by me." Bob Sassone of AOL's TV Squad reported it was great to see Jack and NBC "still being affected by the economy, government bailouts, and Washington hearings". Sassone much preferred "Into the Crevasse" than "Season 4". New York magazine contributor Mark Graham said this episode of 30 Rock saw the series "once again hitting a familiar, meta-flavored stride, as Tina Fey and her writing staff tried a 'ripped from the headlines' approach and took on recent real-life story lines like the 30 Rock porno". "The return of Will Arnett, the existence of a Porn Liz, and one deal breaker after another: 'Into the Crevasse' had some killer lines, even if it didn't come together in one big narrative", remarked Margaret Lyons of Entertainment Weekly. In his recap, TV Guide's Michael Anthony said that the Jack and Devon characters "really [knew] how to put a playful spin" on the bail out and government money story.

Kevin Aeh of Time Out Chicago said the episode "had some great lines" but overall it "was a little all over the place and, as a whole, not super hilarious." Sean Gandert of Paste magazine also reviewed "Into the Crevasse," saying it "makes for an adequate, though not spectacular, episode" and that he was disappointed because he felt 30 Rock was beginning to "coast" as a series. Television columnist Alan Sepinwall from The Star-Ledger was not impressed with Jenna's trip to Iceland, commenting that the show needs to find something new to do with the character or have her quit TGS. Sepinwall wrote that the writing staff have done "better iterations" of Tracy being mad at Liz story angles. The A.V. Club's Nathan Rabin disliked "Into the Crevasse", noting that it fell short for its "tired storylines, an over-reliance on familiar faces to prop up weak gags and characters that are rapidly devolving into glib caricatures of themselves."
