= Kidney Now! =

- 30 Rock episode
- Episode no.: Season 3 Episode 22
- Directed by: Don Scardino
- Written by: Jack Burditt; Robert Carlock
- Production code: 322
- Original air date: May 14, 2009

Guest appearances
- Alan Alda as Milton Greene; Kay Cannon as a lady who asks a question on The Vontella Show; Donald Glover as high-schooler outed by Tracy; Napiera Groves as Vontella; Chris Parnell as Dr. Leo Spaceman; Paula Pell as Paula Hornberger; Sherri Shepherd as Angie Jordan; As themselves: Clay Aiken; Sara Bareilles; Beastie Boys (Mike D and Ad-Rock); Mary J. Blige; Elvis Costello; Sheryl Crow; Steve Earle; Wyclef Jean; Norah Jones; Talib Kweli; Cyndi Lauper; Adam Levine; Michael McDonald; Rhett Miller; Moby; Robert Randolph; Rachael Yamagata

Episode chronology
← Previous "Mamma Mia"	Next → "Season 4"
- 30 Rock season 3

"Kidney Now!" is the twenty-second episode and season finale of the third season of the American television comedy series 30 Rock, and the 58th overall episode of the series. It was directed by series producer Don Scardino, and written by show producers Jack Burditt and Robert Carlock. The episode originally aired on NBC in the United States on May 14, 2009. Guest stars in this episode include Alan Alda, Kay Cannon, Donald Glover, Napiera Groves, Chris Parnell, Paula Pell, and Sherri Shepherd. In addition, "Kidney Now!" featured many musical guest stars including Clay Aiken, Elvis Costello, Mary J. Blige, Sheryl Crow, the Beastie Boys (Mike D and Ad Rock), Steve Earle, Adam Levine, Sara Bareilles, Wyclef Jean, Norah Jones, Talib Kweli, Michael McDonald, Rhett Miller, Moby, Robert Randolph, Rachael Yamagata and Cyndi Lauper, all as themselves.

In the episode, Jack Donaghy (Alec Baldwin) gets to know his newly discovered father, Milton Greene (Alda), but quickly learns that Milton needs a kidney transplant, and discovers he is not a suitable donor. As a result, Jack decides to use the liberal media to find an alternate way to get him a kidney donor. Meanwhile, people seek Liz Lemon (Tina Fey) out as a relationship expert as a result of her "Dealbreaker" sketches, and Kenneth Parcell (Jack McBrayer) helps Tracy Jordan (Tracy Morgan) deal with his embarrassment over not finishing high school.

The song "He Needs a Kidney" was written by show composer and co-executive producer Jeff Richmond. The concept of doing a charity concert was based on Robert Carlock and series creator Tina Fey wanting to include a musical performance in the episode with the Milton Greene character in need of a kidney donor. Carlock and Fey wanted "He Needs a Kidney" to be similar to the 1985 charity song, "We Are the World". Following the airing of this 30 Rock episode, NBC released the musical performance video of "He Needs a Kidney" on iTunes with all proceeds from the sales going to the National Kidney Foundation.

"Kidney Now!" was generally well received among television critics. According to the Nielsen Media Research, this episode was watched by 5.7 million viewers. Jack Burditt and Robert Carlock were nominated for a Primetime Emmy Award nomination in the category for Outstanding Writing in a Comedy Series for their work in this episode. In addition, Tony Pipitone and Griffin Richardson received a Creative Arts Emmy Award nomination in the category for Outstanding Sound Mixing for a Comedy or Drama Series (half-hour) and Animation.

== Plot ==
Jack Donaghy (Alec Baldwin) gets to know his newly discovered father, Milton Greene (Alan Alda) but soon discovers Milton has a serious medical condition and is in search of a kidney donor. After discovering he is an unsuitable donor by Dr. Leo Spaceman (Chris Parnell), Jack uses his contacts—musicians Clay Aiken, Sara Bareilles, the Beastie Boys (Mike D and Ad-Rock), Mary J. Blige, Elvis Costello, Sheryl Crow, Steve Earle, Wyclef Jean, Norah Jones, Talib Kweli, Cyndi Lauper, Adam Levine, Michael McDonald, Rhett Miller, Moby, Robert Randolph, and Rachael Yamagata—to arrange a charity benefit entitled "Kidney Now!" in attempt to find a donor for Milton.

Meanwhile, Liz Lemon (Tina Fey) gains notoriety after making an appearance on The Vontella Show, along with Jenna Maroney (Jane Krakowski), as a relationship expert after her "Dealbreaker" sketches on the fictitious comedy sketch show The Girlie Show with Tracy Jordan (TGS). As a result of the success she received as the relationship expert on The Vontella Show, Liz becomes more well known and begins dispensing relationship advice to the female staff of TGS, and to Angie Jordan (Sherri Shepherd) and Paula Hornberger (Paula Pell), the wives of TGS star Tracy Jordan (Tracy Morgan) and producer Pete Hornberger (Scott Adsit), respectively. Though, Tracy and Pete are upset with the advice Liz gave to their wives, Liz blows them off and goes to Quizno's to meet with an agent to write a prospective Dealbreaker book. The deal goes through and Liz tells Jack that she is "getting [hers]."

At the same time, Tracy is invited to speak at the graduation ceremony of his former high school (named after Frank Lucas, the infamous Harlem drug lord). NBC page and friend Kenneth Parcell (Jack McBrayer) tries to help him overcome troubling memories from his high school experience. Kenneth persuades Tracy to go to the graduation, which he does, where Tracy gives his speech and receives an honorary diploma.

== Production ==
"Kidney Now!" was directed by series producer Don Scardino, and written by 30 Rock producers Jack Burditt and Robert Carlock. This was Burditt and Carlock's fourth script collaboration, having penned the episodes "Cleveland", "Subway Hero", and "Sandwich Day". This was Scardino's twenty-first directed episode. "Kidney Now!" originally aired on NBC in the United States on May 14, 2009, as the twenty-second episode and season finale of the show's third season and the 58th overall episode of the series.

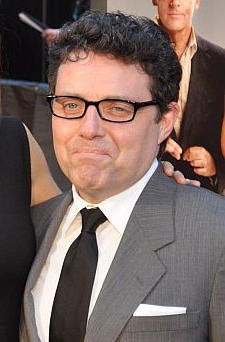
"He Needs a Kidney" was written and arranged by 30 Rock composer Jeff Richmond (pictured).

"Kidney Now!" was first read by its cast on March 5, 2009; it was filmed on March 16–17, 2009. "He Needs a Kidney", the charity song featured in this episode, was written by show composer and co-executive producer Jeff Richmond. Richmond is married to series creator, executive producer and lead actress Tina Fey. In discussion of the development of "Kidney Now!", Richmond said that Carlock and Fey "were trying to figure out a way to highlight Jack's dad in getting a kidney and how they're going to deal with that", and that the two came to the decision to "take advantage of the singing", as they have done so in the past with different 30 Rock episodes, in which the show's characters have sung songs. Carlock and Fey agreed to the idea that a song be included in the season finale, but that it be an anthem like the 1985 charity song, "We Are the World", as the cause is that the Milton Greene character is in need of a kidney donor. "Basically, the parameters were if 'We Are the World' but they want to get a kidney. I think we had angles that everyone has two kidneys and you'll only need one kidney, and we thought 'Alright, we'll get some distance on that'", said Richmond. While working on the track, Fey suggested to Richmond that he incorporate Milton Greene's name in one part of the song, which he did, as this was sung by singers Cyndi Lauper and Robert Randolph.

Giancarlo Vulcano, a music editor and associate arranger on the show, revealed that Richmond taught him the song one morning at Silvercup Studios—where the show is filmed—and they played the first half of "He Needs a Kidney" at the script's read-through. According to Vulcano, the 30 Rock staff loved the song and the two were satisfied with the reception of it. While arranging the instrumentation, Richmond hired violinists for the episode's background music and for "He Needs a Kidney", which according to him he usually does not get the opportunity to have a lot of violin sounds on the show. The recording sessions with the musical guests took place on Stage 1 at Silvercup Studios; Stage 1 serves as the set for TGS with Tracy Jordan, a fictitious comedy sketch show featured on 30 Rock. Richmond and Vulcano were complimentary towards the musicians—Clay Aiken, Sara Bareilles, the Beastie Boys (Mike D and Ad-Rock), Mary J. Blige, Elvis Costello, Sheryl Crow, Steve Earle, Wyclef Jean, Norah Jones, Talib Kweli, Cyndi Lauper, Adam Levine, Michael McDonald, Rhett Miller, Moby, Robert Randolph, and Rachael Yamagata—who performed "He Needs a Kidney". In the DVD commentary for this episode, Richmond believed that the entire song would not make it into the airing. Elvis Costello was once approached to do an appearance on 30 Rock, but the appearance fell-through. At an Oscar's after party, Fey ran into Costello and asked him if he could appear, which he agreed to. According to Fey, none of the music artists got paid to appear on the show as "they all did [it] for free." The reason for this was due to a joke in the song in which Sheryl Crow was the only individual to get paid, as the rest said they did it for free. Following the broadcast of this episode of 30 Rock, the musical performance video was made available for digital download on iTunes with all the proceeds from the sales going to the National Kidney Foundation.

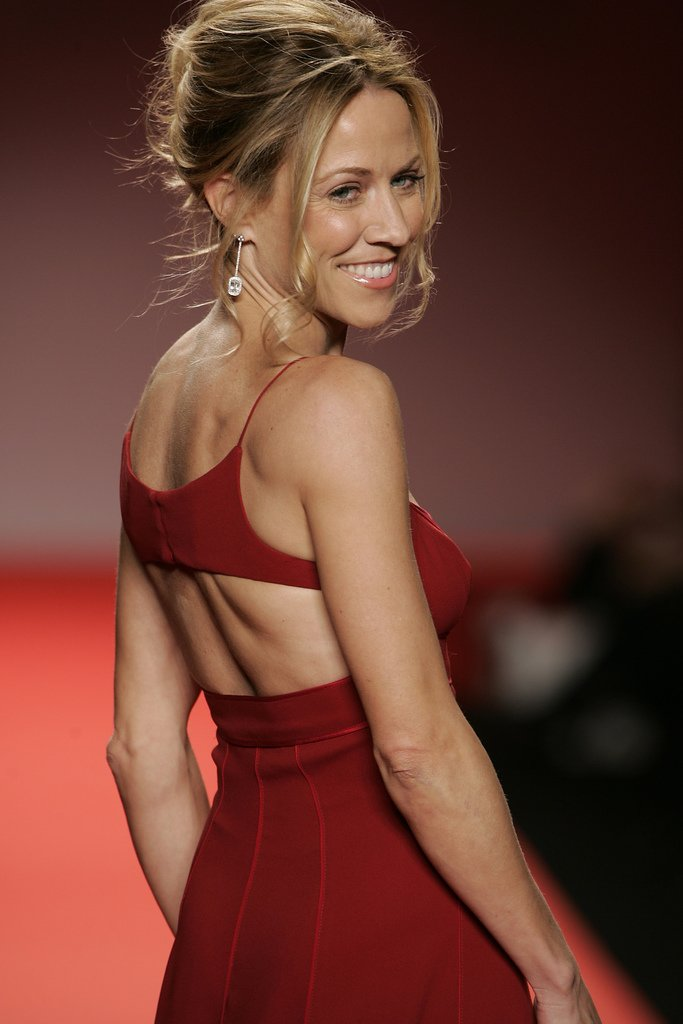
During the song's performance, it was revealed that singer-songwriter Sheryl Crow (pictured) was the only performer to get paid, although in real-life none of the singers who performed "He Needs a Kidney" got paid.

According to Fey, there were discussions on whether or not to use a real talk show host from New York, for the "Dealbreakers" segment, but ultimately decided to make one up and went with actress Napiera Groves who plays talk show host Vontella in "Kidney Now!". The Tracy character plot was based on Tracy Morgan who in real-life was given a diploma by his former high school, DeWitt Clinton High School. Like the Tracy character, who dropped out of high school after being asked to dissect a frog, Morgan dropped out of DeWitt Clinton when his father became ill. Jack and Liz's scene, along with Tracy and Kenneth's, at the end where they watch the charity concert, was filmed the day before the musical number took place. "They were pretending to look at the singing", revealed Fey. They forced that shot in so that the episode not just end with the performance.

Professor Milton Greene was played by guest actor Alan Alda, best known for his role as Hawkeye Pierce from the television series M*A*S*H. This was Alda's second appearance, having appeared in the previous episode "Mamma Mia". In a scene of "Kidney Now!", Tracy breaks down crying and says "There is no baby. I was chicken! I was chicken!" then Milton, who sees this, asks "A guy crying about a chicken and a baby? I thought this was a comedy show." This was a reference to Alda's M*A*S*H character in the series finale episode in which Hawkeye breaks down after realizing he had seen a woman smother her baby to death, not a chicken as Hawkeye had originally recalled in his repressed mind. Comedian actor Chris Parnell, who played Dr. Leo Spaceman in the season finale, has appeared in the main cast of Saturday Night Live (SNL), a weekly sketch comedy series which airs on NBC in the United States. Fey was the head writer on SNL from 1999 until 2006. Comedian and actress Sherri Shepherd reprised her role as Angie Jordan, the wife of Tracy, for the fifth time. Paula Pell made her second guest spot as the character Paula Hornberger, the wife of Pete Hornberger, played by Scott Adsit. In "Kidney Now!", Angie and Paula ask Liz for relationship advice. In addition, 30 Rock writers Jack Burditt, Kay Cannon, and Donald Glover appear in the episode; Burditt and Cannon appear in The Vontella Show segment as members from the audience who ask Liz questions. When Tracy accepts an honorary diploma from his former high school, in his speech, Tracy outs Glover's character. The success of the benefit concert for Milton is not explicitly referenced until Alda's character alludes to it in the season five episode "Christmas Attack Zone", though in the season four episode "Into the Crevasse", Milton is shown to have finished his book entitled From Peanut to President, a biography of U.S. President Jimmy Carter.

One filmed scene from "Kidney Now!" was cut out from the airing. Instead, the scene was featured on 30 Rock's season three DVD as part of the deleted scenes in the Bonus feature. In the scene, Liz enters the TGS writer's room, and tells the writing staff that she got recognized from her appearance on The Vontella Show as the relationship expert from "Dealbreakers". Pete cannot believe that Liz gave actual relationship advice on the program, citing Liz's own past relationship faults.

== Reception ==
According to the Nielsen Media Research, "Kidney Now!" was watched by 5.7 million viewers during its original United States broadcast. The rating was an 8 percent drop in viewership from the previous week's episode, "Mamma Mia", which was seen by 6.2 million American viewers. The show claimed a 2.8 rating/7 share among viewers aged 18 to 49, meaning that 2.8 percent of all people in that group, and 7 percent of all people from that group watching television at the time, watched the episode. Jack Burditt and Robert Carlock received a Primetime Emmy Award nomination for Outstanding Writing in a Comedy Series for their work on "Kidney Now!", but they lost it to fellow 30 Rock writer Matt Hubbard for the episode "Reunion" at the 61st Primetime Emmy Awards. At the same awards show, Tony Pipitone and Griffin Richardson were nominated for a Creative Arts Emmy Award for Outstanding Sound Mixing for a Comedy or Drama Series (half-hour) and Animation.

IGN contributor Robert Canning wrote that the ending from this episode "did have a season finale feel to it with the big musical number. [...] Still, it was a great season, and I loved going out with two of the best characters on TV summing up the moment perfectly – Liz: 'We sure had quite a year.' Jack: 'What are you talking about? It's May.'" Canning gave it an 8.5 out of 10 rating. Television columnist Alan Sepinwall for The Star-Ledger wrote that the "all-star cast of musicians" featured were not able to dominate the episode "to the point where the episode didn't work." Sepinwall, however, added that despite "Kidney Now!" not being a classic 30 Rock episode "it was [still] funny enough – which, I suppose, also makes it an appropriate finale for this uneven season." Further in the review, Sepinwall was complimentary towards Liz's plot, writing that the character's sequence on The Vontella Show was "hilarious, and a fine demonstration of how much confidence Tina Fey has gained as an actress over the years." The A.V. Club's Nathan Rabin also enjoyed the Liz character, reporting that she "delivered a virtuoso performance in [The Vontella Show], instantly homing in on the fatal flaw in every relationship and obliterating it with highly quotable sass." In discussion to Tracy's plot, Rabin opined it was the "weakest of the various threads" in this episode. Bob Sassone of AOL's TV Squad confessed in his recap that he was going to summarize "Kidney Now!" as "a little disappointing, but then I hit rewind on my DVR and watched it again and realized, wow, they actually hit all of the season finale notes rather perfectly [...] This episode was quite funny."

Rick Porter of Zap2it worried how the series would fit in "the likes" of Elvis Costello, Mary J. Blige, Sheryl Crow, Clay Aiken and Adam Levine "without it overwhelming the episode", and reported that the answer to that "turned out to be 'very effectively.'" In regards to the storylines, itself, he noted that Jack's quest in getting Milton a kidney "balanced nicely" with Liz's story, and that Tracy's "had some good moments". In conclusion, Porter wrote "For a show that doesn't always know how to end episodes, it's done really well at ending seasons." TV Guide Magazine's Sandra Kofler wrote that the "He Needs a Kidney" song was hilarious, and that it "stole [30 Rock's] season finale." Patrick Goldstein, a contributor for the Los Angeles Times, was favorable to the musical number, reporting "[t]he song itself is a hoot, highlighted by a wonderful spoken-word kidney donation pitch that begins with Costello saying: 'Listen, when someone starts talking in the middle of a song, you know it's serious.'" Entertainment Weekly contributor Annie Barrett said "Kidney Now!" was "sweet and all", and noted that the "Vontella-as-Tyra spoof" was "brilliant". Time contributor James Poniewozik wrote that this episode "was a fitting end for a guest-star-heavy ... season of 30 Rock", but added that the finale overall was "maybe average", however, "the ending at least delivered the goods, with the best sitcom celebrity benefit song".
