= Rosemary's Baby (30 Rock) =

- 30 Rock episode
- Episode no.: Season 2 Episode 4
- Directed by: Michael Engler
- Written by: Jack Burditt
- Cinematography by: Vanja Černjul
- Production code: 204
- Original air date: October 25, 2007

Guest appearances
- Carrie Fisher as Rosemary Howard; Jean Villepique as Therapist; Paul Scheer as Donny Lawson; Stuart Zagnit as Richard Nixon; Maulik Pancholy as Jonathan; Kevin Brown as Dot Com Slattery; Grizz Chapman as Gris Griswold

Episode chronology
← Previous "The Collection"	Next → "Greenzo"
- 30 Rock season 2

"Rosemary's Baby" is the fourth episode of the second season of 30 Rock, and the twenty-fifth episode overall. It was written by Jack Burditt and was directed by Michael Engler. The episode first aired on October 25, 2007 on the NBC network in the United States. Guest stars in this episode include Carrie Fisher, Paul Scheer, and Stuart Zagnit.

The episode focuses on Liz Lemon's (Tina Fey) escapade with her idol, Rosemary Howard (Carrie Fisher); Tracy Jordan's (Tracy Morgan) family problems; and Jenna Maroney's (Jane Krakowski) attempt to replace Kenneth Parcell's (Jack McBrayer) burnt page jacket. The episode was praised by critics, with Alec Baldwin winning the Primetime Emmy Award for Outstanding Lead Actor in a Comedy Series, and Engler, Burditt, and Fisher all receiving Emmy nominations.

== Plotlines ==
Jack Donaghy (Alec Baldwin) announces that Liz Lemon is the winner of the "G.E. Followship Award", a prize awarded to the G.E. employee who best exemplifies a follower (for Lemon, it was writing a restaurant sketch where a man with a GE microwave for a head dines with Jenna and Tracy), which Liz accepts when she hears that the award comes with a $10,000 prize. Liz takes Pete Hornberger (Scott Adsit) to a book signing to meet Rosemary Howard (Carrie Fisher), a female comedy writer whom Liz has idolized since childhood (her earliest memory of seeing Howard's comedy was on a fictitious episode of Rowan and Martin's Laugh-In, where Richard Nixon moves past a crowd of hippies, saying "Pardon me" and Goldie Hawn in a bikini stops him and says, "Pardon you? You were already pardoned!"). After gushing over how great Rosemary and her comedy is, Liz has lunch with her and invites Rosemary to be a guest writer on The Girlie Show. During a pitch meeting, Rosemary suggests a lot of sketch ideas that, while acceptable in Rosemary's time, would get the show in trouble with audiences and network censors today. Rosemary talks to Jack about her ideas and the direction she wants TGS with Tracy Jordan to go, which Jack initially agrees with, but when Rosemary leaves his office, Jack tells Liz to fire her (and not make him talk to a woman that old again). Liz argues that TGS should be subversive and have comedy that pushes the envelope and makes people think. Jack disagrees, as Liz only got into comedy writing because of her dysfunctional personality and how well it pays. Liz refuses to back down, which causes Liz and Rosemary to get fired. Rosemary is overjoyed that she and Liz are fired, because now they can team up and make the kind of edgy comedy that will shake up Hollywood, but Liz soon regrets her decision to stand by Rosemary when she sees that Rosemary lives in a rundown apartment near the F train, has been drinking wine from her Thermos all day, is pitching a comedy about women in their fifties joining the Army, and has an emotional meltdown when Liz wants to leave. Liz returns to Jack's office, begging for her job back (though, in her eyes, it's "proud begging, like those kids who dance on the subway"). Jack happily obliges, and promises to help Liz learn how to invest her money so she can send Rosemary $400 a week for the rest of Rosemary's life, as she is too drunk and stuck in her 1970s ways to be employed in 2000s America.

When Tracy gets booed for butchering "The Star-Spangled Banner" at a sports event, Jack assures him that as a movie star, his latest faux pas can be fixed and that he can do anything he wants, except for dog fighting, thanks to the Michael Vick controversy. Jack finds Tracy disobeying his order, which was already doomed from the start because Grizz and Dotcom brought in cute, yappy dogs instead of pitbulls. Jack asks Tracy why he's always defying orders, and Tracy replies that he's always been that way (shown in flashbacks of a young Tracy telling off two neighbors and the mailman as he plays with matches, stares at the sun, and goes out wearing women's clothes). Jack suggests that Tracy go to therapy to deal with this unresolved father issues. Jack and Tracy meet with an NBC shrink, and Jack role-plays Tracy's father, Tracy, and Tracy's mom, among several other people from Tracy's childhood (including the white man that Tracy's mom married after his dad left him and a Latina neighbor telling Tracy's family to be quiet), conveying the message that even though Tracy's parents may have divorced, they still loved him. This comforts Tracy, and affirms that while he loves his family, they are crazy, and he needs to stay away from them. Tracy hugs Jack, and tells him that he is the only family he needs.

Jenna accidentally burns Kenneth's page jacket on a hot plate, and Kenneth worries that head page Donny Lawson (Paul Scheer) will punish him. Jenna finds Donny backstage at the studio, who is ecstatic that he finally has a reason to send Kenneth to CNBC in New Jersey. Donny offers Kenneth a choice: go to New Jersey, or compete in a "page off", a contest of physical stamina and NBC trivia. Jenna agrees to the page off. Before the event starts, Pete comes in and yells at the pages to get back to work. He forces Donny to give Kenneth a new jacket (as NBCUniversal is a billion-dollar company and can easily afford to give pages new clothes in case theirs get damaged or worn out), but Donny swears to Jenna and Kenneth that he will get back at them.

== Production ==
"Rosemary's Baby" was mainly filmed on September 11, 2007, while Fisher's scenes were filmed the next day on September 12, 2007. Star Wars is frequently referenced in 30 Rock, beginning with the pilot episode where Tracy Jordan is seen shouting that he is a Jedi. Liz Lemon admits to being a huge fan of Star Wars, saying that she had watched it many times with Pete Hornberger, and dressed up as the Star Wars character Princess Leia during four recent Halloweens. Star Wars is also referenced when Tracy Jordan takes on the identity of the character Chewbacca. Fey, a fan of Star Wars herself, said that the weekly Star Wars joke or reference "started happening organically" when the crew realized that they had a Star Wars reference "in almost every show". Fey said that from then on "it became a thing where [they] tried to keep it going", and that even though they could not include one in every episode, they still had a "pretty high batting average". Fey attributed most of the references to Robert Carlock, who she described as "the resident expert". Prior to the airing of the episode, fans were "raving" about the much awaited guest appearance of Fisher. Fisher's last line in the episode, "Help me, Liz Lemon! You're my only hope!", was a spoof of the line "Help me Obi-Wan Kenobi, you're my only hope!" from her past role in the original Star Wars trilogy, in which she played Princess Leia.

== Reception ==
According to the Nielsen ratings system, "Rosemary's Baby" was viewed by an average of 6.5 million American viewers. The episode achieved a 3.1/8 in key 18–49 demographic. The 3.1 rating refers to 3.1% of all 18- to 49-year-olds in the U.S., and the 8 share refers to 8% of all 18- to 49-year-olds watching television at the time of the broadcast. In the U.S., "Rosemary's Baby" was up by 19% in the rating demographic compared to the previous episode, "The Collection," receiving its highest result since the second season premiere episode, "SeinfeldVision," on October 4, 2007.

"Rosemary's Baby" was named as one of the "Top 11 TV Episodes of 2007" by UGO, and ranked thirteenth on The Futon Critic's list of "the 50 Best Episodes of 2007"; both citing the Baldwin and Morgan therapy scene as the reason. Matt Webb Mitovich of TV Guide declared it as "one of 30 Rock' best episodes ever." He praised Carrie Fisher's guest appearance, but felt that Baldwin's role-playing during the therapy session stole the show. Bob Sassone of TV Squad felt that even though the plot was "insane", the episode still managed "to have a heart at its core". Sassone called the therapy scene "one of the funniest scenes ... on TV this season". Robert Canning of IGN felt that the episode has "great storylines to great guest stars", making it "one of the best the series has produced so far". Canning called the therapy scene "the best moment of the episode". Entertainment Weekly put it on its end-of-the-decade, "best-of" list, saying, " Between Carrie Fisher's delightfully bonkers guest role and Jack Donaghy's hijacking of Tracy Jordan's therapy session, this 2007 episode was so wrong. And so good." In 2016 Emily Nussbaum of The New Yorker described the episode as "the keys-to-all-mythologies of female comedy", which A. O. Scott of The New York Times said "may actually be an understatement. The character of Rosemary Howard certainly embodies the glories and contradictions of second-wave feminism, and Liz's ambivalence about her is a barbed and brilliant illustration of the anxieties of female comic influence". Scott added that given Lemon's depiction as a Star Wars fan, "the casting of Ms. Fisher ... adds about 12 dimensions of meta".

Michael Engler, the director of this episode, was nominated for the Directors Guild of America Award for Outstanding Directing – Comedy Series. This episode also earned Carrie Fisher a Primetime Emmy Award nomination for Outstanding Guest Actress in a Comedy Series and earned Jack Burditt a nomination for Outstanding Writing for a Comedy Series.
