= Mamma Mia (30 Rock) =

- 30 Rock episode
- Episode no.: Season 3 Episode 21
- Directed by: Don Scardino
- Written by: Ron Weiner
- Production code: 321
- Original air date: May 7, 2009

Guest appearances
- Alan Alda as Milton Greene; Steve Buscemi as Lenny Wosniak; Stuart Margolin as Fred O'Dwyer; Keith Olbermann as a sportscaster; Clayton Dean Smith as a photographer; Amy Schumer as Stylist; Michael Benjamin Washington as Donald

Episode chronology
← Previous "The Natural Order"	Next → "Kidney Now!"
- 30 Rock season 3

"Mamma Mia" is the 21st episode of the third season of the American television comedy series 30 Rock, and the 57th overall episode of the series. It was written by co-executive producer Ron Weiner and directed by series producer Don Scardino. The episode originally aired on NBC in the United States on May 7, 2009. Guest stars in this episode include Alan Alda, Steve Buscemi, Stuart Margolin, Keith Olbermann, Clayton Dean Smith, and Michael Benjamin Washington.

In the episode, Jack Donaghy (Alec Baldwin) begins to search for his biological father with help from Liz Lemon (Tina Fey). Meanwhile, Tracy Jordan (Tracy Morgan) introduces his supposedly illegitimate son (Washington) to the cast and crew of the fictitious show The Girlie Show with Tracy Jordan (TGS), but some question his intentions. At the same time, Jenna Maroney (Jane Krakowski) and Liz fight for attention when Jenna gets public recognition for a comedic sketch Liz wrote.

"Mamma Mia" has received generally positive reception from television critics. According to the Nielsen Media Research, the episode was watched by 6.2 million households during its original broadcast. Ron Weiner and Alan Alda received Primetime Emmy Award nominations for Outstanding Writing in a Comedy Series and Outstanding Guest Actor in a Comedy Series, respectively, both for this episode.

== Plot ==
Jack Donaghy (Alec Baldwin) decides not to search for his biological father, after it was revealed in the previous episode that the man he believed was his father was not. Liz Lemon (Tina Fey), however, convinces him to find out who his real father is, so Jack contacts Lenny Wosniak (Steve Buscemi)—a private investigator—to search for his biological father. Lenny gives him an envelope containing the names of three individuals who could be his father. Jack tells Liz about the envelope, and she suggests they Mamma Mia! this and bring the three men to New York under false pretenses, to which Jack agrees. Jack meets the men, George Park, Fred O'Dwyer (Stuart Margolin), and Professor Milton Greene (Alan Alda). At meeting the three men, Jack comes to the realization that Milton is his father, as George Park is Korean and Fred O'Dwyer lost his genitals in a grenade explosion during World War II. He tells Milton that he is his son, after Milton admitted to sleeping with his mother, Colleen Donaghy (Elaine Stritch), around the time Jack was conceived. Milton is happy to have him as his son, and reveals to Jack that he is in need of a kidney transplant.

Meanwhile, Tracy Jordan (Tracy Morgan) introduces his illegitimate son, Donald (Michael Benjamin Washington), to the TGS with Tracy Jordan staff. Liz and Pete Hornberger (Scott Adsit) suspect that Donald is embezzling from Tracy as they do not believe that Donald is twenty-one years old, which Donald claims to be. Cerie Xerox (Katrina Bowden), Liz's assistant, obtains Donald's birth certificate and gives it to Liz and Pete; the two learn that Donald is forty years of age, thus confirming their suspicions about him. Liz tells Tracy about this, but Tracy knew all about Donald's scam, explaining he decided to go along with it because Donald was putting all of the money into a dojo and doing good for the community.

At the same time, Liz becomes jealous when her friend and TGS star Jenna Maroney (Jane Krakowski) takes credit for "That's A Deal Breaker, ladies!" catchphrase, resulting in Liz not getting recognition as she wrote the sketch. As a result of this, Jenna is named the "Funniest Person in New York" by Time Out magazine, and seeing how Liz feels about this, Jenna decides to share the magazine cover with her. At the photo shoot, the photographer (Clayton Dean Smith) wants Jenna to use props for the shoot, but Jenna is reluctant to use any of them. Liz, however, decides to pose with the props, resulting in her being on the cover of Time Out, much to Jenna's displeasure.

== Production ==
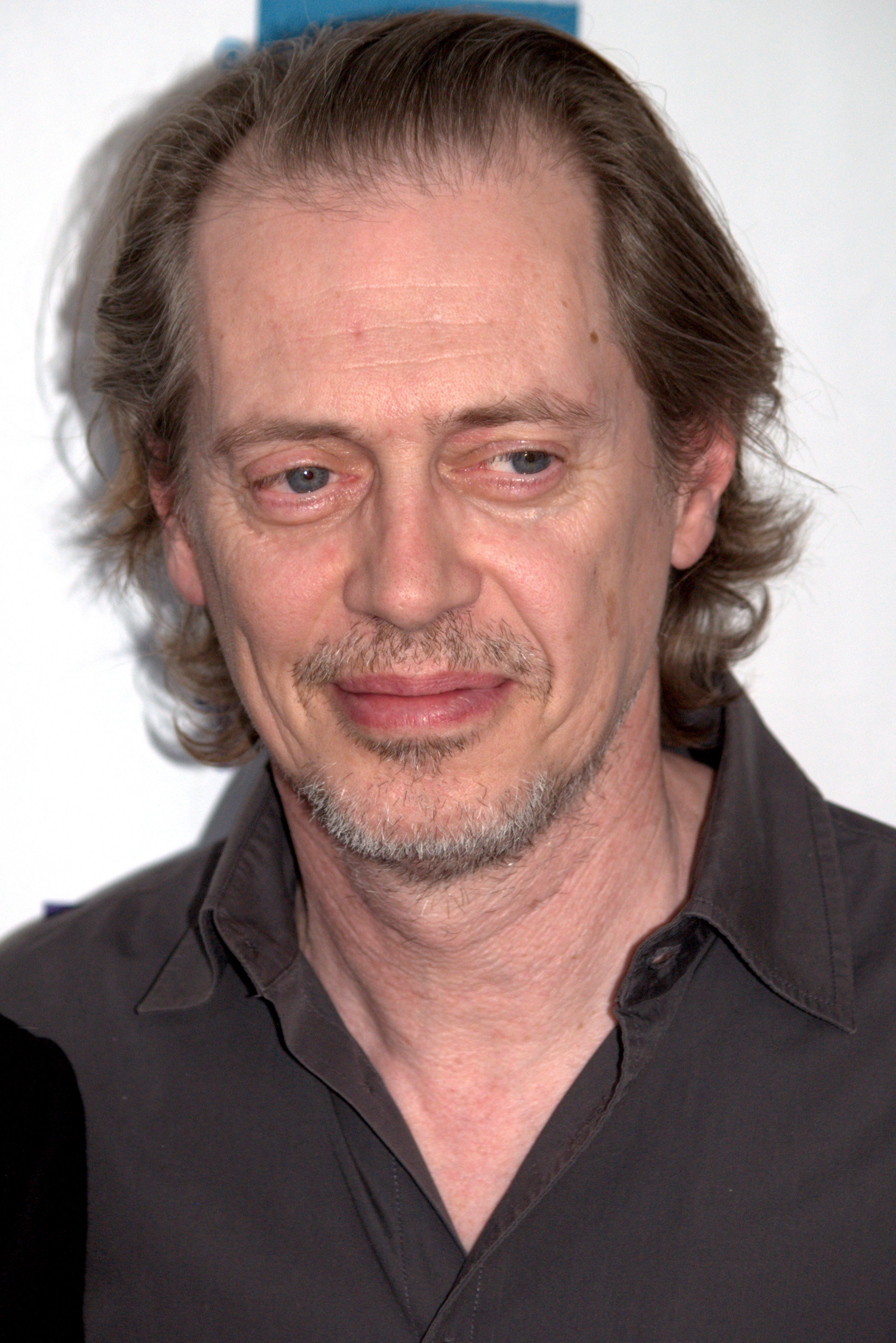
Actor Steve Buscemi guest starred as Lenny Wosniak in "Mamma Mia".

"Mamma Mia" was written by co-executive producer Ron Weiner, making it his fourth writing credit after "Secrets and Lies", "Señor Macho Solo", and "Goodbye, My Friend". The episode was directed by series producer Don Scardino, his twentieth for the series. "Mamma Mia" originally aired in the United States on May 7, 2009, on NBC as the twenty-first episode of the show's third season and the 57th overall episode of the series.

The character Professor Milton Greene, Jack Donaghy's biological father, was played by guest actor Alan Alda, best known for his role as Hawkeye Pierce from the television series M*A*S*H. Alda and Alec Baldwin have worked together, having appeared in the 2004 biographical drama film The Aviator. Actor Steve Buscemi reprised his role as private investigator Lenny Wosniak for the third time, having appeared in "The Collection" and "The Natural Order". Buscemi directed the 30 Rock episode "Retreat to Move Forward" that aired on January 22, 2009, during the show's third season. News anchor Keith Olbermann, of Countdown with Keith Olbermann, did a voice over in this episode, in which Pete recalls hearing a sports anchor (Olbermann) saying the line "That's A Deal Breaker, ladies!" in SportsCenter during a hockey game highlight. The episode also features one of the first on-screen performances by Amy Schumer, who has one line as "Stylist".

One filmed scene from "Mamma Mia" was cut out from the airing. Instead, the scene was featured on 30 Rock's season three DVD as part of the deleted scenes in the Bonus feature. In the scene, NBC page Kenneth Parcell (Jack McBrayer) gives George Park, Fred O'Dwyer, and Milton Greene a tour around the backstage area of TGS. Fred tells Kenneth that he resembles a man he served with in the service, which Kenneth says "Well, obviously that's a coincidence. How could I be in Normandy?". Fred responds by saying that he never told Kenneth where he served. Jack shows up where Kenneth and the three men are, and tells Kenneth that he would like to talk to Milton, prompting Kenneth to tell Jack "As head of this tour, I'm going to deny your request." Jack and Milton are then seen at Jack's office.

== Cultural references ==
Throughout the episode, numerous references are made to the jukebox musical Mamma Mia!, in which Jack tells Liz about his possible three fathers, Jack agreeing to meet with the three men, and Liz saying "And all I'm promising is a madcap musical romp, dot dot dot, fun, dot dot dot, good. ... That was on the [Mamma Mia!] poster", and finally Jack revealing his kinship to Milton. Liz tells Jack that he should find out who his real father is, explaining "If I have learned anything from my Sims family: When a child doesn't see his father enough he starts to jump up and down, then his mood level will drop until he pees himself." The Sims is a video game in which players create virtual people called "Sims" and places them in houses and helps direct their moods and satisfy their desires. Liz and Pete learn from James "Toofer" Spurlock (Keith Powell) that Tracy's favorite television show is NCIS, a CBS police drama series revolving around special agents from the Naval Criminal Investigative Service (NCIS), who conduct criminal investigations involving the U.S. Navy and Marine Corps. Later, Liz and Pete sing the song "It Takes Two" by hip-hop duo Rob Base and DJ E-Z Rock to see if Tracy is familiar with the song as they have doubts about the age Tracy claims to be.

== Reception ==
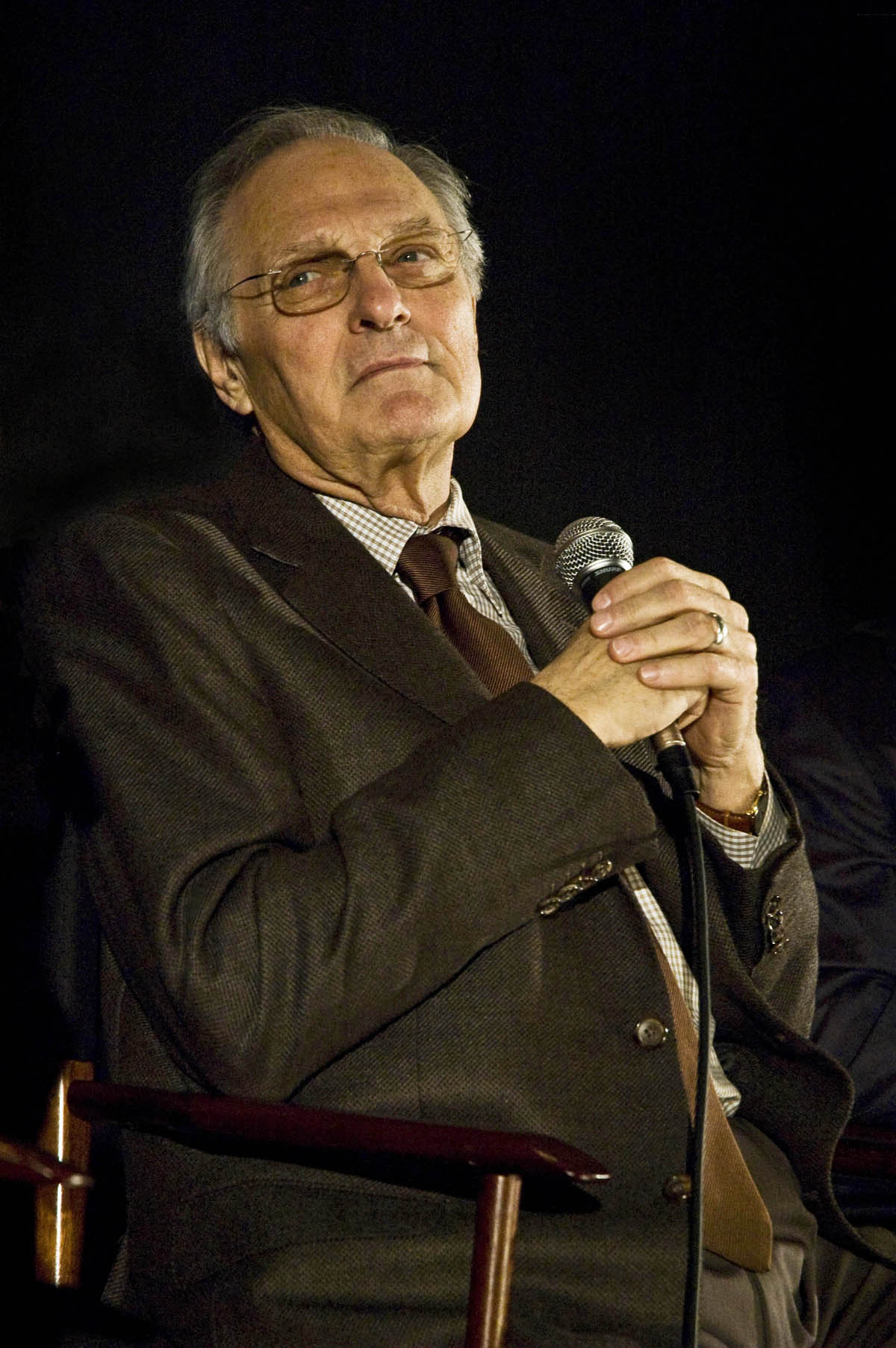
Alan Alda received an Emmy nomination for Outstanding Guest Actor in a Comedy Series for his performance in this episode.

According to the Nielsen Media Research, "Mamma Mia" was watched by 6.2 million households in its original American broadcast. It earned a 2.9 rating/8 share in the 18–49 demographic. This means that it was seen by 2.9 percent of all 18- to 49-year-olds, and 8 percent of all 18- to 49-year-olds watching television at the time of the broadcast. This was an increase from the previous episode, "The Natural Order", which was watched by 6.0 million American viewers. Ron Weiner received a Primetime Emmy Award nomination for Outstanding Writing in a Comedy Series, but lost it to fellow 30 Rock writer Matt Hubbard for the episode "Reunion" at the 61st Primetime Emmy Awards. At the same awards show, Alan Alda received an Emmy nomination for Outstanding Guest Actor in a Comedy Series, but lost it to singer-songwriter Justin Timberlake for hosting Saturday Night Live.

IGN contributor Robert Canning complimented 30 Rock for Jack's search of his father plot, writing that they took it and "rolled forward with energy and smarts and delivered one of the funnier episodes from the past several weeks." Canning said that the other stories were "also very fun", and having been a critic to Jane Krakowski's Jenna, Canning said that her appearance in "Mamma Mia" was "effectively funny without overdoing her self-centeredness." In conclusion, Canning gave it a 9.1 out of 10 rating. Television columnist Alan Sepinwall for The Star-Ledger wrote that this was a "very funny episode, boosted by the ingenious casting of Alan Alda" as Jack's biological father. The A.V. Club's Nathan Rabin praised 30 Rock for delivering "comically" with this episode, and observing there were good elements in it. Rabin opined that the casting of Alda as Jack's father was "inspired", and gave "Mamma Mia" an A− grade rating. Entertainment Weekly contributor Aly Semigran was complimentary towards the episode, and appreciated the guest appearances from Alda and Steve Buscemi. Bruce Fretts for TV Guide Magazine said that "Mamma Mia" was "strong", and cited that it had "quotable inside-TV digs ... an instant chemistry between Alec Baldwin and Alan Alda ... and an infectious rendition of 'It Takes Two' by Liz and Pete." Mike Moody of AOL's TV Squad hoped that "someone on the show figure out" what to do with the Jenna character, and suggested that she have a love interest "that makes her mature or ... makes her move away" because Jenna's "vacuous, selfish aging diva routine has gotten old already." Moody, however, said that the best part of Tracy's story was the karate showdown between Donald and J. D. Lutz (John Lutz).
