= Reunion (30 Rock) =

- 30 Rock episode
- Episode no.: Season 3 Episode 5
- Directed by: Beth McCarthy-Miller
- Written by: Matt Hubbard
- Production code: 305
- Original air date: December 4, 2008

Guest appearances
- Susan Barrett as Diane; Marceline Hugot as Kathy Geiss; Robyn Lively as Kelsey Winthrop; Janel Moloney as Jessica; Diane Neal as Erin; Rip Torn as Don Geiss; Steve Witting as Rob Sussman

Episode chronology
| ← Previous "Gavin Volure" | Next → "Christmas Special" |
- 30 Rock season 3

"Reunion" is the fifth episode of the third season of American television comedy series 30 Rock, and the 41st episode of the series overall. It was written by supervising producer Matt Hubbard and directed by Beth McCarthy-Miller. The episode originally aired on NBC in the United States on December 4, 2008. Guest stars in this episode include Susan Barrett, Marceline Hugot, Robyn Lively, Janel Moloney, Diane Neal, Rip Torn, and Steve Witting.

In the episode, Liz Lemon (Tina Fey) is opposed to going to her high school reunion, but her boss, Jack Donaghy (Alec Baldwin), manages to convince her otherwise. Meanwhile, Don Geiss (Rip Torn) wakes up from his coma only to inform Jack of his decision to remain CEO of General Electric (GE). At the same time, Tracy Jordan (Tracy Morgan) and Jenna Maroney (Jane Krakowski) feel threatened by NBC page Kenneth Parcell (Jack McBrayer) when he gets more laughs than they do in the elevator.

"Reunion" has received generally positive reception from television critics. According to the Nielsen ratings system, it was watched by 7.2 million households during its original broadcast. Matt Hubbard won the Primetime Emmy Award for Outstanding Writing for a Comedy Series, while Beth McCarthy-Miller received a nomination for Outstanding Directing for a Comedy Series.

== Plot ==
Liz receives an invitation to her upcoming high school reunion in White Haven, Pennsylvania. She is reluctant to attend as she was the lonely nerd girl in high school who got bullied by the pretty, popular kids (as seen when Kelsey Winthrop snarkily asks her about her astronomy project and Liz mumbles a response and puts her headphones on her ears to block them out) and that being at the reunion will just bring back horrible feelings over that. Don Geiss wakes up from his diabetic coma and tells Jack he will remain CEO of General Electric (GE). Distraught by the revelation, as Don had chosen Jack as the CEO to run GE, Jack decides to fly to Miami for a vacation, and offers to drop Liz off on the way to her reunion. When they land in White Haven after a major snowstorm, Jack is stranded with her.

Liz goes to the reunion, where everyone is surprised that Liz showed up, not because she has grown into herself and shed her nerd girl appearance, but because the formerly pretty and popular crowd were afraid of Liz for being a snide, antisocial nerd who shot down their attempts at friendship with a pointed put-down (like when Kelsey Winthrop sincerely asked her how her astronomy project was going, Liz shot back by making fun of Kelsey's mom's pill addiction) and that those insults have caused a lot of physical and mental distress to them. Jack in search of a drink ends up at the reunion as well, and is mistaken for a former popular student Larry Braverman and still unhappy with Geiss' decision, takes on the persona. Liz tries to regain the friendship of her classmates—Kelsey Winthrop (Robyn Lively), Erin O'Neil (Diane Neal), Rob Sussman (Steve Witting), and Diane (Susan Barrett)—without success. Jack, as Larry Braverman, persuades them to like Liz, until an ex-girlfriend (Janel Moloney) of Larry's reveals he has a son, at which point Jack confesses he is not Larry and Liz and Jack both make a quick escape whilst being booed off stage; Liz happily going back to mistreating her former classmates after they attempt to reenact the pig's blood scene from Carrie on her.

Meanwhile, at the 30 Rock studios, Tracy is shocked when Kenneth gets more laughs than he does in the elevator, compelling him to go to Jenna for help. The same thing happens to Jenna and in retaliation, she starts singing "Wind Beneath My Wings", prompting Kenneth to start singing "99 Bottles of Beer", to which everyone in the elevator joins in. As revenge for upstaging them, Tracy and Jenna start doing his page duties which confuses Kenneth. After Tracy explains what Kenneth was doing, Kenneth feels terrible about it and swears never to upstage them again.

== Production ==
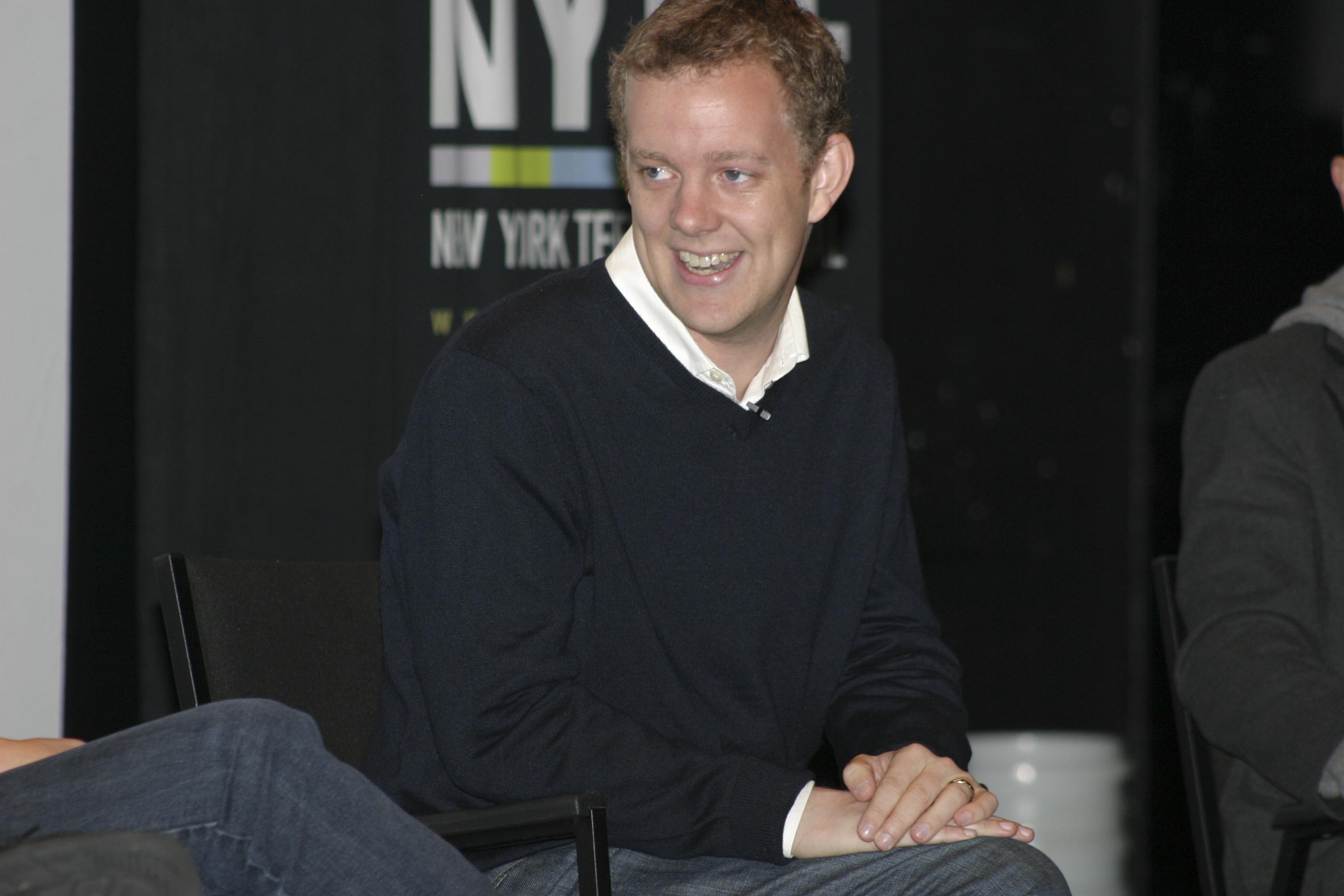
"Reunion" was written by supervising producer Matt Hubbard (pictured).

"Reunion" was written by 30 Rock supervising producer Matt Hubbard, making it his fifth writing credit after "The Rural Juror", "Hard Ball", "The Collection", and "MILF Island". The episode was directed by Beth McCarthy-Miller, making it her fourth for the series. "Reunion" originally aired in the United States on December 4, 2008, on NBC as the fifth episode of the show's third season and the 41st overall episode of the series.

Actor Rip Torn made his sixth appearance on the show as GE CEO Don Geiss, after appearing in the episodes "The C Word", "Corporate Crush", "Jack Gets in the Game", "Succession", and "Sandwich Day". This was actress Marceline Hugot's sixth guest spot in the series as Kathy Geiss, the daughter of Don Geiss. St. Cecilia's Catholic Church served as the high school where Liz Lemon attends her high school reunion. In September 2008, it was reported that actresses Blake Lively and Leighton Meester, who star on Gossip Girl, were set to guest star on the show as former high school classmates of Liz's in a flashback sequence, but the appearances fell through. 30 Rock and Gossip Girl were shot next to each other at Silvercup Studios in Queens, New York. Actress Robyn Lively, the half-sister of Blake Lively, guest starred in "Reunion" as Kelsey Winthrop, a former classmate of Liz's.

In this episode, Liz says the line "I want to go to there", twice, which according to series creator, executive producer and lead actress Tina Fey was "coined" by her daughter, Alice. In an interview with the New York Daily News, Jane Krakowski, who portrays Jenna Maroney, revealed "Some of the great catchphrases of 30 Rock have come from Alice. Like, 'I want to go [to] there!' – that's Alice. It's so funny because I hear people say it on the street, and that was [Tina's] daughter!"

== Cultural references ==
Jack, believing that Don Geiss will give him the CEO job, and after learning about Liz's high school reunion, says "I wish I had a Princeton reunion right now. I'd wipe the smug smile off Michelle Obama's face", a reference to Michelle Obama who graduated from Princeton, and to her husband, Barack Obama, who won the 2008 U.S. Presidential Election. At the reunion, Rob Sussman, a past classmate of Liz's, complains that Liz said he was gayer than the volleyball scene in the 1986 action film Top Gun. During the reunion, Liz's former classmates play Seven minutes in heaven, a game in which two people are selected to go into a closet or other dark enclosed space and do whatever they like for seven minutes, often kissing. Later, Liz's classmates plan to "Carrie" her on stage as revenge for her being mean to them, but is stopped by Jack saying "we cannot Carrie Liz Lemon". This is a reference to the 1976 horror film Carrie in which the title character is drenched with pig's blood.

== Reception ==
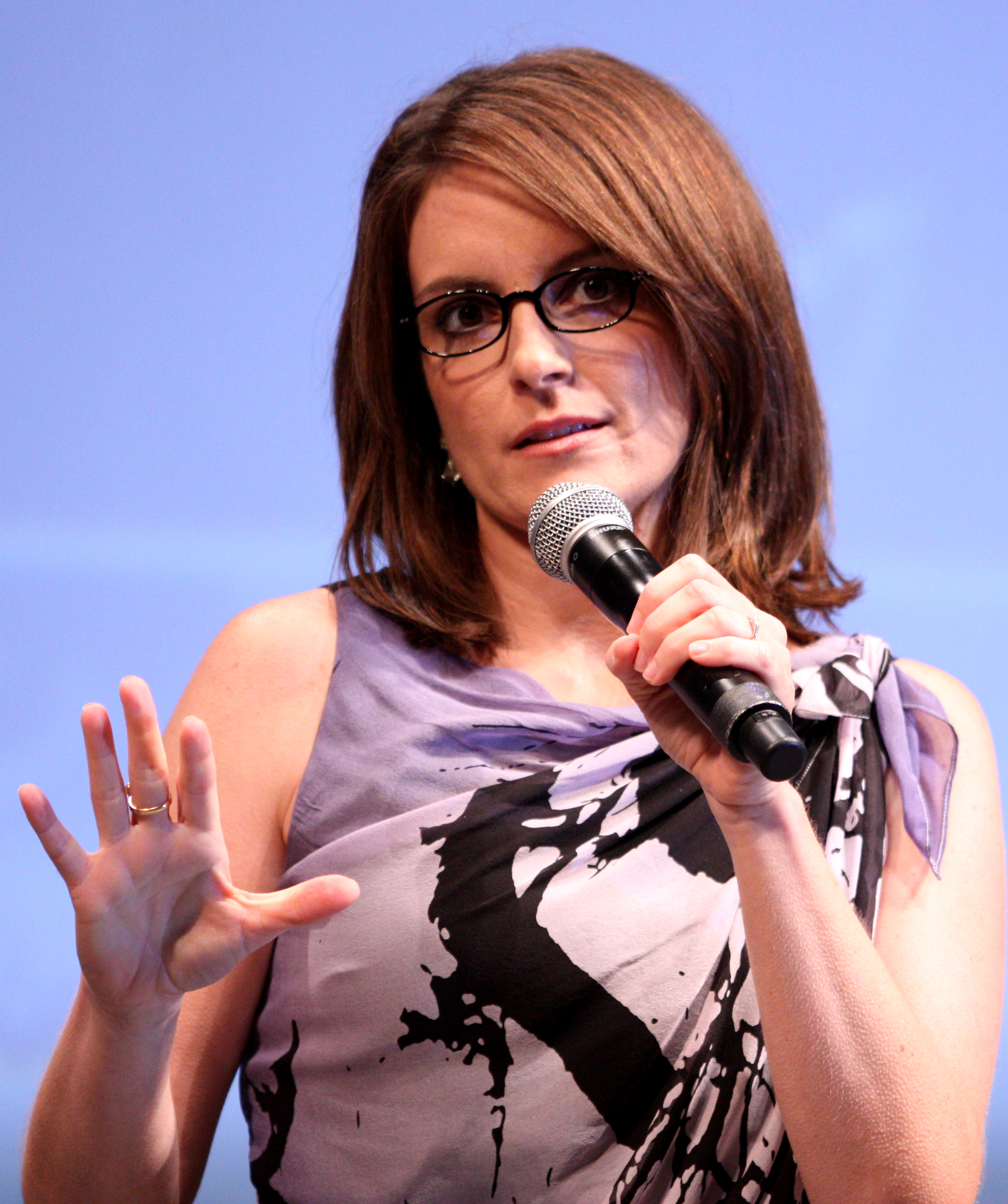
Tina Fey received a Primetime Emmy Award nomination for Outstanding Lead Actress in a Comedy Series for her performance in this episode.

In its original American broadcast, "Reunion" was watched by 7.2 million households, according to the Nielsen ratings system. It received a 3.4 rating/8 share among viewers in the 18–49 demographic, meaning that 3.4 percent of all people in that group, and 8 percent of all people from that group watching television at the time, watched the episode. "Reunion" finished in ninth place in the weekly ratings for the week of December 1–7, 2008. Matt Hubbard won the Primetime Emmy Award for Outstanding Writing for a Comedy Series, while Beth McCarthy-Miller received a nomination for Outstanding Directing for a Comedy Series at the 61st Primetime Emmy Awards. This episode was submitted for consideration on the behalf of Tina Fey for Outstanding Lead Actress in a Comedy Series at the same awards show, but lost it to actress Toni Collette. Hubbard was nominated for a Writers Guild of America Award for "Reunion", but lost it in a tie to fellow 30 Rock writer Robert Carlock for the episode "Apollo, Apollo" and Modern Family's Steven Levitan and Christopher Lloyd for the pilot episode.

IGN contributor Robert Canning gave the episode an 8.9 rating out of 10 and wrote "...the real reason to watch, as always, was Tina Fey and Alec Baldwin and their fantastic comedic performances." Canning responded favorably to the episode with the exception of the Tracy, Jenna, and Kenneth storyline, calling it "silly". Television columnist Alan Sepinwall for The Star-Ledger wrote that Jack taking on the Larry Braverman persona "gave Baldwin a chance to play a delightfully goofy strain of those occasional glimpses we get of a happy Jack." Like Sepinwall, Bob Sassone of AOL's TV Squad was favorable to Jack going to the reunion, but most enjoyed the character impersonating Larry Braverman, observing it was a "well-used plot device" as Baldwin "made it believable". TV Guide's Matt Mitovich was positive about "Reunion", calling it a "nice" episode. Jeff Labrecque for Entertainment Weekly enjoyed the episode, and said that "Reunion" was the first episode of the season that "I think the show benefited from the refocused attention on its core characters. The reunion plot was so strong, and the Carrie finale so inspired, that I hope the viewership ratings reflect positively and encourage a continuance of this creative trend." The A.V. Club's Nathan Rabin wrote that he was "much more amused" by Rob Sussman's "still-simmering rage" against Liz, because he "scored many of the show's biggest laughs." He said that he found the second plot "a little underwhelming though I thought there was a neat meta-textual element to it", but wrote that it "scored some nice shots at the vapid narcissism of actors but it promised more than it could deliver." Rick Porter of Zap2it said that despite the "super-capital-A-list guest stars" that guest starred at the beginning of the season, "Reunion" got back "to the show's core cast ... [and] the show gave us probably the best episode of the season." Time contributor James Poniewozik opined that this episode was "pretty good" and "funny in most of the usual 30 Rock ways."

Not all reviews were positive. Jeremy Medina of Paste wrote that "Reunion" was "essentially unremarkable (especially in its portrayal of Liz)". Medina disliked that Tina Fey's Liz was portrayed in "unlikable light", and after insulting her former classmates at the high school reunion it "seemed a bit uncharacteristic and unflattering to her character."
