= The Natural Order =

- 30 Rock episode
- Episode no.: Season 3 Episode 20
- Directed by: Scott Ellis
- Written by: Tina Fey; John Riggi
- Production code: 320
- Original air date: April 30, 2009

Guest appearances
- Steve Buscemi as Lenny Wosniak; Elaine Stritch as Colleen Donaghy; John Cunningham as Paul

Episode chronology
← Previous "The Ones"	Next → "Mamma Mia"

"The Natural Order" is the twentieth episode of the third season of the American television comedy show 30 Rock. It was written by series creator Tina Fey with co-executive producer John Riggi and directed by Scott Ellis. The episode originally aired on NBC in the United States on April 30, 2009. Guest stars in "The Natural Order" include actors Elaine Stritch and Steve Buscemi.

The plot of the episode centers around a conflict between Tracy Jordan (Tracy Morgan) and Liz Lemon (Fey) over favorable treatment. Meanwhile, Jenna Maroney (Jane Krakowski) adopts a gibbon and treats it like her child. Finally, Jack Donaghy's (Alec Baldwin) mother Colleen (Stritch) visits him on the 35th anniversary of the day that Jack's father left the family.

"The Natural Order" received mixed reception from television critics. According to the Nielsen ratings system, it was watched by 6 million households during its original broadcast, and received a 2.7 rating/7 share among viewers in the 18–49 demographic.

== Plot ==
Liz (Tina Fey), Kenneth Parcell (Jack McBrayer), and Pete Hornberger (Scott Adsit) all attempt to trick Tracy into arriving at a rehearsal on time. Tracy arrives not knowing what time it is and announces that Liz is racist and treating him like a child. Liz challenges Tracy to behave better so he can be treated as an adult, but he responds by sending a gibbon to replace himself at rehearsal. Liz tells Tracy to arrive on time with his lines memorized the next day if he wants to be treated equally. Tracy retaliates by acting professionally but convincing everyone to treat Liz equally too, by making her lift heavy water jugs, passing gas near her, and inviting her to a strip club along with the other writers. Liz in turn stops Tracy from going to the strip club, noting that because he is acting so professionally he has to write notes for the upcoming script. Liz is uncomfortable at the strip club and Tracy hates writing all night so they agree to return to the "natural order" of things with both receiving preferential treatment.

Meanwhile, Jenna adopts the gibbon Tracy sends to rehearsal and treats it as her child. She dresses it in several costumes including a mariachi outfit, a tuxedo, and a sailor suit. In addition she buys the gibbon a baby doll, referring to herself as a "grandmother." At the end of the episode Jenna accidentally shakes the head off of the baby doll and the gibbon attacks her.

Jack is concerned for his mother, Colleen (Elaine Stritch). He tells Liz that the anniversary of his father, Jimmy Donaghy, abandoning their family is coming up and he is afraid of the effect it will have on Colleen. When Jack arrives at Colleen's hotel room to take her to dinner, however, he discovers she is staying with a man, Paul. Jack, worried she has been taken in by a con man in her time of grief, asks his private investigator Lenny Wosniak (Steve Buscemi) to look into Paul. Wosniak cannot find anything distasteful in Paul's background, but tells Jack that he is married. Jack reveals this to his mother, but she says she knew and did not care. Colleen is also surprised that Jack thought the anniversary of Jimmy leaving would hurt her, noting that he had once left from the spring of 1957 until he came back and invited her to see Some Like It Hot. Jack talks this over with Liz and comes to realize that as Some Like It Hot was released in 1959, Jimmy Donaghy cannot have been his biological father because Jack was conceived in 1958, during the period Jimmy had been absent.

== Production ==
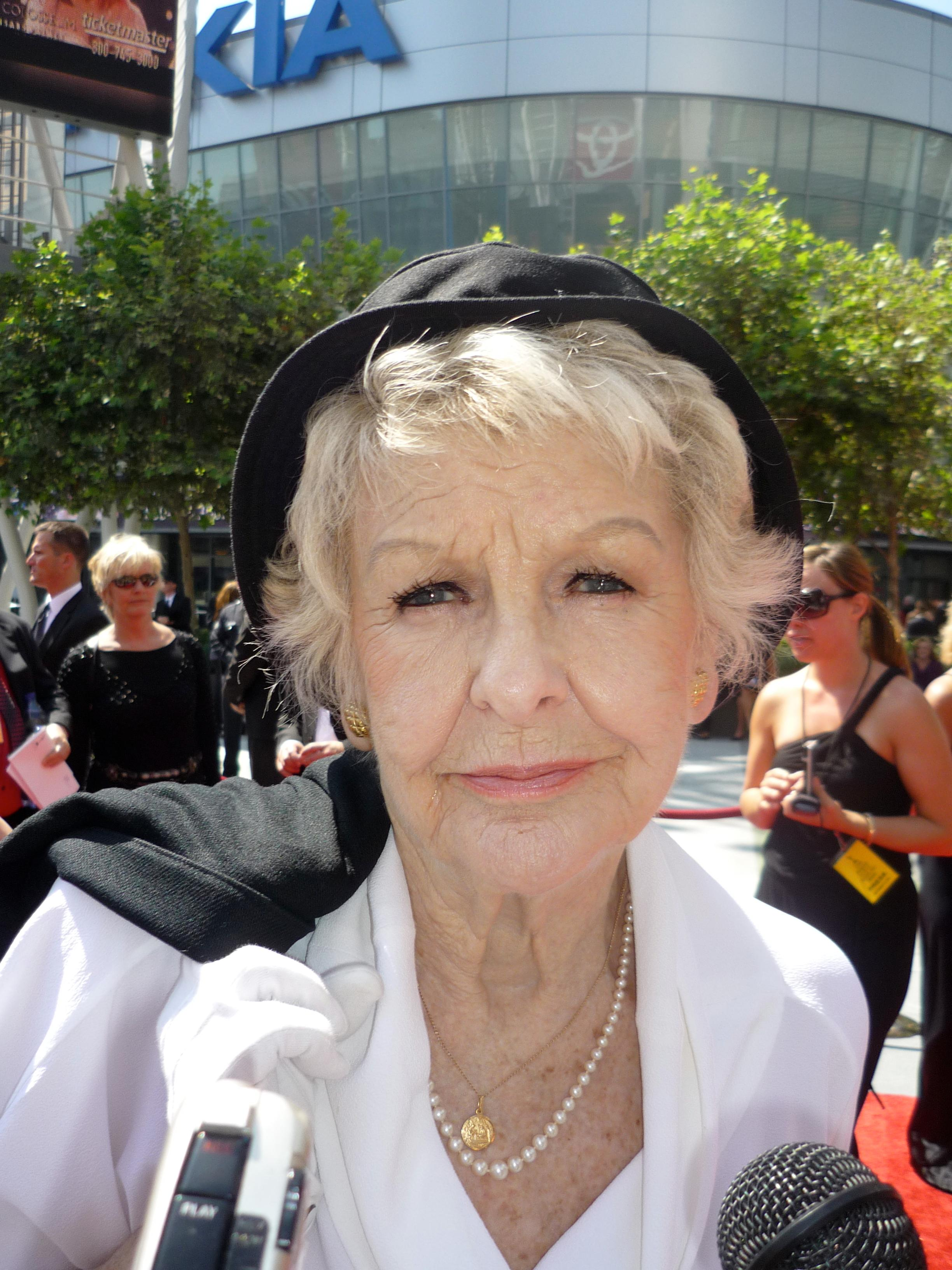
"The Natural Order" was Elaine Strich's fifth appearance as Colleen Donaghy, Jack's mother.

"The Natural Order" was written by series' creator, executive producer and lead actress Tina Fey, and co-executive producer John Riggi. The director of this episode was Scott Ellis. This was Fey and Riggi's second script collaboration, having co-written season one episode "The Head and the Hair" that aired on January 18, 2007. "The Natural Order" originally aired on April 30, 2009, on NBC in the United States as the twentieth episode of the show's third season.

This episode was actress Elaine Stritch's fifth appearance on 30 Rock as Collen Donaghy, the mother of Jack Donaghy, played by Alec Baldwin. Actor Steve Buscemi reprised his role as private investigator Lenny Wosniak. Buscemi first appeared in the October 18, 2007, episode "The Collection", and went on to direct the third-season episode "Retreat to Move Forward", broadcast on January 22, 2009.

== Cultural references ==
"The Natural Order" is one of several 30 Rock episodes to deal with race. (Note: Other episodes of 30 Rock with race-related plotlines include "The Source Awards", "The Collection" and "Jack-Tor".) In this episode, when Tracy leaves the first rehearsal accusing Liz of racism he shouts "race card!" and hands Liz a card with "race card" written on it ("playing the race card" is an expression that means introducing the issue of race into an argument in order to gain the upper hand). During their disagreement Tracy also says that "we have a black president now", referring to Barack Obama, but Liz says that he voted for Ralph Nader. According to J. Jeremy Wisnewski in "Race At The Rock: Race Cards, White Myths, And Postracial America", this plotline is an example of people "want[ing] to have race and do away with it too." Tracy wants to be treated equally but also wants to continue behaving the way he is used to. Wisnewski says that by the end of the episode, Liz and Tracy, in reverting to "the natural order", have come to understand the concept of equality; rather than forcing people "to be equivalent to one another ... considering the different interests of people equally."

Jack tells Liz that by protecting his mother this time, as opposed to when his father left, he can "put right what once went wrong" which Liz notes is part of the introduction to the television series Quantum Leap. Jack had written a speech to confront Jimmy Donaghy decades ago and attempts to update it for his confrontation with Paul. He asks Liz who is "today's Nikita Khrushchev" and she suggests Simon Cowell, which Jack agrees with. Jack is also suspicious of Paul because he met his mother in Florida, which Jack calls "America's Australia," referring to Australia's history as a penal colony. Kenneth also shows an NBC tour the spot where "Gracie Allen took Jack Paar's virginity" and Jack reveals that he once slept with Kathy Hilton.

== Reception ==
In its original American broadcast, "The Natural Order" was watched by 6 million viewers, according to the Nielsen ratings system. It also earned a 2.7 rating/7 share amongst 18- to 49-year-old demographic, meaning it was seen by 2.7% of all 18- to 49-year-olds and 7% of 18- to 49-year-olds watching television at the time of the broadcast. It was the tenth highest-rated show on NBC that week. This was a decrease from the previous episode, "The Ones", which was watched by 6.3 million American viewers.

Aly Semigran for Entertainment Weekly said the episode "was nowhere near as good" as other recent episodes as it was "too dependent on obvious physical comedy." IGN writer Robert Canning took no strong position on the episode, saying it had "jokes enough to make it funny, but nothing over the top to make it classic," rating the episode 8.2 out of 10. The A.V. Club's Nathan Rabin was more clearly positive about the episode, calling it a "glorious return to form" and grading the episode an A−. Bob Sassone of AOL's TV Squad opined he was not thrilled with Jenna's plot, observing that it was "kinda ridiculous (and unfunny, which is the worse sin)." Sassone, however, said that Liz and Tracy feuding and Jack and his mother battling "are plots that are always good for some laughs." Television columnist Alan Sepinwall for The Star-Ledger wrote that while "The Natural Order" was not a "classic episode" it was still "solid enough, in the end." Sepinwall enjoyed Jack and his mother's story, but commented that the Liz and Tracy rivalry was a "hit-or-miss." TV Guide's Bruce Fretts said this episode "is easily the show's most grounded episode ever, even if it does feature a gibbon in a mariachi suit. The script [...] dares to deal with issues of race and gender from a typically irreverent perspective." Fretts noted that Elaine Stritch and Alec Baldwin "share a surprisingly tender scene as Colleen tells her son, 'You're my good boy [...] I just love you to death.'"
