= John Cunningham (actor) =

American actor (1932–2026)

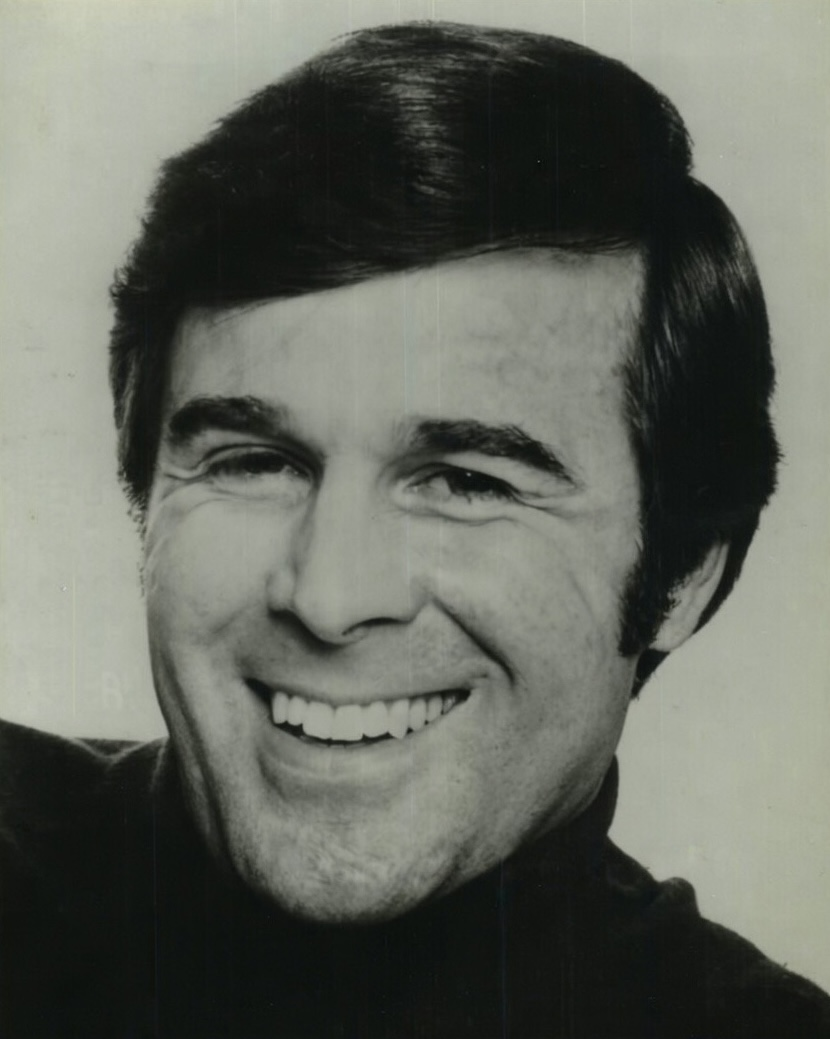
- Cunningham in 1970
- Born: June 22, 1932; Auburn, New York, U.S.
- Died: January 6, 2026 (aged 93); Rye, New York, U.S.
- Occupation: Actor
- Years active: 1951–2013
- Spouse: Carolyn Cotton Cunningham

John Cunningham (June 22, 1932 – January 6, 2026) was an American actor.

Cunningham was born in Auburn, New York, on June 22, 1932. He joined the United States Army and would perform in plays for troops. He was married to Carolyn Cotton Cunningham for almost 70 years. He died at his home in Rye, New York, on January 6, 2026, at the age of 93.

== Filmography ==
- Search for Tomorrow (1951)
- Another World (1964)
- One Life to Live (1968)
- Matilda (1978)
- The Big Fix (1978)
- Lost and Found (1979)
- Loving (1983)
- Twisted (1986)
- Hello Again (1987)
- Johnny Be Good (1988)
- Mystic Pizza (1988)
- Guiding Light (1988)
- Dead Poets Society (1989)
- Law & Order (1991–2008)
- School Ties (1992)
- For Love or Money (1993)
- Roommates (1995)
- Nixon (1995)
- In & Out (1997)
- Starship Troopers (1997)
- The Jackal (1997)
- Isn't She Great (2000)
- Shaft (2000)
- Two Weeks Notice (2002)
- 30 Rock (2009): "The Natural Order"
- Blue Bloods (2013)
