= SeinfeldVision =

- 30 Rock episode
- Episode no.: Season 2 Episode 1
- Directed by: Don Scardino
- Written by: Tina Fey
- Cinematography by: Vanja Černjul
- Production code: 201
- Original air date: October 4, 2007

Guest appearances
- Kevin Brown as Dot Com Slattery; Oksana Lada as Saleswoman; Maulik Pancholy as Jonathan; Jerry Seinfeld as himself

Episode chronology
← Previous "Hiatus"	Next → "Jack Gets in the Game"
- 30 Rock season 2

"SeinfeldVision" is the first episode of the second season of 30 Rock and the twenty-second episode of the series. It was written by the series' creator, executive producer and lead actress, Tina Fey and directed by producer Don Scardino. The episode first aired on October 4, 2007 on the NBC network in the United States.

This episode takes place in the fall of 2007, as TGS with Tracy Jordan, a fictitious sketch comedy series, is about to air its season premiere. Liz Lemon (played by Fey) is seeking closure after breaking up with her boyfriend, Floyd (Jason Sudeikis), while Jack Donaghy (Alec Baldwin) is planning to launch a month of programming called SeinfeldVision. Jenna Maroney (Jane Krakowski) has to deal with her obesity, which she developed over the summer. Kenneth Parcell (Jack McBrayer) becomes Tracy Jordan's (Tracy Morgan) "office wife" and Cerie (Katrina Bowden) continues to prepare for her wedding to Aris. The episode received generally positive reviews from critics and fans.

== Plot ==
As Liz is returning to studio 6H, the TGS with Tracy Jordan studio, she meets Jack. In his office, he tells her about a promotion he is planning to launch called SeinfeldVision, a month of programming starring Jerry Seinfeld made possible with footage from his sitcom, Seinfeld, being edited into programs. After hearing of Jack's plan, Jerry arrives at 30 Rock to confront Jack. Jack and Jerry agree to shorten the promotion to just one night.

Liz is seeking closure after breaking up with her boyfriend Floyd during the summer and a chance encounter with Jerry gives her the advice she needs, so she calls Floyd only for another woman to pick up the phone. While dealing with her problems, Liz and Jenna are invited to be Cerie's maids of honour. They accept the invitation. Cerie takes them shopping for her wedding dress, and when asked to try one on, Liz decides to buy one.

After performing in Mystic Pizza: The Musical, Jenna has become fat and is trying to distract people from noticing it, to no avail. Tracy has separated from his wife, Angie Jordan (Sherri Shepherd) and is living in his dressing room having Kenneth as his "office wife", to take care of the non-sexual acts that Tracy's wife would normally perform.

== Production ==
It was announced, by Fey and executive producer Lorne Michaels, at the annual Television Critics Association tour in July 2007 that Jerry Seinfeld would be appearing in the season premiere of 30 Rock. Seinfeld had only appeared in two television acting roles since his own sitcom ended in 1998. Those roles were in Mad About You and Newsradio.

The scenes featuring Jerry Seinfeld were filmed on August 20, 2007. Seinfeld wore a wig in the episode to make him look more like the character version of Jerry Seinfeld. Upon first wearing the wig, Seinfeld said "This looks weird," but his wife assured him "That's what [he] looked like [in Seinfeld]." This episode effectively ended the story arc of Liz's relationship with Floyd, which began midway through season one. There was a joke in this episode in which Cerie's surname was revealed as Xerox, but the joke was cut. This is the first episode in which Katrina Bowden (as Cerie), Keith Powell (James "Toofer" Spurlock) and Lonny Ross (Josh Girard) receive star billing.

== Reception ==
"SeinfeldVision" brought in an average of 7.33 million American viewers, making 30 Rock the sixtieth most watched series of the week. When it first aired, this episode was the second highest-rated episode of the series, after "Pilot", which garnered 8.13 million viewers. This episode achieved a 3.4/9 in the key 18–49 demographic, a series high in that category. The 3.4 refers to 3.4% of all 18- to 49-year-olds in the U.S. and the 9 refers to 9% of all 18- to 49-year-olds watching television at the time of the broadcast, in the U.S.

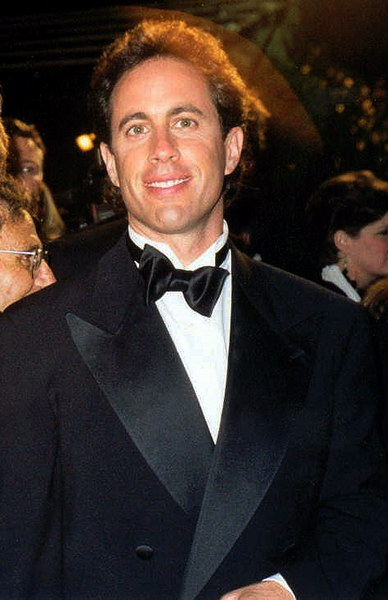
Alessandra Stanley of The New York Times criticized Jerry Seinfeld for promoting Bee Movie in the episode.

Jeff Labrecque of Entertainment Weekly wrote that "SeinfeldVision was a clever and ironic way to incorporate Seinfeld." Matt Webb Mitovich of TV Guide said that "['SeinfeldVision'] was a solid start to the new, fought-for season" and that it did have "some great, great moments." Despite this praise, Webb Mitovich criticised Kenneth and Tracy's "office wife" storyline saying that "we've seen this shtick before on countless other sitcoms, so it was a bit empty and filled with 'easy' jokes." Criticism was also received regarding the "striped outfit... it didn't work. No," referring to a joke involving Jenna trying to distract the TGS writers from her newly gained weight. Lisa Schmeiser of Television Without Pity graded this episode as a "B+." Rick Porter of Zap2it thought that this episode "started off [30 Rock's] second season on a pretty strong note." Porter said that this episode wasn't the best episode of 30 Rock but it was still "one of the sharpest and wittiest comedies on television." Bob Sassone of AOL's TV Squad wrote that "SeinfeldVision" "was a really funny beginning to the second season." Sassone also notes that the appearance of Seinfeld did not feel like stunt casting. He also said that the joke about Jerry being able to buy NBC for $4 million was "one of the many reasons [he, Sassone, loves] this show." Rob Owen of the Pittsburgh Post-Gazette wrote that this episode "proves the low-rated show's best comedy Emmy win was no undeserved fluke." Alan Sepinwall of The Star-Ledger described this episode as "really funny" and thought that "everyone is played in a style that's believable within [the series]." Linda Stasi of the New York Post said that "the on-going story of the regulars that had me laughing so hard I almost fell out of bed." Jake Brooks of The New York Observer thought that this episode was "a rather poor 22 minutes of television (well, only [Jerry Seinfeld's] portion of it, the rest was pretty great)." Robert Canning of IGN said that "30 Rock delivers a fantastic episode to open the season. Let's hope they can also deliver an audience to keep this great show on the air." Canning also awarded this episode a rating of 9.4 out of 10. Brian Lowry of Variety said that it "neatly highlights this series' strengths and weaknesses, elevated by moments of inspiration and Alec Baldwin's brilliance and leavened by considerably-less-flattering silliness." Alessandra Stanley of The New York Times thought that "SeinfeldVision" "is mostly a reminder that even the most talented actors and writers sometimes slip under pressure." Seinfeld was criticized as using his appearance in this episode as a plug for his upcoming feature film Bee Movie. Seinfeld, NBC and General Electric stated that this was done as metahumor.
