= Jack Gets in the Game =

- 30 Rock episode
- Episode no.: Season 2 Episode 2
- Directed by: Michael Engler
- Written by: Robert Carlock
- Cinematography by: Vanja Černjul
- Production code: 202
- Original air date: October 11, 2007

Guest appearances
- Fajer Al-Kaisi as Hot Dog Vendor; Will Arnett as Devon Banks; Kevin Brown as Dot Com Slattery; Grizz Chapman as Gris Griswold; Matt Lauria as Winthrop; Chris Parnell as Dr. Leo Spaceman; Sherri Shepherd as Angie Jordan; Rip Torn as Don Geiss

Episode chronology
| ← Previous "SeinfeldVision" | Next → "The Collection" |
- 30 Rock season 2

"Jack Gets in the Game" is the second episode of NBC's second season of 30 Rock and twenty-third episode overall. It was written by Jon Pollack and directed by one of the season's producers, Don Scardino. It first aired on October 11, 2007 in the United States. Guest stars in this episode include Fajer Al-Kaisi, Will Arnett, Kevin Brown, Grizz Chapman, Marceline Hugot, Matt Lauria, Chris Parnell, Sherri Shepherd and Rip Torn.

In this episode, Devon Banks (Will Arnett) finds out that Jack had a heart attack, which occurred in "Hiatus", and decides to use this to his advantage; Tracy Jordan (Tracy Morgan) is still trying to fix his marriage to Angie Jordan (Sherri Shepherd); and Jenna Maroney (Jane Krakowski) begins to see the positive side of being overweight. This episode received generally positive reviews.

== Plot ==
Jack realizes that his boss Don Geiss (Rip Torn) is hinting that he will retire and believes that he, Jack, is a definite candidate to take over Don's job, as the CEO of General Electric. Jack's only other opposition is Devon, who has returned from the west coast, only now with a fiancée who happens to be Kathy Geiss (Marceline Hugot), Don's daughter. Upon returning, Devon, who is secretly gay, finds out from Kenneth Parcell (Jack McBrayer) about Jack's secret heart attack. At a gathering at Don's house, the pair face off against one another during a game of football. The two mock and try to sabotage each other, before Devon starts to chokes on food, and Jack nearly lets him die before saving him, on the condition he stop sabotaging Jack. As Jack questions his own motives and actions, Geiss tells him that Devon told him about the heart attack, but tells Jack that he is still in good condition, and that Geiss himself will likely retire soon, with Jack being on his shortlist of candidates to run GE.

Tracy is still struggling with his marriage to Angie, who had thrown him out of their family home. Later in this episode, the pair reconcile, but only if Tracy allows for Angie to follow him to make sure that he isn't having an affair.

Jenna becomes attached to her newly gained fat when a mishap during a sketch, on TGS with Tracy Jordan, brings her large amounts of attention from the public. Liz Lemon (Tina Fey) is still re-adjusting to life outside of a relationship. After an argument with Jenna, she decides to move on by finishing building an unassembled desk (which ends up uneven).

== Production ==
The "Me Want Food" T-shirts which Jenna and Liz see in the NBC store, at Rockefeller Center, were made available from the NBC Universal website shortly after the episode aired. Shortly after the episode "MILF Island" aired, similar T-shirts were manufactured, featuring the MILF Island logo.

== Reception ==
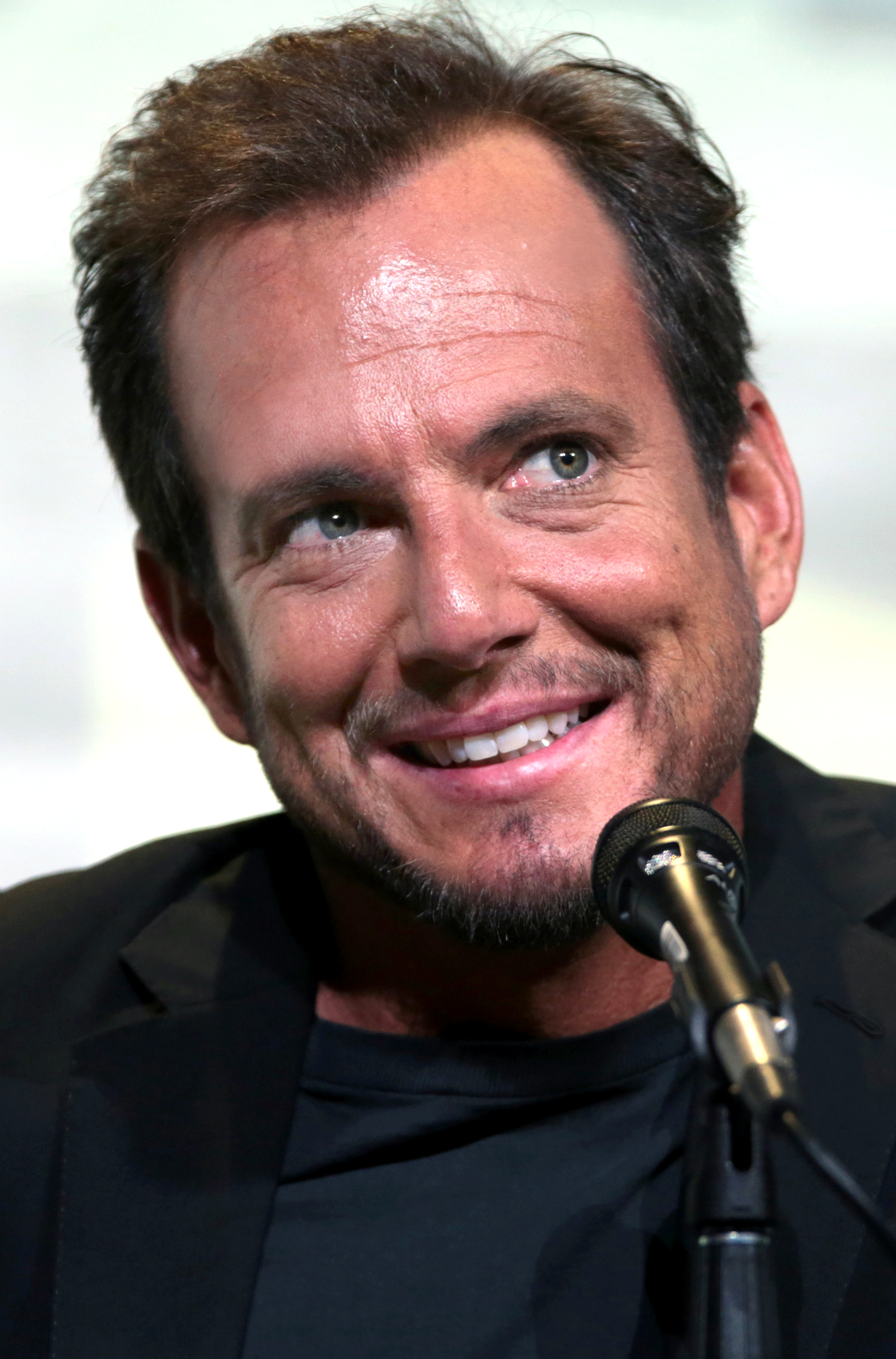
Robert Canning of IGN enjoyed Will Arnett's performance as Devon Banks, in this episode.

"Jack Gets in the Game" brought in an average of 6.6 million American viewers. This episode achieved a 3.0/8 in the key 18–49 demographic, a series high in that category. The 3.0 refers to 3.0% of all 18- to 49-year-olds in the U.S. and the 8 refers to 8% of all 18- to 49-year-olds watching television at the time of the broadcast, in the U.S. This episode was the highest-rated program, in its timeslot, among the men 18–34 demographic.

Robert Canning of IGN thought that this was a "solid episode", and that Will Arnett's character "was even more entertaining in this episode" compared to his appearance in the episode "Fireworks". He added that "there was little to complain about", and rated it 8.9 out of 10. Matt Webb Mitovich of TV Guide said that he "preferred this episode of 30 Rock" compared to the previous episode, "SeinfeldVision". Jeff Labrecque of Entertainment Weekly asked his readers "do you feel like Liz Lemon took a back seat, and if so, did you mind?", adding that "[Alec] Baldwin and [Tracy] Morgan get the laughs, but like the Tracy Jordan Meat Machine [from "The Rural Juror"], 30 Rock requires three distinct flavors. Don't be afraid to sprinkle in the Lemon."

For their work in this episode, Arnett and Rip Torn were nominated for the Primetime Emmy Award for Outstanding Guest Actor in a Comedy Series at the 60th Primetime Emmy Awards.
