= The Collection (30 Rock) =

- 30 Rock episode
- Episode no.: Season 2 Episode 3
- Directed by: Don Scardino
- Written by: Matt Hubbard
- Production code: 203
- Original air date: October 18, 2007

Guest appearances
- Steve Buscemi as Lenny Wosniak; Jackie Mason as himself; Sherri Shepherd as Angie Jordan; Kevin Brown as Dot Com Slattery; Grizz Chapman as Gris Griswold

Episode chronology
← Previous "Jack Gets in the Game"	Next → "Rosemary's Baby"
- 30 Rock season 2

"The Collection" is the third episode of NBC's second season of 30 Rock, and the twenty-fourth episode overall. It was written by producer Matt Hubbard and directed by producer Don Scardino, and first aired on October 18, 2007 in the United States. In the episode, Jack Donaghy (Alec Baldwin) hires a private detective, Len (Steve Buscemi), to investigate his past; Angie Jordan (Sherri Shepherd) asks Liz Lemon (Tina Fey) to help her watch Tracy Jordan (Tracy Morgan); and Kenneth Parcell (Jack McBrayer) attempts to help Jenna Maroney (Jane Krakowski) gain weight by insulting her.

The episode features a reference to Studio 60 on the Sunset Strip, which was compared to 30 Rock because of their similar premise. This is a recurring element in the series, as well as references to other aspects of popular culture. "The Collection" received generally positive reviews, however several critics expressed their concern over the misuse of guest stars, especially in the case of Buscemi. Despite their reactions, Buscemi was nominated for a Primetime Emmy Award for his acting.

== Plot ==
After their separation, Tracy and his wife Angie get back together on the condition that Tracy must never leave her sight. Liz is surprised to find Tracy on time in his dressing room, although Angie confesses that she cannot take care of Tracy alone, and asks for Liz's help. Angie leaves to take care of personal issues, trusting Liz to watch over him. Liz can't keep her promise in controlling Tracy when he leaves for a strip club. When Angie returns, Liz lies about his whereabouts and tries to cover her mistake, however Angie realizes that Tracy has been to a strip club, and blames the situation on Liz. Angie demands that all decisions regarding sketch ideas be run through her first, and rejects all of Liz's ideas. To solve the problem, Liz offers Angie "consultant" credit, but she declines the offer. Liz decides to fight Angie, but Tracy scolds the women for their immature behavior and he reconciles with Angie.

Jack hires Len to investigate his past when he learns that he is a possible candidate for the position of president at G.E.. Knowing that the company is looking for anything that could possibly embarrass them, Jack hires Len to find anything incriminating before the company does. When Len discovers that Jack has a collection of cookie jars, he advises him to get rid of them. Jack cannot bear to destroy his cookie jars, and when he realizes Kenneth has a similar enjoyment, he gives him the collection.

Jenna has become more famous after gaining weight, and sorts through large amounts of fan mail. Jack congratulates her on her weight, and Jenna enjoys her new friendship with him. While talking to Liz, Jenna begins to worry about losing weight, and fears her popularity will decline. Upset that Jenna is losing weight, Jack sends Kenneth to follow her around and make sure she keeps her weight on. Liz tells Kenneth to insult Jenna if he wants her to eat more, and writes down a list of things to say to Jenna to hurt her. Jenna instead becomes aroused by the comments, and tries to seduce Kenneth.

== Production ==
30 Rock and Studio 60 on the Sunset Strip, both of which debuted on 2006–07 NBC lineup, revolved around the off-camera happenings on a sketch comedy series. Evidence of the overlapping subject matter between the shows, as well as the conflict between them, arose when Aaron Sorkin, the creator of Studio 60 on the Sunset Strip, asked Lorne Michaels to allow him to observe Saturday Night Live for a week, a request Michaels denied. Despite this, Sorkin sent Fey flowers after NBC announced it would pick up both series, and wished her luck with 30 Rock. Fey wound up "winning" over Sorkin when Studio 60 on the Sunset Strip was cancelled after one season and 30 Rock was renewed for a second. Although 30 Rock's first season ratings proved lackluster and were lower than those of Studio 60 on the Sunset Strip, the latter was more expensive to produce. The first season episode "Jack the Writer" contained a self-referencing walk and talk sequence, which was commonly used on Studio 60 on the Sunset Strip and Sorkin's previous series. In this episode, the walk and talk sequence is referenced when Liz asks Kenneth, "can you walk and talk?", to which Kenneth replies, "usually, but now you've got me thinking about it".

== Reception ==
"The Collection" brought in an average of 6.2 million American viewers. This episode achieved a 2.6/7 in the key 18–49 demographic; the 2.6 refers to 2.6% of all 18- to 49-year-olds in the U.S., and the 7 refers to 7% of all 18- to 49-year-olds watching television at the time of the broadcast, in the U.S. This was a decrease from the previous episode, which was watched by an average of 6.6 million American viewers. The episode retained 96% of the audience from its lead-in, My Name Is Earl, in adults 18-49, and increased by 14% in adults 18-34 and by 22% among men 18-34.

Bob Sassone of TV Squad said that the lack of the writing staff in the second season was "disappointing". He "love[d] how this show is about NBC and really set at NBC", but was worried about the misuse of guest stars. Robert Canning of IGN said that for the first time, Jenna's storyline was the "most entertaining of the night". He felt that first half of the episode was "tightly written and very funny", but the second half "waned a bit, with less than stellar conclusions to the stories and far less funny bits". Canning said that Jack's storyline was the "most disappointing", and hoped that future guest stars were used properly, rather than for the sake of having a name guest star. George Freitag of BuddyTV said that although Tracy was "not as strong as the previous two episodes", he was "still terrific and the nod to his old SNL skit was a nice touch". He felt that the lack of focus on the personal life of Liz seemed to give the series "a lack of focus". Freitag hoped that her private issues would be further explored, as "her approachable yet successful persona was one of the main draws to the series in the first place". Matt Webb Mitovich of TV Guide felt that the episode "fell a bit flat", and that the season lacked the other TGSers, Lonny, Frank, Twofer [sic] and "director guy". He did not enjoy Jack's storyline, but said that Jenna's storyline "ultimately won a thumbs-up from me for her getting turned on by Kenneth's rudeness".

Steve Buscemi was nominated for the Primetime Emmy Award for Outstanding Guest Actor in a Comedy Series for this episode.
