= Matt Hubbard =

American screenwriter

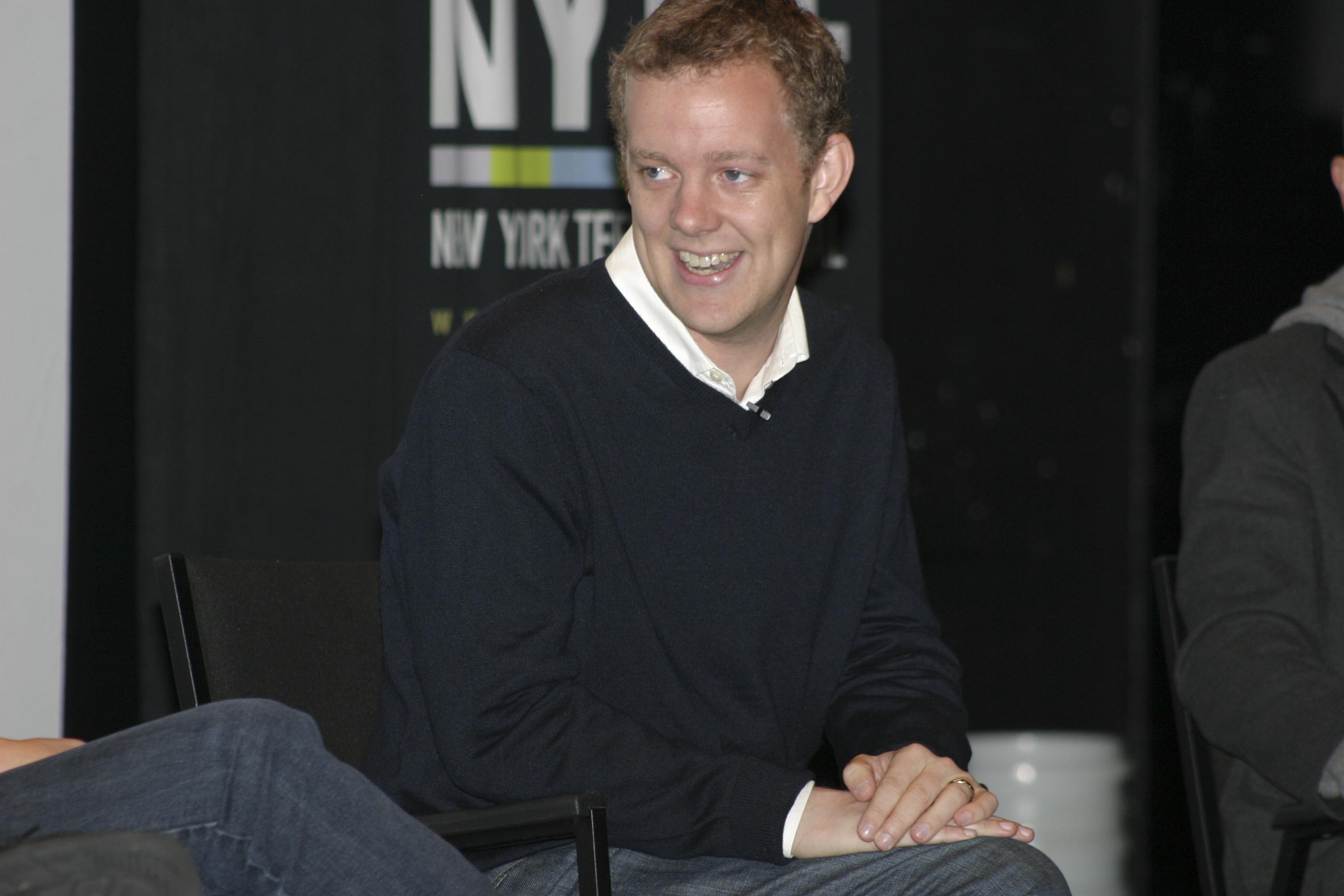
Hubbard at the 2009 New York Television Festival

Matt Hubbard (born July 12, 1978) is an American screenwriter who has worked on many television shows. He graduated from Beverly High School, in Beverly, Massachusetts in 1996. He later went on to attend Harvard University where he was an editor for the Harvard Lampoon. He has worked as a writer on the NBC comedy series 30 Rock. He won Emmy awards in 2009 for both Outstanding Writing for a Comedy Series for writing the episode "Reunion" and for Outstanding Comedy Series as a producer on the series. He worked as a Consulting Producer and writer on the last two seasons of Parks and Recreation.

== Filmography ==
=== Television ===
Year	Title	Credited as		Notes
Year	Title	Writer	Producer	Notes
2000	Ed	Yes	No	
2004	The Stones	Yes	No	Writer (unknown episodes)
2004–2006	Joey	Yes	No	
2005	Avatar: The Last Airbender	Yes	No	Writer (1 episode)
2007–2013	30 Rock	Yes	No	Writer (17 episodes)
2013–2015	Parks and Recreation	Yes	No	Writer (2 episodes)
2015–2017	Superstore	Yes	No	Writer (4 episodes)
2018	Forever	Yes	Yes	Co-creator; writer (3 episodes), teleplay (4 episodes)
2022-present	Loot	Yes	Yes	Co-creator; writer(3 episodes)
