= Goodbye, My Friend =

- 30 Rock episode
- Episode no.: Season 3 Episode 13
- Directed by: John Riggi
- Written by: Ron Weiner
- Production code: 313
- Original air date: March 5, 2009

Guest appearances
- John Lithgow as himself; Patti LuPone as Sylvia Rossitano; Christopher Nicholas Smith as Tim; Phoebe Strole as Becca

Episode chronology
← Previous "Larry King"	Next → "The Funcooker"
- 30 Rock season 3

"Goodbye, My Friend" is the thirteenth episode of the third season of the American television comedy series 30 Rock, and the 49th overall episode of the series. It was written by co-executive producer Ron Weiner and directed by co-executive producer John Riggi. The episode originally aired on NBC in the United States on March 5, 2009. Guest stars in this episode include John Lithgow, Patti LuPone, Christopher Nicholas Smith, and Phoebe Strole.

In the episode, Liz Lemon (Tina Fey) tries to adopt the baby of a pregnant teen (Strole) she meets. Meanwhile, NBC page Kenneth Parcell (Jack McBrayer) learns that Tracy Jordan (Tracy Morgan) has never celebrated his birthday and asks Jenna Maroney (Jane Krakowski) to share her birthday celebration with Tracy. At the same time, Jack Donaghy (Alec Baldwin) goes on a guy's night out with the fictitious show The Girlie Show with Tracy Jordan (TGS) writers—Frank Rossitano (Judah Friedlander), James "Toofer" Spurlock (Keith Powell), J. D. Lutz (John Lutz), and Josh Girard (Lonny Ross).

"Goodbye, My Friend" received mostly positive reviews from television critics. According to the Nielsen Media Research, the episode was watched by 7.3 million households during its original broadcast, and received a 3.8 rating/9 share among viewers in the 18–49 demographic.

== Plot ==
Liz Lemon (Tina Fey) befriends a pregnant teen, Becca (Phoebe Strole). When she sees Becca reading adoption literature and that she is upset with the baby's father, Liz realizes this may be her chance to adopt a baby. Liz creates a job for Becca as the TGS with Tracy Jordan youth consultant. Liz believes that encouraging Becca to follow her dream as a singer will lead her to give up her baby to Liz. However, when Becca's boyfriend, Tim (Christopher Nicholas Smith), comes to the 30 Rock building, Liz realizes that Becca and Tim should be together so that they can raise their child together, and tells them to make their relationship work.

Meanwhile, Jack Donaghy (Alec Baldwin) decides to spend time with the TGS writers, Frank Rossitano (Judah Friedlander), James "Toofer" Spurlock (Keith Powell), J. D. Lutz (John Lutz), and Josh Girard (Lonny Ross). At Jack's home, they watch the movie Harry and the Hendersons. Jack and Frank bond over the fact that they both grew up with deadbeat fathers. Frank admits to Jack that he attended Fordham Law for a semester, but dropped out due to family issues. The next day, Jack decides to help him achieve his dream of becoming a lawyer by getting him a full-ride scholarship to Columbia Law School. In return, Frank invites Jack over for dinner. During dinner, while Frank is out of the room, his mother, Sylvia Rossitano (Patti LuPone), tells Jack that Frank's father is in hiding as he is a lawyer for the mob, and that she does not want her son to follow in those footsteps. For Frank's sake, Jack tells Frank to forget about becoming a lawyer, and to return to being a writer on TGS.

At the same time, Jenna Maroney's (Jane Krakowski) birthday is approaching. NBC page Kenneth Parcell (Jack McBrayer) appeals to Jenna to allow Tracy Jordan's (Tracy Morgan) birthday celebration to be combined with hers, as Tracy has never celebrated a birthday. Jenna dislikes the idea, but plays along. On her birthday, Jenna, upset that no one pays attention to her, decides to fake an injury to get sympathy, to no avail. To get attention, Jenna is seen riding a wheelchair, but this fails, so she gets fed up with everyone. Tracy sees Jenna jumping out of a wheelchair to get attention and tells her that his birthday wish was that she get better, after seeing her wear a back brace at the birthday party.

== Production ==
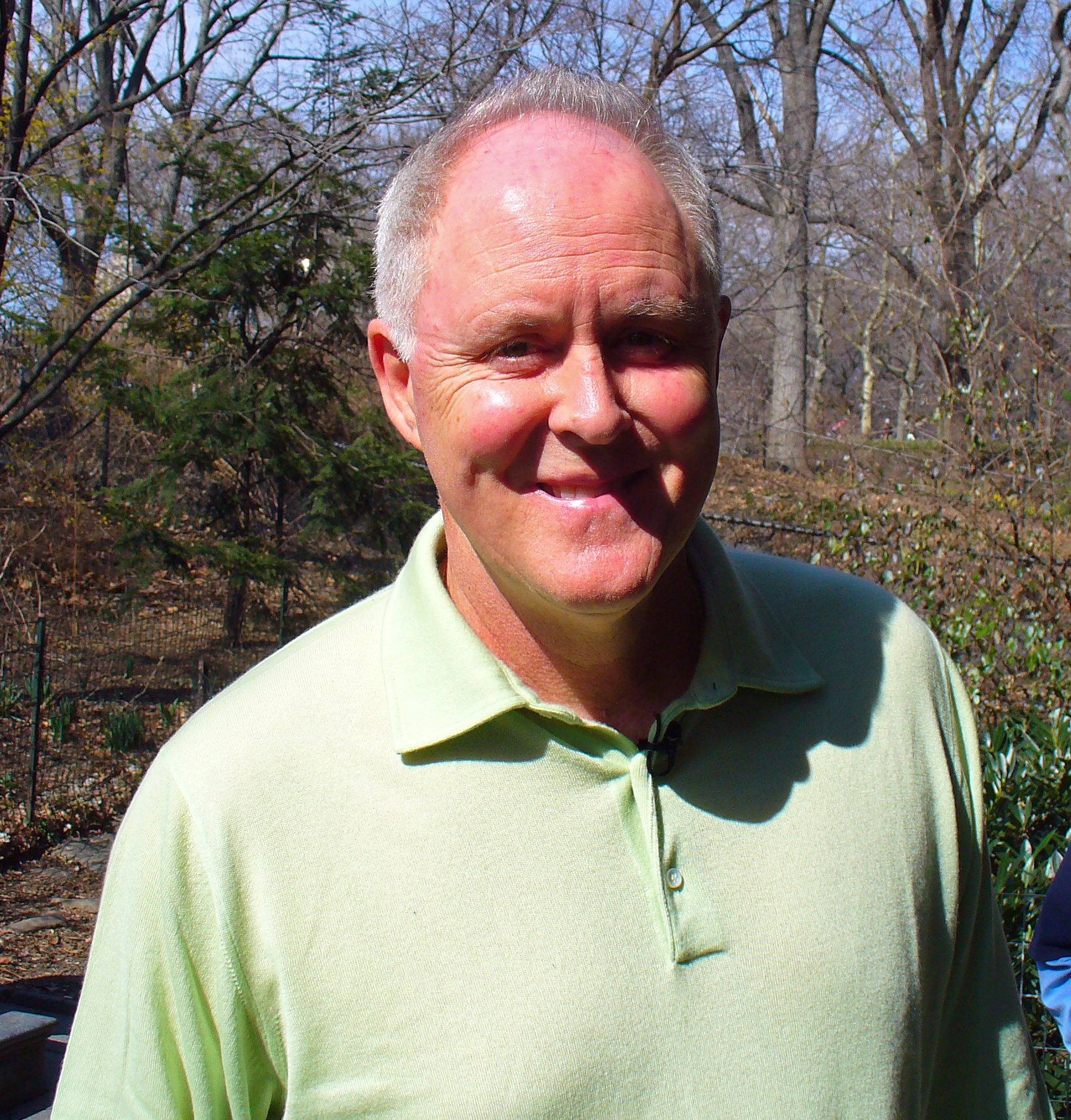
John Lithgow guest starred as himself in this episode.

"Goodbye, My Friend" was written by Ron Weiner and directed by John Riggi, both co-executive producers on 30 Rock. This episode was Weiner's third writing credit, having written the episodes "Secrets and Lies" and "Señor Macho Solo", and this was Riggi's first 30 Rock directed episode. "Goodbye, My Friend" originally aired in the United States on March 5, 2009, on NBC as the thirteenth episode of the show's third season and the 49th overall episode of the series.

According to Judah Friedlander, in the DVD commentary for this episode, he had to cut his hair, when Frank Rossitano gets a make-over, preparing to return to law school. Friedlander revealed that a couple of lines between Frank and Jack Donaghy were cut out from the airing, in which the two are discussing the Western film Shane (1953). Actress Phoebe Strole guest starred in the episode as Becca, a character Liz Lemon befriends. This episode references Liz's desire to become a mother, which began in the show's first season, and continued in this season when she attempts to adopt a child in the season premiere episode "Do-Over".

In January 2009, it was confirmed that singer Patti LuPone would play Frank's mother on 30 Rock, and in this 30 Rock episode, she played Sylvia Rossitano. LuPone later reprised the role in the May 6, 2010, episode "The Moms" for the show's fourth season. During the read-through for "Goodbye, My Friend", series creator, executive producer and lead actress Tina Fey read the part of Frank's mother. According to Friedlander, Fey was "hilarious" during the read-through and "people wanted to put her in a wig so that she would play the part". Actor John Lithgow played himself; throughout this episode he is lost inside the 30 Rock building.

== Cultural references ==
The episode makes repeated references to the 1987 film Harry and the Hendersons, in which actor John Lithgow starred. When Liz sees Lithgow in the 30 Rock building, after he asked her a question, she tells him "Ugh! Fine, Lithgow, I'll do the right thing! God!" to which Lithgow replies "I guess someone's been watching The World According to Garp", a movie that also starred Lithgow. Kenneth says that he saw a birthday party celebrated by prisoners on the television drama Oz. After seeing Becca eating baby food, Liz tells her that the baby cannot taste anything, as it gets its nutrients from its mother, to which Becca says "I am going to post a reply to juno32 and tell her she's a giant ass wipe", a reference to the 2007 comedy-drama Juno in which the title character is faced with an unplanned teenage pregnancy.

== Reception ==
In its original American broadcast, "Goodbye, My Friend" was watched by 7.3 million households, according to the Nielsen Media Research. This episode earned a 3.8 rating/9 share in the 18 and 49 demographic, meaning that 3.8 percent of all people in that group, and 9 percent of all people from that group watching television at the time, watched the episode. This was an increase from the previous episode, "Larry King", which was watched by 6.4 million American viewers.

Entertainment Weekly contributor Annie Barrett enjoyed the episode, and said that Frank and Jack's "Harry and the Hendersons-inspired story line" was the strongest of the episode. Barrett enjoyed Patti Lupone's cameo, but said that John Lithgow's "might have been the most awesome 30 Rock cameo EVER! His aimless wandering [in the 30 Rock building] offered a perfect way to weave the Hendersons element into Liz's baby mama struggles." The A.V. Club's Nathan Rabin said "Goodbye, My Friend" was a "beautiful, elegant bit of plotting, [and] the episode's various threads came together, united by the shining example set forth by [Harry and the Hendersons]." Rabin gave the episode an A−. TV Guide's Matt Mitovich opined that this was a "better show" than the previous episode "Larry King". Bob Sassone of AOL's TV Squad commented that Tina Fey's Liz "was kinda creepy in this episode", regarding her manipulation of Becca, though, "it was very funny all around and that's all that matters".

Television columnist Alan Sepinwall for The Star-Ledger commented that this episode "felt really flat", citing that the plots "were fine, but they needed to be taken further" and that they "were almost there, but needed one more pass through the script." IGN contributor Robert Canning said that his favorite storyline in the episode was Jack and Frank's, and enjoyed Lupone's role, but noted that the episode "lacked that familiar 30 Rock punch and tight rhythm", and gave the episode a 7.8 out 10 rating. Rick Porter of Zap2it said that "Goodbye, My Friend" had its "usual share of brilliantly funny moments, but I'm not sure whether I can fully get behind an episode that hangs an entire subplot on the subtleties of Harry and the Hendersons." He observed that Liz's "baby fever" came out of nowhere, as the show had not referenced Liz's desire of becoming a mother for some time. Porter wrote that Jenna's fake injury was mostly a throwaway, "but it did bring my favorite line of the night", in regards to Tracy explaining that he does not have a birth certificate and therefore has never had a birthday. "I don't need it. I buy myself all the presents I need. And because of my drinking, I'm often surprised."
