= Apollo, Apollo =

- 30 Rock episode
- Episode no.: Season 3 Episode 16
- Directed by: Millicent Shelton
- Written by: Robert Carlock
- Production code: 316
- Original air date: March 26, 2009

Guest appearances
- Adam West as himself; Dean Winters as Dennis Duffy

Episode chronology
← Previous "The Bubble"	Next → "Cutbacks"
- 30 Rock season 3

"Apollo, Apollo" is the sixteenth episode of the third season of American television comedy series 30 Rock, and the 52nd episode of the series overall. It was written by executive producer Robert Carlock and directed by Millicent Shelton. The episode originally aired on NBC in the United States on March 26, 2009. Guest stars in this episode include Adam West and Dean Winters.

The episode is set on the fiftieth birthday of Jack Donaghy (Alec Baldwin), and much of the plot revolves around his concerns with his age and desire to reclaim the happiness of his childhood. At the same time, Liz Lemon (Tina Fey) is forced to deal with her ex-boyfriend Dennis Duffy (Winters) and his self-diagnosis as a sex addict as well as the fact that Dennis slept with her close friend Jenna Maroney (Jane Krakowski). A final plotline in the episode involves the desire of Tracy Jordan (Tracy Morgan) to travel in space, and the efforts by Liz and Jack to deceive him into thinking he has done so.

"Apollo, Apollo" was generally well received by television critics. According to the Nielsen Media Research, the episode was watched by 7.2 million households during its original broadcast. "Apollo, Apollo" was nominated for four Primetime Emmy Awards and won for Outstanding Single-Camera Picture Editing for a Comedy Series. Robert Carlock won the Writers Guild of America Award for Episodic Comedy for his work on this episode.

== Plot ==
The episode begins with an announcement by Tracy Jordan (Tracy Morgan) on television that he plans to travel to outer space, and is willing to pay up to thirty million dollars to do so. Jack Donaghy (Alec Baldwin) agrees to help Tracy with his dream of traveling in space, promising to call his friends at NASA. Instead of doing this, however, he asks The Girlie Show with Tracy Jordan (TGS) producer Pete Hornberger (Scott Adsit) to create a fake space experience for Tracy. Pete and the TGS crew construct a model space shuttle and place Tracy in it after disorienting him by flying him in a helicopter blindfolded. The deception is a success, and Tracy believes that he is, in fact, flying in space.

At the same time, Liz Lemon (Tina Fey) is visited by her ex-boyfriend, Dennis Duffy (Dean Winters), who informs her that he is a sex addict, now atoning for his past errors. Liz is unimpressed and asks Dennis to leave, before going to work. Later, after arriving at work, Liz answers Jenna Maroney's (Jane Krakowski) cellphone, and is surprised to find that Dennis is calling Jenna. Liz pretends to be Jenna and discovers that Jenna and Dennis slept together. Liz is determined not to let this revelation affect her friendship with Jenna, so the two go to confront Dennis about his behavior. During the confrontation, Liz discovers that Jenna and Dennis actually slept together in her bed, leading her to resent Jenna's actions. As a result, she fails to tell Jenna about an improperly attached piece of equipment, leading Jenna to injure her leg.

Meanwhile, Jack's fiftieth birthday is approaching and he has received home movies of some of his earlier birthdays from his mother, Collen Donaghy (Elaine Stritch). While watching the tapes, Jack discovers just how happy he was when he was younger, and is determined to reclaim that happiness and innocence. After examining a list he made while he was younger, he discovers that he has done all of the things but one, befriending Batman. Thus, he arranges for actor Adam West, who played Batman, to come to his birthday party. At the party, however, West calls Jack by the wrong name, leading him to realize that he is in fact unhappy, despite his accomplishments. In an effort to reclaim his happiness, Jack attempts to find the same toy that made him so happy on his tenth birthday, a model of an Apollo Lunar Module. He buys one from a vintage toy store, but still remains unhappy.

Later, Liz apologizes to Jenna for allowing her to be injured, and agrees to let Jenna tell the TGS writing staff about her role in an advertisement for a phone sex line. The writers find the ad online, and greatly enjoy watching it. Jack comes in while the writers are watching and laughs so hard that he vomits. The laughter lifts Jack out of his bad mood, and he tells Liz what an important friend she is.

== Production ==
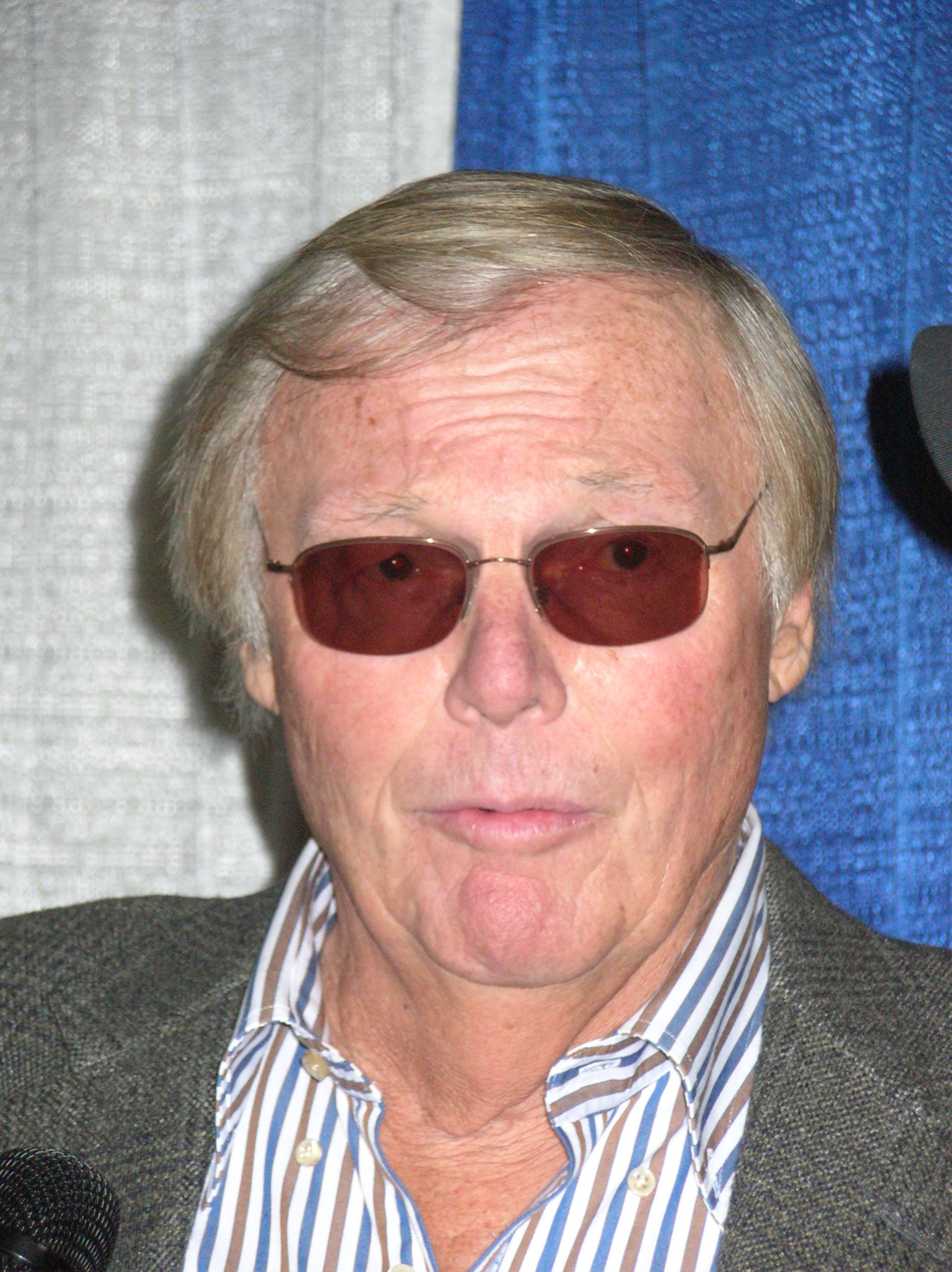
Adam West played himself in this episode.

"Apollo, Apollo" was written by executive producer Robert Carlock, making it his eleventh writing credit after "Jack the Writer", "Jack-Tor", "The Source Awards", "Cleveland", "Jack Gets in the Game", Episode 210, "Subway Hero", "Sandwich Day", "Believe in the Stars", and "Generalissimo". This was Millicent Shelton's first 30 Rock directed episode, and would later return to helm the fourth season episode "Floyd". Shelton had spent two years in negotiations with the show's producers before she was hired to direct this episode. "Apollo, Apollo" originally aired in the United States on March 26, 2009, on NBC as the sixteenth episode of the show's third season and the 52nd overall episode of the series.

In this episode of 30 Rock, actor Dean Winters reprised his role as Dennis Duffy, a former boyfriend of Liz Lemon, for the sixth time, having appeared in "Jack Meets Dennis", "Tracy Does Conan", "The Break-Up", "Subway Hero", and "Cooter". Actor Adam West played himself on the show, in which he introduces Jack Donaghy by the wrong name at Jack's fiftieth birthday party. Liz's phone sex line commercial, the full-length version, is featured on 30 Rock's season three DVD as part of the Bonus features.

In a scene in "Apollo, Apollo", Jack wonders what it would be like to see the world through NBC page Kenneth Parcell's (Jack McBrayer) eyes, revealing that Kenneth sees everyone as Muppets. To accommodate this, Sesame Street puppeteers Joey Mazzarino, Carmen Osbahr, and Matt Vogel were brought in to do the Muppet versions of Jack, Liz, and Tracy Jordan. This angle would later be used again in the show's fourth season episode "Dealbreakers Talk Show" in which Kenneth appears as a muppet while walking by a high-definition camera. In addition, the program was parodied by Sesame Street, in the show's 39th season, entitled "30 Rocks".

Star Wars is frequently referenced in 30 Rock, beginning with the pilot episode in 2006 where Tracy is seen shouting that he is a Jedi. Liz admits to being a huge fan of Star Wars, saying that she had watched it many times with Pete Hornberger, and dressed up as the Star Wars character Princess Leia during four recent Halloweens, and while trying to get out of jury duty in Chicago. Star Wars is also referenced when Tracy takes on the identity of the character Chewbacca. In "Apollo, Apollo", Tracy reveals to Liz and Jack that going into space has been a childhood dream of his, and that when he is there, he would like to kill the Ewok. Tina Fey, the series creator of 30 Rock, a fan of Star Wars herself, said that the weekly Star Wars joke or reference "started happening organically" when the crew realized that they had a Star Wars reference "in almost every show". Fey said that from then on "it became a thing where [they] tried to keep it going", and that even though they could not include one in every episode, they still had a "pretty high batting average". Fey attributed most of the references to Carlock, whom she described as "the resident expert".

== Reception ==
"When things don't work in an episode of 30 Rock, I often write in this space about the balance between the believeable [sic] character moments and the cartoon wackiness (both of which are good things, in balance). 'Apollo, Apollo'—gorgeous title, by the way—not only got it right, it was a kind of direct illustration of [how] it works on this show.

— James Poniewozik, Time

According to the Nielsen Media Research, an average of 7.2 million viewers watched "Apollo, Apollo" during its original United States broadcast, placing it in third place for its timeslot. The show also claimed a 3.4 rating/8 share among viewers aged 18 to 49, meaning that 3.4 percent of all people in that group, and 8 percent of all people from that group watching television at the time, watched the episode. This was an increase from the previous episode, "The Bubble", which was watched by 7 million American viewers.

"Apollo, Apollo" was generally, though not universally, well received among critics. Television columnist Alan Sepinwall for The Star-Ledger wrote that the episode was "easily the best 30 Rock of the season, and one of the series' best episodes to date". He complimented Robert Carlock for "[zooming] in on the narcissistic worldview" of the Dennis character as it "cranked those qualities up to appropriately absurd 30 Rock proportions." In addition, Sepinwall wrote that all of the elements featured in the episode "all came together". Bob Sassone of AOL's TV Squad was similarly laudatory, writing that it was "one of the most explosively hysterical and imaginative half hours of TV this season, and one of this show's best episodes ever". Time contributor James Poniewozik was favorable to the episode, observing that it was "[e]asily the funniest 30 Rock in months, and probably the whole season." Poniewozik said it "nailed it, from the too-many-good-jokes ... to the sweet heart at the center of each character." The A.V. Club's Nathan Rabin enjoyed Adam West's cameo, but noted that Tracy's plot "felt awfully shticky and sitcommy to me." He opined that "Apollo, Apollo" was "pretty great" for Jane Krakowski's Jenna, and in conclusion, Rabin said "I had initially pegged this episode as good but not great and essentially minor in the grand scheme of things but while writing this post I came to realize just how much of it I loved. 30 Rock is pretty great even when it's not that great." Rick Porter, a contributor for Zap2it, said he "loved" the episode, writing that it made "perfect sense" for Kenneth to see everyone around him as muppets, and noted that Liz's commercial was a "strong ending" to the episode.

Margaret Lyons of Entertainment Weekly agreed that the episode was "another solid 30 Rock", but was somewhat less positive, writing that it "didn't quite slay me like the last few episodes have." In addition, Lyons was not thrilled with the Jenna character, reporting "It's been a long time since we've seen Jenna do something redemptive – and I'd settle for anything not strenuously vacant and narcissistic. I get that that's her bit, but ... that note is starting to drive me crazy." IGN contributor Robert Canning also delivered a mixed review of the episode, writing that he laughed "quite a bit" but said it ultimately "felt like it could have been so much more." Canning also concluded his review by stating that it "fell shy of being an absolute classic." Writing for The Palm Beach Post Kevin D. Thompson said "While last night's episode was far from unwatchable, it wasn't one of the show's best, either. But as I've written before, a so-so 30 Rock is still better than 99 percent of TV's other so-called comedies." Thompson noted that he was not thrilled with the return of Dean Winters as Dennis, and called his plot with Liz and Jenna "the show's least interesting plot".

=== Accolades ===
"Apollo, Apollo" received four Primetime Emmy Award nominations, winning one; Millicent Shelton received a nomination for Outstanding Directing for a Comedy Series, Robert Carlock received a nomination for Outstanding Writing for a Comedy Series, Matthew Clark received a nomination for Outstanding Cinematography for a Half-Hour Series nomination, and Ken Eluto won for Outstanding Single-Camera Picture Editing for a Comedy Series at the 61st Primetime Emmy Awards.

At the February 2010 ceremony for the Writers Guild of America Awards, Carlock won for Episodic Comedy, tieing with Modern Family's Steven Levitan and Christopher Lloyd for their work on the pilot episode. Eluto garnered the American Cinema Editors "Eddie" Award for Best Edited Half-Hour Series for Television. In addition, "Apollo, Apollo" was nominated for the ADG Excellence in Production Design Award for Half Hour Single-Camera Television Series.
