= The Bubble (30 Rock) =

- 30 Rock episode
- Episode no.: Season 3 Episode 15
- Directed by: Tricia Brock
- Written by: Tina Fey
- Production code: 315
- Original air date: March 19, 2009

Guest appearances
- Jon Hamm as Drew Baird; Calvin Klein as himself; Bobb'e J. Thompson as Tracy Jr.; Meredith Vieira as herself; Godfrey as Rick

Episode chronology
| ← Previous "The Funcooker" | Next → "Apollo, Apollo" |
- 30 Rock season 3

"The Bubble" is the fifteenth episode of the third season of the American television series 30 Rock. It was written by series' creator Tina Fey and directed by Tricia Brock. The episode originally aired on NBC in the United States on March 19, 2009. Jon Hamm and Bobb'e J. Thompson guest star in this episode, and there are cameo appearances by Calvin Klein and Meredith Vieira.

In the episode, Liz Lemon (Fey) discovers that her boyfriend Drew (Hamm) lives in a "bubble" because of his good looks, and has never experienced many of the unpleasant phenomena in life. At the same time, Tracy Jordan (Tracy Morgan) decides to leave the fictitious sketch comedy show The Girlie Show with Tracy Jordan (TGS) because he no longer needs the money, and Jenna Maroney (Jane Krakowski) decides to cut her hair as a publicity stunt.

"The Bubble" received generally positive reviews. According to the Nielsen ratings system, it was watched by 7 million households during its original broadcast. For their performances in this episode, Hamm and Jack McBrayer – the latter playing Kenneth Parcell – received Primetime Emmy Award nominations in the categories for Outstanding Guest Actor in a Comedy Series and Outstanding Supporting Actor in a Comedy Series, respectively.

== Plot ==
The episode begins with Liz Lemon (Tina Fey) noticing that people treat her boyfriend, Drew Baird (Jon Hamm), differently because of his good looks. After watching a traffic cop, (Frank Ridley) rip up a ticket for Drew, and fashion designer Calvin Klein offering him a job as an underwear model, Liz brings the matter up with her boss, Jack Donaghy (Alec Baldwin), who tells her that Drew is in "the bubble". Jack tells Liz that she should stay with Drew and enjoy the perks of the bubble, but Liz begins to realize that living in the bubble has left Drew without some essential skills. After discovering that Drew cannot perform the Heimlich maneuver, even though he is a doctor, and cannot play tennis, despite the fact that he worked as a tennis coach, Liz decides that she has to leave Drew, and ends their relationship.

Meanwhile, at TGS, it is time to renew Tracy Jordan's (Tracy Morgan) contract, and Jack decides to approach the matter carefully as Tracy does not need the money he makes on the show. While negotiating Tracy's new contract, Jack mentions this fact, which comes as a shock to Tracy, who had never realized that he could survive financially without the income. After realizing that Tracy has quit the show, Jack must find a way to bring him back, after Tracy's son, Tracy Jr. (Bobb'e J. Thompson), complains to Jack about how unbearable his father is to have around the house. Meanwhile, in order to get attention for herself, Jenna Maroney (Jane Krakowski) decides to cut her hair for charity as a publicity stunt. Jenna makes an appearance on NBC's Today Show, where her haircut will be broadcast. Meredith Vieira asks Jenna's opinion on the news that Tracy has left TGS. At learning this, Jenna bails out on her haircut.

After discovering that Tracy is still in contact with NBC page Kenneth Parcell (Jack McBrayer), Jack realizes that their relationship is the key to bringing Tracy back to TGS. Jack, therefore, orders Kenneth to break off all contact with Tracy, although this fails because of Kenneth's relationship with Tracy. Seeing an opportunity, Jack states that since Kenneth's duties were primarily taking care of Tracy, and Tracy no longer works at NBC, Kenneth is no longer needed. Not wanting Kenneth to lose his job, Tracy agrees to return on the stipulation that Kenneth keeps his job.

== Production ==
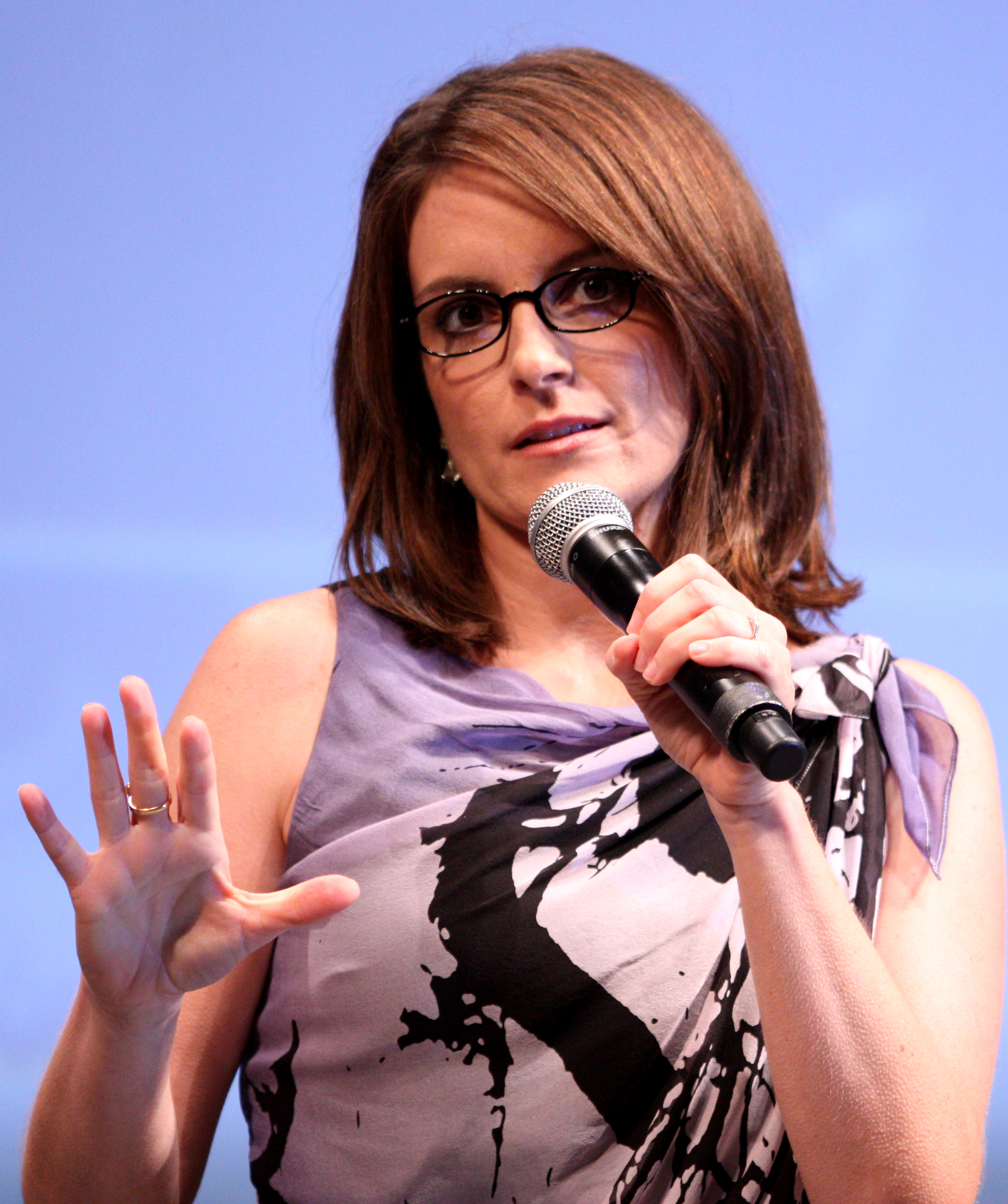
Series creator Tina Fey believed that there was no possibility of getting Jon Hamm to guest star on the show.

"The Bubble" was written by series creator, executive producer and lead actress Tina Fey. The director of this episode was Tricia Brock. This was Fey's sixteenth writing credit, and Brock's first directed episode. "The Bubble" originally aired on NBC in the United States on March 19, 2009.

When actor Jon Hamm hosted the sketch comedy show Saturday Night Live (SNL) in October 2008, negotiations took place with the show's producers for him to guest star on 30 Rock. In December 2008, it was confirmed Hamm would appear as a love interest for Fey's character, Liz Lemon. It was also announced by NBC that Hamm would star in a three-episode arc; he made his debut in the February 5, 2009, episode "Generalissimo", and made a second appearance in "St. Valentine's Day". "The Bubble" was the completion of Hamm's three episode arc, though Hamm made appearances on the show's fourth season episodes "Anna Howard Shaw Day" and "Emanuelle Goes to Dinosaur Land".

In an interview with Entertainment Weekly, Fey said that when the writing staff is developing a script, "We'll have an actor in mind and we'll keep referring to them. Like for this we said, 'Then Hamm comes in, blah blah blah.'" She believed that there was no possibility of getting Hamm though: "we were lucky with the timing because Mad Men was on hiatus and he was hosting SNL. So I called over there and asked them [whispering], 'Hey, is that guy funny? Tell me the truth.' And they were like, 'Yes, he's really funny.' By Saturday I knew they were right."

All of Liz and Drew's scenes were filmed on January 15, 2009, on the Upper West Side. Fashion designer Calvin Klein, playing himself, made a cameo in this episode. Klein is the father of Marci Klein, an executive producer on 30 Rock. This episode was actor Bobb'e J. Thompson's second appearance as Tracy's son, Tracy Jr., on the show. Thompson first guest starred in the episode "Gavin Volure". "The Bubble" was Today show co-host Meredith Vieira's third guest appearance as herself, having appeared in the episodes "Greenzo" and "Larry King".

== Cultural references ==
After Kenneth buys Tracy's food, Tracy calls Kenneth his Radar O'Reilly, a character from M*A*S*H. He also tells him, "Now get in here and rub my feet until you hear a chopper coming." Drew tells Liz that Prince Eric was based on pictures of him in his younger days, a reference to the animated character from the movie The Little Mermaid (1989). Jenna talks about the Rachel haircut, made famous by actress Jennifer Aniston, as the character Rachel Green on the show Friends. Later, Jenna says she does not want to make the wrong choice with her hair explaining she does not want to end up like actress Keri Russell from Felicity season two.

During an attempt to get Tracy to return to the show by having an employee imitate Bill Cosby, Tracy yells "You’ve got a lot of nerve getting on the phone with me after what you did to my Aunt Paulette!". Show Runner Robert Carlock confirmed this to be a reference to Cosby's sexual assault allegations.

Kenneth tells Jack that when he and Tracy watch the show Lost he always holds Tracy's hand, due to the show's mysterious plots. After learning that Tracy has quit the show, Liz mocks Jack, in a deep voice, saying "Be a manager. Control your people. Buy better clothes." Jack explains his plans to her on how he will get Tracy to return, with Liz once again mocking Jack, this time in a deep raspy voice, "Just get it done. Nope. I lost it. That was Batman", a reference to actor Christian Bale's voice as the superhero in the Batman films.

During the scenes where Liz and Drew are together, the music piece "Theme from A Summer Place" is played.

== Reception ==
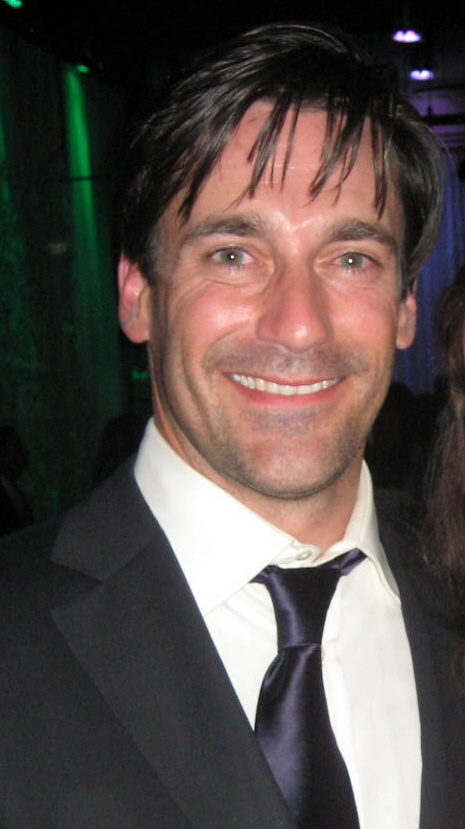
Jon Hamm received an Emmy nomination for Outstanding Guest Actor in a Comedy Series for his performance in this episode.

According to the Nielsen ratings system, an average of 7 million viewers watched "The Bubble" during its original United States broadcast, placing it in fourth place for its timeslot. The show also claimed a share of 3.2/8 among viewers aged 18 to 49, meaning that 3.2% of all people in that group, and 8% of all people from that group watching television at the time, watched the episode. For their performances in this episode, Jon Hamm and Jack McBrayer received Primetime Emmy Award nominations for Outstanding Guest Actor in a Comedy Series and Outstanding Supporting Actor in a Comedy Series, respectively.

The episode received generally positive reviews, although most reviewers found some of the storylines more effective than others. Robert Canning of IGN wrote that "the main portion of this episode was quite funny, even if the ending lacked bite." Similarly, Margaret Lyons of Entertainment Weekly found that the episode was "another strong showing for 30 Rock ... although Jenna's plotline was pretty tired." TV Squad's Bob Sassone was similarly positive about "The Bubble", calling it "another good episode." James Poniewozik of Time, also responded favorably to the episode with the exception of the Jenna storyline, writing that it "was the first one in a long time that I enjoyed almost completely without reservation (Jenna's subplot was off, but it was barely a blip)." Television columnist Alan Sepinwall for The Star-Ledger disliked the bubble concept, reporting, "[t]he idea that attractive people get away with things that the more average-looking can't is an old joke, even on 30 Rock (with Cerie)", but nonetheless enjoyed the "variations" of the joke saying they were "well-conceived". Sepinwall concluded, "this was one of the funniest 30 Rock's of the season. Zap2it's Rick Porter was also favorable to "The Bubble" in his recap, opining that 30 Rock "gave us a very well-done episode". As with Lyons and Poniewozik, Porter felt Jenna's story "didn't really click", but liked the scene with Jenna and her stylist team firing off words to describe Jenna's beauty as "scathingly funny."

The A.V. Club's Nathan Rabin enjoyed Hamm's role as Drew, reporting that his character "initially seemed too good to be true but the show gradually revealed him to be imperfect and even fucked up enough to be plausible. [...] The Hamm subplot was very funny and well-executed". Sepinwall also praised Hamm, writing, "Finally! It took three episodes ... but Tina Fey (who wrote this one) let Jon Hamm be funny on his way out the door."

Not all reviews were positive. Matt Mitovich of TV Guide wrote, "I must be honest ... This A-story was ridiculous, and not in the hysterical way. When I first read the logline about Drew 'getting by on his good looks,' I thought we'd witness the occasional favoritism. But horrid doctor skills and flailing at the very public sport of tennis, and his obliviousness to it all? Hamm got a turkey of an exit story, sorry."
