= Gavin Volure =

- 30 Rock episode
- Episode no.: Season 3 Episode 4
- Directed by: Gail Mancuso
- Written by: John Riggi
- Production code: 304
- Original air date: November 20, 2008

Guest appearances
- John McEnroe as himself; Steve Martin as Gavin Volure; Bobb'e J. Thompson as Tracy Jr.

Episode chronology
← Previous "The One with the Cast of Night Court"	Next → "Reunion"
- 30 Rock season 3

"Gavin Volure" is the fourth episode of the third season of the American television comedy series 30 Rock, and the 40th overall episode of the series. It was written by co-executive producer John Riggi and directed by Gail Mancuso. The episode originally aired on NBC in the United States on November 20, 2008. Guest stars in this episode include John McEnroe, Steve Martin, and Bobb'e J. Thompson.

In the episode, Liz Lemon (Tina Fey) meets one of her boss's, Jack Donaghy's (Alec Baldwin), friends, Gavin Volure (Martin), when the pair attend a dinner party. Gavin, after offering Jack a secret business opportunity, becomes enamored of Liz. Jack encourages the relationship until he discovers Gavin is not as successful as he claimed. Also, NBC page Kenneth Parcell (Jack McBrayer) invests his money in Gavin's business. Meanwhile, Tracy Jordan (Tracy Morgan) fears that his sons are trying to kill him.

"Gavin Volure" received generally good reception from television critics. According to the Nielsen Media Research, it was watched by 7.1 million households during its original broadcast. For his performance in this episode, Martin received a Primetime Emmy Award nomination in the category for Outstanding Guest Actor in a Comedy Series.

== Plot ==
Jack Donaghy (Alec Baldwin) brings Liz Lemon (Tina Fey) along to a dinner party hosted by his friend Gavin Volure (Steve Martin). Gavin becomes intrigued by Liz and invites her to spend the weekend with him, which she accepts. She wonders how the relationship between them will work, as he is agoraphobic. Gavin explains his daily routines to Liz, and also discloses that due to his phobias, he cannot be intimate with women. Liz starts to think that maybe a relationship with Gavin could work. As Liz gets ready to leave, Gavin admits to her that he is not agoraphobic, and that he is under house arrest for arson, fraud, embezzlement, and racketeering. This shocks Liz, and when she returns to New York, she tells Jack about it. Jack feels awful for investing NBC page Kenneth Parcell's (Jack McBrayer) money with Gavin, after Gavin told him he was forming a new company and interested Jack to be part of it. Later, Gavin escapes from house arrest and shows up at the 30 Rock studios. There, he tells Liz that he was on his way to the Canada–US border but came back to bring her with him. After Liz refuses to go with him, and not wanting to go to prison, Gavin climbs to the top of the TGS with Tracy Jordan set and threatens to jump. Jack tries to talk Gavin out of jumping, distracting him in the process, resulting in Tracy Jordan (Tracy Morgan) tackling Gavin down.

Meanwhile, Tracy begins to question the reason why his sons want to spend so much time with him. One day, Tracy sees a special about Lyle and Erik Menendez—the two brothers who became famous for killing their parents—which leads him to believe that his sons are plotting to kill him. As a result, Tracy buys a life-size Japanese sex doll that looks like him to use as a decoy to fool them. Eventually, Tracy realizes that he overreacted with his sons but warns his son, Tracy Jr. (Bobb'e J. Thompson), that if he were to die, that he and his brother will face jail time.

== Production ==
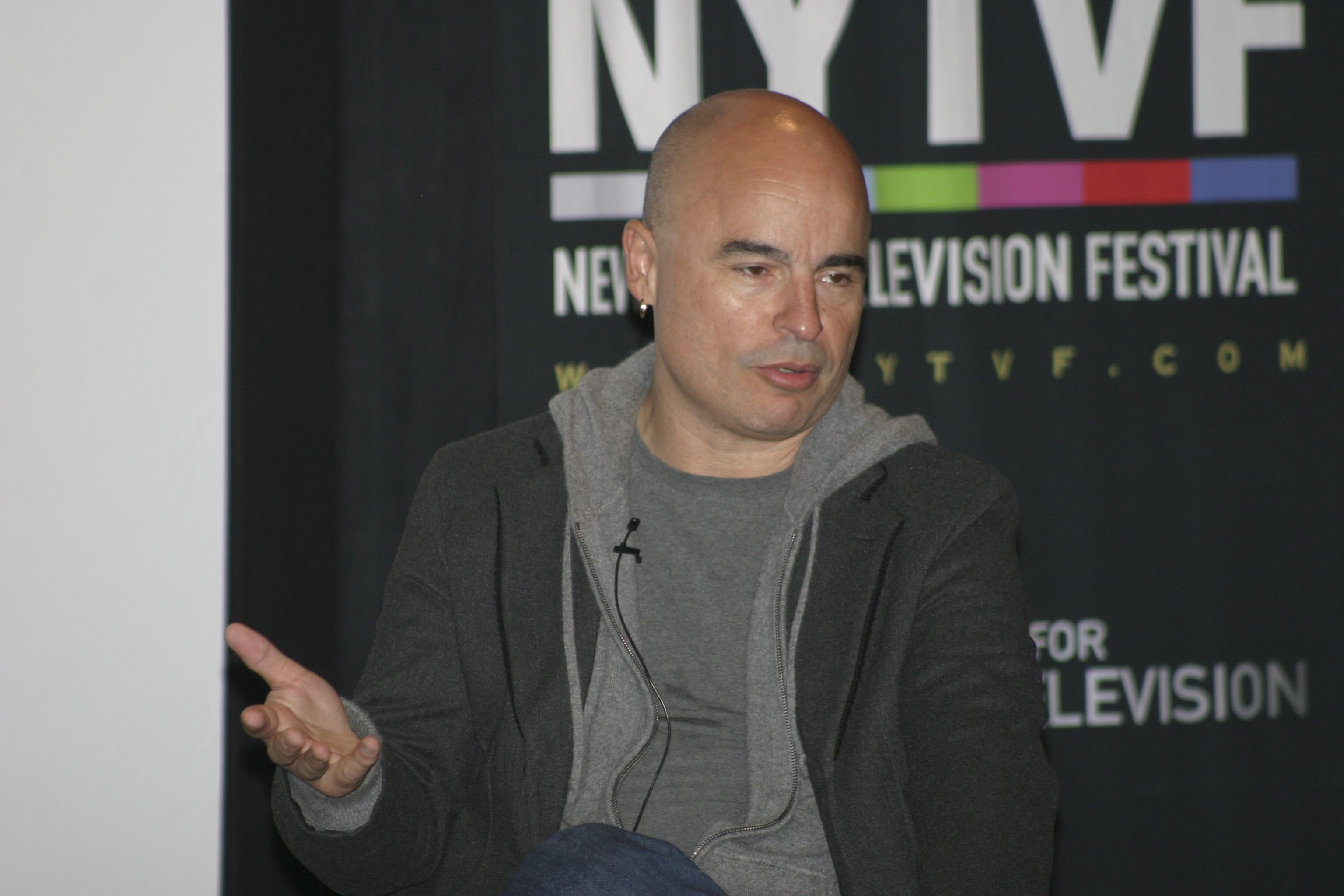
"Gavin Volure" was written by co-executive producer John Riggi (pictured).

"Gavin Volure" was written by co-executive producer John Riggi, making it his sixth writing credit after "Blind Date", "The Head and the Hair", "Corporate Crush", "Cougars", and "Succession". The episode was directed by Gail Mancuso, making it her fifth for the series. "Gavin Volure" originally aired on November 20, 2008, on NBC in the United States as the fourth episode of the show's third season and the 40th overall episode of the series.

In September 2008, it was announced that comedian actor Steve Martin would guest star on 30 Rock. He played the titular character of this episode. Martin and series creator Tina Fey starred in the 2008 comedy movie Baby Mama. In the episode, stock footage of the Arkansas Governor's Mansion was used for exterior shots of the home of Gavin Volure. This episode was actor Bobb'e J. Thompson's first appearance as Tracy Jordan's son, Tracy Jr., on the show. He later guest starred in the episodes "The Bubble" and "Sun Tea". Former professional tennis player John McEnroe played himself in this episode as he is a guest at Gavin's dinner party, and represents art collecting and yelling. McEnroe first appeared in the January 18, 2007, 30 Rock episode "The Head and the Hair" as the host of a game show.

Two filmed scenes from "Gavin Volure" were cut out from the airing. Instead, the scenes were featured on 30 Rock's season three DVD as part of the deleted scenes in the Bonus feature. In the first scene, Jack Donaghy, in a voice over, talks about the Edison Terrace—located in the rooftop gardens of the General Electric Building. "It's a private rooftop garden reserved for the CEOs of this company. The inner temple of American business. The only outsider ever admitted is a mute cleaning lady who has never laid with a man." The scene features six men, including fictional CEO of General Electric on the show, Don Geiss (Rip Torn). In the second scene, Jenna Maroney's (Jane Krakowski) intern (Liz Holtan) is excited to work with her and tells her that she wants to be just like her. Jenna believes the intern wants to become an actress, prompting her to pull the intern's earring off. The latter scene was included in the October 15, 2009, 30 Rock episode "Season 4".

== Reception ==
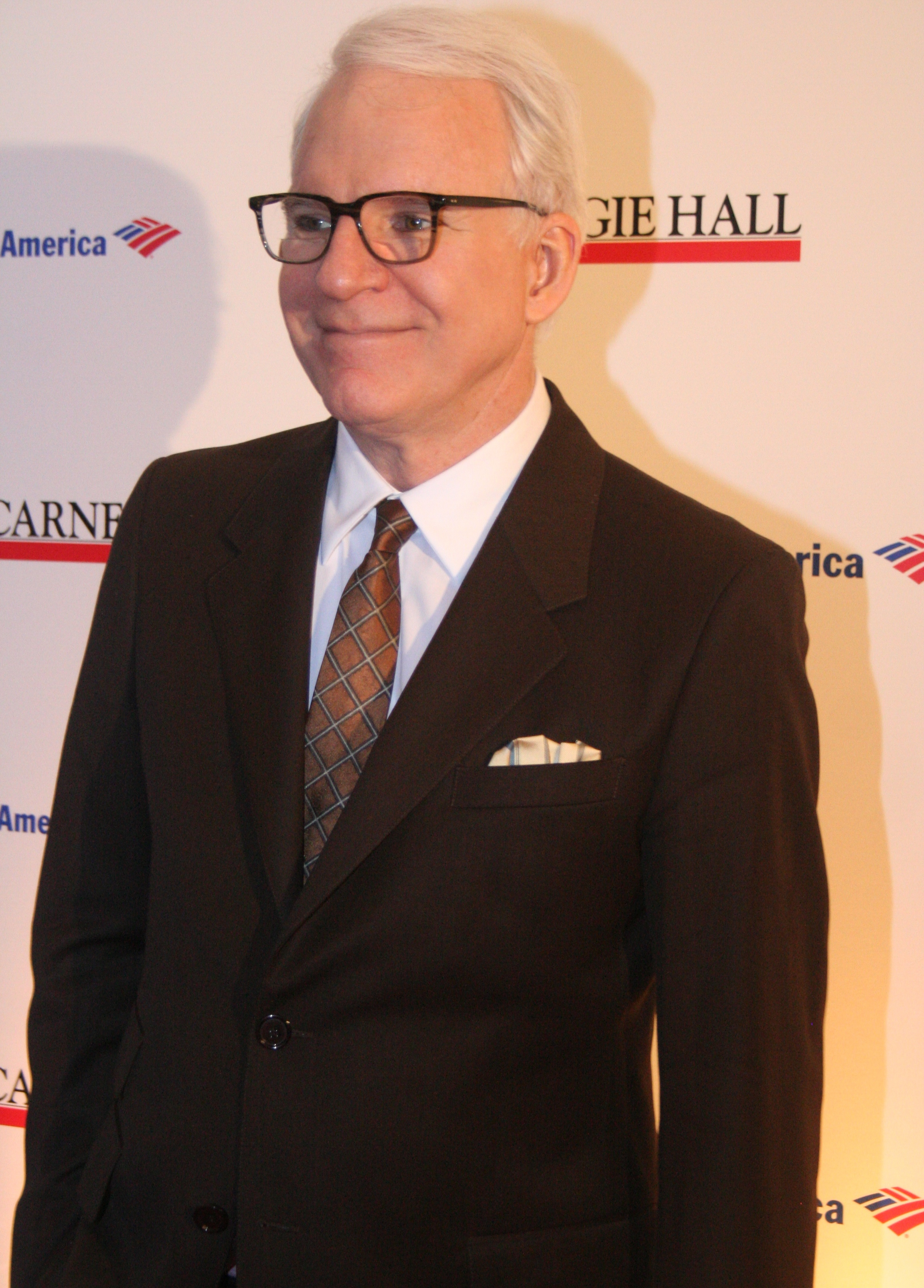
Steve Martin received a nomination for the Primetime Emmy Award for Outstanding Guest Actor in a Comedy Series for his performance in this episode

According to the Nielsen Media Research, "Gavin Volure" was watched by 7.1 million households in its original American broadcast. It earned a 3.4 rating/8 share in the 18–49 demographic. This means that it was seen by 3.4 percent of all 18- to 49-year-olds, and 8 percent of all 18- to 49-year-olds watching television at the time of the broadcast. This episode ranked number one among the broadcast networks in men aged 18–34, tied with Grey's Anatomy's "In the Midnight Hour", and number two in adults 18–34. However, this was a decrease from the previous episode, "The One with the Cast of Night Court", which was watched by 7.5 million American viewers. Steve Martin received a Primetime Emmy Award nomination for Outstanding Guest Actor in a Comedy Series at the 61st Primetime Emmy Awards for his work in this episode, but lost it to singer-songwriter Justin Timberlake for hosting Saturday Night Live.

Since airing, "Gavin Volure" has received good reception amongst television critics. TV Guide's Matt Mitovich praised "Gavin Volure", citing that it was a "funny episode" and said that Martin was a "pretty good fit on 30 Rock. He plays the zany and off-kilter so well." IGN contributor Robert Canning said the episode was "funny" and as with Mitovich, believed that Martin was a "perfect fit for Gavin, playing him both as the suave sophisticate we first meet and the screwy, on-the-run Gavin that ends the episode." Canning enjoyed Tracy's plot and gave this episode an 8.9 out of 10 rating. Bob Sassone of AOL's TV Squad was complimentary towards Martin's appearance, writing that he and season two guest stars Jerry Seinfeld and Carrie Fisher "belong in the 30 Rock world, and Martin is quietly funny as the agoraphobic ... rich ... friend of Jack's who likes Liz". Entertainment Weekly's Jeff Labrecque commented that Tracy's story was the "weaker subplot", but was favorable to Tina Fey and Martin, opining they "speak the same language", and he would not mind seeing the Gavin character back. The A.V. Club's Nathan Rabin enjoyed Kenneth in the episode, citing that he was "hilarious", and in regards to the episode itself, Rabin said that it "wasn't one of the all-time greats but it brought the funny at a rapid clip". In conclusion, Rabin gave the episode a B+.

Not all reviews were positive. Television columnist Alan Sepinwall for The Star-Ledger noted that "Gavin Volure" was "one of the weakest 30 Rock episodes ever". He explained that he was "flummoxed" that this episode featuring Alec Baldwin, Fey, and Martin "together only made me laugh once, and not at any of them."
