= 30 Rock season 3 =

Season of television series

30 Rock
- Season 3
- DVD cover
- Starring: Tina Fey; Tracy Morgan; Jane Krakowski; Jack McBrayer; Scott Adsit; Judah Friedlander; Alec Baldwin; Katrina Bowden; Kevin Brown; Grizz Chapman; Maulik Pancholy; Keith Powell; Lonny Ross
- No. of episodes: 22

Release
- Original network: NBC
- Original release: October 30, 2008 – May 14, 2009

Season chronology
- ← Previous; Season 2 Next → Season 4

The third season of 30 Rock, an American television comedy series, consists of 22 episodes that aired from October 30, 2008 to May 14, 2009 on the NBC network in the United States. The show follows Tina Fey, Tracy Morgan, Alec Baldwin, Jane Krakowski, and others as they produce a fictitious live sketch comedy television series TGS. Salma Hayek and Jon Hamm make recurring guest appearances as love interests. The season was produced by Broadway Video, Little Stranger, and NBC Universal; the executive producers were series creator Fey, Lorne Michaels, Marci Klein, David Miner, and Robert Carlock.

In this season, Liz Lemon (Fey) focuses on her personal life, trying to adopt a child and find a new romantic partner. Meanwhile, Jack Donaghy (Baldwin) pursues a new relationship, Jenna Maroney (Krakowski) undertakes a new Janis Joplin-based film project, and Tracy Jordan (Morgan) enjoys the success of his video game developed at the end of the previous season.

The third season aired under NBC's promotional banner "Comedy Night Done Right" on Thursdays at 9:30 p.m. Eastern Time. The season was critically acclaimed and received 22 nominations at the Primetime Emmy Awards, the most for a single show in 2009. The season broke 30 Rock's own record of 17 nominations for the most nominated comedy season at the Primetime Emmys. The season was released on DVD as a three-disc boxed set under the title 30 Rock: Season 3 on September 22, 2009, by Universal Studios.

== Synopsis ==
Season 3 continues from the epilogue of the Season 2 finale, "Cooter". Jack returns to NBC, Liz tries to adopt a baby, Tracy enjoys the success of his pornographic video game, and Jenna sues Tracy for not properly compensating her. Season-long plots include Jack meeting a new love interest, Elisa (Salma Hayek), and the search for his real father (Alan Alda). Liz also finds a new love interest, Dr. Drew Baird (Jon Hamm), while going through cutbacks and discovering her potential to host a talk show. Jenna is cast as a Janis Joplin-type character in a biographical film that could not obtain the life rights to Janis Joplin.

== Cast and characters ==
Ten actors received star billing. Tina Fey portrayed Liz Lemon, the head writer of a fictitious live-sketch-comedy television series TGS. The TGS cast consists of three actors. The lead actor is the loose cannon movie star Tracy Jordan, portrayed by Tracy Morgan. His co-stars are the dense Jenna Maroney, portrayed by Jane Krakowski, and Josh Girard, who is also a writer for TGS, portrayed by Lonny Ross. Ross's role in the show was substantially reduced this season, appearing in only four episodes as the character Josh is dismissed by his coworkers as "forgettable". Behind the scenes of TGS, Alec Baldwin played the NBC network executive Jack Donaghy and Jack McBrayer played the naïve NBC page Kenneth Parcell. Scott Adsit acted as the TGS producer Pete Hornberger. In the fictional writers' room, Judah Friedlander portrayed trucker hat-wearing staff writer Frank Rossitano, Keith Powell played the Harvard University alumnus and TGS staff writer James "Toofer" Spurlock, and Katrina Bowden acted as writers' assistant Cerie Xerox. Other cast members include Maulik Pancholy as Jonathan, Grizz Chapman as Grizz Griswold, and Kevin Brown as "Dot Com" Slattery. The cast featured recurring characters, including John Lutz as J.D. Lutz, and Chris Parnell as Dr. Leo Spaceman.

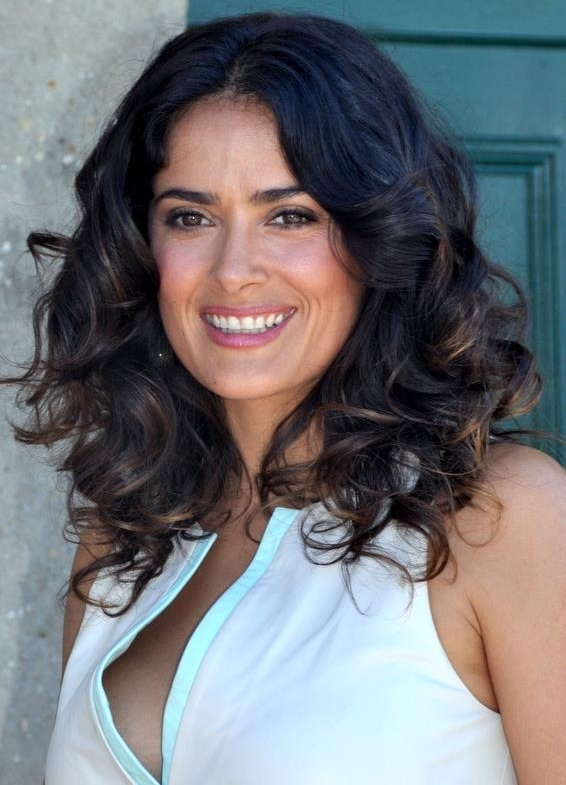
Salma Hayek appeared in six episodes as Jack's mother's nurse, Elisa Pedriera

Salma Hayek had a recurring guest appearance in six episodes as Elisa, a nurse for Jack Donaghy's mother and Donaghy's eventual love interest. She first appeared in "Señor Macho Solo" and made her final appearance in "The Ones". TV critic Alan Sepinwall praised the show for finding the "comic potential" in Hayek, rather than casting her as "The Beautiful Woman Who the Funny Character is Lusting After," his characterization of her previous limited appearances in comedies. Steve Buscemi appeared in the episodes "The Natural Order" and "Mamma Mia" as Lenny Wosniak, a private detective occasionally hired by Donaghy. Alan Alda appeared in the episodes "Mamma Mia" and "Kidney Now!" as Milton Greene, a man believed to be Jack Donaghy's father. Jon Hamm also appears for a brief romance with Liz, which has a one-episode follow-up in season 4. Tina Fey said that, during casting, she asked Lorne Michaels whether Hamm was funny, and whether he was "a dick", before offering him the role.

Cameo appearances include Jennifer Aniston, Steve Martin, Megan Mullally, Peter Dinklage, and Oprah Winfrey. News articles announcing Aniston's appearance described 30 Rock as "a haven for guest appearances from big names in entertainment" due to its setting in the entertainment industry. The show's creators solicit guest appearances for particular storylines. Celebrity cameos have been described as a promotional marketing strategy for the show. Writing for The Daily News, Christina Kinon argues that the show succeeded in attracting cameos because they are also rewarding for the guest stars: seven of the guest stars in season two were nominated for Emmy Awards, and the show's humor gives serious stars a chance to be self-deprecating and "hip". Aniston's cameo episode, "The One with the Cast of Night Court", pokes fun at the show's use of cameos by using the title to reference Aniston's series Friends (which had recently concluded) while focusing the plot around the fact that it also starred the cast of 1980s sitcom Night Court.

=== Main cast ===
- Tina Fey as Liz Lemon, the head writer of TGS, a live sketch comedy television show.
- Tracy Morgan as Tracy Jordan, a loose cannon movie star and cast member of TGS.
- Jane Krakowski as Jenna Maroney, a vain, fame-obsessed TGS cast member and Liz's best friend.
- Jack McBrayer as Kenneth Parcell, a naïve, television-loving NBC page from Georgia.
- Scott Adsit as Pete Hornberger, the witty and wise producer of TGS.
- Judah Friedlander as Frank Rossitano, an immature staff writer for TGS.
- Alec Baldwin as Jack Donaghy, a high-flying NBC network executive and Liz's mentor.
- Katrina Bowden as Cerie Xerox, the young, attractive TGS general assistant.
- Keith Powell as James "Toofer" Spurlock, a proud African-American staff writer for TGS.
- Lonny Ross as Josh Girard, a young, unintelligent TGS cast member.
- Kevin Brown as Walter "Dot Com" Slattery, a member of Tracy's entourage.
- Grizz Chapman as Warren "Grizz" Griswold, a member of Tracy's entourage.
- Maulik Pancholy as Jonathan, Jack's assistant who is obsessed with him.

=== Recurring cast ===
- John Lutz as J.D. Lutz, a lazy, overweight TGS writer who is often ridiculed by his co-workers.
- Salma Hayek as Elisa Pedreira, a Puerto Rican nurse and Jack's love interest.
- Chris Parnell as Dr. Leo Spaceman, a physician who practices questionable medical techniques.
- Todd Buonopane as Jeffrey Weinerslav, an employee in General Electric's human resources department.
- Jon Hamm as Dr. Andrew "Drew" Baird, a pediatrician and Liz's neighbor who she takes a romantic interest in.
- Elaine Stritch as Colleen Donaghy, Jack's cold and overbearing mother.
- Alan Alda as Milton Greene, Jack's biological father.
- Steve Buscemi as Lenny Wosniak, a private investigator hired by Jack.
- Marceline Hugot as Kathy Geiss, Don Geiss' socially awkward middle-aged daughter.
- Nancy O'Dell as herself
- Sherri Shepherd as Angie Jordan, Tracy's no-nonsense wife.
- Rip Torn as Don Geiss, CEO of General Electric and Jack's boss and mentor.
- Meredith Viera as herself

=== Guest stars ===
- Clay Aiken as himself (Episode: "Kidney Now!")
- Harry Anderson as himself (Episode: "The One with the Cast of Night Court")
- Jennifer Aniston as Claire Harper, Liz and Jenna's old roommate from college. (Episode: "The One with the Cast of Night Court")
- Will Arnett as Devon Banks, Jack's nemesis and NBC's Vice President of West Coast News, Web Content and Theme Park Talent Relations. (Episode: "Do-Over")
- Sara Bareilles as herself (Episode: "Kidney Now!")
- Roger Bart as Brad Halster, a consultant hired to slash TGS's budget. (Episode: "Cutbacks")
- Beastie Boys as themselves (Episode: "Kidney Now!")
- Mary J. Blige as herself (Episode: "Kidney Now!")
- Billy Bush as himself (Episode: "Señor Macho Solo")
- Elvis Costello as himself (Episode: "Kidney Now!")
- Sheryl Crow as herself (Episode: "Kidney Now!")
- Peter Dinklage as Stewart LaGrange, a diplomatic attaché at the United Nations who Liz dates. (Episode: "Señor Macho Solo")
- Steve Earle as himself (Episode: "Kidney Now!")
- Donald Glover as a gay kid. (Episode: "Kidney Now!")
- Jackie Hoffman as Rochelle Gaulke, the defendant in a case in which Liz is on the jury. (Episode: "The Funcooker")
- Wyclef Jean as himself (Episode: "Kidney Now!")
- Norah Jones as herself (Episode: "Kidney Now!")
- Calvin Klein as himself (Episode: "The Bubble")
- Larry King as himself (Episode: "Larry King")
- Talib Kweli as himself (Episode: "Kidney Now!")
- Matt Lauer as himself (Episode: "Generalissimo")
- Cyndi Lauper as herself (Episode: "Kidney Now!")
- Adam Levine as himself (Episode: "Kidney Now!")
- John Lithgow as himself (Episode: "Goodbye, My Friend")
- Patti LuPone as Sylvia Rossitano, Frank's stereotypical Italian-American mother. (Episode: "Goodbye, My Friend")
- Steve Martin as Gavin Volure, an agoraphobic entrepreneur who takes an interest in Liz. (Episode: "Gavin Volure")
- Michael McDonald as himself (Episode: "Kidney Now!")
- John McEnroe as himself (Episode: "Gavin Volure")
- Rhett Miller as himself (Episode: "Kidney Now!")
- Moby as himself (Episode: "Kidney Now!")
- Janel Moloney as Jessica, a member of Liz's graduating class from high school. (Episode: "Reunion")
- Megan Mullally as Bev, Liz's hostile adoption agent. (Episode: "Do-Over")
- Diane Neal as Erin, a member of Liz's graduating class from high school. (Episode: "Reunion")
- Don Pardo as Sid, the TGS announcer. (Episode: "Cutbacks")
- Paula Pell as Paula Hornberger, Pete's wife. (Episode: "Kidney Now!")
- Markie Post as herself (Episode: "The One with the Cast of Night Court")
- Robert Randolph as himself (Episode: "Kidney Now!")
- Charlie Robinson as himself (Episode: "The One with the Cast of Night Court")
- Amy Schumer as a stylist. (Episode: "Mamma Mia")
- Maria Thayer as Jennifer Rogers, a blind woman who Kenneth has a crush on. (Episode: "St. Valentine's Day")
- Adam West as himself (Episode: "Apollo, Apollo")
- Brian Williams as himself (Episode: "The Ones")
- Oprah Winfrey as herself (Episode: "Believe in the Stars")
- Dean Winters as Dennis Duffy, Liz's immature ex-boyfriend. (Episode: "Apollo, Apollo")
- Rachael Yamagata as herself (Episode: "Kidney Now!")

== Episodes ==
No. overall	No. in season	Title	Directed by	Written by	Original release date	Prod. code	U.S. viewers (millions)
37	1	"Do-Over"	Don Scardino	Tina Fey	October 30, 2008	301	8.66
Liz tries to stop the TGS staff from ruining her chances at adoption when an adoption agency evaluator, named Bev (Megan Mullally), comes to 30 Rock to determine whether Liz would make a good mother. Jack returns from Washington, D.C., and starts his job again at NBC, only to discover he has been demoted. Jack tries to get his old job and office back from Devon Banks (Will Arnett) and Kathy Geiss (Marceline Hugot). A feud between Tracy and Jenna wreaks havoc among the TGS staff.
38	2	"Believe in the Stars"	Don Scardino	Robert Carlock	November 6, 2008	302	8.07
To get out of jury duty, Liz flies to Chicago only to be seated next to Oprah Winfrey on her return flight to New York. Meanwhile, Kenneth challenges Jack's morality after it is found out that NBC faked some Olympic events during the summer as a ratings stunt, and Jenna and Tracy switch race and gender to see who has it tougher.
39	3	"The One with the Cast of Night Court"	Gail Mancuso	Jack Burditt	November 13, 2008	303	7.60
Liz's former roommate from Chicago, Claire Harper (Jennifer Aniston), comes to visit her and Jenna, but Claire ends up clinging to Jack. Meanwhile, Kenneth is unhappy with the new NBC page uniform, so Tracy decides to cheer him up by bringing on Harry Anderson, Markie Post, and Charlie Robinson from the original 1980s version of Night Court, prompting Kenneth to write and have Anderson, Post, and Robinson act out the series finale that most fans felt should have happened.
40	4	"Gavin Volure"	Gail Mancuso	John Riggi	November 20, 2008	304	7.08
Liz meets one of Jack's friends, the eccentric businessman Gavin Volure (Steve Martin), who falls for her until Gavin tells her why he's become a recluse. Meanwhile, after learning about The Menendez brothers murdering their parents, Tracy fears his children, Tracy Jr. and George Foreman Jordan, are out to get him, and Kenneth loses his money investing in Gavin Volure.
41	5	"Reunion"	Beth McCarthy	Matt Hubbard	December 4, 2008	305	7.18
Don Geiss (Rip Torn) finally wakes up from his coma and shocks Jack with his announcement that he will be remaining CEO of GE (General Electric). Meanwhile, Jenna and Tracy worry that Kenneth the Page is getting more attention than them and Liz reluctantly goes to her high school reunion, and discovers that, while she remembers her high school days as being the shy nerd girl who got bullied by the pretty, popular crowd, everyone else remembers her as the abrasive, antisocial nerd girl who insulted and belittled people.
42	6	"Christmas Special"	Don Scardino	Kay Cannon & Tina Fey	December 11, 2008	306	7.38
In the Christmas episode, Liz decides to deliver presents to underprivileged children after her own family ditches their holiday plans with her. Jack's mother, Colleen (Elaine Stritch), stops Jack from going on a Christmas vacation so he ends up taking his frustration out on the TGS staff by forcing them to produce a Christmas episode.
43	7	"Señor Macho Solo"	Beth McCarthy	Ron Weiner	January 8, 2009	307	5.37
Jenna is concerned when Liz becomes attracted to a new man (Peter Dinklage). Jack tries to help Tracy and Angie Jordan (Sherri Shepherd) organize a postnuptial agreement and Jenna auditions for a Janis Joplin biographical film. Meanwhile, Jack finds a new love in the form of Elisa (Salma Hayek), his mother's nurse.
44	8	"Flu Shot"	Don Scardino	Jon Pollack	January 15, 2009	308	6.63
Liz campaigns for her staff's right to get flu shots from Dr. Spaceman, but Jack will not allow it due to a limited supply. Jack tries to think of creative ways to spend time with Elisa as she works seven days a week. Meanwhile, Jenna and Tracy try to do something nice for the crew.
45	9	"Retreat to Move Forward"	Steve Buscemi	Tami Sagher	January 22, 2009	309	6.41
Nervous about his performance at a corporate retreat following his Bush administration and CEO debacles, Jack invites Liz to the retreat for moral support. Jenna employs method acting for her Janis Joplin role, which Frank quickly takes advantage of. After Tracy is diagnosed with diabetes Kenneth attempts to find a way to dissuade Tracy from eating sugary food.
46	10	"Generalissimo"	Todd Holland	Robert Carlock	February 5, 2009	310	6.39
Former Wall Street hotheads become interns at the TGS studios, much to Tracy's exhaustion. Jack deals with Elisa's grandmother's hatred due to a strange lookalike coincidence. Liz schemes to win over her new neighbor, Dr. Drew Baird (Jon Hamm) after accidentally receiving his mail.
47	11	"St. Valentine's Day"	Don Scardino	Jack Burditt & Tina Fey	February 12, 2009	311	7.68
Liz invites Dr. Baird on their first date, accidentally scheduling it for Valentine's Day. While she tries to plan a date that will not be awkward, Jack's Valentine's dinner plans with Elisa must be postponed to attend church with her. Kenneth falls for a new staffer (Maria Thayer) and Tracy tries to help him with the romance.
48	12	"Larry King"	Constantine Makris	Matt Hubbard	February 26, 2009	312	6.36
Jack considers taking the next step in his relationship with Elisa. Tracy appears on Larry King Live and inadvertently triggers mayhem in New York City in responding to questions about the economy. In addition, Tracy's interview sends the TGS crew on a search of the 30 Rock building for a treasure. Liz loses her phone and must go with Kenneth to Queens to recover her phone which is being held for ransom.
49	13	"Goodbye, My Friend"	John Riggi	Ron Weiner	March 5, 2009	313	7.25
Liz tries to adopt the baby of a pregnant teen she meets in a donut shop. Kenneth learns that Tracy has never celebrated his birthday and ends up asking Jenna to share her birthday celebration with Tracy. Jack goes on a "guy's night out" with some of the TGS writers and Frank tells Jack about his daddy issues.
50	14	"The Funcooker"	Ken Whittingham	Donald Glover & Tom Ceraulo	March 12, 2009	314	6.43
Liz leaves the TGS crew unmanaged as she must participate in jury duty for the trial of an oddly familiar woman. Kenneth tries to assert control over the crew in her stead and Jack uses the writers to develop a new name for a GE product. Meanwhile, Jenna seeks Dr. Spaceman's help so she can work on TGS and her movie. Elsewhere, Tracy comes to the conclusion that being able to afford FCC fines is a license to swear on television. When TGS' ad sponsors threaten to pull out due to Tracy's behavior, Tracy buys the ad time himself.
51	15	"The Bubble"	Tricia Brock	Tina Fey	March 19, 2009	315	7.13
Liz learns that Drew's attractiveness has led to society giving him special treatment and Liz tries to bring this to his attention. Meanwhile, Jack attempts to renegotiate Tracy Jordan's contract but hits a snag when Tracy realizes he no longer needs money thanks to his video game success. Finally Jenna gets a new hairstyle to try to capture the public's attention.
52	16	"Apollo, Apollo"	Millicent Shelton	Robert Carlock	March 26, 2009	316	7.17
While Jack plans the perfect 50th birthday party for himself he watches old home videos that inspire him to recreate one of the happiest moments he had as a young boy. Liz's ex-boyfriend Dennis (Dean Winters) decides to come clean to Liz about an addiction, stirring up drama between Liz and Jenna. Kenneth and Pete team up to make Tracy's childhood dream come true.
53	17	"Cutbacks"	Gail Mancuso	Matt Hubbard	April 9, 2009	317	6.81
Joy about the 50th TGS episode turns to worry when word spreads about imminent budget cuts at 30 Rock. Before long, Jack must fire several employees to save money, Kenneth takes on new responsibilities, and Liz wheels and deals to spare her staffers from layoffs. Meanwhile, Jenna and Tracy suspect that Kenneth is masking a deep dark secret.
54	18	"Jackie Jormp-Jomp"	Don Scardino	Kay Cannon & Tracey Wigfield	April 16, 2009	318	7.32
Liz meets a new group of friends while on suspension from work. Meanwhile, Jack is worried that Jenna's Janis Joplin biographical film will not get released and tries to promote the movie at the Nickelodeon Kids' Choice Awards. However, following a mix-up, the world believes Jenna is dead and Jack tries to use her death to further hype the film.
55	19	"The Ones"	Beth McCarthy	Jack Burditt	April 23, 2009	319	6.30
Jack goes shopping with Liz for an engagement ring for Elisa. Jack grows worried about whether he and Elisa's potential marriage would survive in the real world, but Tracy counsels him on married life. Meanwhile, Elisa tells Liz that she is keeping a secret. A prank results in an injury back at TGS and Jenna falls in love with an attractive emergency medical technician who comes to help.
56	20	"The Natural Order"	Scott Ellis	John Riggi & Tina Fey	April 30, 2009	320	5.95
Liz reprimands Tracy in front of the staff for not acting professionally. Liz worries, expecting Tracy to act out, but he surprises her by instead acting very professionally. Tracy says that because he no longer requests special treatment as an actor, Liz should give up any privileges she is given as a woman. Jack's mother, Colleen (Elaine Stritch), comes to visit revealing memories about Jack's father. Jenna adopts a pet gibbon and learns about motherhood.
57	21	"Mamma Mia"	Don Scardino	Ron Weiner	May 7, 2009	321	6.13
Jack begins to search for his biological father with help from Liz. Meanwhile, Tracy introduces his supposedly illegitimate son to the cast and crew of TGS, but some question his intentions. Meanwhile, Jenna and Liz fight for attention when Jenna gets public recognition for a comedic sketch Liz wrote.
58	22	"Kidney Now!"	Don Scardino	Jack Burditt & Robert Carlock	May 14, 2009	322	5.70
Jack gets to know his newly discovered father, but soon discovers Milton (Alan Alda) has a serious medical condition and needs a kidney. Liz gains notoriety as a relationship expert for a sketch she wrote. Meanwhile, Tracy is invited to speak at his former high school's graduation and Kenneth tries to help him overcome troubling memories from his high school experience. A major musical number spoofs "We Are the World" with various celebrity musical guests performing the titular song "Kidney Now!"

== Production ==
NBC announced the renewal of 30 Rock for a third season in April 2008, while the second season was midway through its run after a hiatus caused by the 2007–08 Writers Guild of America strike. At the time, the show's viewership was considered modest in size but reportedly "among the most upscale on TV", justifying the renewal. The renewal of 30 Rock also coincided with Fey's increased public profile for her film Baby Mama. At the renewal, actor Jack McBrayer stated, "That anxiety we had last year has dissipated."

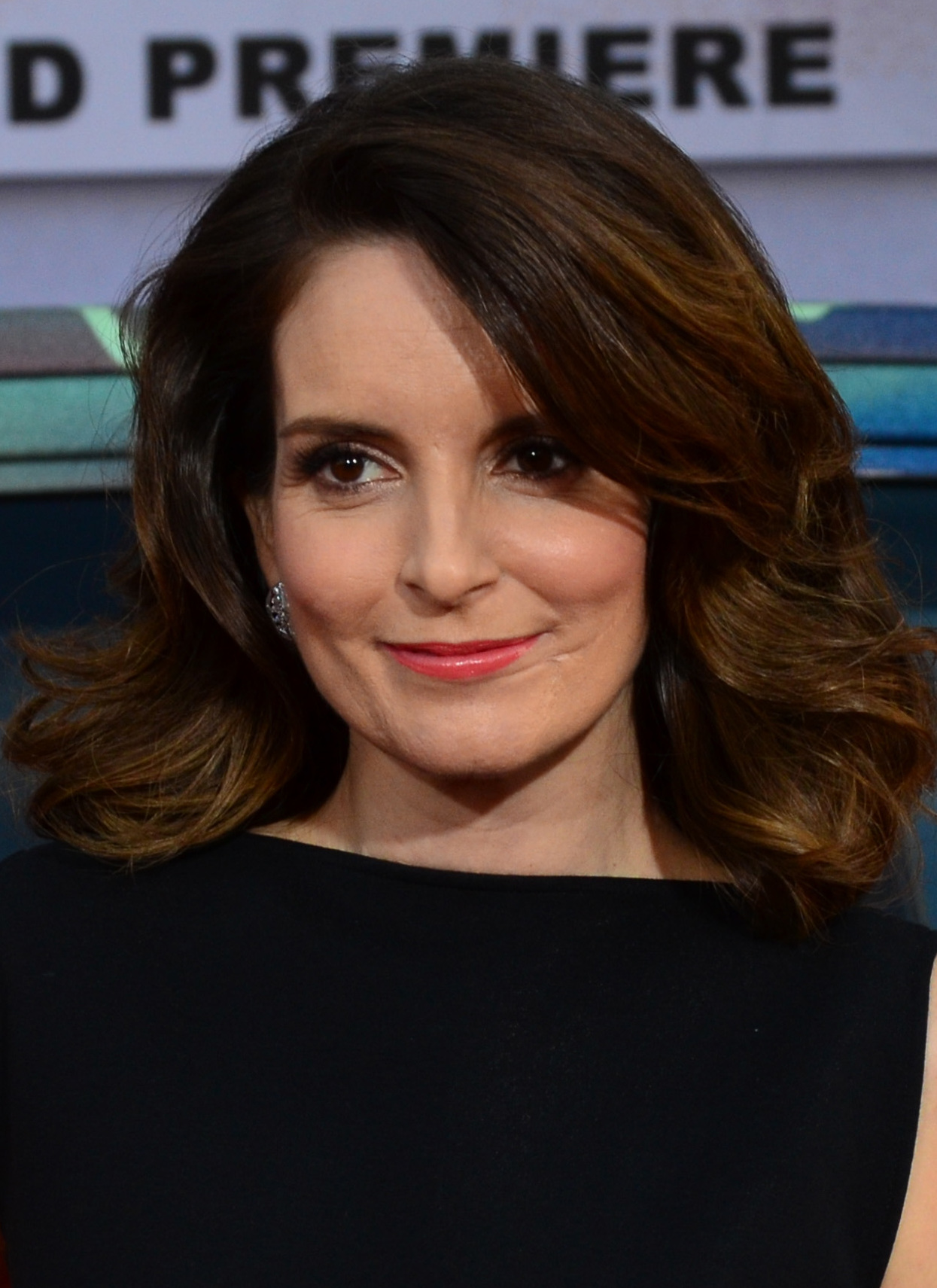
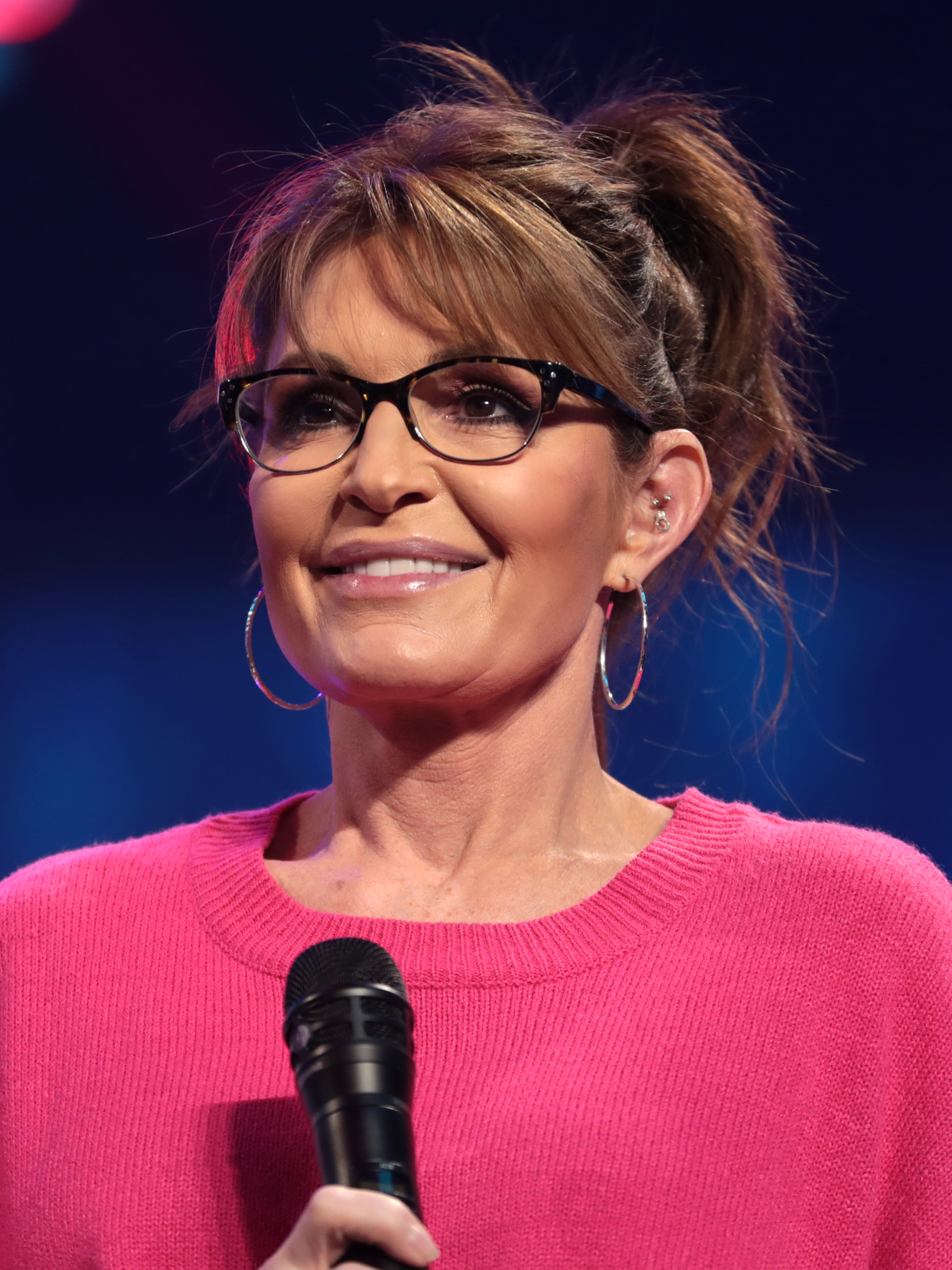
Tina Fey (left) gained attention for her SNL parodies of then-Vice Presidential candidate Sarah Palin (right) during the filming of season 3.

In September 2008, filming of season three was interrupted by Fey's appearances on late night sketch comedy Saturday Night Live (SNL), where she parodied then-Vice Presidential candidate Alaska Governor Sarah Palin. Fey's Saturday Night Live parodies of Sarah Palin delayed the release of the season, which premiered October 30, 2008. Fey expressed hope that the viral popularity of the SNL segments would increase the viewership of 30 Rock. Her schedule during the season's production was characterized as a grueling one, combining late nights writing and performing for both 30 Rock and SNL; the writers' assistant Tom Ceraulo describes writing "St. Valentine's Day" after a fourteen-hour shooting day with Fey "literally slapping herself to stay awake". As in previous seasons, production fell behind schedule as it proceeded; the season finale, "Kidney Now!", was written only a week before filming.

The third season was produced by Broadway Video, Little Stranger, Inc., and Universal Media Studios and aired on NBC. JoAnn Alfano, who had been an executive producer for the first and second seasons, departed prior to season three. Ron Weiner became a co-executive producer after being a story editor for the second season. Series regular Alec Baldwin became a producer for the third season. Season three's executive producers included Fey, the creator of the series, alongside Lorne Michaels, Marci Klein, David Miner, and Robert Carlock, with Jack Burditt, John Riggi, and Weiner acting as co-executive producers. The producers for the season were Jerry Kupfer, Don Scardino, and Baldwin with Diana Schmidt and Irene Burns as co-producers.

There were 11 directors through the season. Those who directed multiple episodes were series producer Don Scardino, Gail Mancuso, and Beth McCarthy. There were eight directors who each directed one episode throughout the season: Steve Buscemi, Todd Holland, Constantine Makris, John Riggi, Ken Whittingham, Tricia Brock, Millicent Shelton, and Scott Ellis. Riggi's direction of "Goodbye, My Friend" was his first time moving from writer to director; he directed frequently in future seasons. Series writers who penned episodes this season include Fey, Carlock, Burditt, Riggi, and Matt Hubbard.

== Distribution ==
The season was broadcast in the United States under NBC's promotional banner "Comedy Night Done Right" on Thursdays at 9:30 p.m. Eastern Time, immediately following The Office. In addition to the United States, 30 Rock was broadcast in Canada, the United Kingdom, and Australia. The Canadian broadcast was simulcast on Citytv. This season of 30 Rock was shown in Australia on the Seven Network at 11:30 p.m. local time. The third season began in the United Kingdom on October 5, 2009, on Comedy Central, moving from Five where the previous season had aired.

The season was released on DVD by Universal Studios on September 22, 2009, in the United States and Canada after it had completed an initial broadcast run on NBC, followed by an Australian release on November 11, 2009. The 3-disc set of 22 episodes has a 1.78:1 aspect ratio, Dolby Surround 2.0 and 5.1, and English and Spanish subtitles. In addition to the episodes, the DVD set special features included unaired scenes, featurettes, and audio commentary on the select episodes, "Flu Shot", "Goodbye, My Friend", "The Bubble", "Apollo, Apollo", "The Ones", "Mamma Mia" and "Kidney Now!".

== Reception ==
=== Critical reception ===
Metacritic, which uses a weighted average, gave the season a rating of 84/100 from 17 reviews, signifying "universal acclaim". On Rotten Tomatoes, a review aggregator, the season has an approval rating of 93% with an average score of 8.3 out of 10 based on 40 reviews. The website's critical consensus reads, "Brandishing its trademark silliness with vigor, 30 Rock's third season hits the ground running and cements its reputation as one of the smartest, funniest comedies on television." Robert Canning of IGN called the third season "a series at the top of its game", scoring the season a 9.3 out of 10. In particular, Canning noted that the "first half of the year ... had the most focus." Eight of the season's episodes made Variety's list of the show's "Best 30 Episodes, Ranked" with "Reunion" the highest ranked at fourth place. Canning said the premiere episode "Do-Over" was "filled to capacity with comedy", called "Señor Macho Solo" "near perfect", and said the story for the finale "Kidney Now!" was "fun" but "average for a season finale." Jeremy Medina of Paste reviewed the premiere, saying it was "like the first day of school after summer vacation: sort of awkward at times, but fast and buoyant and warmly familiar all the same". /Film ranked the season the third-best of the show's seven seasons. Alynda Wheat of Entertainment Weekly, reviewing the DVD release, gave the season an A−. The season also drew praise for Tracy Morgan and Jack McBrayer's performances. Brian Lowry of Variety was more critical, calling the third season "wildly uneven" and saying 30 Rock was "merely a good comedy whose shortcomings prevent it from joining the ranks of great ones."

=== Ratings ===
Before the start of the season, the show had a reputation for high critical praise but relatively modest viewership, averaging around 6 million viewers per week; before the premiere, Fey said "I would like the audience to go up just enough so that people don't have to refer to it as 'the ratings-challenged 30 Rock' anymore." The season premiere, "Do-Over", received 8.7 million viewers and became the highest-viewed episode of the series. The sixth episode "Christmas Special" then broke that record, garnering 8.9 million viewers. Both episodes exceeded the show's previous record of 8.1 million for "Pilot", and represented an increase of more than 3 million from the previous season's finale. Digital Video Recorder (DVR) accounted for an average additional 1.2 million viewers for episodes of the third season. In December 2008, 30 Rock was the most popular series among upscale viewers, defined as those who have an income higher than $100,000 a year, on the broadcast networks. The show averaged 7.7 million viewers through the first ten episodes, a ratings level that Variety called "solid" and credited to pairing the show with The Office on NBC's Thursday schedule. Fey's increased public profile and the second season's record-breaking Emmy awards have also been noted as drivers for increased attention. The season finale, "Kidney Now!", aired on May 14, 2009, and was viewed by 5.7 million viewers. The second-lowest viewership of the season, this was less than expected, especially given the episode's focus on an ensemble musical performance by a large number of celebrities. In future seasons, ratings would continue to decline, with this season's best episodes representing the show's peak.

=== Awards and nominations ===
Season three of 30 Rock received 22 Emmy Award nominations, the most for a show in 2009, breaking 30 Rock's own record for the most nominated comedy in a single award year (previously 17). At the 61st Emmy Awards, 30 Rock was nominated for thirteen Primetime Emmy Awards and won three: the show as a whole won "Outstanding Comedy Series", Alec Baldwin won "Outstanding Lead Actor in a Comedy Series" for his role as Jack Donaghy, and Matt Hubbard won "Outstanding Writing in a Comedy Series" for his work on "Reunion". Four of the five episodes nominated for "Outstanding Writing in a Comedy Series" were from 30 Rock. Tina Fey, though nominated, did not win "Outstanding Lead Actress in a Comedy Series", which she had won the previous year; Toni Collette from The United States of Tara won instead. CNN called the decision a "mild surprise", saying Fey was the "heavy favorite". The show also had nine nominations at the 2009 Creative Arts Emmy Awards and won two: "Outstanding Casting for a Comedy Series" and "Outstanding Picture Editing for a Comedy Series", for the episode "Apollo, Apollo". Steve Martin, Jon Hamm, Alan Alda, Jennifer Aniston, and Elaine Stritch were all nominated for their guest appearances; the wins went to Justin Timberlake and Fey for their appearances on Saturday Night Live.

At the 15th Screen Actors Guild Awards, 30 Rock won "Outstanding Performance by an Ensemble in a Comedy Series" while Fey and Baldwin won "Outstanding Performance by a Female Actor in a Comedy Series" and "Outstanding Performance by a Male Actor in a Comedy Series" , respectively. The show, Fey, and Baldwin also won in their respective categories at the 66th Golden Globe Awards, and received nominations at the 14th Satellite Awards and the 25th Television Critics Association Awards.
