= Larry King (30 Rock) =

- 30 Rock episode
- Episode no.: Season 3 Episode 12
- Directed by: Constantine Makris
- Written by: Matt Hubbard
- Production code: 312
- Original air date: February 26, 2009

Guest appearances
- Salma Hayek as Elisa; Larry King as himself; Ajay Naidu as Asif; Brian Stack as Howard Jorgensen; Rip Torn as Don Geiss; Meredith Vieira as herself

Episode chronology
← Previous "St. Valentine's Day"	Next → "Goodbye, My Friend"
- 30 Rock season 3

"Larry King" is the twelfth episode of the third season of the American television comedy series 30 Rock, and the 48th overall episode of the series. It was written by supervising producer Matt Hubbard and directed by Constantine Makris. The episode originally aired on NBC in the United States on February 26, 2009. Salma Hayek, Ajay Naidu, Brian Stack, and Rip Torn guest star in "Larry King", and there are cameo appearances by Larry King and Meredith Vieira.

In the episode, Jack Donaghy (Alec Baldwin) considers taking the next step in his relationship with his girlfriend Elisa Pedrera (Salma Hayek). Tracy Jordan (Tracy Morgan) appears on Larry King Live and inadvertently triggers mayhem in New York City when responding to questions about the economy. In addition, Tracy's interview sends the crew members of the fictitious show TGS with Tracy Jordan—Pete Hornberger (Scott Adsit), Frank Rossitano (Judah Friedlander), James "Toofer" Spurlock (Keith Powell), and J. D. Lutz (John Lutz)—on a search of the 30 Rock building for a treasure. At the same time, Liz Lemon (Tina Fey) loses her cellphone and must go with NBC page Kenneth Parcell (Jack McBrayer) to Queens to recover it where it is being held for ransom by a taxi driver (Naidu).

"Larry King" has received generally positive reviews from television critics. According to the Nielsen Media Research, the episode was watched by 6.4 million households during its original broadcast, and received a 2.9 rating/7 share among viewers in the 18–49 demographic.

== Plot ==
Tracy Jordan (Tracy Morgan) appears on Larry King Live. During his appearance on the program, a breaking story interrupts his interview with show host Larry King—it is being reported that the Asian stocks are falling. Larry King asks Tracy's opinion on this story, which results in Tracy giving chaos-inducting views, including, "New York as we know it will no longer exist tomorrow" and he calls for panic, sending the people of New York into madness. At the NBC studios, the TGS with Tracy Jordan staff, Pete Hornberger (Scott Adsit), Frank Rossitano (Judah Friedlander), James "Toofer" Spurlock (Keith Powell), and J. D. Lutz (John Lutz), try looking for money that Tracy has hidden in the building after revealing this on Larry King Live. Pete calls the program asking Tracy where he stores the money. Tracy reveals that the safest place he has it hidden has "a hard top and soft bottom, no matter where it moves, the cash stays in the same place." This clue is of no help to Pete, Frank, Toofer, and Lutz.

Meanwhile, NBC page Kenneth Parcell (Jack McBrayer) escorts Liz Lemon (Tina Fey) to Queens to retrieve the cellphone she left in a cab. The taxi driver, Asif (Ajay Naidu), finds a racy picture of her and threatens to send it to everyone in her address book unless she pays him $2,000. While on their way to get the phone, chaos is happening around them, which prompts Kenneth to want to turn back. Trying to change his mind, Liz lies to Kenneth, telling him that her phone has sentimental value, although she later tells Kenneth the real reasons she wants her phone back. Feeling betrayed by Liz, Kenneth abandons her and returns to 30 Rock. Liz arrives at the taxi depot and tells Asif that she does not have the money to pay him because rioting children took her handbag. Then Kenneth shows up and they watch Tracy reveal his secret to the whereabouts of his money, prompting Kenneth to realize that the money is stored in his blazer. Kenneth pays Asif and Liz's phone is returned.

Finally, Jack Donaghy (Alec Baldwin) decides to be committed to his girlfriend, Elisa Pedrera (Salma Hayek), as Elisa wants to take their relationship to the next level. Jack persuades Elisa to cancel her annual trip to Puerto Rico so that the two can spend time together. As a result, Jack devotes a whole week to Elisa at exactly the same time as the economic crisis unfolds, forcing Jack to steer General Electric (GE) through the Asian market crash. After a video tape of GE CEO Don Geiss (Rip Torn) surfaces—taped in the event of a financial meltdown—Geiss says "it is the end, and love is all that matters", which makes Jack realize his love for Elisa. He proposes marriage to her, which she accepts. The day after, Elisa leaves Jack for Puerto Rico.

== Production ==
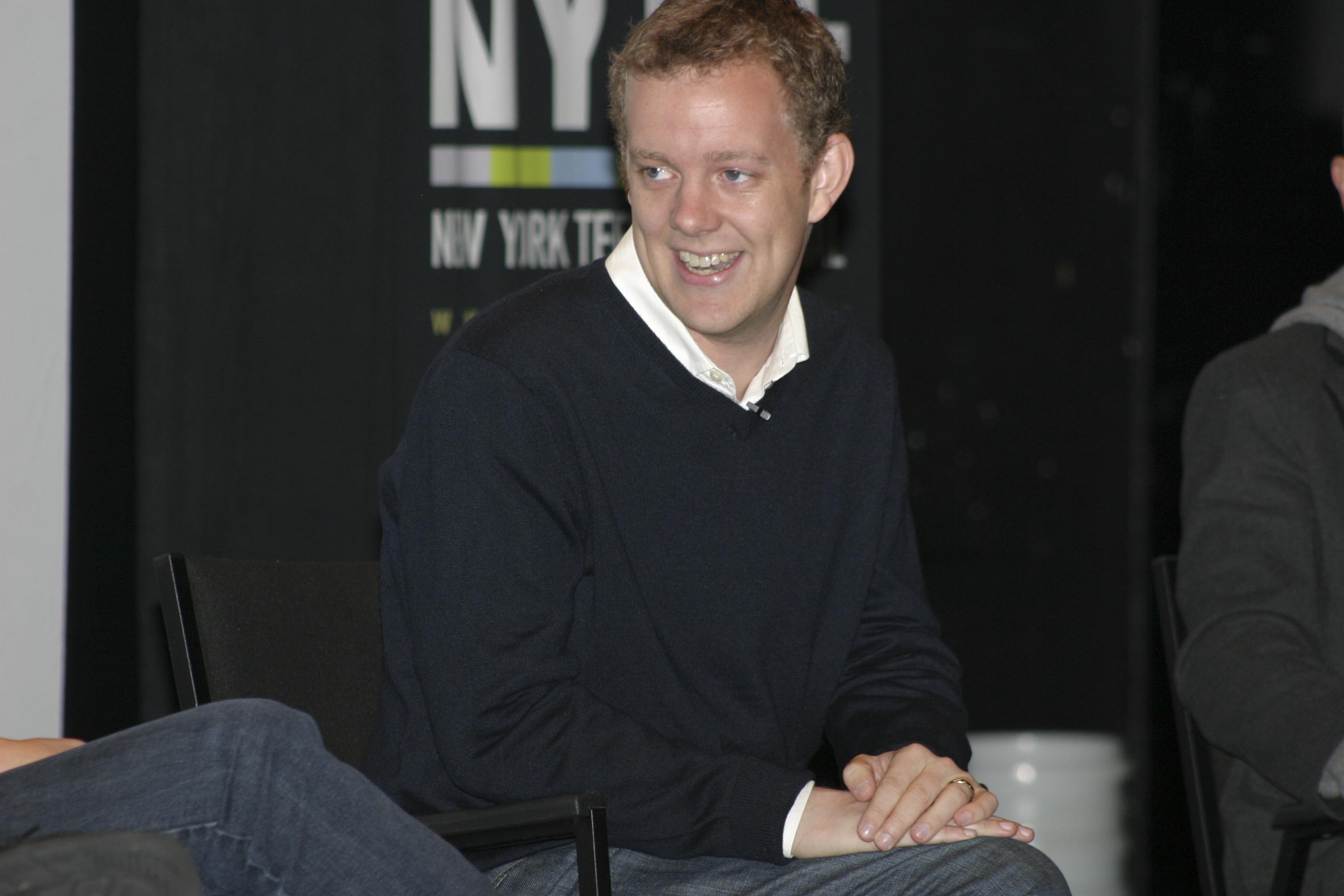
"Larry King" was written by supervising producer Matt Hubbard (pictured).

"Larry King" was written by 30 Rock supervising producer Matt Hubbard, and directed by Constantine Makris. This was Hubbard's sixth writing credit, and Makris' first directed episode. "Larry King" originally aired in the United States on February 26, 2009, on NBC as the twelfth episode of the show's third season and the 48th overall episode of the series.

In November 2008, it was reported that television talk show host Larry King had "quietly filmed an appearance" as himself on 30 Rock. This episode was actress Salma Hayek's fifth appearance as Elisa on the show. She first appeared in the episode "Señor Macho Solo" as a nurse for Jack Donaghy's mother and love interest for Jack. She made appearances in the episodes "Flu Shot", "Generalissimo", and "St. Valentine's Day". Her last guest spot was in the episode "The Ones" in which Elisa and Jack end their relationship. Actor Rip Torn made his seventh appearance on the series as GE CEO Don Geiss. "Larry King" would become Torn's final appearance on the show, as it is revealed in the fourth season episode "Future Husband" that his character has died. Comedian actor Brian Stack made his third appearance as Howard Jorgensen, a GE executive and associate of Jack's. Stack previously appeared in the episodes "Jack Meets Dennis" and "Succession". Actor Ajay Naidu played Asif, the taxi driver holding Liz's phone for ransom in "Larry King". "Larry King" was Today show co-host Meredith Vieira's second guest appearance as herself, having appeared in the November 8, 2007, episode "Greenzo" that aired during the show's second season. In the episode, the night after the economic crisis unfolded, Tracy appears on The Today Show. There, Vieira tells him that he is to blame for the panic that ensued around the city. She asks Tracy's opinion on the matter, only for Tracy to advertise TGS, the show he stars in, when and what time it airs.

== Cultural references ==
"I'm new to this country. Is that a real thing?", asks Asif, after Liz tells him that she would pay him on Opposite Day. While on Larry King Live, Tracy recounts the entire plot of the film Teen Wolf (1985). Tracy reveals that he was to appear in the movie Rush Hour, but was replaced by Hong Kong actor Jackie Chan. Liz lies to Kenneth that her phone has a recording of her deceased grandmother singing a lullaby, to which later Kenneth makes her sing the song and his realization that she was singing the song "99 Luftballons", a protest song from German singer Nena.

When Pete calls in on Larry King Live, Tracy believes Pete is Peter Frampton, a British musician. When Jack realizes his true feelings for Elisa, he decides to stop her from going to Puerto Rico, but when he sees her outside the 30 Rock building, he tells her, "I was about to do the whole run to the airport thing, like Ross did on Friends and Liz Lemon did in real life", a reference to the Friends television character Ross Geller doing this in the series finale episode "The Last One", and as Liz similarly does in the season two episode "Sandwich Day", where she heads to the airport to make things right with her ex-boyfriend, Floyd DeBarber (Jason Sudeikis).

== Reception ==
In its original American broadcast, "Larry King" was watched by 6.4 million households, according to the Nielsen Media Research. This episode earned a 2.9 rating/7 share in the 18 and 49 demographic, meaning that 2.9 percent of all people in that group, and 7 percent of all people from that group watching television at the time, watched the episode. This was a decrease from the previous episode, "St. Valentine's Day", which was watched by 7.6 million American viewers. Nonetheless, 30 Rock ranked number 7 among all primetime programs—during the original broadcasting of this episode—in adults aged between 18 and 34, averaging a 3.4 rating/10 share in that demographic.

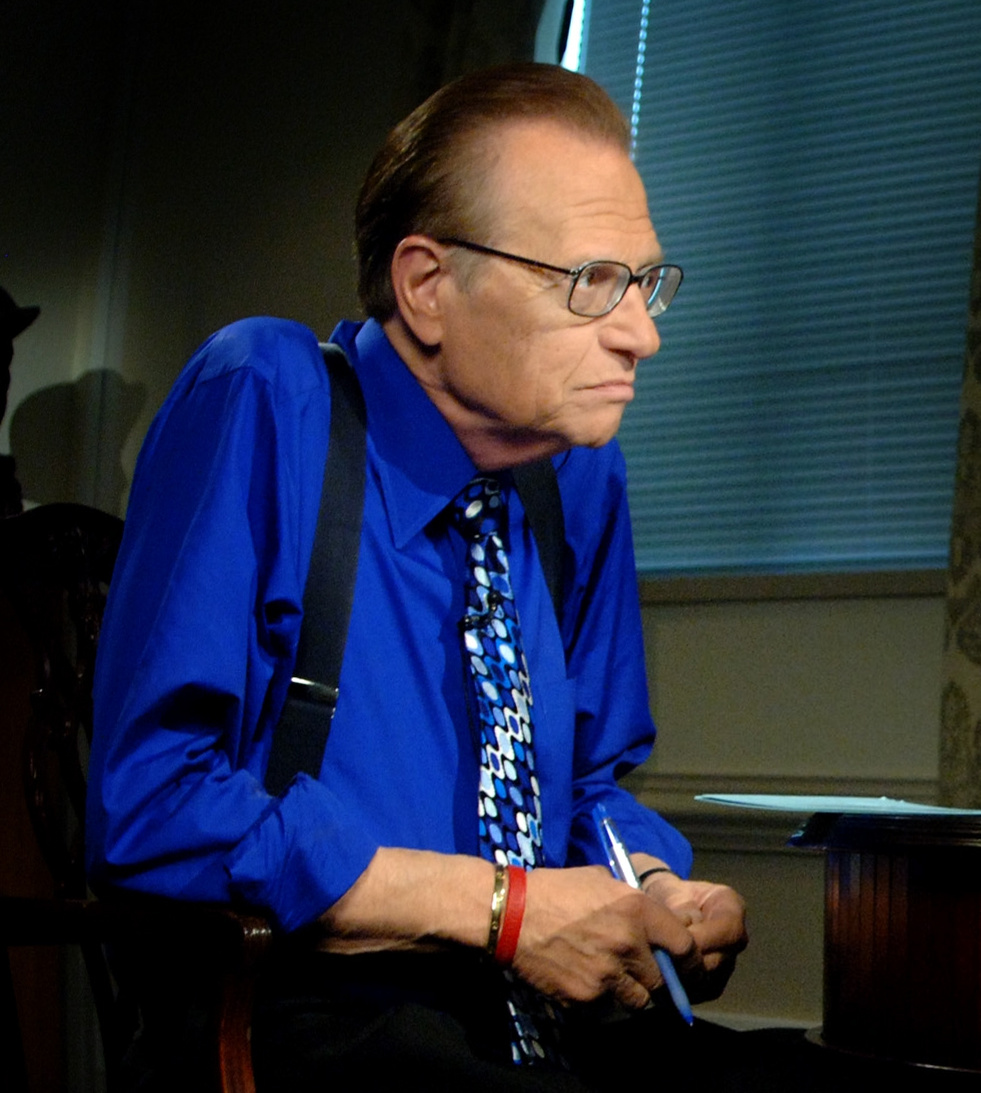
Alan Sepinwall for The Star-Ledger enjoyed Larry King's appearance on 30 Rock.

Since airing, "Larry King" has received generally positive reviews from television critics. Bob Sassone of AOL's TV Squad wrote that "Larry King" was the "best of the season so far", saying that there was a "really nice balance" in the episode's plots. Sassone said that Hayek was "fine", but much preferred the Jack character single. Alan Sepinwall, television columnist for The Star-Ledger, complimented the episode, reporting that it was "much better" and perhaps the first episode he enjoyed "unreservedly." He added that the entire cast was used "well" and that it "gave us a Jack story that balanced comedy with some genuine emotion, got some good mileage out of a rare Liz/Kenneth story ... and employed the guest stars as well as they have all season." IGN contributor Robert Canning admitted in his recap that he was "thrilled" after reading the synopsis of the episode, regarding to Tracy causing mayhem in New York, but after the airing, "I was a bit disappointed" as it "wasn't as over-the-top", but overall, "this was still a fun and funny episode." Canning gave the episode an 8 out of 10 rating. Time contributor James Poniewozik enjoyed Liz and Kenneth's story as it "felt more emotionally real" and "allowed Kenneth to get to show a bit more spine than usual, standing up to Liz on their journey to darkest Queens". Poniewozik noted that it was "nice" to see the Pete character back, as Scott Adsit had not appeared on 30 Rock for quite some time.

Not all reviews were positive. Matt Mitovich from TV Guide wrote that "Larry King" was "pretty blah. Something about it just seemed drab and lifeless, as if the writers and cast were in a mad dash to break for Christmas." The A.V. Club's Scott Tobias believed that the episode was not up to "30 Rock's high standards" and commented that a "big problem" was Jack and Elisa's storyline. "The concept of rich, superficial, commitment-phobic workaholic Jack falling for his exact opposite isn't a bad one, but Hayek's run has been more or less a wash." Tobias further added that Alec Baldwin and Salma Hayek "are an odd couple" citing that they do not have much chemistry together.
