= The One with the Cast of Night Court =

- 30 Rock episode
- Episode no.: Season 3 Episode 3
- Directed by: Gail Mancuso
- Written by: Jack Burditt
- Production code: 303
- Original air date: November 13, 2008

Guest appearances
- Harry Anderson as himself; Jennifer Aniston as Claire; Markie Post as herself; Charlie Robinson as himself

Episode chronology
← Previous "Believe in the Stars"	Next → "Gavin Volure"
- 30 Rock season 3

"The One with the Cast of Night Court" is the third episode of the third season of the American television comedy series 30 Rock. It was written by co-executive producer Jack Burditt and directed by Gail Mancuso. The episode originally aired on NBC in the United States on November 13, 2008.

The episode received mixed reception from television critics. According to the Nielsen ratings system, it was watched by 7.5 million households during its original broadcast and received a 4.6 rating/7 share among viewers in the 18–49 demographic. For her performance in this episode, Jennifer Aniston received a Primetime Emmy Award nomination in the category for Outstanding Guest Actress in a Comedy Series. The title of the episode is a reference to Aniston's show Friends, with most episode titles beginning with the prefix "The One with".

== Plot ==
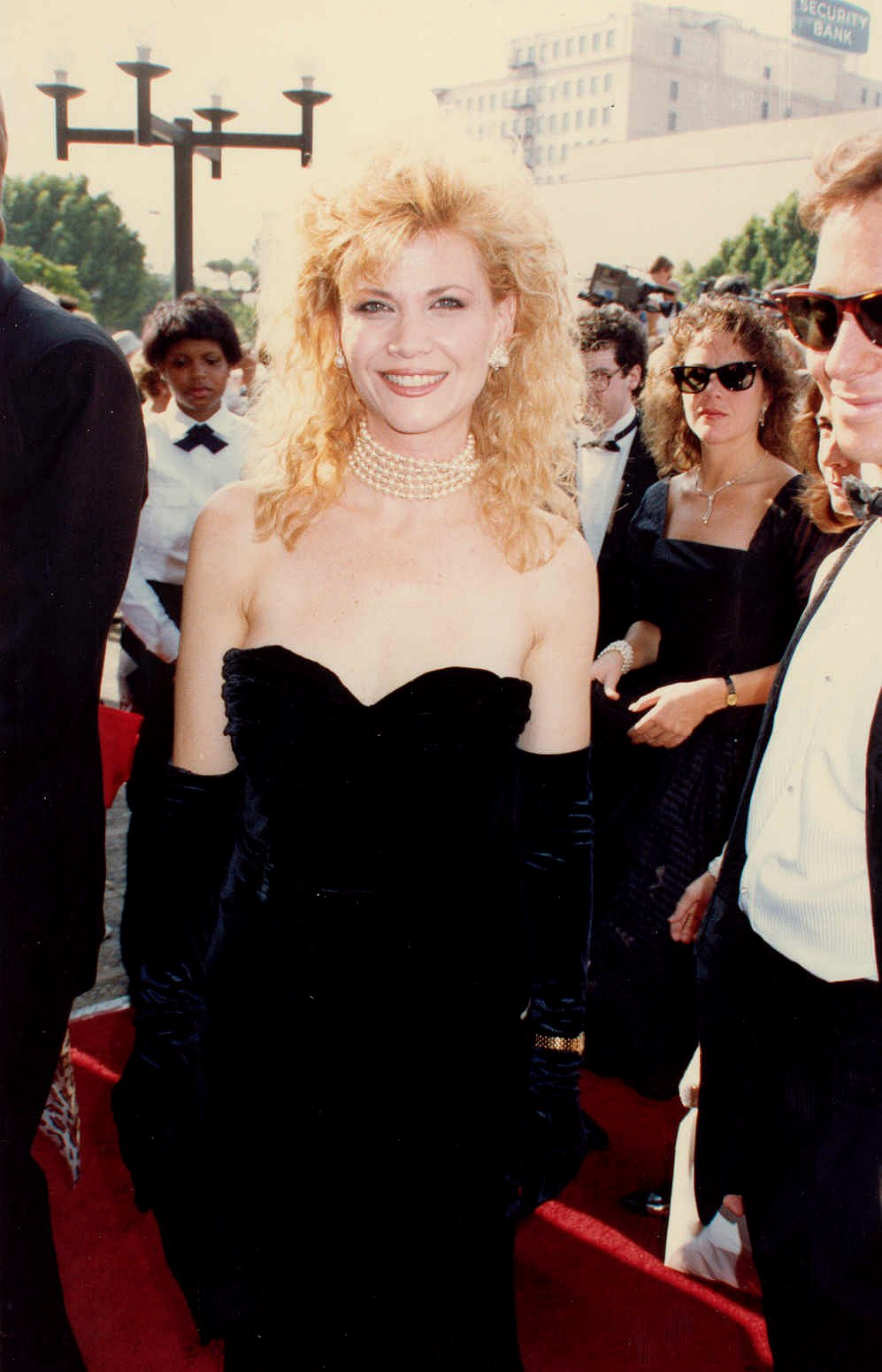
Markie Post, seen here in 1988, was one of the Night Court cast members who played themselves in this episode

Liz Lemon (Tina Fey) and Jenna Maroney (Jane Krakowski) await the arrival of their old Chicago roommate, Claire Harper (Jennifer Aniston). The two are not thrilled with her visit as they find her exhausting to be around. Immediately, their boss Jack Donaghy (Alec Baldwin) is attracted to Claire, but Liz tells him not to get involved with her. Jack, however, reveals to Liz that the two have already slept together. At a General Electric formal function, Claire surprises Jack by singing a sexy rendition of "Happy Birthday" to him, an allusion to Marilyn Monroe's performance for John F. Kennedy's birthday. He tells her that she needs to leave, so Claire loudly threatens to kill herself. To help Jack, Liz gets Claire to abandon her plans with Jack and instead go out nightclubbing with her and Jenna. At the club, Claire does not show up, which prompts Liz to call Jack to warn him about potential danger. He finds Claire inside his apartment and ends up sleeping with her again. When asked to choose between Liz and Claire, Jack chooses Claire, but Claire, thinking that the relationship has gotten boring, turns on Jack.

Meanwhile, NBC page Kenneth Parcell (Jack McBrayer) is not happy with the new page uniforms. Wanting to see Kenneth happy again, Tracy Jordan (Tracy Morgan) gets actors Harry Anderson, Markie Post, and Charlie Robinson from the television show Night Court to come to 30 Rock, where Anderson and Post agree to stage the wedding of their respective characters, Judge Harry Stone and Christine Sullivan. Kenneth is excited when he finds out that he can finally see the Night Court wedding, which never occurred before the show was canceled by the network. When a conflict between Anderson and Post ensues, it seems that the wedding will not take place. However, Anderson and Post make up and rehearse. As Tracy and Kenneth finish taping the final scenes of Harry and Christine's wedding, Harry declares it illegal to wear the new page uniforms and demands the old ones be brought back. Tracy tells Kenneth that he added that part in the script as he complained to Kenneth's superiors to bring back the old uniforms, which makes Kenneth happy.

== Production ==
"The One with the Cast of Night Court" was written by co-executive producer Jack Burditt and directed by Gail Mancuso. This was Burditt's eighth writing credit and was Mancuso's fourth directed episode. It originally aired on NBC in the United States on November 13, 2008, as the third episode of the show's third season. Its title, "The One...", is the convention used to name episodes of guest star Jennifer Aniston's prior sitcom Friends.

In August 2008, it was announced that actress Jennifer Aniston would guest star on 30 Rock. The following month it was confirmed by NBC that she would play a woman obsessed with Alec Baldwin's character, Jack Donaghy. She filmed her scenes on August 29 and September 4, 2008. In November 2008, it was announced that actors Markie Post, Harry Anderson and Charlie Robinson, the cast of the situation comedy show Night Court, would make a cameo on the show.

Two filmed scenes from "The One with the Cast of Night Court" were cut out from the airing. Instead, the scenes were featured on 30 Rock's season 3 DVD as part of the deleted scenes in the Bonus feature. In the first scene, Liz and Jenna recall their wild nights with Claire, including when Jenna and Claire danced around an opened fire hydrant, while Liz tells them that she does not feel safe. They also remember when they crashed a Polish wedding, in which Claire is seen dancing around a group of men. In the second scene, Harry Anderson is in Tracy's dressing room, after leaving rehearsal. Tracy enters to convince him to make up with Markie Post. In another room, Kenneth is seen with Markie Post. Anderson complains to Tracy about Post, as does Post about Anderson to Kenneth. Tracy tells him to forget about the past and fulfill Kenneth's dreams of a Night Court wedding to make Kenneth happy, as he is displeased with the new page uniforms he is forced to wear.

== Reception ==
In its original American broadcast, "The One with the Cast of Night Court" was watched by 7.5 million households, according to the Nielsen ratings system. It received a 4.6 rating/7 share among viewers in the 18–49 demographic, meaning that 4.6% of all people in that group, and 7% of all people from that group watching television at the time, watched the episode. This was a decrease from the previous episode, "Believe in the Stars", which was watched by 8.0 million American viewers. This episode was the tenth highest-rated show on the NBC network during the week of November 10–16, 2008. Jennifer Aniston received a Primetime Emmy Award nomination for Outstanding Guest Actress in a Comedy Series at the 61st Primetime Emmy Awards for her work in this episode, but lost to Tina Fey for her satirical portrayal of Sarah Palin on Saturday Night Live.

Since airing, "The One with the Cast of Night Court" has received mixed reception from television critics. Nathan Rabin of The A.V. Club wrote that the episode was "kooky, ooky and over-the-top" and enjoyed every minute of it. "For the more esoteric viewer, it's a milestone episode", said The Age's Farah Farouque. Cameron Adams for the Herald Sun called the episode hilarious, while The Boston Globe's Matthew Gilbert felt that it was flaccid and clichéd. IGN contributor Robert Canning said that the episode "did have its moments" and that the storylines "had their potential, and their share of laughs, but I can't help but feel they both could have been so much more." He opined that the Kenneth and Tracy story was "more up 30 Rock's style" but that it was a shame that the story could not "quite knock the concept out of the park." Overall, Canning rated "The One with the Cast of Night Court" a 7.9 out of 10. Jeff Labrecque for Entertainment Weekly reported that the episode fell flat.

Critical opinion was divided on Aniston's performance as Claire. TV Guide's Matt Mitovich wrote that Aniston "looked sweet, but the role was juuuuust a bit much ... [and] over-the-top." Jeremy Medina of Paste said that the show did not really seem to know what to do with Aniston in this episode. Tom Stempel for Slant Magazine said 30 Rock was "smart enough" not to make Claire resemble Aniston's former television character, Rachel, from Friends. Further in his review, Stempel said that Claire was a "great choice of character" for Aniston to play, and praised her for knocking the role "out of the park." Kerrie Murphy for The Australian was equally positive noting that Aniston fits in smoothly as Liz's former roommate. Murphy added, "Not only is it a reminder that Aniston is a gifted comic actor [...] With her, the show's regular cast easily hold their own."

Bob Sassone of AOL's TV Squad enjoyed the cameos of Harry Anderson, Markie Post, and Charles Robinson in the episode. Robert Philpot for the Fort Worth Star-Telegram wrote that the Night Court cast stole the show from Aniston. Television columnist Alan Sepinwall for The Star-Ledger wrote that he "got a much bigger kick out" of the Night Court story. Medina, who wrote that the episode was "mostly a success", disliked the Night Court subplot, claiming it was not funny.
