= Believe in the Stars =

- 30 Rock episode
- Episode no.: Season 3 Episode 2
- Directed by: Don Scardino
- Written by: Robert Carlock
- Production code: 302
- Original air date: November 6, 2008

Guest appearances
- Remy Auberjonois as Tyler Brody; Todd Buonopane as Jeffrey; Raven Goodwin as Pam; Oprah Winfrey as herself

Episode chronology
← Previous "Do-Over"	Next → "The One With the Cast of Night Court"
- 30 Rock season 3

"Believe in the Stars" is the second episode of the third season of the American television comedy series 30 Rock. The 38th overall episode of the series was written by executive producer Robert Carlock and directed by series producer Don Scardino. The episode originally aired on NBC in the United States on November 6, 2008. Guest stars in this episode include Remy Auberjonois, Todd Buonopane, Raven Goodwin, and Oprah Winfrey.

The episode's plot concerns a feud between Tracy Jordan (Tracy Morgan) and Jenna Maroney (Jane Krakowski) over royalties from Tracy's pornographic video game Gorgasm: The Legend of Dong Slayer. Liz Lemon (Tina Fey) attempts to settle the fight with the help of Oprah Winfrey, whom she meets on a return flight from Chicago. Meanwhile, NBC page Kenneth Parcell (Jack McBrayer) is stung by the revelation that most events from the 2008 Summer Olympics were staged to boost America's image and NBC's ratings. Jack Donaghy (Alec Baldwin) attempts to break Kenneth of his moral absolutism.

"Believe in the Stars" received generally positive reception from television critics, with Neal Justin of the Star Tribune concluding it was "the most brilliant episode in the series' history". According to the Nielsen ratings system, the episode was watched by 8.0 million households during its original broadcast, and received a 3.9 rating/9 share among viewers in the 18–49 demographic. In 2020 "Believe in the Stars" was one of three episodes being pulled from syndication and repeats due to the scene of Jenna wearing blackface.

== Plot ==
The episode starts with Liz Lemon (Tina Fey) announcing to her boss, Jack Donaghy (Alec Baldwin), that she needs to go to Chicago for jury duty because she is still registered to vote there. Jack gives Liz a powerful sedative for the trip. Later, NBC page Kenneth Parcell (Jack McBrayer) walks in on a meeting between Jack and the American silver medalist in tetherball, Tyler Brody (Remy Auberjonois). Tyler is angry at Jack for not selecting him as the gold medalist, and is threatening to go public with the revelation that there was no Olympic tetherball competition during the 2008 Summer Olympics, as it was staged to boost NBC's ratings. Jack makes a deal with Brody, but is bothered when Kenneth tells him that he no longer looks up to him over the morally grey actions. In an attempt to break Kenneth's moral absolutism, Jack stages a gambit where nine people are trapped in an elevator with enough air for eight, and Kenneth shows no hesitation in sacrificing himself. Jack concedes that Kenneth is better than him, and gives him a big screen television as a gift, but no cable hookup. Kenneth steals cable and later confesses to Jack, asking if SpongeBob SquarePants "is supposed to be terrifying".

Meanwhile, Jenna Maroney (Jane Krakowski) demands compensation for her voice work in Tracy Jordan's (Tracy Morgan) pornographic video game, Gorgasm: The Legend of Dong Slayer. The argument escalates and Liz orders them to stop their bickering. After Liz leaves for Chicago, Jenna and Tracy decide to conduct a social experiment to see whether Tracy can survive better as a white woman than Jenna can as a black man, after arguing respectively that black men and white women have it harder in society. Later, while on her flight, Liz takes Jack's sedative. Liz realizes that the woman sitting next to her is Oprah Winfrey. When Liz arrives back at the 30 Rock studios, Tracy is dressed in female drag with his body covered in white makeup and soon after, Jenna enters in blackface and male drag. Jack worries that the situation has gone out of control, but Liz assures him that Oprah, who is coming to the studios, will be able to make them come to terms. As it turns out, her inflight conversation with Oprah was a hallucination. The person who Liz thought was Oprah is actually a 12-year-old girl named Pam (Raven Goodwin). Even so, Pam engages Tracy and Jenna in a heart-to-heart, and manages to settle their differences.

== Production ==
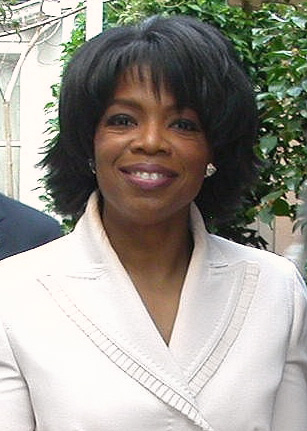
Oprah Winfrey guest starred in this episode.

"Believe in the Stars" was written by executive producer Robert Carlock and directed by series producer Don Scardino. This episode was Carlock's ninth writing credit, and was Scardino's fifteenth directed episode. "Believe in the Stars" originally aired in the United States on November 6, 2008 on NBC as the second episode of the show's third season and the 38th overall episode of the series.

In September 2008, it was announced that television host Oprah Winfrey would guest star on the show. She filmed her appearance on September 13, 2008. When Winfrey interviewed series creator Tina Fey on her show in November, Fey revealed that they shot their scene together on a Saturday, a day that the show normally does not film on. Actress Raven Goodwin played Pam, a 12-year-old girl that, while hallucinating, Liz Lemon believed was Oprah. Actor Remy Auberjonois played Olympic medalist Tyler Brody in this episode. This was actor Todd Buonopane's debut as the character Jeffrey Weinerslav, an NBC Human Resource mediator. In "Believe in the Stars", Jeffrey tries to mediate the disagreement that Jenna and Tracy are having over the video game. Buonopane later guest starred in the episodes "Cutbacks" and "Jackie Jormp-Jomp".

Star Wars is frequently referenced in 30 Rock, beginning with the pilot episode in 2006 where Tracy Jordan is seen shouting that he is a Jedi. Liz admits to being a huge fan of Star Wars, saying that she had watched it many times with Pete Hornberger (Scott Adsit), and dressed up as the Star Wars character Princess Leia during four recent Halloweens, and in this episode while trying to get out of jury duty in Chicago. Star Wars is also referenced when Tracy takes on the identity of the character Chewbacca. Fey, a fan of Star Wars herself, said that the weekly Star Wars joke or reference "started happening organically" when the crew realized that they had a Star Wars reference "in almost every show". She said that from then on "it became a thing where [they] tried to keep it going", and that even though they could not include one in every episode, they still had a "pretty high batting average". She attributed most of the references to Carlock, whom she described as "the resident expert".

== Reception ==
According to the Nielsen ratings system, "Believe in the Stars" was watched by 8.0 million households in its original American broadcast. It earned a 3.9 rating/9 share in the 18–49 demographic. This means that it was seen by 3.9 percent of all 18- to 49-year-olds, and 9 percent of all 18- to 49-year-olds watching television at the time of the broadcast. This was a decrease from the season premiere episode, "Do-Over", which was watched by 8.7 million American viewers. Nonetheless, this episode was the eighth highest-rated show on the NBC network during the week of November 3–9, 2008. Since airing, "Believe in the Stars" has received positive reception from television critics.

IGN contributor Robert Canning praised the episode, saying that it was "an absolutely perfect episode with not a moment wasted [and] equally hilarious were the storylines between Jack and Kenneth, and Tracy and Jenna. The episode had everything that makes 30 Rock great." Canning opined that Liz's admissions to Oprah Winfrey were "painfully funny", and that Tracy "was on fire" following his actions in this episode. In conclusion, Canning gave it a 10 out of 10 rating. Jeremy Medina of Paste was complimentary towards the episode, reporting that it had "madcap humor tirelessly delivered one joke after another at a lightning fast speed, adding up to one of the funniest episodes in the series." Medina enjoyed the social experiment between Jenna and Tracy, noting that it was "hilarious". TV Guide's Matt Mitovich commented that the episode was "Rock-solid", while Neal Justin of the Star Tribune believed it was "the most brilliant episode in the series' history". Television columnist Alan Sepinwall of The Star-Ledger wrote that "Believe in the Stars" belonged to Tina Fey "who has grown by leaps and bounds as an actress over the past few years. The Princess Leia voice, her drunken panic on the plane [...] and the religious fervor at the knowledge that Oprah would be coming to the studio were all hilarious, and played with the sort of confidence I don't know that she would have had at the start of the series."

The A.V. Club's Nathan Rabin said that the Jenna and Tracy subplot was not the most inspired idea, but admitted it introduced one of his "favorite gags in 30 Rock history" regarding two make-up artists giving Tracy a monster claw to use as a white hand when they ran out of white powder. Rabin called it a "brilliant gag." He was less enthusiastic with Winfrey in the episode, noting that her appearance "was treated as such a seismic cultural event that tonight's episode couldn't help but feel like a letdown." Bob Sassone of AOL's TV Squad wrote that "the least effective plot" in this episode was Jenna and Tracy's.
