= Do-Over =

- 30 Rock episode
- Episode no.: Season 3 Episode 1
- Directed by: Don Scardino
- Written by: Tina Fey
- Production code: 301
- Original air date: October 30, 2008

Guest appearances
- Will Arnett as Devon Banks; Marceline Hugot as Kathy Geiss; Megan Mullally as Bev

Episode chronology
← Previous "Cooter"	Next → "Believe in the Stars"
- 30 Rock season 3

"Do-Over" is the first episode of the third season of the American television comedy series 30 Rock, and the thirty-seventh episode overall. It was written by the series' creator, executive producer and lead actress, Tina Fey and directed by series producer Don Scardino. The episode originally aired on NBC in the United States on October 30, 2008. Guest stars in this episode include Will Arnett, Marceline Hugot, and Megan Mullally.

Liz Lemon (played by Fey) is being evaluated by Bev (Mullally) as a part of the adoption process while Jack Donaghy (Alec Baldwin) returns from his job in Washington, D.C., and tries to retake his position from Devon Banks (Arnett) at General Electric. Meanwhile, Jenna Maroney (Jane Krakowski) grows angry with Tracy Jordan (Tracy Morgan) for not compensating her for voice acting work on his successful adult video game.

"Do-Over" has received generally positive reception from television critics. According to the Nielsen Media Research, the episode was watched by 8.7 million households during its original broadcast, becoming 30 Rock's highest-rated episode, until the December 2008 episode "Christmas Special". "Do-Over" was nominated for an Art Directors Guild Production Design Award for "Single-Camera Television Series".

== Plot ==
As Liz Lemon is returning to studio 6H, the TGS with Tracy Jordan studio, she meets Jack Donaghy returning from Washington. Jack tells her that he intends to get his old job back and Liz tells him of her upcoming adoption evaluation. When he confronts Devon Banks in his office, Devon offers Jack a position in the mail room, laughing, but Jack accepts. Jack later tells Liz of his plan to work his way back to his old job through honest means, though Kathy Geiss (Marceline Hugot) shows a sexual interest in Jack he could leverage into a quicker promotion. When he discovers that Devon is planning to shut down GE, Jack, with Liz's help, convinces Kathy to hire him as her business adviser. Devon, realizing that he has been beaten, decides on a new path to securing his financial future: hurling himself in front of a series of moving cars so that he can sue the drivers.

Tracy Jordan's pornographic video game, Gorgasm: The Legend of Dong Slayer, has been very successfully released since it was developed in the previous episode "Cooter". He shows off a large royalty check and Jenna Maroney grows angry that she has not been compensated for her voice acting work in the game. Liz convinces him to make it up to her, and everyone else who helped him with the video game, by buying them presents. However, while everyone else receives extravagant gifts such as Frank getting gold-plated nunchucks and Pete getting a chinchilla fur coat, Jenna only gets a coupon for free hugs and decides to sue Tracy.

Following a home evaluation, Bev from the adoption agency comes to work with Liz where she checks the safety of the studio and interviews the TGS cast and crew including Jenna, Pete Hornberger (Scott Adsit), Frank Rossitano (Judah Friedlander), and Cerie Xerox (Katrina Bowden). The workplace evaluation goes badly, with many of the interviews reflecting badly on Liz or the safety of the studio for a child. However, before Bev files her report she sustains a head injury and forgets that she has done the evaluation. Liz gets the crew to help her "do over" the evaluation, hoping for a better result. This ultimately does not work, as Bev soon forgets the evaluations and has to be taken to a hospital. Later, Bev makes a full recovery, meaning Liz has to start over with another adoption agency, but she is glad Jack is back working in his old office.

== Production ==
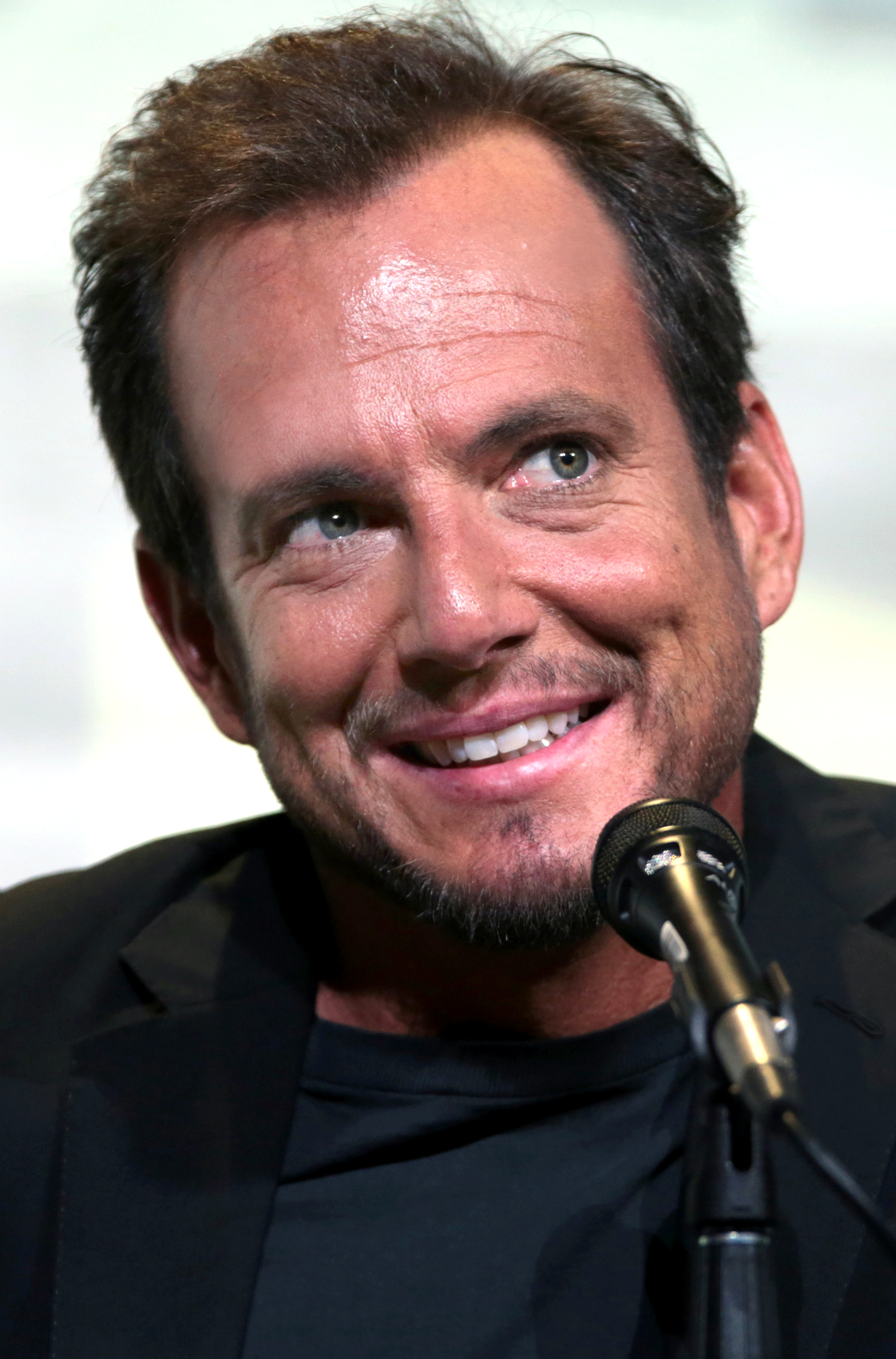
Will Arnett reprised his role as Devon Banks in this episode.

"Do-Over" was written by series creator, executive producer and lead actress Tina Fey, making it her thirteenth writing credit. The episode was directed by series producer Don Scardino, making it his fourteenth for the series. "Do-Over" originally aired in the United States on October 30, 2008, on NBC as the season premiere episode of the show's third season and the 37th overall episode of the series.

In September 2008, it was announced that actress Megan Mullally would guest star on 30 Rock. In this episode of 30 Rock, Mullally played Bev, a woman evaluating Liz Lemon as part of the adoption process. Actress Marceline Hugot made her fifth appearance as the character Kathy Geiss, the daughter of Don Geiss (Rip Torn), in the series. Comedy actor Will Arnett reprised his role as Devon Banks for the fourth time.

Four filmed scenes from "Do-Over" were cut out from the airing. Instead, the scenes were featured on 30 Rock's season three DVD as part of the deleted scenes in the Bonus features. In the first scene, Jack Donaghy plans to seduce Kathy so that he can get his old job back. The next scene, after Jack tells Liz he plans on reclaiming his former job back, Liz asks him how he will be able to get inside the 30 Rock building, as he does not have his employee ID card. Jack tells her you can do anything if you walk with confidence, which he does, and is permitted inside. Liz tries to do the same, but the guard asks her for ID, which she shows. In the third scene, Liz and Bev talk to NBC page Kenneth Parcell (Jack McBrayer). Kenneth is fascinated with the adoption process, and says that his own mother worked two jobs as an animal control person for the state and selling meats door-to-door. The final scene, Liz introduces Bev to Tracy in the "do over".

== Reception ==
According to the Nielsen Media Research, "Do-Over" was watched by 8.7 million households in its original American broadcast, and became the highest-rated episode of the series, until the December 11, 2008, episode of 30 Rock "Christmas Special". It earned a 4.1 rating/10 share in the 18–49 demographic. This means that it was seen by 4.1 percent of all 18- to 49-year-olds, and 10 percent of all 18- to 49-year-olds watching television at the time of the broadcast. "Do-Over" was nominated for an Art Directors Guild Production Design Award for "Single-Camera Television Series".

IGN contributor Robert Canning reviewed the episode, saying it "[set] the bar for the rest of the season" and was "filled to capacity with comedy." Jeremy Medina of Paste magazine commented that "Do-Over" was "sort of like the first day of school after summer vacation: sort of awkward at times, but fast and buoyant and warmly familiar all the same." Bob Sassone of AOL's TV Squad wrote "...this episode manages to do what the show has always done, mix crazy, almost surreal humor with a genuine (not manufactured) heart." TV Guide contributor Matt Mitovich enjoyed "Do-Over", and enjoyed Jack's story of trying to reclaim his job, along with Jack and Liz pretending to be a couple in front of Kathy. The A.V. Club's Nathan Rabin opined that premiere episodes "tend to be 30 Rock's Achilles Heel. But the show comes roaring out of the gate with 'Do-Over', a show that definitively breaks the premiere jinx." He said that the "frenetic farcical plotting" of Megan Mullally's character—in which she endured a disastrous trip to the 30 Rock studios, bumped her head, and lost her memory—"felt a little sitcommy but the laughs kept coming". In conclusion, Rabin gave this episode an A− grade rating.

Television columnist Alan Sepinwall for The Star-Ledger felt that the element's towards Jack getting his old job back were "fairly labored", but noted that Liz's adoption plot was "more solid from start to finish". He was complimentary towards the Kathy Geiss character, observing that her actions in the episode were "all frighteningly funny", and enjoyed Mullally's guest spot. In conclusion, Sepinwall said that this was not the best from the 30 Rock staff, but "they had some things they felt obligated to deal with, and there was more than enough comedy genius that I can't really complain."
