= Sandwich Day =

- 30 Rock episode
- Episode no.: Season 2 Episode 14
- Directed by: Don Scardino
- Written by: Robert Carlock; Jack Burditt
- Cinematography by: Vanja Černjul
- Production code: 214
- Original air date: May 1, 2008

Guest appearances
- Brian Dennehy as Mickey J; Jason Sudeikis as Floyd DeBarber; Rip Torn as Don Geiss; John Lutz as J.D. Lutz; Maulik Pancholy as Jonathan

Episode chronology
← Previous "Succession"	Next → "Cooter"
- 30 Rock season 2

"Sandwich Day" is the fourteenth episode of the second season of 30 Rock and the thirty-fifth episode overall. It was written by one of the season's executive producers, Robert Carlock, and one of the season's co-executive producers, Jack Burditt. The episode was directed by one of the season's producers, Don Scardino. The episode first aired on May 1, 2008 on the NBC network in the United States. Guest stars in this episode included Brian Dennehy, Marceline Hugot, Jason Sudeikis, and Rip Torn. The episode earned Tina Fey the Primetime Emmy Award for Outstanding Lead Actress in a Comedy Series.

Unusually this episode begins on the 30 Rock title sequence - there is no cold open as is normally the case.

This episode begins on the annual TGS with Tracy Jordan (a fictional sketch comedy series) Sandwich Day. Liz Lemon (Tina Fey) receives a phone call from her ex-boyfriend, Floyd (Jason Sudeikis), asking for a place to stay; Tracy Jordan (Tracy Morgan), Jenna Maroney (Jane Krakowski) and the TGS writers try to get a new sandwich for Liz; Jack Donaghy (Alec Baldwin) reconsiders his future at General Electric.

== Plot ==
It is the annual Sandwich Day for the crew of TGS. The Teamsters, led by Mickey J. (Brian Dennehy), bring in "secret" sandwiches from an unknown Italian delicatessen in Brooklyn. When the writers eat Liz's sandwich, Liz threatens that she will "cut [their] faces up so bad [...] [they'll] all have chins." As a result, the writers and Tracy, aided by Jenna, enter a drinking contest against the Teamsters in an attempt to get Liz a new sandwich.

Floyd, who broke up with Liz in the episode "Hiatus", calls Liz to ask if he can have a place to stay, as he has come to visit New York City on business. Liz tries to win Floyd back, only for him to lie to her about going home to Cleveland, Ohio. Floyd eventually travels home, and the pair agree to remain friends.

Meanwhile, after being ousted from his office on the 52nd floor by Devon Banks (Will Arnett), Jack is not taking well to his new job on the 12th floor. He later decides to move to Washington, D.C., to be the new "Homeland Security Director for Crisis and Weather Management."

== Production ==
This episode was primarily filmed on April 1, 2008. This episode was the fourth episode written by Burditt and the seventh written by Carlock. The episode was the twelfth episode which was directed by Don Scardino.

== Reception ==
"Sandwich Day" brought in an average of 5.4 million viewers. The episode also achieved a 2.6/7 in the key 18- to 49-year-old demographic. The 2.6 refers to 2.6% of all 18- to 49-year-olds in the U.S., and the 7 refers to 7% of all 18- to 49-year-olds watching television at the time of the broadcast in the U.S.

Robert Canning of IGN wrote that this episode "turned out to be an absolute winner". He concluded that "with its more relatable storylines and moments like the eerie-voiced guy at the hospital, Liz tipping tables for her mac and cheese, and watching an entire sandwich be eaten in real time in the airport security line, 'Sandwich Day' was a definite highlight in the post-writers' strike season." Erin Fox of TV Guide said that "the minor story of the episode was probably the funniest". Jeff Labrecque of Entertainment Weekly thought that this episode "was nothing more than...eh". He called this episode a "weak link".
