= John Riggi =

American television writer

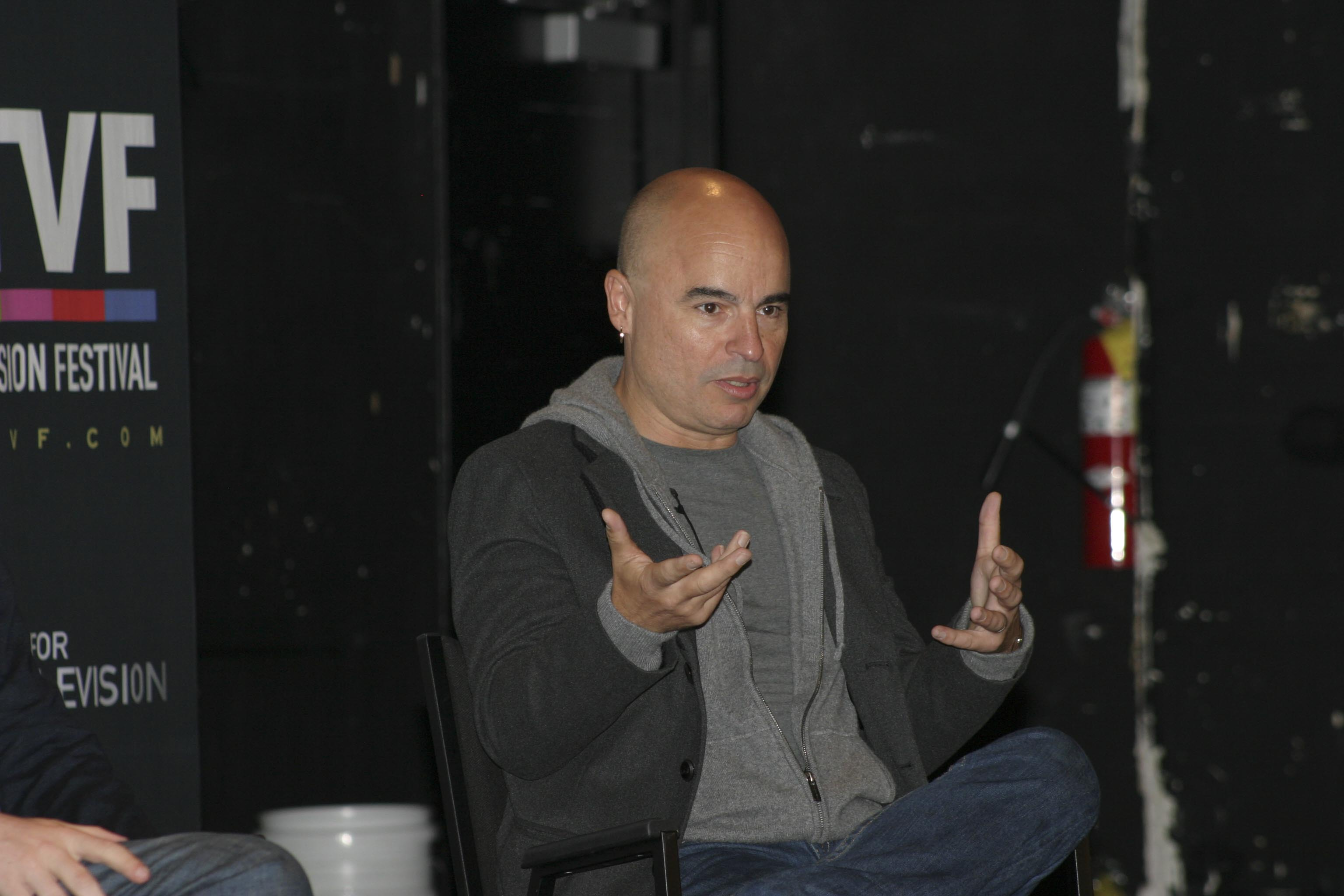
Riggi at the 2009 New York Television Festival

John Riggi is an American television writer, producer, director, and actor who has worked on various television shows. He is from Cincinnati, Ohio. He attended high school at Elder High School, in Cincinnati, OH, and graduated from the University of Cincinnati in 1978 with a degree in biology.

He has worked as a writer on the NBC comedy series 30 Rock. He was nominated for the Writers Guild of America Award for Best Comedy Series at the February 2009 ceremony for his work on the third season of 30 Rock.

== Writing work ==
- The Four Seasons (2025)
- The Other Two (2021)
- Camping (2018)
- American Woman (2018)
- The Comeback (2014)
- Super Fun Night (2013-2014)
- Partners (2013)
- 30 Rock (2006-2013)
- The Bernie Mac Show (2004)
- Charlie Lawrence (2003)
- My Guide to Becoming a Rock Star (2002)
- Family Guy (1999)
- Five Houses (1998)
- The Larry Sanders Show (1993-1997)
- The 1994 Billboard Music Awards (1994)
- The 46th Annual Primetime Emmy Awards (1994)
- 1993 MTV Movie Awards (1993)
- The 45th Annual Primetime Emmy Awards (1993)
- The Dennis Miller Show (1992)
- One Night Stand (1992)
