= The Ones (30 Rock) =

- 30 Rock episode
- Episode no.: Season 3 Episode 19
- Directed by: Beth McCarthy
- Written by: Jack Burditt
- Production code: 319
- Original air date: April 23, 2009

Guest appearances
- Josh Casaubon as Roger; Salma Hayek as Elisa Pedrera; Brian Williams as himself

Episode chronology
← Previous "Jackie Jormp-Jomp"	Next → "The Natural Order"
- 30 Rock season 3

"The Ones" is the nineteenth episode of the third season of the American television comedy series 30 Rock. It was written by co-executive producer Jack Burditt, and directed by Beth McCarthy. The episode aired in the United States on April 23, 2009, on NBC. Guest stars in this episode include Josh Casaubon, Salma Hayek, and Brian Williams.

In the episode, Jack Donaghy (Alec Baldwin) goes shopping with Liz Lemon (Tina Fey) for an engagement ring for Elisa (Hayek). Jack grows worried about whether he and Elisa's potential marriage could survive in the real world, but Tracy Jordan (Tracy Morgan) counsels him on married life. Meanwhile, Elisa tells Liz that she is keeping a secret from Jack. A prank results in an injury back at TGS and Jenna Maroney (Jane Krakowski) falls in love with an attractive emergency medical technician (Casaubon) who comes to help.

"The Ones" received generally mixed reception. According to the Nielsen ratings system, it was watched by 6.3 million households during its original broadcast, and received a 3.9 rating/6 share among viewers in the 18–49 demographic. For her performance in this episode, Krakowski received a Primetime Emmy Award nomination in the category for Outstanding Supporting Actress in a Comedy Series.

== Plot ==
Jack Donaghy (Alec Baldwin) is planning to marry his girlfriend Elisa (Salma Hayek) as he believes she is "the one", but Elisa tells Liz Lemon (Tina Fey) she has a secret. After asking Liz to tell Jack of her reluctance to get married, Elisa kisses Liz and walks away. Liz simply says "I see why he (Jack) likes it". She confesses to Jack and Liz that she killed her first husband in a crime of passion after he cheated on her, and did not go to prison because she could not get an impartial jury due to her consequent notoriety. Jack considers marrying her anyway, saying that love requires one to overlook another's flaws, but worries about what would happen if he would ever be unfaithful. Tracy Jordan (Tracy Morgan) tells Jack that he has never cheated on his wife, Angie (Sherri Shepherd), which makes Jack think that he too can be faithful. However, when Elisa grows too suspicious of Jack's relationship with Liz, he calls off the engagement.

Meanwhile, at the 30 Rock studios, Frank Rossitano (Judah Friedlander) and James "Toofer" Spurlock (Keith Powell) decide to play a prank on J. D. Lutz (John Lutz), which results in Lutz getting hurt, after a flat-screen monitor falls on top of him. Jenna Maroney (Jane Krakowski) becomes romantically interested in one of the paramedics (Josh Casaubon), but unsure of how to contact him, tries to bring him to the studio by giving the show's page, Kenneth Parcell (Jack McBrayer), strawberries, which triggers his allergies. Kenneth willingly consumes some, after Jenna tells him that the paramedic might be "the one", only for Jenna to decide against having a relationship with the paramedic because he has custody of a young son.

== Production ==
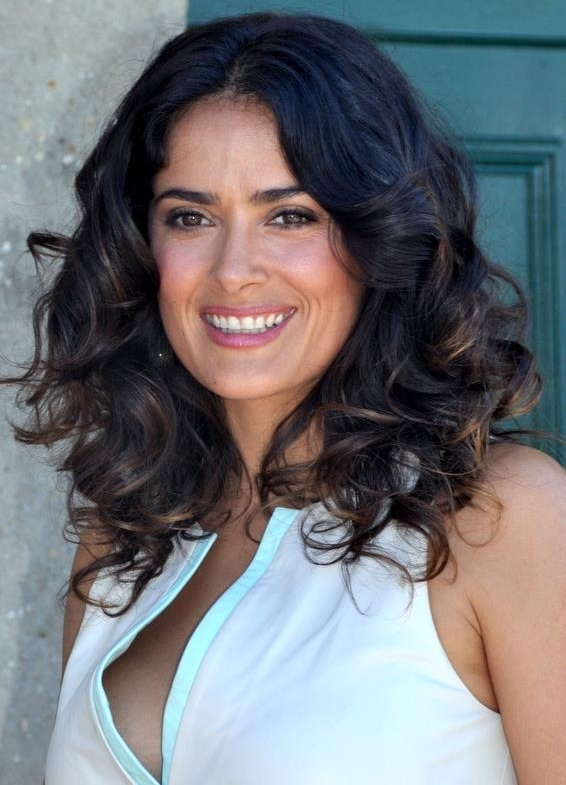
This episode was Salma Hayek's last guest appearance on 30 Rock until the series finale in 2013

"The Ones" was written by co-executive producer Jack Burditt, and directed by Beth McCarthy, a long-time television director who worked with series creator Tina Fey on the sketch comedy show Saturday Night Live. This was Burditt's tenth writing credit, and was McCarthy's sixth directed episode. "The Ones" originally aired on NBC in the United States on April 23, 2009.

At the beginning of the episode, Jack and Liz are at a jewelry store, as Jack is searching for an engagement ring for Elisa. They shot that scene in a Cartier store in New York's Fifth Avenue, which was filmed on February 22, 2009. A scene featuring Sue LaRoche-Van der Hout (Sue Galloway) as the Grim Reaper, in which Jenna is led to believe Kenneth has gone into shock because of the strawberries, was cut from the airing. According to Jane Krakowski, in the DVD commentary for this episode, there were alternate scenes with Jenna letting Kenneth know about the tampering she did to Kenneth's items, his chickpea, water bottle, and harmonica.

"The Ones" was actress Salma Hayek's final guest appearance on 30 Rock. Her first appearance on the show was in the episode "Señor Macho Solo", as a nurse for Jack's mother and love interest for him. She next guest-starred in the episodes "Flu Shot", "Generalissimo", "St. Valentine's Day", and "Larry King".

News anchor Brian Williams, of NBC Nightly News, guest-starred as himself in this episode. In a scene with Tracy and Jack at a club, Tracy reveals to Jack that he has been giving out his phone number to different women, though it is not his real number, which results in Williams receiving the calls.

== Cultural references ==
Kenneth revealing that his real name is "Dick Whitman" is a reference to the main character Don Draper of Mad Men (played by Jon Hamm, who had a recurring role on 30 Rock earlier in the season). "Earn this", spoken by Kenneth as Jenna has poisoned him again, references the 1998 film Saving Private Ryan when actor Tom Hanks says the same words to actor Matt Damon's title character. When she is told that Kenneth has gone into a severe allergic shock and needs to have his hands cut off, Jenna apologizes to him for what she has done, telling him "I'm just a girl standing in front of a boy she poisoned so this other boy would go to town on her", which Jenna misquotes from actress Julia Roberts' character from the romantic comedy Notting Hill (1999). After Kenneth drinks his strawberry water, as he risked his life so that Jenna can meet the paramedic again, Jenna says to Kenneth "You magnificent sonofabitch!", a line quoted by actor George C. Scott in the American biographical war film Patton (1970). Kenneth blows white smoke out while referencing bringing back something from "the other side" (death) echoes the same look when actor Haley Joel Osment remarked "I see dead people" in the movie The Sixth Sense (1999).

The final three clips in the montage of Tracy taking off his shirt are real clips from Tracy Morgan interviews. Also, Elisa wears a "What the Frak?!" Battlestar Galactica t-shirt, as she admits her secret to Jack and Liz. "It's not product placement—I just like it!", says Liz to Jack, after he storms into her office and she is wearing a Slanket, a sleeved blanket with sleeves usually made of fleece material.

== Reception ==
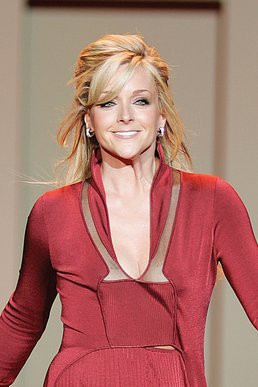
Jane Krakowski received an Emmy nomination for Outstanding Supporting Actress in a Comedy Series for her performance in this episode.

In its original American broadcast, "The Ones" was watched by 6.3 million households, according to the Nielsen ratings system. It earned a 3.9 rating/6 share in the 18–49 demographic. This means that it was seen by 3.9% of all 18- to 49-year-olds, and 6% of all 18- to 49-year-olds watching television at the time of the broadcast. It was the eighth highest-rated show on the NBC network that week, while it finished in 19th place—tied with episodes of Brothers & Sisters, The Celebrity Apprentice, and Heroes—in the weekly ratings for the week of April 20–26, 2009. Jane Krakowski received a Primetime Emmy Award nomination for Outstanding Supporting Actress in a Comedy Series at the 61st Primetime Emmy Awards for her work in this episode, but lost it to actress Kristin Chenoweth.

Since airing, the episode has received mixed reviews from television critics. IGN contributor Robert Canning rated the episode an 8 out of 10, saying it "gave all the main characters an opportunity to shine" and that the episode "delivered some great laughs and elevated some standard sit-com plots to a much funnier level." He argued that Liz helped make the episode good. Though, Canning found Elisa's secret disappointing and felt that Salma Hayek's exit from the show too much like a conventional sitcom. Entertainment Weekly's Aly Semigran wrote that the episode gave good character revelations about Tracy, Jenna, and Kenneth, but that episode did not exceed expectations from the previous week's episode, "Jackie Jormp-Jomp". Writing for The Star-Ledger Alan Sepinwall reported that despite the episode not being a 30 Rock classic it "had more than enough funny things in it to keep me satisfied." The A.V. Club's Nathan Rabin wrote that "The Ones" felt "a little stock" but that it was "just pretty good." He further added that "the one" gag featured in this episode "was mildly amusing but a little obvious." He felt that Elisa's secret felt more like a Soap opera secret than a 30 Rock one. Nonetheless, Rabin gave "The Ones" a B−. David Bauder of the Guelph Mercury, however, was complimentary towards Hayek's guest appearances throughout season 3, noting, that they are "the best this absurdist comedy has to offer. Hayek throws herself into her role with gusto, matching Tina Fey and Alec Baldwin step for silly step".

Jenna's storyline in the episode received mixed reception. Canning enjoyed her subplot but found it predictable and stereotypical, while Sepinwall reported it did not work, and wrote that Jenna's stories need to have Liz or Jack featured prominently or that she be put with Scott Adsit's 30 Rock character, Pete Hornberger, as in this episode, "as her insanity's only amusing when contrasted against a relatively normal character. As with Sepinwall, Bob Sassone of AOL's TV Squad believed Jenna's subplot was fair, observing it was great in parts but "it just went on too long and got tedious and silly." He believed it would be a good idea to have Jenna dating or perhaps marrying a recurring character, but opined "The Ones" did not choose that path. Tom O'Neil from the Los Angeles Times, in an August 2009 article, was thrilled for Krakowski receiving an Emmy nomination for her work on 30 Rock, but felt that "The Ones" would not be the episode for which she'd win the Outstanding Supporting Actress award.
