= Jackie Jormp-Jomp =

- 30 Rock episode
- Episode no.: Season 3 Episode 18
- Directed by: Don Scardino
- Written by: Kay Cannon; Tracey Wigfield
- Production code: 318
- Original air date: April 16, 2009

Guest appearances
- Todd Buonopane as Jeffrey Weinerslav; Kerry Butler as Lyle; Danielle Flora as Daphne; Mary Catherine Garrison as Erin; Christina Gausas as Jenny; Elizabeth Marvel as Emily

Episode chronology
← Previous "Cutbacks"	Next → "The Ones"
- 30 Rock season 3

"Jackie Jormp-Jomp" is the eighteenth episode of the third season of the American television series 30 Rock. It was directed by series producer Don Scardino, and written by executive story editor Kay Cannon and script co-coordinator Tracey Wigfield. The episode originally aired on NBC in the United States on April 16, 2009. Guest stars in the episode include Todd Buonopane, Kerry Butler, Danielle Flora, Mary Catherine Garrison, Christina Gausas, and Elizabeth Marvel.

In the episode, Liz Lemon (Tina Fey) meets a new group of friends (Butler, Garrison, Gausas, and Marvel) while on suspension from work. Meanwhile, Jack Donaghy (Alec Baldwin) is worried that Jenna Maroney's (Jane Krakowski) Janis Joplin biographical film will not get released and tries to promote the movie at the Kids' Choice Awards. However, following a mix-up, the world believes Jenna is dead and Jack tries to use her death to further hype the film.

"Jackie Jormp-Jomp" received generally positive reception from television critics. According to the Nielsen ratings system, the episode was watched by 7.324 million households during its original broadcast, and received a 3.5 rating/9 share among viewers in the 18–49 demographic.

== Plot ==
A sexual harassment complaint was made against Liz Lemon (Tina Fey) in the previous episode, and she must take a sexual harassment training as a result. In addition, she cannot return to work until she is done with her training. Liz, however, cannot handle life without work, as she needs the stress. Her attitude changes when she meets one of her neighbors, Emily (Elizabeth Marvel). She understands how Liz feels because she was just like Liz and tells her there are better ways to live. Liz hangs out with Emily and her friends (Mary Catherine Garrison, Kerry Butler, and Christina Gausas), who spend the majority of their time getting spa treatments and going shopping. Liz gets so caught up in their lifestyle that she forgets to watch her show, The Girlie Show with Tracy Jordan (TGS). Not wanting to come back to work—as she is intrigued by her new friends' lifestyle—Liz sexually harasses her counselor, Jeffrey Weinerslav (Todd Buonopane). She goes back to hanging out with Emily and her friends, but soon discovers that they are a Girl Fight Club, which disappoints Liz. In order for her to get out, Liz needs to fight them.

Meanwhile, Jack Donaghy (Alec Baldwin) informs Jenna Maroney (Jane Krakowski) that her unlicensed Janis Joplin biopic is hard to sell due to test audiences not liking it. They decide to up the PR by going to the Kids Choice Awards where Jenna discovers that she is dead. She is accidentally put in the memorial montage at the show, which Jack decides to use as an advantage for the film. He tells her that all she has to do is stay out of the public eye until he sells the movie. At the same time, all employees from the 30 Rock building need to disclose any inter-office relationships. NBC page Kenneth Parcell (Jack McBrayer) discloses that he fantasizes about marrying a TGS dancer, named Daphne (Danielle Flora), but discovers that "Dot Com" Slattery (Kevin Brown) is dating her. A minor conflict ensues between them, but ends when Tracy Jordan (Tracy Morgan) decides to mediate this. As a result, Tracy fires Daphne, but this backfires when the other dancers refuse to work. This prompts Tracy to solve this problem by hiring new dancers.

Jack tells TGS producer, Pete Hornberger (Scott Adsit), to do an on-air tribute of Jenna on the show. On the TGS set, a huge poster of Jenna is hung with her real birthday and death date. When Jenna sees that her real birth date is displayed, she comes out of hiding and appears on stage to cover the poster. After witnessing this, Liz confronts Jenna and Tracy for their behavior, but is glad to be back at work.

== Production ==
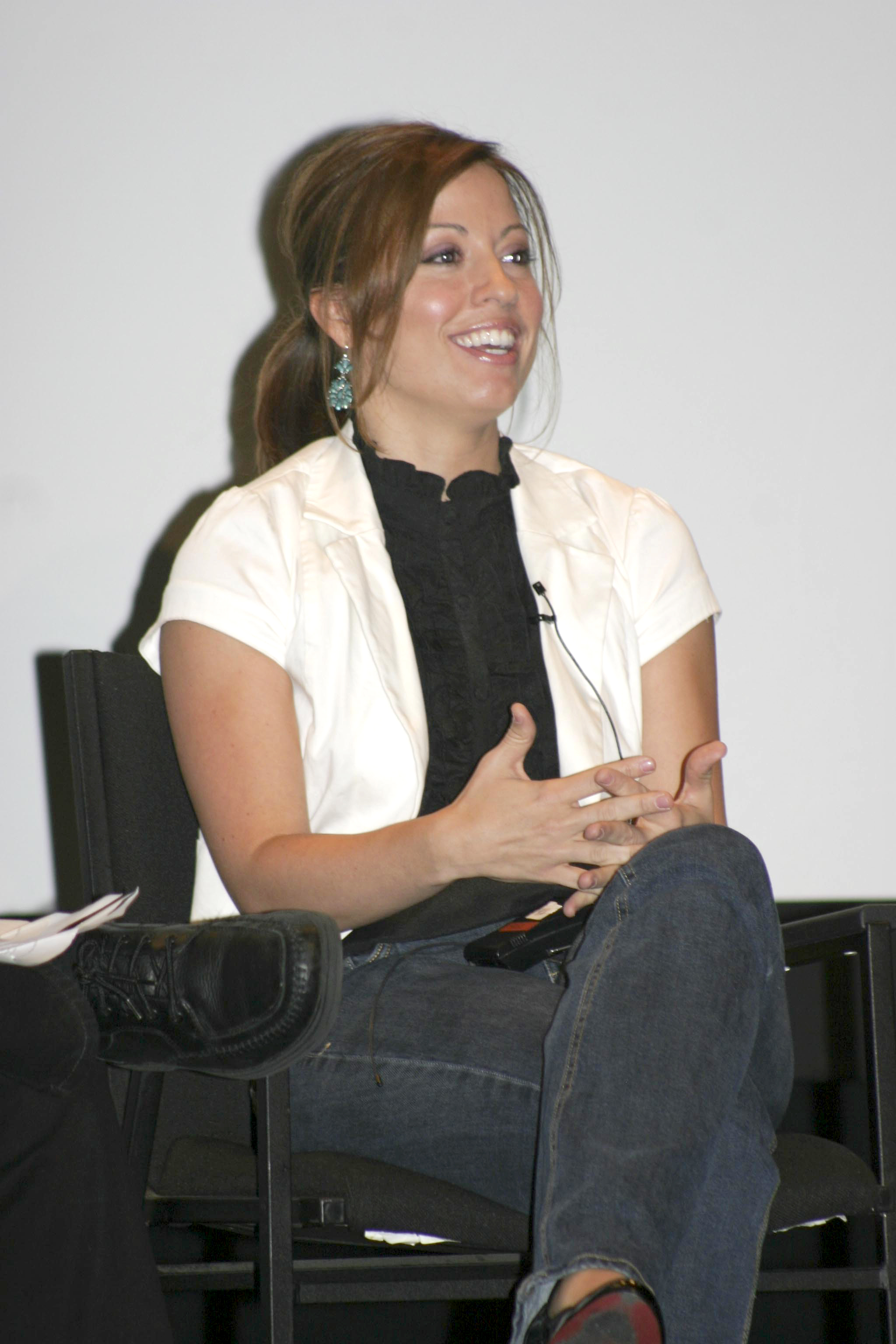
Kay Cannon (pictured) wrote "Jackie Jormp-Jomp" along with co-writer Tracey Wigfield.

"Jackie Jormp-Jomp" was directed by series producer Don Scardino, and written by executive story editor Kay Cannon and script co-coordinator Tracey Wigfield. This was Cannon's fourth writing credit, having written the episodes "Black Tie", "Somebody to Love", and "Christmas Special", and was Wigfield's first writing credit. This was Scardino's nineteenth directed episode. "Jackie Jormp-Jomp" originally aired on April 16, 2009, on NBC in the United States as the eighteenth episode of the show's third season.

"Jackie Jormp-Jomp" was filmed on February 11, 2009. This was the last time the show referenced Jenna trying to play singer Janis Joplin in a feature film. This plot first began in the January 8, 2009, episode "Señor Macho Solo" in which Jenna auditions to play the singer in a biographical movie. This was actor Todd Buonopane's third appearance as the character Jeffrey Weinerslav, an NBC Human Resource mediator. Buonopane previously appeared in the season three episodes "Believe in the Stars" and "Cutbacks". In this episode, Today show co-host Meredith Vieira is referenced, in which Kenneth reveals that Vieira made him eat an unripe banana in front of her, which Kenneth believes was sexual harassment. Vieira has played herself in the series numerous times. During the on air tribute for Jenna in "Jackie Jormp-Jomp", a 1980s Cling Free commercial featuring Jane Krakowski aired as part of Jenna's youth as a child star.

== Reception ==
In its original American broadcast, "Jackie Jormp-Jomp" was watched by 7.324 million households, according to the Nielsen ratings system. It also achieved a 3.5 rating/9 share in the key 18- to 49-year-old demographic. This means that it was seen by 3.5 percent of all 18- to 49-year-olds, and 9 percent of all 18- to 49-year-olds watching television at the time of the broadcast. This episode went up 7 percent from the previous episode, "Cutbacks", and was the sixth highest-rated show on the NBC network that week.

"Jackie Jormp-Jomp" was well received among television critics. Entertainment Weekly's Aly Semingran thought that the episode "had the most laughs-per-minute than any other episode this season". Television columnist Alan Sepinwall for The Star-Ledger praised "Jackie Jormp-Jomp", describing it as "one of the better 30 Rock's of late" and said that it featured "a good character arc" for Liz, "a too-rare pairing" between Jenna and Jack, and a "great tie-it-all-together climax" in which Liz "giddy and bruised" terrifies Jenna and Tracy upon her return. The A.V. Club's Nathan Rabin felt that it was "very solid" and gave it a B+. Bob Sassone of AOL's TV Squad said it was "great to see" the show carry its two plots, from previous episodes—Liz's sexual harassment and Jenna's movie—in "Jackie Jormp-Jomp". Rick Porter of Zap2it was complimentary towards the episode, citing that it was a "pretty absurd episode of the show and [made] it all that much funnier." Porter enjoyed Jenna's story, including the pairing of her and Jack, writing that it "worked really well" and "played both to Jenna's endless well of vanity and her utter ignorance of how to work the PR machine". He opined that this episode "better showcased" Jane Krakowski in the season.
