= St. Valentine's Day (30 Rock) =

- 30 Rock episode
- Episode no.: Season 3 Episode 11
- Directed by: Don Scardino
- Written by: Jack Burditt; Tina Fey
- Production code: 311
- Original air date: February 12, 2009

Guest appearances
- Marylouise Burke as Mrs. Baird; Jon Hamm as Drew Baird; Salma Hayek as Elisa Del Valle; Zak Orth as a priest; Laila Robins as Gloria Baird; Maria Thayer as Jennifer Rogers; Allie Trimm as Bethany Baird; Karen Pittman as Nurse

Episode chronology
← Previous "Generalissimo"	Next → "Larry King"
- 30 Rock season 3

"St. Valentine's Day" is the eleventh episode of the third season, and forty-seventh episode overall, of the American television comedy series 30 Rock. It was written by co-executive producer Jack Burditt and series' creator, executive producer and lead actress Tina Fey. The director of this episode was series producer Don Scardino. The episode originally aired on NBC in the United States on February 12, 2009. Guest stars in "St. Valentine's Day" include Marylouise Burke, Jon Hamm, Salma Hayek, Zak Orth, Laila Robins, Maria Thayer, and Allie Trimm.

In the episode, Liz Lemon (Fey) insists that she and Dr. Drew Baird (Hamm) have their first official date on Valentine's Day, while Jack Donaghy (Alec Baldwin) prepares himself for an unconventional Valentine's Day spent at church with his girlfriend Elisa (Hayek). Finally, Tracy Jordan (Tracy Morgan) tries to help Kenneth Parcell (Jack McBrayer) win the affections of a new staffer (Thayer). This episode also continued a story arc involving Drew as a love interest for Liz, which began in the previous episode.

"St. Valentine's Day" has received generally positive reviews from television critics. According to the Nielsen Media Research, the episode was watched by 7.6 million households during its original broadcast, and received a 3.8 rating among viewers in the 18–49 demographic.

== Plot ==
Liz (Tina Fey) invites her neighbor, Dr. Drew Baird (Jon Hamm), on their first date, accidentally scheduling it for Valentine's Day. At the suggestion of her boss, Jack (Alec Baldwin), Liz decides to have the date at her home. Many things go wrong during the date, including Liz exposing her breast and Drew seeing Liz on the toilet. The date gets worse when Drew's ex-wife drops off their daughter (Allie Trimm) at Liz's apartment. Later, Drew gets news that his mother (Marylouise Burke) is critically ill. The two visit her at the hospital and after Drew steps out, Liz is left alone with her. She tells Liz she is in fact not Drew's mother, but instead his grandmother, and that his sister (Laila Robins) is really his birth mother. Following the passing of his grandmother, Liz and Drew still decide to move forward in their relationship, and Liz telling Drew everything his grandmother told her.

Meanwhile, Jack's Valentine's dinner plans with his girlfriend Elisa (Salma Hayek) are postponed when they have to attend church. Jack calls his office assistant, Jonathan (Maulik Pancholy), telling him to hold his dinner reservations. Before they can leave church, Elisa tells Jack that they need to go to confession. After horrifying the priest (Zak Orth) with his admissions, Elisa becomes furious with Jack and breaks up with him. Later, however, she laments her fight with Jack. After finding a McFlurry coupon in the collection plate, she believes it is a sign from God because both she and Jack love the McDonald's dessert. The two reconcile their relationship as a result, and spend Valentine's Day together at a McDonald's.

Finally, Kenneth (Jack McBrayer) falls for a new staffer, a blind woman named Jennifer (Maria Thayer). Kenneth cannot bring himself to ask Jennifer out, so Tracy (Tracy Morgan) decides to help him. On their date, at the 30 Rock studios, Kenneth and Jennifer are joined by Tracy—who does all the talking. Jennifer believes Kenneth is black, but Kenneth reveals he is white and expresses his feeling for her, and admits to her that Tracy was doing all the talking. Jennifer tells him she does not mind of what has happened. However, after feeling Kenneth's face and comparing it to her own, she leaves, horrified at his appearance.

== Production ==
"St. Valentine's Day" was written by co-executive producer Jack Burditt and series' creator, executive producer and lead actress Tina Fey. The director of this episode was series producer Don Scardino. It originally aired on NBC in the United States on February 12, 2009.

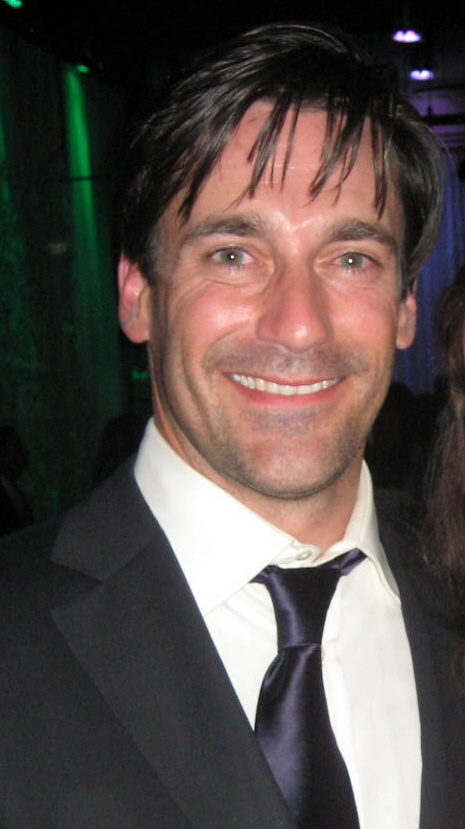
Jon Hamm made his second guest appearance on the show in this episode.

In October 2008, when actor Jon Hamm hosted the sketch comedy show Saturday Night Live (SNL), negotiations took place with the show's producers for him to guest star on 30 Rock. In December 2008, it was confirmed Hamm would appear as a love interest for Fey's character, Liz Lemon. It was also announced by NBC that Hamm would star in a three episode arc. He made his debut in the episode "Generalissimo" as Dr. Drew Baird, a neighbor and date of Liz Lemon. His last appearance was in "The Bubble" where Liz and Drew break-up. Hamm later appeared in the season four episodes "Anna Howard Shaw Day" and "Emanuelle Goes to Dinosaur Land".

In an interview with Entertainment Weekly, Fey said when the writing staff is developing a script, "We'll have an actor in mind and we'll keep referring to them. Like for this we said, 'Then Hamm comes in, blah blah blah.'" She believed that there was no possibility of getting Hamm, but "we were lucky with the timing because Mad Men was on hiatus and he was hosting SNL. So I called over there and asked them [whispering], 'Hey, is that guy funny? Tell me the truth.' And they were like, 'Yes, he's really funny.' By Saturday I knew they were right."

This episode was actress Salma Hayek's fourth appearance on 30 Rock. She first appeared in the episode "Señor Macho Solo" as a nurse for Jack Donaghy's mother and love interest for Jack. She made appearances in the episodes "Flu Shot" and "Generalissimo". Actress Maria Thayer starred in the 2008 comedy film Forgetting Sarah Marshall as the wife of a character played by Jack McBrayer, who plays Kenneth Parcell on 30 Rock.

In order to shoot a scene in a McDonald's chain restaurant, the show approached executives from the restaurant, in advance, for permission. The executives looked over the "St. Valentine's Day" script and gave them permission. The scene was filmed at a McDonald's franchise in New York City.

Two filmed scenes from "St. Valentine's Day" were cut out from the airing. Instead, the scenes were featured on 30 Rock’s season 3 DVD as part of the deleted scenes in the bonus feature. In the first scene, Kenneth tells Tracy that he cannot go through his date with Jennifer as he does not want to deceive Jennifer, as the plan is that Tracy will do all the talking for Kenneth during the date. Tracy, however, tells Kenneth that no deceiving will occur and that he will be honest during the date. Kenneth is still not convinced about the whole idea, but Tracy manages to change his mind. In the second scene, Jack and Elisa are in church. Jack intrigued with what has happened during church is ready to leave, though, Elisa tells him that the sermon is almost over, but that the service is about to begin.

== Reception ==
According to the Nielsen Media Research, "St. Valentine's Day" was watched by 7.6 million households in its original American broadcast. It earned a 3.8 rating/9 share in the 18–49 demographic. This means that it was seen by 3.8% of all 18- to 49-year-olds, and 9% of all 18- to 49-year-olds watching television at the time of the broadcast. "St. Valentine's Day" finished in 37th place in the weekly ratings for the week of February 9–15, 2009.

Robert Canning of IGN reported that the Valentine's Day theme in the episode "was exactly what you would expect from a series that thrives on uncomfortable romantic situations." He added that there was a lot to enjoy from "St. Valentine's Day," opining that it was a "very funny episode" and that it had "plenty of get moments and memorable lines to make the weak endings a minor factor." Canning rated the episode an 8.4 out of 10. Alan Sepinwall of The Star-Ledger said that the episode was "structurally and tonally", but disliked the way the show featured Jon Hamm, as he believed the show was not giving him enough to do besides being "handsome." Nonetheless, Sepinwall enjoyed the story between Liz and Drew in "St. Valentine's Day" writing that it was a "better effort" than shown in the previous episode, "Generalissimo". As with Sepinwall, Maureen Ryan for the Chicago Tribune hoped the show would use Hamm "better" than demonstrated in his first two appearances. Entertainment Weekly contributor Annie Barrett wrote that she liked the way the episode handled the Valentine's Day theme, however, was not complimentary towards the way Tina Fey and Hamm were featured in "St. Valentine's Day" with her observing, "the future for TV's most promisingly delicious couple ... might not be so sweet." Before the airing of the episode, Barrett very much liked the pairing of the two characters. Kevin D. Thompson for The Palm Beach Post was complimentary about the episode's theme, and praised 30 Rock for displaying "one of the best" episodes he has ever seen. Jeremy Median of Paste praised the episodes "Generalissimo" and "St. Valentine's Day", concluding, "There's no possible way to mention every funny joke or one-liner in the past two episodes. The show is just too lightning-quick for that."

TV Squad's Bob Sassone hoped that the storyline involving Jack and Elisa would be over, "because we all know the relationship isn't going anywhere." He, however, noted that it was not a "bad subplot" with the pairing of Kenneth and Tracy, but that his "favorite part" of "St. Valentine's Day" was Jenna Maroney's (Jane Krakowski) impersonation of singer Michael McDonald. James Poniewozik for Time was not a fan of Salma Hayek's character, as she was not "adding much to the show." Poniewozik wrote that her character in this episode was the first time she seemed to be a "fully contributing part of the ensemble." Jack's scene in the church, along with him once claiming he was God in a deposition—a reference to Alec Baldwin's role in the film Malice (1993)—was well received, with Canning concluding that these traits make for "an instant classic Jack Donaghy moment."

Many did not enjoy the addition of the McFlurry dessert in "St. Valentine's Day" as many believed it was product placement. Though, Advertising Age reported that McDonald's did not pay to have their dessert in the episode, stating that it was all part of the script. Fey also denied the product placement allegations. She said that the show did not receive money and worried that the McDonald's Corporation might sue them. A McDonald's commercial that appeared within the half-hour was "part of our traditional media buy" and that no advertising "was moved around specifically to be near" the "St. Valentine's Day" airing, explained Jennifer Lane Landolt, director-entertainment alliances for McDonald's.
