= Standards and Practices (disambiguation) =

In the US, Broadcast Standards and Practices (often abbreviated to omit the first word) is the department at a television network which is responsible for moral, ethical, and legal issues.

Standards and Practices may also refer to:

- Standards & Practices (album) by American punk rock band Face to Face
- "Standards and Practices" (30 Rock), an episode of the American comedy series 30 Rock
- Standards and Practices, a previous name for the professional wrestling tag team The West Hollywood Blondes

== See also ==
- Standards and Recommended Practices in the aviation industry
