= The Funcooker =

- 30 Rock episode
- Episode no.: Season 3 Episode 14
- Directed by: Ken Whittingham
- Written by: Tom Ceraulo; Donald Glover
- Production code: 314
- Original air date: March 12, 2009

Guest appearances
- Jackie Hoffman as Rochelle Gaulke; Nancy O'Dell as herself; Chris Parnell as Dr. Leo Spaceman

Episode chronology
← Previous "Goodbye, My Friend"	Next → "The Bubble"
- 30 Rock season 3

"The Funcooker" is the fourteenth episode of the third season of the American television comedy series 30 Rock. It was written by Tom Ceraulo and Donald Glover, and directed by Ken Whittingham. The episode originally aired on NBC on March 12, 2009. Guest stars in this episode include Jackie Hoffman, Nancy O'Dell, and Chris Parnell.

In the episode, Liz Lemon (Tina Fey) leaves The Girlie Show with Tracy Jordan (TGS) crew unmanaged as she must participate in jury duty for the trial of an oddly familiar woman (Hoffman). NBC page Kenneth Parcell (Jack McBrayer) tries to assert control over the crew in her stead and Jack Donaghy (Alec Baldwin) uses the writers to develop a new name for a General Electric product. Meanwhile, Jenna Maroney (Jane Krakowski) seeks Dr. Leo Spaceman's (Parnell) help so she can work on TGS and her movie.

"The Funcooker" received generally positive reviews from television critics. According to the Nielsen ratings system, it was watched by 6.4 million households during its original broadcast. Tracy Morgan, who plays Tracy Jordan, submitted this episode due to his nomination for a Primetime Emmy Award in the category for Outstanding Supporting Actor in a Comedy Series. Ken Whittingham won the NAACP Image Award for Outstanding Directing in a Comedy Series for "The Funcooker".

== Plot ==
TGS head writer Liz Lemon (Tina Fey) is assigned to solve a public relations problem caused by the show's stars, Tracy Jordan (Tracy Morgan) and Jenna Maroney (Jane Krakowski), during their hosting duties of the St. Patrick's Day parade, in which Jenna passed out and Tracy cursed during the live television broadcast. To make things worse, Liz is summoned to jury duty and cannot avoid it despite claiming to be Princess Leia. When she leaves for jury duty, she does not leave anyone in charge and allows the staff to go without direction—until later when she puts NBC page Kenneth Parcell (Jack McBrayer) in charge after learning that the staff have gotten out of hand. Liz is on a court case about a woman, named Rochelle Gaulke (Jackie Hoffman), whose work life and frustrations parallel her own; the two both have employees named Tracy and Jenna, both believe their employees waste their time, and make their lives difficult.

Meanwhile, Jenna, worn out from working on TGS during the day and on her unlicensed Janis Joplin biopic at night, visits Dr. Leo Spaceman (Chris Parnell) for help so she can work on both. He gives Jenna a military-grade experimental drug currently being tested on rats to stay awake. At the same time, Tracy believes that having enough money to pay FCC fines means that he can say anything on television, and he says to Liz, "I can even say what Ernest Borgnine whispered to me." As a result, Tracy curses on The Martha Stewart Show, and after learning that the show's advertisers are pulling out, due to his actions, decides to sponsor the show. Meanwhile, Vice President of East Coast Television and Microwave Oven Programming for General Electric, Jack Donaghy, desperately tries to find a name for a pocket microwave oven that is not offensive in any language. With Liz gone, Jack assigns the TGS writing staff, Frank Rossitano (Judah Friedlander), James "Toofer" Spurlock (Keith Powell), J. D. Lutz (John Lutz), Josh Girard (Lonny Ross), and Sue LaRoche-Van der Hout (Sue Galloway), to this task. After their unsuccessful attempts, Kenneth suggests "The Funcooker" which Jack decides is the perfect name.

Back at the studios, the taping of TGS is interrupted by Dr. Spaceman who desperately forces Jenna to sleep because she might die like one of his test rats. Tracy creates a diversion by dropping his trousers and exposing his buttocks, which he refers to as the "Funcooker". Everyone realizes that this is where Kenneth heard the name. Fed up with the chaos, Liz sends the entire show's staff—including Kenneth and Dr. Spaceman—to her office. Liz ponders over a box of matches and thinks of the woman in court, in which she admitted to committing arson as a way of getting back at her out-of-control employees. She accidentally does start a small fire which is quickly put out but scares everyone out of their bad behavior.

== Production ==
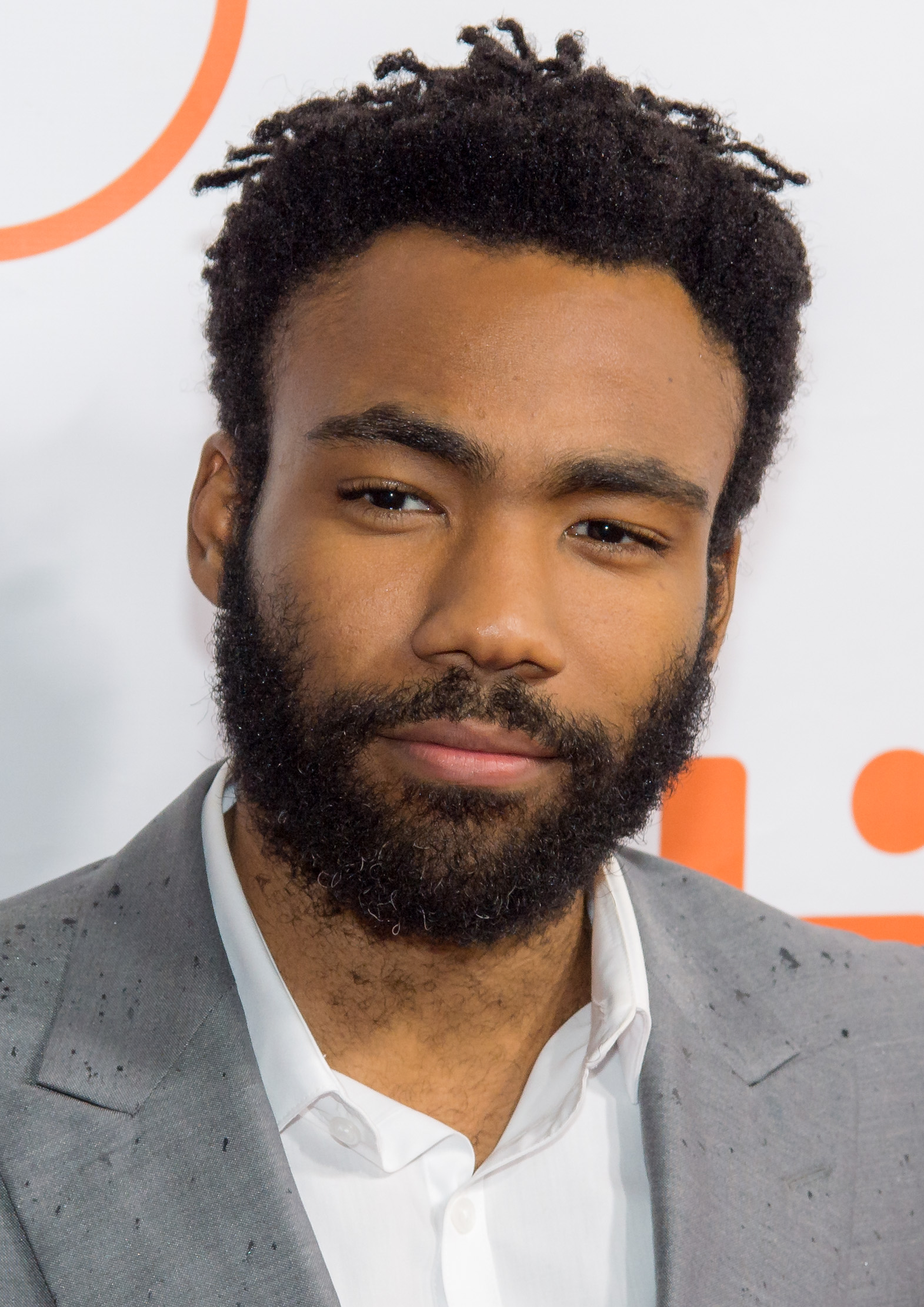
Donald Glover (pictured) wrote "The Funcooker" along with co-writer Tom Ceraulo

"The Funcooker" was written by script co-coordinator Tom Ceraulo and that season's executive story editor Donald Glover, and was directed by Ken Whittingham. This episode was Ceraulo's first writing credit, and second written episode by Glover. This was Whittingham's first 30 Rock directed episode, and would later return to helm the fourth season episode "Anna Howard Shaw Day". "The Funcooker" originally aired on NBC in the United States on March 12, 2009.

Actor Chris Parnell, who played Dr. Leo Spaceman in this episode, has appeared in the main cast of Saturday Night Live (SNL), a weekly sketch comedy series which airs on NBC in the United States. Series' creator, executive producer and lead actress Tina Fey was the head writer on SNL from 1999 until 2006. Fey and Tracy Morgan have both been part of the main cast of SNL. This was Parnell's tenth appearance as Dr. Spaceman. Actress and stand-up comedian Jackie Hoffman also guest starred, as Rochelle Gaulke, on this episode. Nancy O'Dell, then-anchor of the entertainment news program, Access Hollywood, played herself in "The Funcooker" in which she reads an apology written by NBC on Tracy Jordan's behalf. O'Dell had previously appeared in the 30 Rock episode "Señor Macho Solo".

Star Wars is frequently referenced in 30 Rock, beginning with the pilot episode in 2006 where Tracy is seen shouting that he is a Jedi. Liz Lemon admits to being a huge fan of Star Wars, saying that she had watched it many times with Pete Hornberger (Scott Adsit), and dressed up as the Star Wars character Princess Leia during four recent Halloweens, and while trying to get out of jury duty in Chicago. Star Wars is also referenced when Tracy takes on the identity of the character Chewbacca. Fey, a fan of Star Wars herself, said that the weekly Star Wars joke or reference "started happening organically" when the crew realized that they had a Star Wars reference "in almost every show". Fey said that from then on "it became a thing where [they] tried to keep it going", and that even though they could not include one in every episode, they still had a "pretty high batting average". Fey attributed most of the references to executive producer and writer Robert Carlock, whom she described as "the resident expert".

== Reception ==
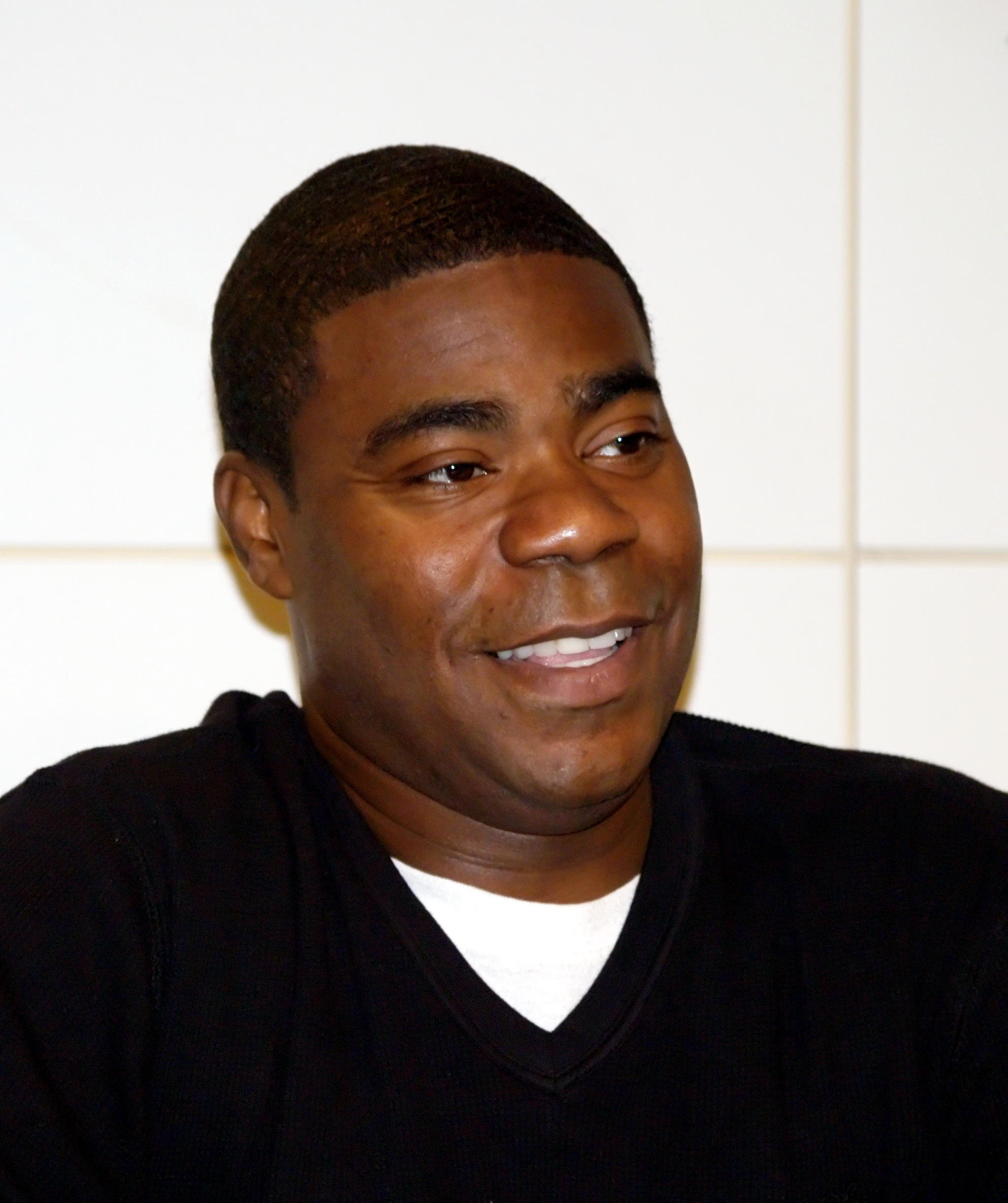
Tracy Morgan submitted this episode due to his nomination for the Primetime Emmy Award for Outstanding Supporting Actor in a Comedy Series

According to the Nielsen ratings system, "The Funcooker" was watched by 6.4 million households in its original American broadcast. It earned a 3.9 rating/6 share in the 18–49 demographic. This means that it was seen by 3.9% of all 18- to 49-year-olds, and 6% of all 18- to 49-year-olds watching television at the time of the broadcast. This was a decrease from the previous episode, "Goodbye, My Friend", which was watched by 7.3 million American viewers. "The Funcooker" was the ninth highest-rated show on the NBC network during the week of March 9–15, 2009. Tracy Morgan received a Primetime Emmy Award nomination for Outstanding Supporting Actor in a Comedy Series at the 61st Primetime Emmy Awards for his work in this episode, but lost it to actor Jon Cryer. Ken Whittingham, director of this episode, won the NAACP Image Award for Outstanding Directing in a Comedy Series at the 41st NAACP Image Awards ceremony.

The episode received generally positive reviews. IGN contributor Robert Canning praised "The Funcooker" writing that it was fantastic and "never felt like a moment was wasted or that a scene was extraneous." He enjoyed all the storylines in the episode, writing they were interesting and funny enough, and complimented the way they all tied together with such ease. Canning enjoyed Tracy's actions writing that they fit perfectly for the Tracy character, and gave the episode a 9.6 out of 10 rating. "Holy normalsauce, did I ever love this episode", wrote Entertainment Weekly's Margaret Lyons. Her only complaint about this episode was Scott Adsit's absence. Bob Sassone of AOL's TV Squad was grateful that the episode focused on NBC, TGS, and the work of the staff. Sassone wrote that despite "The Funcooker" not being "the most laugh-out-loud episode" he believed it was still funny. The A.V. Club's Nathan Rabin praised Jackie Hoffman's performance, noting that her monologue in court was brilliant. He enjoyed all of the episode's storylines, except for Tracy's, which he opined fell flat. In conclusion, Rabin gave this episode a B+ rating. Television columnist Alan Sepinwall wrote that an episode like "The Funcooker" is "really instructive about why a lot of other shows ... haven't quite worked. Even when they have lots of funny things in them, they never really build to a climax in the way that this one did, as everything went wrong at once." Sepinwall enjoyed Tina Fey's Liz in the episode, noting that her craziness worked well, but his concern was that when Liz loses it "there's nobody sane for her to push against."
