= Señor Macho Solo =

- 30 Rock episode
- Episode no.: Season 3 Episode 7
- Directed by: Beth McCarthy
- Written by: Ron Weiner
- Production code: 307
- Original air date: January 8, 2009

Guest appearances
- Billy Bush as himself; Peter Dinklage as Stewart LaGrange; Salma Hayek as Elisa; Nancy O'Dell as herself; Sherri Shepherd as Angie

Episode chronology
← Previous "Christmas Special"	Next → "Flu Shot"
- 30 Rock season 3

"Señor Macho Solo" is the seventh episode of the third season of the American television comedy series 30 Rock, and the 43rd overall episode of the series. It was written by co-executive producer Ron Weiner and directed by Beth McCarthy. The episode originally aired on NBC in the United States on January 8, 2009. Peter Dinklage, Salma Hayek, and Sherri Shepherd guest star in "Señor Macho Solo", and there are cameo appearances by Billy Bush and Nancy O'Dell.

In the episode, Liz Lemon (Tina Fey) becomes attracted to a new man, Stewart LaGrange (Dinklage). Meanwhile, Jack Donaghy (Alec Baldwin) tries to help Tracy Jordan (Tracy Morgan) and his wife, Angie (Shepherd), arrange a post-nuptial agreement and Jenna Maroney (Jane Krakowski) auditions for a Janis Joplin biographical film. At the same time, Jack finds a new love in the form of Elisa (Hayek), his mother's nurse.

"Señor Macho Solo" has received generally positive reception from television critics. According to the Nielsen Media Research, the episode was watched by 5.4 million households during its original broadcast, and received a 2.3 rating/5 share among viewers in the 18–49 demographic.

== Plot ==
Liz Lemon (Tina Fey) desires to have a baby, but her adoption process is taking a long time. She begins to act "baby-crazy" when she is around little children. While outside of 30 Rock, Liz pats a boy in front of her on the head, only to discover that it is not a child but a dwarf man, Stewart LaGrange (Peter Dinklage). To cover up, Liz lies to Stewart, telling him that the reason she patted his head was to get his attention, which he accepts, and the two go on a date. During their date, Liz tries to pick Stewart up to stop him from touching fire. Stewart asks Liz if she first thought he was a child when they first met, and she admits this is true, displeasing him. The next day, she calls him to apologize and asks that he give her a second chance and meet her at the Brooklyn Bridge. At the bridge, however, Liz mistakenly thinks a boy is Stewart, which prompts him to realize this will never work between them.

In another storyline, Jack Donaghy (Alec Baldwin) hires a new nurse, Elisa Pedrera (Salma Hayek), to take care of his mother, Colleen (Elaine Stritch). Meanwhile, Jack helps Tracy Jordan (Tracy Morgan) manage his money because his spending has gotten out of control. Jack recommends a "post-nup" agreement for Tracy and his wife, Angie (Sherri Shepherd), as Tracy fears that Angie might leave him if she ever were to have enough money to live on. Angie agrees to sign the agreement but promises Tracy that she will never leave his side, which moves Tracy and he stops her from signing the agreement. Later, Jack feels a lump in one of his testicles, and believing he has testicular cancer, he begins to look at life differently. He admits to Liz that he has fallen in love with Elisa after they spent some time together. When he gets his test results, which come back negative, he has second thoughts about Elisa. In the end, however, Jack comes home to Elisa, and the two share a kiss.

Finally, Jenna Maroney (Jane Krakowski) learns that Sheinhardt Universal—the fictional owner of General Electric—is producing a biographical film on singer Janis Joplin, and she decides to audition for it. As a way to get the role, she goes into Jack's office in character. The plan works after Jack is easily convinced. Much to her dismay, Jenna learns that actress Julia Roberts and director Martin Scorsese are also making a Janis Joplin movie and that Sheinhardt Universal has yet to secure the song and image rights of Joplin. In order for the company to avoid legal problems, Jenna is introduced as "Janet Jopler" on TGS—the show she stars in—and sings the song "Piece of My Heart" but with reworded lyrics.

== Production ==
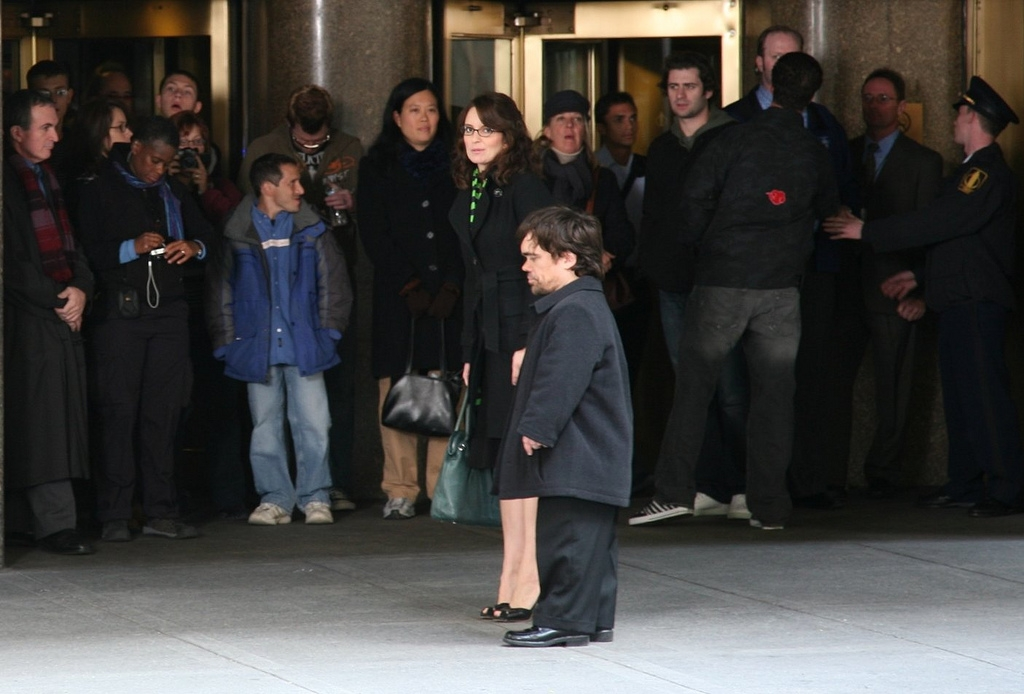
Tina Fey and Peter Dinklage filming scenes of this episode outside of Rockefeller Center.

"Señor Macho Solo" was written by co-executive producer Ron Weiner and directed by Beth McCarthy. This episode was Weiner's second writing credit, having written season two episode "Secrets and Lies", and was McCarthy's fifth directed episode. It originally aired in the United States on January 8, 2009, on NBC as the seventh episode of the show's third season and the 43rd overall episode of the series.

Actress Salma Hayek made her 30 Rock debut as the character Elisa Pedrera, a nurse for Jack Donaghy's mother and love interest for him in this episode. She next guest starred in the episodes "Flu Shot", "Generalissimo", "St. Valentine's Day", and "Larry King". Hayek made her final appearance on the show in the April 23, 2009, episode "The Ones".

Comedian actress Sherri Shepherd made her fourth appearance on the series as Angie Jordan, the wife of Tracy Jordan, played by Tracy Morgan. Shepherd appeared in the episodes "Up All Night", "Jack Gets in the Game", and "The Collection". Actor Peter Dinklage played Stewart LaGrange in the episode. Nancy O'Dell and Billy Bush, hosts of the entertainment news program Access Hollywood appeared as themselves in "Señor Macho Solo", as they report on the entertainment program that actress Julia Roberts and director Martin Scorsese are also developing a Janis Joplin feature. O'Dell played herself in the March 12, 2009, episode "The Funcooker". Tina Fey and Dinklage shot one of their first scenes from the episode on October 6, 2008.

== Cultural references ==
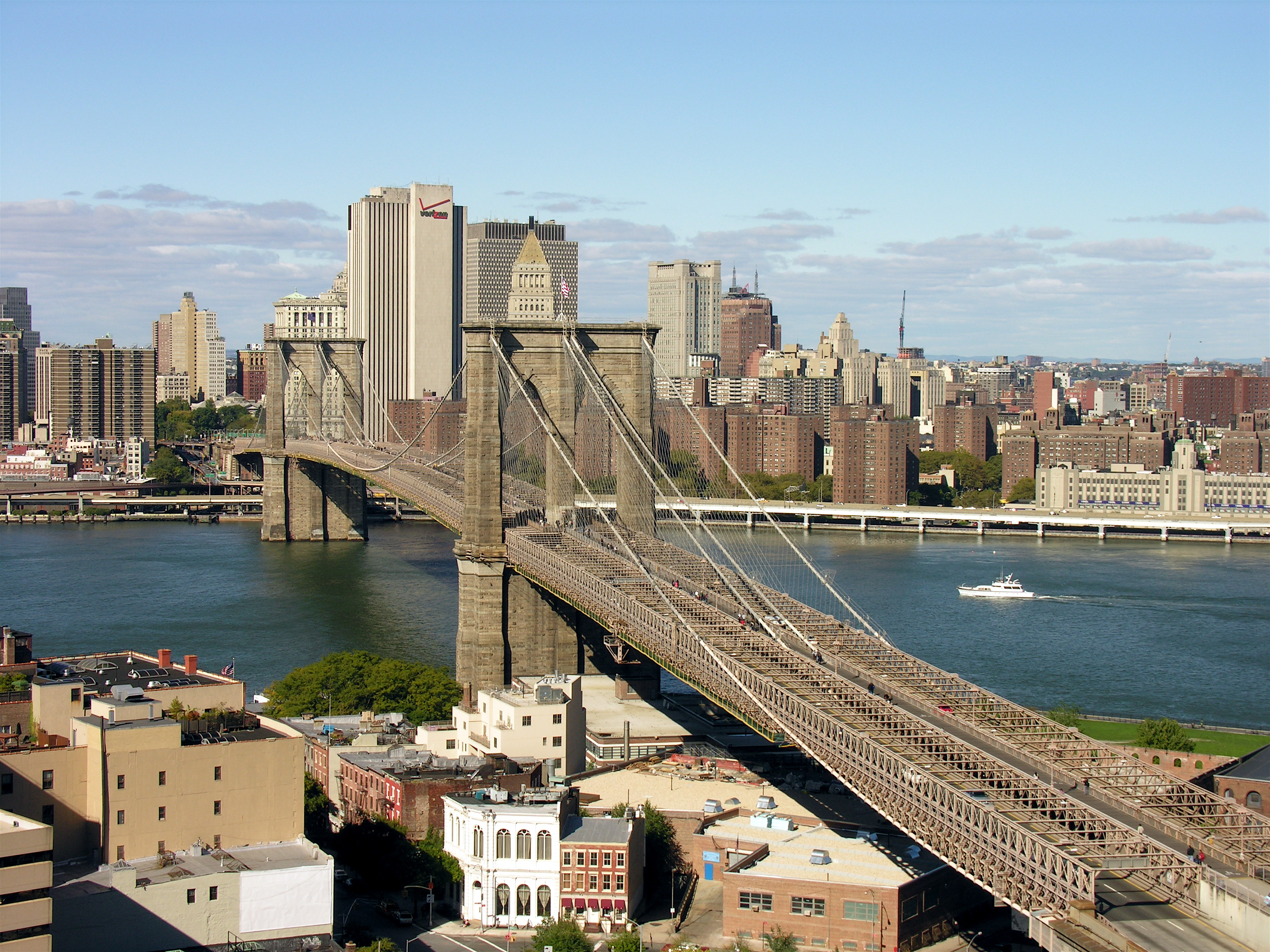
Liz tells Stewart that if they are meant to be with one another, they should meet at the Brooklyn Bridge (pictured), like Miranda Hobbes and Steve Brady did in the Sex in the City movie.

Signs of Tracy's money spending problems included his purchase of three hours of prime-time as a salute to Benny Hill. When Elisa informs Jack that he has a lump on one of his testicles, Jack responds, "Thank you for telling me what I already know. You should work for the Huffington Post", the latter being a liberal news and aggregated blog website that Alec Baldwin has been a contributor to since 2005. Elisa tells Jack that "Señor Macho Solo" is "what we call a McRib sandwich", a sandwich sold at McDonald's. NBC page Kenneth Parcell (Jack McBrayer) does the "Top That" rap from the fantasy-comedy film Teen Witch (1989). Jenna sings the song "Piece of My Heart", from Janis Joplin, though, the lyrics had been reworded by Jack so that Sheinhardt Universal avoid legal problems. In addition, Jenna sings the song and carries a bottle of Jack Daniel's in hand, a real life trait of the late singer.

Star Wars is frequently referenced in 30 Rock, beginning with the pilot episode in 2006 where Tracy is seen shouting that he is a Jedi. Liz admits to being a huge fan of Star Wars, saying that she had watched it many times with Pete Hornberger (Scott Adsit), and dressed up as the Star Wars character Princess Leia during four recent Halloweens, and while trying to get out of jury duty in Chicago. Star Wars is also referenced when Tracy takes on the identity of the character Chewbacca. In this episode, Liz tells Stewart that there are many languages and costumes in the conference room of the United Nations, saying, "it must be like working in the Galactic Senate in Star Wars". Stewart responds, "They are similar. We're also concerned about the growing influence of the Sith Lord."

== Reception ==
According to the Nielsen Media Research, "Señor Macho Solo" was watched by 5.4 million households in its original American broadcast. It earned a 2.3 rating/5 share in the 18–49 demographic. This means that it was seen by 2.3 percent of all 18- to 49-year-olds, and 5 percent of all 18- to 49-year-olds watching television at the time of the broadcast. This was a decrease from the previous episode, "Christmas Special", which was watched by 8.9 million American viewers. Since airing, the episode has received generally positive reviews.

IGN contributor Robert Canning praised 30 Rock for putting it all together "so seamlessly" and "so brilliantly balanced" in "Señor Macho Solo". Canning enjoyed Tracy's story, observing that it was a "fantastic Tracy Jordan moment." He complimented Sherri Shepherd's guest spot, writing that it was a great way to bring her back "into the mix". He also liked that this episode "delivered some great work" from Alec Baldwin. In conclusion, Canning gave the episode a 9.3 out of 10 rating. Television columnist Alan Sepinwall for The Star-Ledger appreciated Jenna's subplot as it was "the first really work-centric one in a while." He complimented Peter Dinklage's appearance, but was less enthusiastic about Salma Hayek being a love interest for Baldwin's Jack, citing that he did not buy her in the Elisa role. Kona Gallagher of AOL's TV Squad said that Dinklage, Hayek, and Shepherd "fit into the episode, instead of feeling like the episode was written around them." Gallagher noted that Dinklage was "pretty awesome" as Tina Fey's love interest, "and I would have loved to see more of them together. I really think they could have done more with this storyline." According to Gallagher, the only part of "Señor Macho Solo" that she was not "crazy about" was Jenna playing Janis Joplin.

TV Guide's Matt Mitovich observed that "Señor Macho Solo" was the "best episode of the season" as it "kept all of the comedy rooted in the actual storylines". He wrote that the Tracy story was "packed [with] plenty of amusement", and that the character's spending problem was "funny for the sight gags alone". Mitovich commented that Hayek's character was "one of Jack's best matches yet". Jeremy Median of Paste opined that "Señor Macho Solo" featured one of the "funniest sight gags in 30 Rock history", referring to Tracy wearing a coat made out of money, shoes made of gold, and "a Mad Hatter-like hat made out of money, as only Tracy could pull off." He also wrote that it was nice to be reminded of Liz's "baby-cravings, a story that's been bubbling on the surface for a while now but reemerged here." Nathan Rabin for The A.V. Club noted that this episode "juggled its various lovestruck plots with aplomb", and gave this episode an A−. Rabin liked all the plots, but most enjoyed Jenna's story of her trying to play Janis Joplin.
