= Cutbacks (30 Rock) =

- 30 Rock episode
- Episode no.: Season 3 Episode 17
- Directed by: Gail Mancuso
- Written by: Matt Hubbard
- Production code: 317
- Original air date: April 9, 2009

Guest appearances
- Roger Bart as Brad Halster; Todd Buonopane as Jeffrey Weinerslav; Don Pardo as Sid, the TGS announcer

Episode chronology
← Previous "Apollo, Apollo"	Next → "Jackie Jormp-Jomp"
- 30 Rock season 3

"Cutbacks" is the 17th episode of the third season of the American television comedy series 30 Rock, and the 53rd episode of the series overall. It was written by supervising producer Matt Hubbard and directed by Gail Mancuso. The episode originally aired on NBC in the United States on April 9, 2009. Guest stars in this episode include Roger Bart, Todd Buonopane, and Don Pardo.

In the episode, joy about the fiftieth episode for the fictitious show The Girlie Show with Tracy Jordan (TGS) turns to worry when word spreads about imminent budget cuts at the 30 Rock workplace. Before long, Jack Donaghy (Alec Baldwin) must fire several employees to save money, NBC page Kenneth Parcell (Jack McBrayer) takes on new responsibilities, and Liz Lemon (Tina Fey) wheels and deals to spare her staffers from layoffs. Meanwhile, Jenna Maroney (Jane Krakowski) and Tracy Jordan (Tracy Morgan) suspect that Kenneth is masking a deep dark secret. This episode of 30 Rock featured a number of cultural references to the legal crime thriller film The Pelican Brief (1993), and Liz Lemon parodying Steve Jobs's attire while giving a presentation.

"Cutbacks" has received generally positive reception from television critics. According to the Nielsen ratings system, the episode was watched by 6.8 million households during its original broadcast, and received a 3.1 rating/8 share among viewers in the 18–49 demographic.

== Plot ==
The TGS with Tracy Jordan crew have finished taping their fiftieth episode and decide to celebrate. Their boss, Vice President of East Coast Television and Microwave Oven Programming for General Electric, Jack Donaghy (Alec Baldwin), goes to the writers' room and tells the show's head writer, Liz Lemon (Tina Fey), about how the whole company is undergoing cutbacks. After an unsuccessful presentation about TGS, Brad Halster (Roger Bart)—one of the consultants in charge of the cutbacks—informs Liz that she needs to cut her annual budget by 25 percent. Liz, anxious about her employees losing their jobs, decides to use sexual bartering to solve the problem and asks Brad on a date, which he accepts. Liz dresses in the trashiest outfit she can find, and goes on her date. The next day, she discovers that cutbacks are still taking place at TGS, and confronts Brad. Realizing that he was being used, Brad charges Liz with sexual harassment and she is suspended from work for two weeks. Jack tells Liz that the budget review process will start over again, this time under his supervision.

Meanwhile, NBC page Kenneth Parcell (Jack McBrayer) becomes Jack's office assistant, replacing his former assistant Jonathan (Maulik Pancholy). Kenneth asks Tracy Jordan (Tracy Morgan) to feed his bird, as he is busy with two jobs now. Kenneth asks Tracy not to enter his bedroom, a request that makes Tracy curious. Believing Kenneth might be a serial killer, he tells Jenna Maroney (Jane Krakowski) and they decide to investigate Kenneth's bedroom. At Kenneth's apartment, they discover a bug bomb in his room, and reaching the conclusion that Kenneth is trying to poison them and they run out of his apartment. They forget to close the door and the bug bomb ends up killing the bird. When they tell Kenneth about his bird, he is more upset by the fact that Tracy and Jenna did not trust him, than the death of his bird. Tracy and Jenna, feeling horrible about what they have done, arrange a surprise for Kenneth at his apartment. When Kenneth goes home, he finds an entire collection of birds.

== Production ==
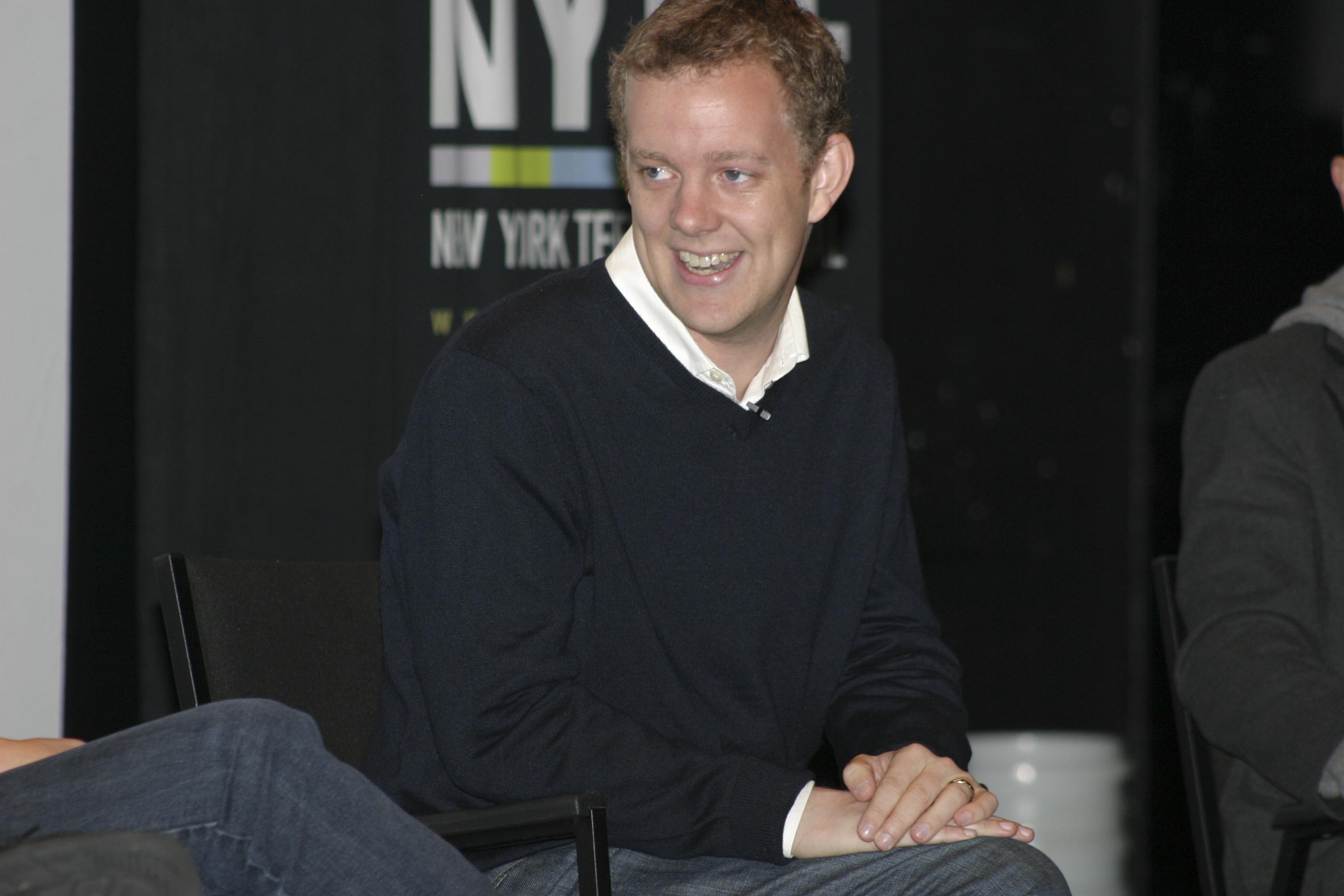
"Cutbacks" was written by supervising producer Matt Hubbard (pictured).

"Cutbacks" was written by series supervising producer Matt Hubbard, making it his seventh writing credit after "The Rural Juror", "Hard Ball", "The Collection", "MILF Island", "Reunion", and "Larry King". The episode was directed by Gail Mancuso, making it her sixth for the series. "Cutbacks" originally aired in the United States on April 9, 2009, on NBC as the seventeenth episode of the show's third season and the 53rd overall episode of the series.

This episode of 30 Rock featured a guest appearance from actor Roger Bart, who played a man from a consulting firm in charge of the cutbacks in the 30 Rock workplace. Television announcer Don Pardo guest starred as Sid, the TGS announcer. Pardo was the announcer on the sketch comedy show Saturday Night Live (SNL), a weekly sketch comedy series which airs on NBC in the United States. Series creator, executive producer and lead actress Tina Fey was the head writer on SNL from 1999 until 2006. Fey and Tracy Morgan have both been part of the main cast of SNL. This was actor Todd Buonopane's second appearance as the character Jeffrey Weinerslav, an NBC Human Resource mediator. In this episode, Jeffrey informs Liz that a sexual harassment lawsuit has been filed against her for sexual bartering. Buonopane appeared in "Believe in the Stars" and later in "Jackie Jormp-Jomp".

One filmed scene from "Cutbacks" was cut out from the airing. The scene was included on 30 Rock’s season three DVD as part of the deleted scenes bonus feature. In the scene, Kenneth is instructed by Jack to only interrupt his firing meetings if something important comes up. Kenneth believes that getting Showtime for three months from Time Warner Cable is something he should bring up to Jack, but Jack informs him that getting Showtime does not qualify as something important.

== Cultural references ==
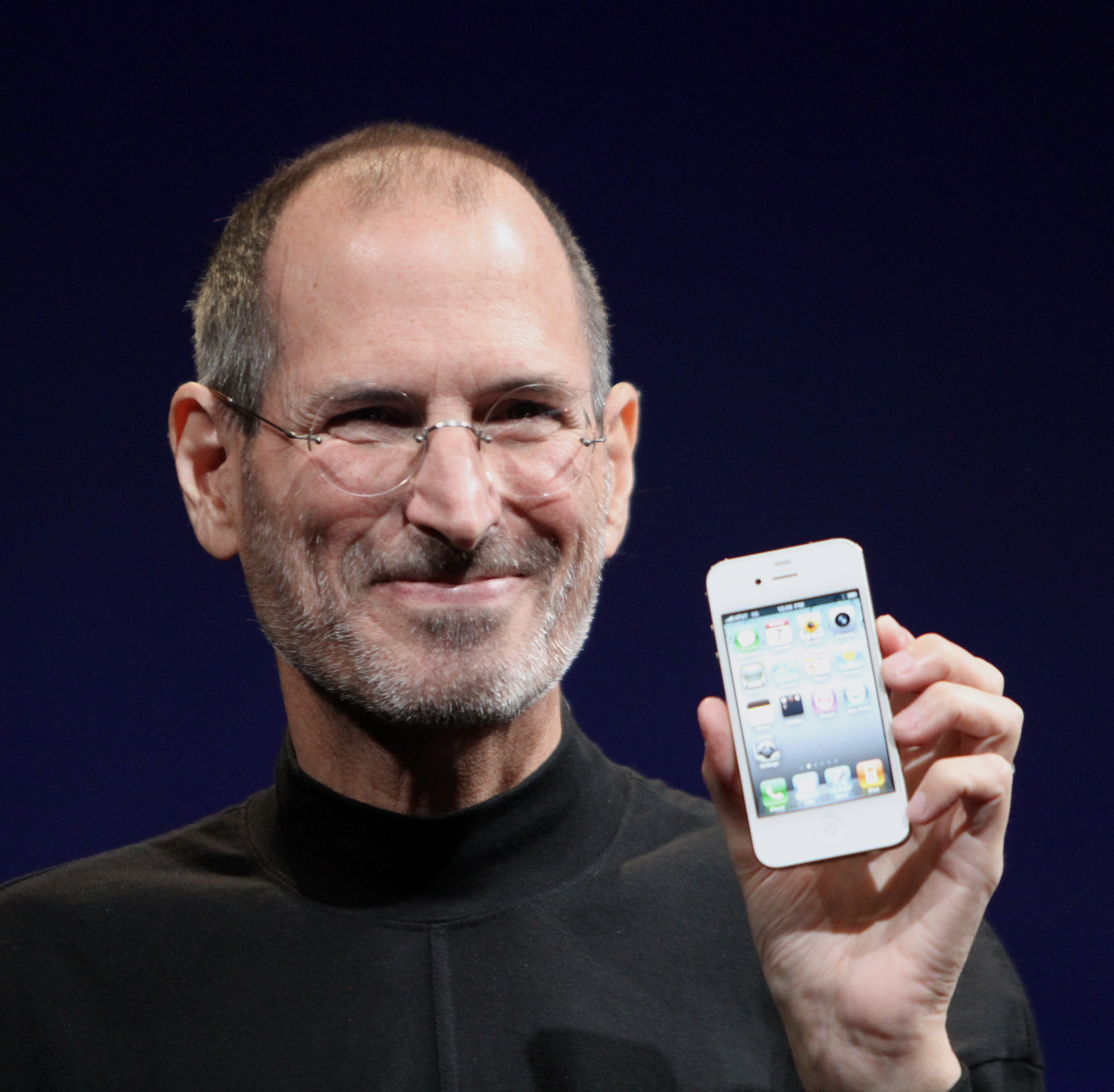
In this episode, Liz parodies business magnate Steve Jobs's (pictured) attire while giving her presentation about TGS.

Throughout the episode, references are made to the 1993 legal crime thriller film The Pelican Brief. Kenneth tells Jack "I feel like I'm in The Pelican Brief. Do I already know too much?" after Jack explains to Kenneth what to do as his assistant. Later, Jack tells Liz to make her budget cuts, with Liz replying "What? That's it? I thought you'd tell me to cook the numbers or shred something or do some Pelican Brief stuff." Finally, Tracy and Jenna decide to investigate Kenneth's apartment, which leads them to compare themselves to actors Denzel Washington and Julia Roberts, the two leads from the movie.

In one scene of "Cutbacks", Liz parodies business magnate Steve Jobs's clothing attire while giving her presentation about TGS to Brad. Later, Tracy goes to Jenna with his suspicions that Kenneth might be a murderer. Jenna tells Tracy that she has knowledge when it comes to serial killers after playing a criminal profiler—named Jill St. Ferrari—in an original Lifetime miniseries Hushed Rapings. When Tracy and Jenna go to Kenneth's apartment, they go to his bedroom and see a bug bomb in his room, which prompts Tracy to say "Oh no, Kenneth's a killer, and the Riddler is coming!", the latter is a reference to the comic book villain who leaves behind riddles, puzzles, and word games so that they can be solved.

Star Wars is frequently referenced in 30 Rock, beginning with the pilot episode in 2006 where Tracy is seen shouting that he is a Jedi. Liz admits to being a huge fan of Star Wars, saying that she had watched it many times with Pete Hornberger (Scott Adsit), and dressed up as the Star Wars character Princess Leia during four recent Halloweens, and while trying to get out of jury duty in Chicago and New York. Star Wars is also referenced when Tracy takes on the identity of the character Chewbacca. In this episode, the TGS crew tells Liz "Do something Liz, you're our only hope", in regards to the cutbacks. This line was said by Princess Leia in the Star Wars movies, in which she was played by actress Carrie Fisher, who guest-starred in the season two episode "Rosemary's Baby". Tina Fey, a fan of Star Wars herself, said that the weekly Star Wars joke or reference "started happening organically" when the crew realized that they had a Star Wars reference "in almost every show". Fey said that from then on "it became a thing where [they] tried to keep it going", and that even though they could not include one in every episode, they still had a "pretty high batting average". Fey attributed most of the references to executive producer and writer Robert Carlock, whom she described as "the resident expert". At the end of the episode, when Kenneth enters his apartment and sees all the birds given to him by Jenna and Tracy, he declares he has some naming to do. The last two birds he names "Lorne" and "Michael", a reference to the executive producer of Saturday Night Live, Lorne Michaels, who is credited on the screen during the line.

== Reception ==
In its original American broadcast, "Cutbacks" was watched by 6.8 million households, according to the Nielsen ratings system. It received a 3.1 rating/8 share among viewers in the 18–49 demographic, meaning that 3.1 percent of all people in that group, and 8 percent of all people from that group watching television at the time, watched the episode. This was a decrease from the previous episode, "Apollo, Apollo", which was watched by 7.2 million American viewers.

IGN contributor Robert Canning opined that "Cutbacks" was "solid", as it "included all the major players in familiar roles and provided some great laughs." Canning complimented Roger Bart's performance noting that he played the part "very straight until the very end." In regards to the Tracy, Jenna, and Kenneth plot, he said that the overall ending was "a bit weak" but "the majority of the story worked well." In conclusion, Canning gave the episode an 8.3 out of 10 rating. Leonard Pierce of The A.V. Club noted that this episode was "broad as hell, with three incredibly whoopsie plot threads all driven by one of the most venerable office sitcom tropes (budget cuts), but it was redeemed not only by being funny as hell at its best, but by letting the unlikability of some of the main characters – sometimes inadvertent, sometimes not, provide some of the strongest laughs in 'Cutbacks'." Entertainment Weekly’s Margaret Lyons said that despite this episode not being "one of the show's most sophisticated [ones]" she still enjoyed it, citing that it had "some pretty fantastic lines – and some really cute moments between Liz and Jack."

Bob Sassone of AOL's TV Squad said that "Cutbacks" was a "funny episode", but stated that he disliked Liz's actions, explaining that what she did was "creepy." Sassone did not enjoy Tracy and Jenna believing that Kenneth was a murder "because of a wacky series of misunderstandings and assumptions" observing that this scenario has been played out "in every other sitcom since 1989." Television columnist Alan Sepinwall for The Star-Ledger reported that he was "very unsatisfied" with this episode, though, noted that he preferred Liz's plot over Tracy, Jenna, and Kenneth's. Overall, Sepinwall said that the episode was "meh".
