= Generalissimo (30 Rock) =

- 30 Rock episode
- Episode no.: Season 3 Episode 10
- Directed by: Todd Holland
- Written by: Robert Carlock
- Production code: 310
- Original air date: February 5, 2009

Guest appearances
- Jon Hamm as Dr. Drew Baird; Salma Hayek as Elisa; Patrick Heusinger as intern number one; Matt Lauer as himself; Doug Mand as intern number three; Greg Tuculescu as intern number two; Teresa Yenque as Elisa's grandmother

Episode chronology
← Previous "Retreat to Move Forward"	Next → "St. Valentine's Day"
- 30 Rock season 3

"Generalissimo" is the tenth episode of the third season of the American television comedy series 30 Rock. It was written by executive producer Robert Carlock and directed by Todd Holland. The episode originally aired on NBC in the United States on February 5, 2009. Guest stars in "Generalissimo" include Jon Hamm, Salma Hayek, Patrick Heusinger, Matt Lauer, Doug Mand, Greg Tuculescu, and Teresa Yenque.

In the episode, Liz Lemon (Tina Fey) begins receiving mail intended for her new neighbor, Dr. Drew Baird (Hamm), and after going through it she decides she would like to meet him. Meanwhile, Jack Donaghy (Alec Baldwin) resembles a Spanish-language soap opera villain, "The Generalissimo", which prompts the grandmother (Yenque) of Jack's girlfriend, Elisa (Hayek), to disapprove of their relationship. Back at 30 Rock, the new The Girlie Show with Tracy Jordan (TGS) interns (Heusinger, Tuculescu, and Mand) invite Tracy Jordan (Tracy Morgan) out for a night of partying.

"Generalissimo" received generally positive reviews. According to the Nielsen ratings system, it was watched by 6.4 million households during its original broadcast. Todd Holland received a Primetime Emmy Award nomination for Outstanding Directing for a Comedy Series for "Generalissimo". This episode was submitted for consideration on the behalf of Baldwin for Outstanding Lead Actor in a Comedy Series.

== Plot ==
Liz Lemon (Tina Fey) receives the mail of her new neighbor, Dr. Drew Baird (Jon Hamm). After going through it, she believes he is the perfect man for her. To try and woo him, she follows the actions of an evil Spanish soap character called "The Generalissimo" from Los Amantes Clandestinos, despite the warnings of Jenna Maroney (Jane Krakowski) and Elisa (Salma Hayek). She invites Drew to a nonexistent party, and, when he arrives expecting a party, she informs him that the party is scheduled for the following evening, but nevertheless invites him in. While this plan initially appears to work, things go wrong when Liz accidentally gives Drew Rohypnol (which Tracy took like aspirin so he can keep up with some hard-partying interns who used to be finance bros) and he finds some of his opened mail in her handbag and accuses Liz of being a stalker trying to trap Drew into having sex with him. The next day, Drew receives some of Liz's mail and reads it. He says that based on her mail, he probably would have wanted to meet Liz, in the same vein as she had wanted to meet him. They decide to start with a clean slate and go on a real date.

Jack Donaghy (Alec Baldwin) meets his girlfriend Elisa's grandmother (Teresa Yenque). The grandmother does not like Jack because he reminds her of the Generalissimo, the antagonist from her favorite Mexican telenovela Los Amantes Clandestinos. Jack buys Los Amantes Clandestinos and tries to kill the Generalissimo off, but the actors on the show refuse to cooperate. Jack then meets Hector Moreda (also played by Baldwin), the actor who plays the Generalissimo, and asks why he will not follow the script. According to Hector, his role as the Generalissimo allows him to cut in line at Disney World, among other perks. Jack shows him a picture of Elisa, explaining that he wants to kill off the character for her. Understanding Jack's feelings, Hector agrees to help Jack by making the character fall in love with an elderly Hispanic woman, thereby winning the affection of Elisa's grandmother. The grandmother subsequently accepts Jack as Elisa's boyfriend but makes one more request of him: to make NBC News less depressing. Jack responds by airing a montage of pictures of Puerto Rican babies to the music of Tito Puente on The Today Show, much to the displeasure of Matt Lauer.

Meanwhile, NBC has hired recently laid off investment bankers (Patrick Heusinger, Greg Tuculescu, and Doug Mand) from Lehman Brothers as interns on TGS with Tracy Jordan. Tracy Jordan (Tracy Morgan) is invited to go out on the town with them but finds that he is incapable of keeping up with their lifestyle. Tracy fears that his image would be severely compromised and will be reduced to being cast in dramatic roles, as that's the fate of comic actors who can no longer live fast and recklessly. Tracy buys out Lehman Brothers and sends the interns back to their old jobs on Wall Street.

== Production ==
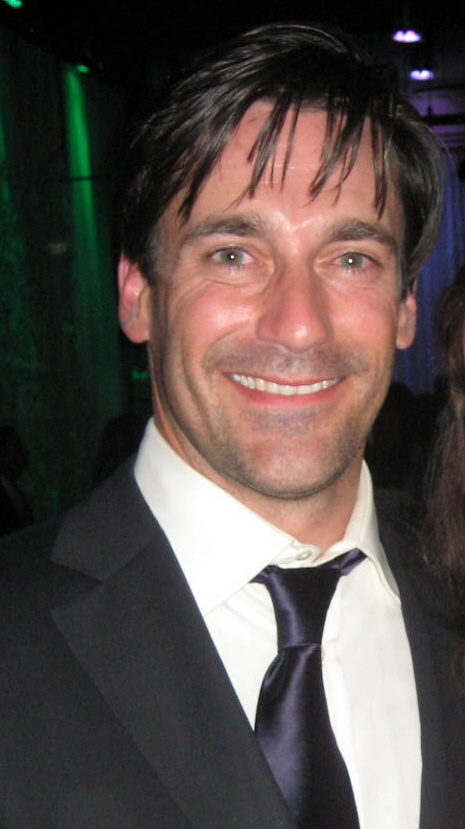
Jon Hamm made his 30 Rock debut in "Generalissimo".

"Generalissimo" was written by executive producer Robert Carlock and directed by Todd Holland. This was the tenth episode written by Carlock and was Holland's first directed episode. Holland was hired to direct this episode on the recommendation of his agent, who also represents series creator, executive producer and lead actress Tina Fey. "Generalissimo" originally aired in the United States on February 5, 2009, on NBC.

In October 2008, when actor Jon Hamm hosted the sketch comedy show Saturday Night Live (SNL), negotiations took place with the show's producers for him to guest star on 30 Rock. Two months later, it was confirmed Hamm would appear as a love interest for Fey's character, Liz Lemon. It was also announced by NBC that Hamm would star in a three-episode arc; he made his debut in this episode, made his second appearance in "St. Valentine's Day", and made his final guest spot in the show's third-season episode "The Bubble". Hamm later appeared in the season four episodes "Anna Howard Shaw Day" and "Emanuelle Goes to Dinosaur Land" and the season five episode "Live Show."

In an interview with Entertainment Weekly, Fey said when the writing staff is developing a script, "We'll have an actor in mind and we'll keep referring to them. Like for this we said, 'Then Hamm comes in, blah blah blah.'" She believed that there was no possibility of getting Hamm, though "we were lucky with the timing because Mad Men was on hiatus and he was hosting SNL. So I called over there and asked them [whispering], 'Hey, is that guy funny? Tell me the truth.' And they were like, 'Yes, he's really funny.' By Saturday I knew they were right."

This episode was actress Salma Hayek's third appearance on 30 Rock. She first appeared in the episode "Señor Macho Solo" as a nurse for Jack Donaghy's mother and love interest for Jack. Hayek's second appearance came in "Flu Shot".

== Critical reception ==
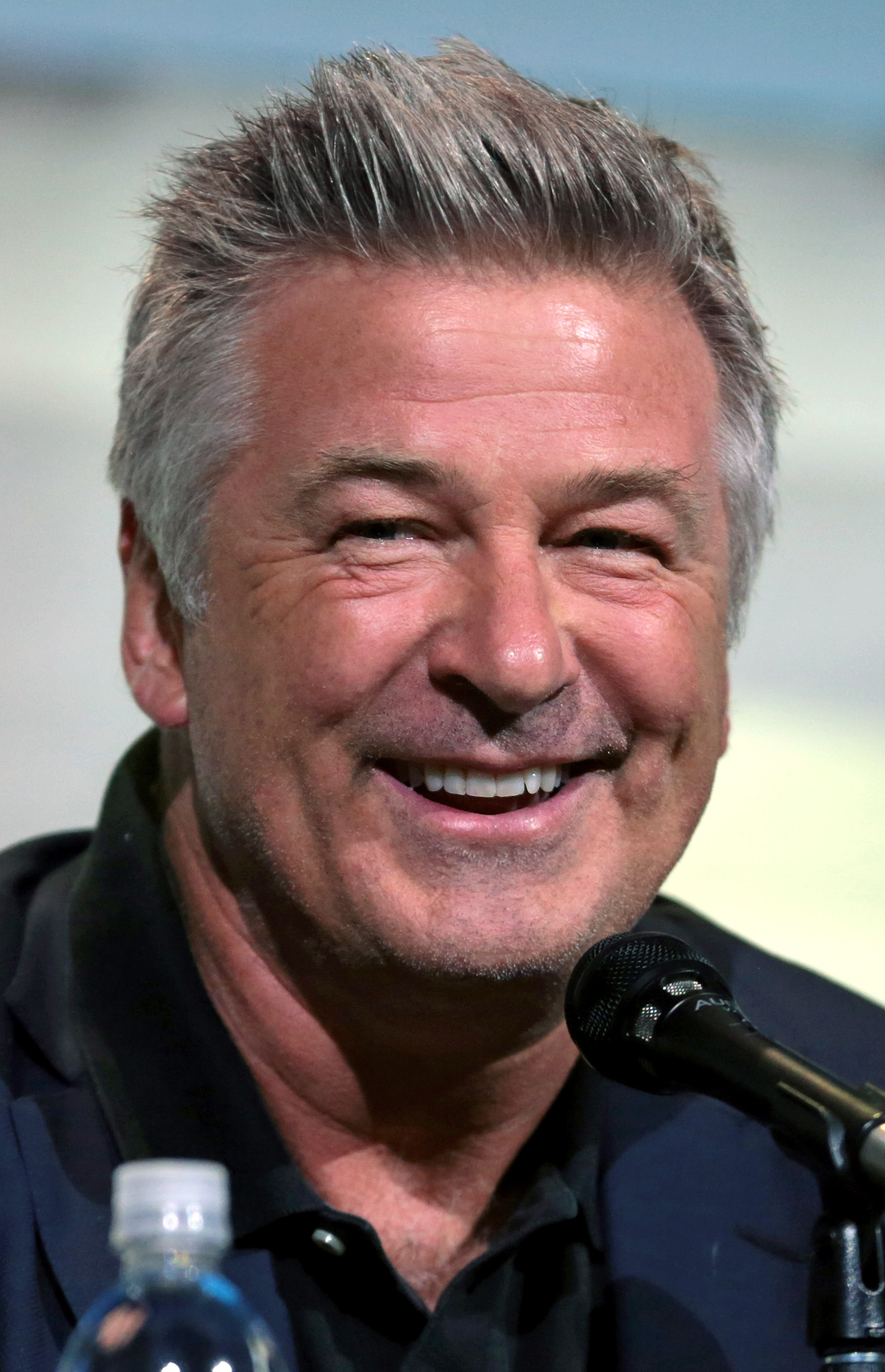
Alec Baldwin won the Emmy for Outstanding Lead Actor in a Comedy Series for his work in this episode.

According to the Nielsen ratings system, "Generalissimo" was watched by 6.4 million households, the same as the previous week's episode "Retreat to Move Forward", in its original American broadcast. It earned a 3.1 rating/7 share in the 18–49 demographic. This means that it was seen by 3.1% of all 18- to 49-year-olds, and 7% of all 18- to 49-year-olds watching television at the time of the broadcast. The episode was the eleventh highest-rated show on the NBC network that week. Todd Holland, director of this episode, received a Primetime Emmy Award nomination for Outstanding Directing For a Comedy Series at the 61st Primetime Emmy Awards. This episode was submitted for consideration on the behalf of Alec Baldwin for Outstanding Lead Actor in a Comedy Series at the same awards show.

Bob Sassone of TV Squad admitted in his review that after seeing the promos for "Generalissimo" audibly groaned, and believed the story about a fictitious soap character resembling Baldwin's Jack would not work. He wrote that all of the "over-the-top surreal subplots" featured in the season would make this episode "the worst one of all." After watching the episode, however, Sassone said all the elements worked. Annie Barrett for Entertainment Weekly reported that the two stories, involving Liz and Drew and Jack and Elisa, respectively, were sublime. Barrett said that Baldwin's performance "alone" would have made the episode great. Jeremy Medina of Paste praised this episode, along with "St. Valentine's Day", concluding, "There's no possible way to mention every funny joke or one-liner in the past two episodes. The show is just too lightning-quick for that." Writing for The Monterey County Herald Marc Cabrera noted Jack's interactions with Elisa's grandmother amongst his favorite moments of season 3. The Guardian's Will Dean wrote that "Generalissimo" was the "best episode" of the series. Staci Gold of North by Northwestern wrote that this episode was majorly improved by Baldwin's "hilarious imitation of a Spanish accent." IGN writer Robert Canning said that Baldwin stole the show in this episode, and rated it a 9.4 out of 10.

Time contributor James Poniewozik was complimentary towards the casting of Jon Hamm as Tina Fey's love interest, but hoped that Hamm get "fleshed out beyond the central-casting dreamboat" in the series. Further in his review, Poniewozik said that he most enjoyed episodes in which Liz shows her "evil side" because the show "does an excellent job of showing how much work it is for her to be assertive and slightly evil, how she's excited yet made nervous by the idea at the same time." As with Poniewozik, Nathan Rabin of The A.V. Club complimented 30 Rock as they "pulled it off with aplomb" in regards to Liz's actions in this episode. He said that Liz and Drew "are so damned delightful that it's hard not to root for them even if Liz's antics increasingly border on deranged and criminal." Rabin said that the Rohypnol incident was funny "but also sweet and more than a little romantic." Sassone enjoyed Liz and Drew's scenes, writing that when Fey and Hamm work together they are quite good. Gold said that Liz's unsuccessful attempts of seduction were "hilarious effects". Canning wrote that Liz's "scam" started weakly but that her storyline "grew at a great pace."

Not all reviews were positive. Television columnist Alan Sepinwall of The Star-Ledger said that past 30 Rock episodes took "old sitcom cliches" and were able to find a "demented" new take on them. In his review, Sepinwall wrote that "Generalissimo" felt like the staff "came up with the cliches they wanted to mock – goofy/evil twins, a character spinning a ridiculous web of lies to land a new crush – and never moved to the next step."
