= Flu Shot (30 Rock) =

- 30 Rock episode
- Episode no.: Season 3 Episode 8
- Directed by: Don Scardino
- Written by: Jon Pollack
- Production code: 308
- Original air date: January 15, 2009

Guest appearances
- George Bartenieff as Mr. Templeton; Scott Bryce as Michael Templeton; Salma Hayek as Elisa; Chris Parnell as Dr. Leo Spaceman

Episode chronology
← Previous "Señor Macho Solo"	Next → "Retreat to Move Forward"
- 30 Rock season 3

"Flu Shot" is the eighth episode of the third season of the American television comedy series 30 Rock. It was written by Jon Pollack, and directed by series producer Don Scardino. The episode originally aired on NBC in the United States on January 15, 2009. Guest stars in this episode include George Bartenieff, Scott Bryce, Salma Hayek, and Chris Parnell.

In the episode, Liz Lemon (Tina Fey) campaigns for her staff's right to get flu shots from Dr. Leo Spaceman (Parnell), but Jack Donaghy (Alec Baldwin) will not allow it due to a limited supply. Meanwhile, Jack tries to think of creative ways to spend time with his girlfriend, Elisa (Hayek), as she works seven days a week. At the same time, Jenna Maroney (Jane Krakowski) and Tracy Jordan (Tracy Morgan) try to do something nice for the crew.

"Flu Shot" received a mixed response from television critics, with Robert Canning of IGN concluding that the episode fell below 30 Rock standards. According to the Nielsen ratings system, it was watched by 6.6 million households during its original broadcast, and received a 3.2 rating/8 share among viewers in the 18–49 demographic.

== Plot ==
Liz Lemon (Tina Fey) is excited about her vacation week, until she gets a text message from her assistant, Cerie Xerox (Katrina Bowden), that the hotel she had planned to stay at was overbooked. Liz goes to see Dr. Leo Spaceman (Chris Parnell) who is giving out flu shots at the 30 Rock studios. She learns that the shots are given to select few employees. Her boss, Jack Donaghy (Alec Baldwin), asks her to let him know about the most important individuals in her staff that should receive flu shots. Liz does not agree with Jack that he should ration out health care, which results in Liz not getting a shot. Jack considers giving the show's page, Kenneth Parcell (Jack McBrayer), one of the remaining shots, as he is very ill with the flu, though Kenneth refuses. Later, Jack continuously asks Liz, who still refuses. This time, she displays her solidarity in front of The Girlie Show with Tracy Jordan (TGS) crew who show her their appreciation. However, as she sees the crew getting sicker, as days go by, she panics and gets the shot.

Meanwhile, Jack wants to spend time with his girlfriend, Elisa (Salma Hayek), but her job as a nurse does not allow it. While taking care of an elderly man named Mr. Templeton (George Bartenieff), who has dementia, Jack persuades her to spend time with him, to which Elisa gives in to, and results in the two bringing Mr. Templeton along on their dates. One day, as they prepare to go out again, Jack and Elisa are shocked when Mr. Templeton's son, Michael (Scott Bryce), visits unexpectedly. The elderly man tells his son about the late night escapades, though Elisa tells the son that the old man was watching cartoons and, because of his dementia, thinks what happened on TV happened in real life. As Elisa distracts the son, Jack tries to leave the apartment, until Mr. Templeton sees him. Jack explains his situation with Elisa to Mr. Templeton, which he understands, and promises Jack he will not tell his son anything more of the late nights.

At the 30 Rock studios, Jenna Maroney (Jane Krakowski) and Tracy Jordan (Tracy Morgan), the stars of TGS, decide they want to help the sick crew. They think about getting the crew soup but are too lazy to do it; instead they decide that laughter is the best medicine. Jenna and Tracy, dressed as clowns, put on a very unsuccessful show at the TGS stage where they end up throwing a pie on Liz's face. The crew stands up for Liz until they see the red dot where she received the shot. She confesses that she chose the vacation over the crew, as she later was told by Cerie that the hotel had rooms available, which results in the crew hating her for it. Later as she discusses the situation with Jack (who is dismissive of the crew concerns), both suffer adverse reactions to the shot.

== Production ==
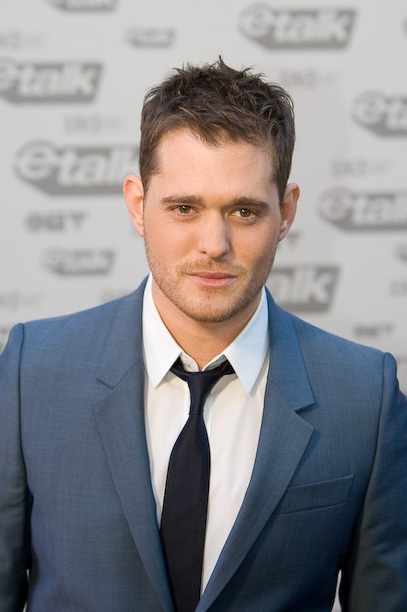
Michael Bublé performed the song "Mr. Templeton" in this episode.

"Flu Shot" was written by Jon Pollack and directed by Don Scardino. This was Pollack's second writing credit, having written season two episode "Greenzo". This was Scardino's seventeenth directed episode. "Flu Shot" originally aired on NBC as the eighth episode of the show's third season in the United States on January 15, 2009.

This episode was actress Salma Hayek's second appearance on 30 Rock as the character Elisa. She first appeared in the episode "Señor Macho Solo" as a nurse for Jack Donaghy's mother and love interest for Jack. In this episode, composer Jeff Richmond wrote a theme for the Elisa character. Actor Chris Parnell, who played Dr. Leo Spaceman in "Flu Shot", has appeared in the main cast of Saturday Night Live (SNL), a weekly sketch comedy series which airs on NBC in the United States. Series creator, executive producer and lead actress Tina Fey was the head writer on SNL from 1999 until 2006. Fey and Tracy Morgan have both been part of the main cast of SNL. Alec Baldwin, who plays Jack, has also hosted SNL fifteen times. This was Parnell's eighth appearance on the show. Actor Scott Bryce guest-starred as Michael Templeton, the son of Mr. Templeton (George Bartenieff), though Bryce would make an appearance on the show's fourth season episode "Don Geiss, America and Hope" as Dave Hess, a former colleague of Jack's.

According to Fey, in the DVD commentary for this episode, the show was not allowed to "say or imply" that the United States government had truly run out of flu shots, as many jokes in the original script were cut out. In addition, there were "a lot of meetings" in regards to where the red dot on Liz Lemon's arm would be. In the commentary, Fey revealed that the show had to ask Disney permission to "imply" that Jack and Elisa, while on their date, were in attendance at The Lion King musical, which was granted. The romantic scenes between Jack and Elisa, which showed them at a park at night, were filmed in front of a green screen. The show's producers initially wanted to go to different locations around New York, but believed it would be too hard to shoot. In addition, Liz's scenes at the beach were also shot in front of a green screen.

Canadian singer-songwriter Michael Bublé performed the song "Mr. Templeton" that was featured in this episode. In a January 2009 interview, the singer said he was notified by his manager that both Alec Baldwin and Salma Hayek—fans of the singer—hoped he could write a "funny little tune" to the "Flu Shot" episode, to which he agreed. Bublé was referenced in the previous episode, "Señor Macho Solo", as Hayek's character teases Baldwin's Jack over his many album collections of the singer. Bublé, a fan of 30 Rock, in an interview with Entertainment Weekly, said he was asked by the show to perform the song, and as a result, Bublé went to Canadian singer Bryan Adams' studio in Vancouver and recorded "Mr. Templeton" there.

== Reception ==
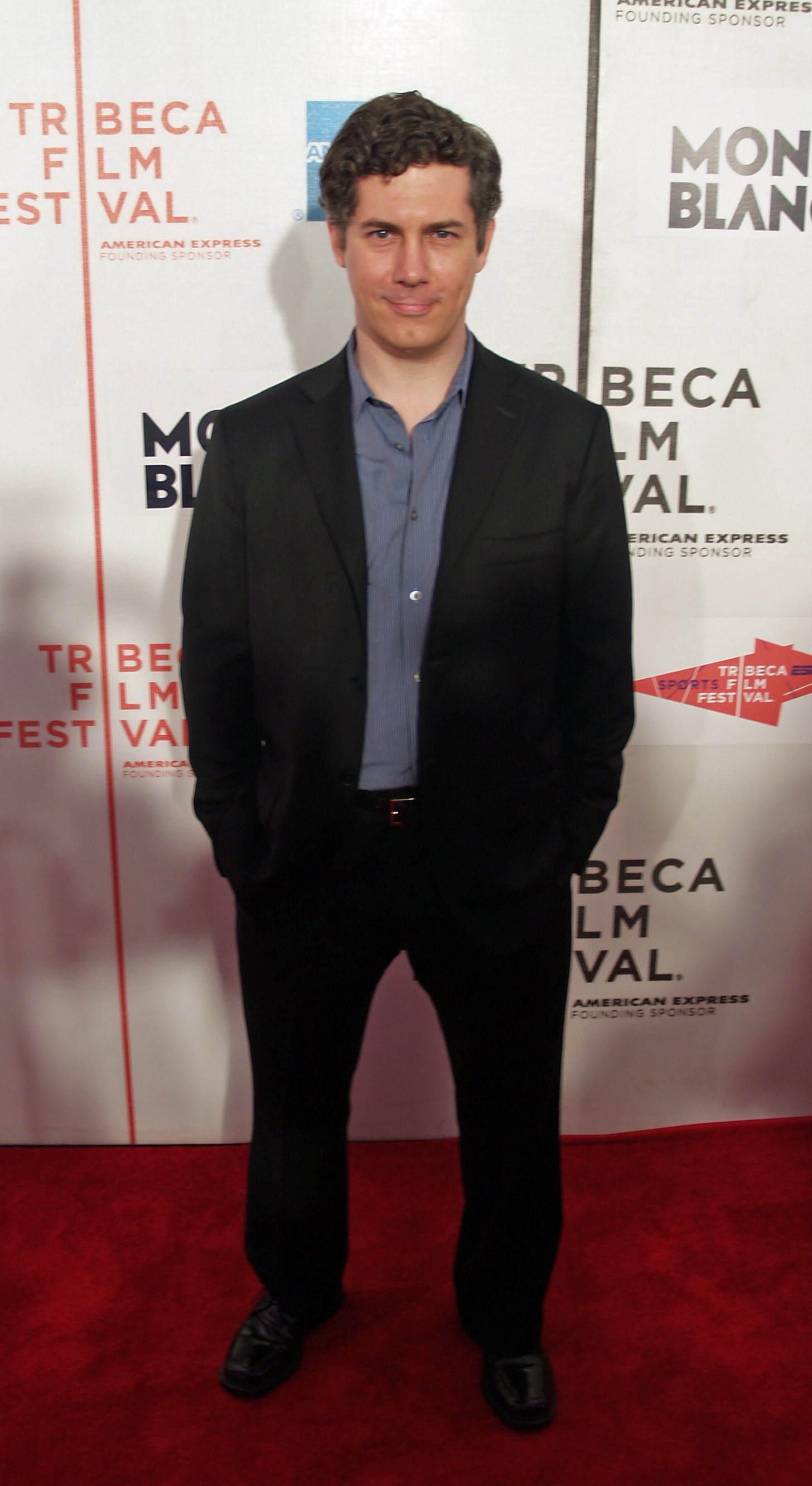
Alan Sepinwall of The Star-Ledger commented that the "long-awaited return" of Chris Parnell's 30 Rock character "wasn't as funny or ridiculous as it could have been".

According to the Nielsen ratings system, "Flu Shot" was watched by 6.6 million households in its original American broadcast. It earned a 3.2 rating/8 share in the 18–49 demographic. This means that it was seen by 3.2% of all 18- to 49-year-olds, and 8% of all 18- to 49-year-olds watching television at the time of the broadcast. This was an increase from the previous episode, "Señor Macho Solo", which was watched by 5.4 million American viewers.

Since airing, the episode has received a mixed response from television critics. IGN contributor Robert Canning said "Flu Shot" had a number of aspects that he enjoyed, but "as a whole" the episode was not completely satisfying, and reasoned that this episode fell below 30 Rock standards. He said that he personally did not buy the idea of Liz taking a tropical vacation, "[t]hat's just not the Liz I know. But even ignoring this, the bits involved, especially the flashes to Liz on the beach, weren't all that inspired." Canning also was critical of Jack and Elisa's story as he felt it was weak. Overall, he rated the episode a 7.6 out of 10. Bob Sassone of AOL's TV Squad wrote, "Is it just me or was this one of the more lacking episodes of 30 Rock? It's not that it was terrible ... but this one just seemed to meander. It wasn't as funny as other episodes ... and that whole crew-as-zombies-with-the-flu stuff was a little bit too surreal, even for this show." Further in his review, Sassone wrote that the Tracy and Jenna subplot started funny, but ended "in a lame, predictable manner." Television columnist Alan Sepinwall for The Star-Ledger, also disliked "Flu Shot", opining that it was a disappointment. Sepinwall further added that the Jack and Elisa story "felt like something out of a bad '80s sitcom – and not even the 30 Rock take on a bad '80s sitcom episode." Sepinwall, however, wrote that the episode did have a good moment with Kenneth suggesting to Tracy that he and Jenna get soup for the sick crew themselves, and with Tracy replying "With what? My arms?".

Not all reviews were negative. Claire Zulkey for The A.V. Club wrote, "For me, there are two types of episodes of 30 Rock: the really really good ones, where all the parts come together to make a wonderful whole, and the pretty good ones, where there memorable jokes and lines are all there, but put all together create a kind of uneven episode. That struck me as tonight's type of episode." Though, Zulkey felt that the zombies scene "didn't really work" except for when Liz smashed a picture frame over Pete Hornberger's (Scott Adsit) head. She said that the "funniest part" from "Flu Shot" was the look on Jack and Elisa's faces "as the animals from The Lion King walked through the audience." The Palm Beach Post’s Kevin D. Thompson, in his review of "Flu Shot", said it featured many funny lines.
