= Leap Day (30 Rock) =

- 30 Rock episode
- Episode no.: Season 6 Episode 9
- Directed by: Steve Buscemi
- Written by: Luke Del Tredici
- Production code: 609
- Original air date: February 23, 2012

Guest appearances
- James Marsden as Criss Chros; Jim Carrey as himself/Dave Williams; Andie MacDowell as herself/Claire Williams; Adriane Lenox as Sherry; Steve Little as Thad Warmald; John Cullum as Leap Day William; Karolína Kurková as herself; Devin Dunne Cannon as Future Liddy

Episode chronology
← Previous "The Tuxedo Begins"	Next → "Alexis Goodlooking and the Case of the Missing Whisky"
- 30 Rock season 6

"Leap Day" is the ninth episode of the sixth season of the American television comedy series 30 Rock, and the 112th overall episode of the series. It was directed by Steve Buscemi and written by Luke Del Tredici. The episode originally aired on NBC in the United States on February 23, 2012 and received positive reviews for its inventive script and the engaging performance by its guest stars. The episode revolves around star Liz Lemon (portrayed by Tina Fey) facing a crisis when presented with an extravagant sum of money to have sex with an old acquaintance, while her boss Jack Donaghy (Alec Baldwin) learns the true meaning of Leap Day and the possibilities it presents to mend broken relationships.

== Plot ==
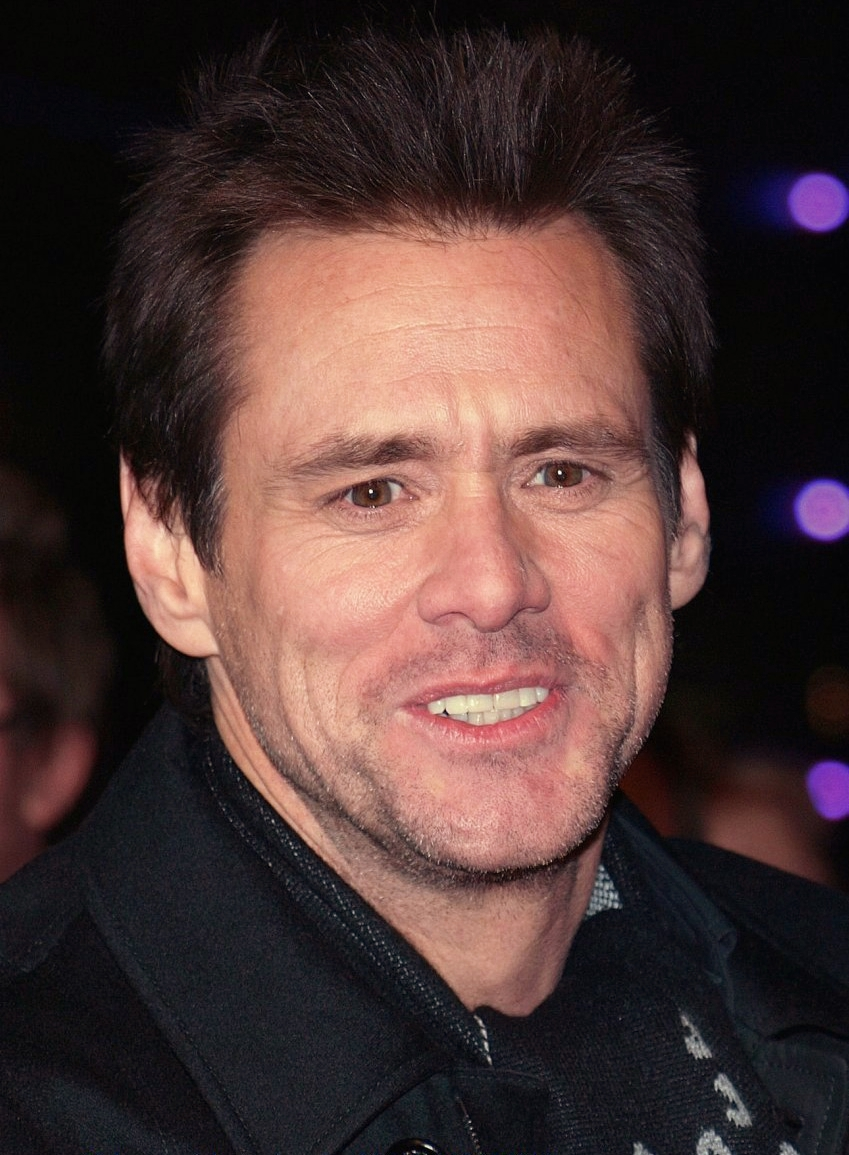
Jim Carrey plays a fictional character within the universe of 30 Rock who discovers the true meaning of Leap Day

The cast and writers celebrate the holiday of Leap Day with a Santa Claus-like mascot, a gilled creature named Leap Day William. Leap Day William lives in the Mariana Trench and emerges every four years to trade candy for children's tears. Jack introduces Kabletown's latest development in 3-D Internet access, but the ceremony becomes controversial when three people dressed as the letter K dance and then whip a black man. In a dream sequence induced by Jack eating poisonous rhubarb leaves, Kenneth (Jack McBrayer), as the spirit of Leap Day, takes Jack on a journey to see leap days past, present, and future. Twenty years from the present, Jack sees his daughter, Liddy (Devin Dunne Cannon), working for Habitat for Humanity and realizes that he needs to spend more time with her.

Tracy (Tracy Morgan) finds a $50,000 Benihana gift card that expires on that day, so he takes the TGS staff to the restaurant. On the way home, he meets a man dressed as Leap Day William (John Cullum), who is implied to be the real Leap Day William. Unable to spend all the money, he ultimately invites people from a soup kitchen to join him at Benihana.

Jenna (Jane Krakowski) persuades Liz to go to a Leap Day party thrown by Liz's college theater friend "Sad Thad, the skin tag lad" Warmald (Steve Little). Now a billionaire, Thad offers Liz $20 million to take his virginity, revealing that he has always had a crush on her. Before she can accept the proposal, Karolína Kurková and several other "hot bitches" show up. This causes Thad to lose interest in Liz, who leaves in frustration.

In the end tag, Leap Day William speaks to the camera, explaining that people should remember the magic of Leap Day all year long. Leap Day William tells the viewers that if they ever see an old man in a blue suit, they should stop and say hello. Suddenly, gills pop from his neck and he opens his mouth to reveal fangs.

== Production and reception ==
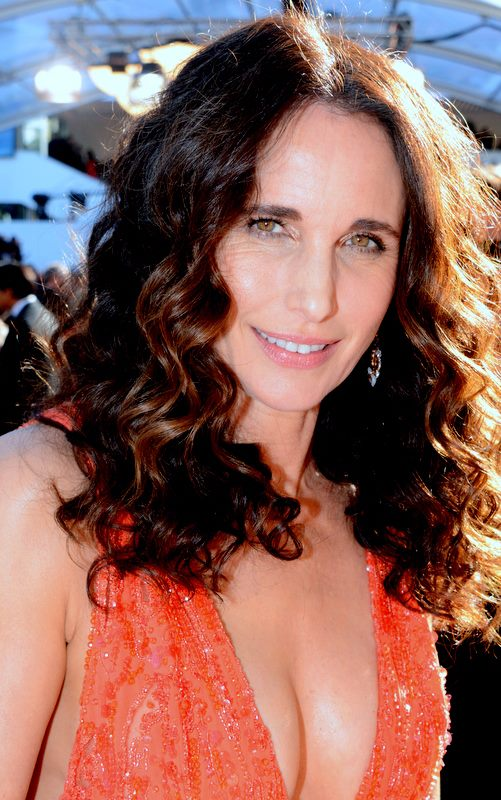
Critics praised Andie MacDowell for her performance in the Leap Day film

Several writers for 30 Rock decided on a Leap Day episode because the program missed the opportunity for a Christmas or New Year's Day story due to Fey's pregnancy.

"Leap Day" saw a small decline in ratings from the previous episode, garnering a 1.4/4 in the 18–49 demographic, translating to 3.42 million viewers.

The episode received universal acclaim from critics. James Poniewozik of Time said, "[T]he difference between a very amusing episode and a deathly awful one is a single, fresh idea... in the show's just-alternative universe, Leap Day is an actual holiday—complete with candy for the kids, Leap Day William emerging from the Mariana Trench and a cheesy Jim Carrey/Andie MacDowell holiday movie–unbeknownst only to us and Liz Lemon." The plot line with Liz and Thad, he said, was "a comically executed Indecent Proposal scenario."

Regarding the episode's Leap Dave Williams fictional film, Mary Cella of HLN said, "it was a highly effective guest spot because it seemed exactly like a movie [Carrey] would star in. Andie MacDowell's role as his wife was a brilliant nod to actual holiday classic Groundhog Day."

Breia Brissey of Entertainment Weekly liked the "fabulous Christmas Carol parody". Nathan Rabin of The A.V. Club considered the episode one of 30 Rock's best, declaring it "an unexpectedly sweet, if at times savagely satirical episode, that also has the virtue of being consistently funny and inventive." Several Leap Day sitcom episodes aired that week, and Slate's June Thomas considered this the strongest, noting that actual New Yorkers had been dressing in blue and yellow since the episode aired, to mimic Leap Day William.

In 2017, Vulture listed this as one of the 12 most essential 30 Rock episodes.

Meg Reticker was nominated for the Primetime Emmy Award for Outstanding Single-Camera Picture Editing for a Comedy Series based on this episode, but lost to Steven A. Rasch of Curb Your Enthusiasm.

== See also ==
- Leap Year, a 2010 romantic comedy film
- "Leap Day" (Modern Family), another 2012 sitcom episode celebrating the holiday
