= Standards and Practices (30 Rock) =

- 30 Rock episode
- Episode no.: Season 6 Episode 11
- Directed by: Beth McCarthy-Miller
- Written by: Vali Chandrasekaran
- Production code: 611
- Original air date: March 8, 2012

Guest appearances
- Chloë Grace Moretz as Kaylie Hooper; Ken Howard as Hank Hooper; Thomas Roberts as himself; Nicole Drespel as Judy Person; John Early as Jerome; Heléne Yorke as Jessica

Episode chronology
← Previous "Alexis Goodlooking and the Case of the Missing Whisky"	Next → "St. Patrick's Day"
- 30 Rock season 6

"Standards and Practices" is the eleventh episode of the sixth season of the American television comedy series 30 Rock, and the 114th overall episode of the series. It was directed by Beth McCarthy-Miller, and written by Vali Chandrasekaran. The episode originally aired on NBC in the United States on March 8, 2012.

In the episode, Jack (Alec Baldwin) battles teenage nemesis Kaylie Hooper (Chloë Grace Moretz); Liz (Tina Fey) chafes under the power of new network censor Kenneth (Jack McBrayer); and Jenna (Jane Krakowski) attempts to humanize her image by meeting the children produced from her egg donations.

== Plot ==
The finale of America's Kidz Got Singing is here and everyone's in high spirits, with Jack Donaghy (Alec Baldwin) proclaiming it's a "great night for the industry" because the show is "something the entire family can enjoy". However, that turns out to be the opposite of the truth when the final two contestants show up drunk on stage. As a result, the night quickly turns into a disaster. The next day, Kabletown CEO Hank Hooper (Ken Howard) shows up in Jack's office, furious that he now has to go to Washington DC to deal with the Federal Communications Commission. After questioning the contestants, Jack comes to the conclusion that it was Hank's granddaughter Kaylie Hooper (Chloë Grace Moretz) who got the contestants drunk. He confronts her, but discovers that Kaylie only did it so that she could get her grandfather out of town for the week. This way, he wouldn't attend a parent-teacher conference that she expects will get her expelled for hacking her friend's YouFace page and posting inflammatory pictures of her. Jack agrees to attend the conference instead to prevent her from getting expelled, but it turns out to be another one of Kaylie's tricks. She was trying to get expelled so she could attend a more prestigious boarding school and to be closer to her boyfriend who attends New York University for acting. However, Jack tricks her when he finds out about how she likes to play lacrosse, and can use his connections to make sure her school does not have a field to play on.

Meanwhile, the America's Kidz incident has caused a shake-up in the Standards department, as newly appointed Standards worker Kenneth Parcell (Jack McBrayer) is promoted to head of late night TV standards. This means that he will now be in charge of running the censors for TGS, which proves to be a problem when he creates a new list of over-the-top rules that prevent the show from using any words worse than "dingbat". Liz Lemon (Tina Fey) retaliates and tells him they will be saying whatever they want. However, when she finds Kenneth crying in the men's room (which she decided to go in when the ladies' room was being cleaned), she takes back her statements and agrees to keep it clean. Unfortunately, Liz had already told Tracy Jordan (Tracy Morgan) to perform his dirty stand-up special during the show. Ultimately, it's up to Kenneth to last-minute "live bleep" him.

Additionally, Jenna (who was planning to "cry" at one of the contestants' performance during the Kidz finale to "humanize" herself) decides to take a different route and meet one of the many children she has thanks to a series of egg donations she gave while living in Chicago. She immediately takes a liking to them - except for one, Judy (Nicole Drespel), who is significantly less attractive than the rest of them. Jenna kicks Judy out of the group, but soon regrets this after the rest of the kids kick Jenna out for being "too old". Jenna realizes Judy is the only child who proves she has any good in her and decides to get to know her better.

== Reception ==
=== Ratings ===
According to the Nielsen Media Research, this episode of 30 Rock was watched by 3.42 million households in its original American broadcast. It earned a 1.4 rating/4 share in the 18–49 demographic. This means that it was seen by 1.4 percent of all 18- to 49-year-olds, and 4 percent of all 18- to 49-year-olds watching television at the time of the broadcast.

=== Reviews ===
The episode received positive reviews from critics. Alan Sepinwall, writing for HitFix, noted that Season 6 had been a "very strong season so far" and felt that Standards & Practices was "even a cut above the best episodes they've done this year". He said it was bursting with "hilarious one-liners" and was very positive about the use of Chloë Grace Moretz as Kaylie Hooper, stating that she has been "a perfect foil for Jack: just as clever and ruthless (maybe even more), but wrapped up in a teen girl persona that both makes their rivalry much more ridiculous and constantly throws Jack off his game". He also praised the other plots, saying that the show has "seriously revitalized" the Kenneth character and that Jenna's plot "helped to humanize her". Nathan Rabin of The AV Club also responded positively to the episode, calling it a "standout episode" and stating it "was understatedly elegant in its storytelling and language".
