= Claire Zulkey =

American writer

- Born: April 15, 1979 (age 47); Evanston, Illinois
- Education: Georgetown University, Northwestern University
- Writing career
- Years active: 2002-present
- Notable work: An Off Year

Claire Zulkey (born April 15, 1979 in Evanston, Illinois) is an American writer, a 2001 graduate of Georgetown University, and the Northwestern University Creative Writing Masters program. She lives in Chicago, Illinois.

She is the author of the young adult book An Off Year published by Dutton in 2009 and selected by Indie Booksellers for the Autumn 2009 Kids' Indie Next List and cited as one of the ALA's 2010 Best Books for Young Adults. It was received positively, with Kirkus Reviews writing "Teens who have doubted the high-school–college-life progression for even a moment will recognize themselves in Cecily, perhaps to their parents’ dismay." and Publishers Weekly describing it as "a candid first novel filled with funny-smart, true-to-life observations and dialogue" She states that the book, based loosely on her own experiences, took over 10 years to write.

Zulkey has published the blog Zulkey.com since 2002. In 2011 NPR affiliate WBEZ began producing the site. The blog features humor writing and interviews with performers and authors. In 2006, The Smoking Gun cited Zulkey's interview with James Frey in its report A Million Little Lies. Zulkey is also a contributor at The A.V. Club and the Los Angeles Times. Zulkey produces the Chicago literary humor reading series Funny Ha-Ha, which describes itself as "The Best Reading in Chicago. Ever." Chicago Magazine has rated it one of the 10 best literary salons in Chicago.
