= Alexis Goodlooking and the Case of the Missing Whisky =

- 30 Rock episode
- Episode no.: Season 6 Episode 10
- Directed by: Michael Slovis
- Written by: John Riggi
- Production code: 610
- Original air date: March 1, 2012

Guest appearances
- Stanley Tucci as Henry Warren; Patti LuPone as Silvia Rossitano; Susan Sarandon as Lynn Onkman; Drew Gehling as Bradley Tarkin, Jr.

Episode chronology
← Previous "Leap Day"	Next → "Standards and Practices"
- 30 Rock season 6

"Alexis Goodlooking and the Case of the Missing Whisky" is the tenth episode of the sixth season of the American television comedy series 30 Rock, and the 113th overall episode of the series. It was directed by Michael Slovis, and written by John Riggi. The episode originally aired on NBC in the United States on March 1, 2012.

In the episode, Liz (Tina Fey) helps Frank (Judah Friedlander) hide his relationship with Lynn (Susan Sarandon) from his mother (Patti LuPone) by pretending to be his girlfriend; Jack (Alec Baldwin) advises Kenneth (Jack McBrayer) to destroy a potential rival in his new job; and Jenna (Jane Krakowski) uses skills from an old role to solve the mystery of who took Pete's (Scott Adsit) whisky.

== Plot ==
Frank's mother Silvia (Patti LuPone) confronts Liz (Tina Fey) in the writers' room for allegedly having an affair with Frank (Judah Friedlander). Silvia then realizes that she approves of the match. After his mother leaves, Frank admits to Liz that he lied about their relationship to cover up his longtime affair with his old middle school teacher, Lynn Onkman (Susan Sarandon). When he excuses Liz from dinner with Silvia by saying she is sick, Silvia shows up at Liz's apartment with Frank and a home-cooked Italian meal. Liz goes along with the charade for the food until Frank confesses to his mother and breaks up with Lynn. Although he claims to be fine, Liz realizes Frank is suffering and orchestrates a reunion with Frank, his mother, and Lynn. Eventually, Silvia accepts that Lynn and Frank love each other.

Jack (Alec Baldwin) meets Kenneth's new coworker, Bradley (Drew Gehling), in the standards and practices department. Jack quickly discerns Bradley is out to destroy Kenneth (Jack McBrayer). Jack advises Kenneth to destroy Bradley first, giving Kenneth some evidence that will help with doing so. Kenneth is reluctant and looks up an old colleague Jack had destroyed decades ago (Stanley Tucci), who in turn visits Jack. Jack feels guilty about turning Kenneth into a monster, but fails to persuade Kenneth to not go through with destroying Bradley. Kenneth has become as paranoid and ruthless as Jack was.

When someone in the office drinks Pete's special whisky, Jenna (Jane Krakowski) resurrects an old character of hers from a police show. She uses investigation skills she learned from the role to discover who drank it. With Tracy's help, Jenna learns that Toofer and Lutz are responsible. Rather than reveal the betrayal to Pete and break his heart, she forces the culprits to spend the evening with him and humor his boring anecdotes.

== Reception ==
This episode received mostly positive reviews. Critics particularly praised the performance of Jane Krakowski.
