= Kenneth Parcell =

Fictional character on "30 Rock"

- First appearance: "Pilot" (2006)
- Last appearance: "30 Rock: A One-Time Special" (2020)
- Created by: Tina Fey
- Portrayed by: Jack McBrayer

Andromakennethamblesorton "Kenneth" Ellen Parcell is a fictional character on the NBC comedy television series 30 Rock, portrayed by Jack McBrayer. Originally a supporting character in the first two episodes of the series, the show's producers saw him as a breakout character.

== Biography ==
Kenneth is a perpetually cheerful NBC page hailing from Stone Mountain, Georgia (an homage to the hometown of 30 Rock writer Donald Glover), raised in a pig farming family by parents he has alternatively claimed were first cousins and "technically brothers." He states that he loves only two things: "everybody and television". After graduating from an all-African-American high school, Kenneth studied at Kentucky Mountain Bible College, majoring in Television Studies and minoring in Bible Sexuality.

Throughout the series, Kenneth has painted a picture of a poverty-stricken, sexually deviant, inbred, criminal-class family line, declaring Parcells as a whole to be "neither wealthy nor circumcised." Furthering this point, he and his family lived in a militia camp during a period of time in his childhood and three of his nine siblings were given up for adoption. Kenneth has also alluded to his family subscribing to child marriage. During a drinking contest against a group of Teamsters, Kenneth discovers that he has unknowingly had alcohol before (which he calls "hill people milk",) and, because he has been drinking it "since [he] was a baby", he has a high tolerance, managing to keep up on his feet while everyone else competing in the contest gets blind drunk. (This essentially mirrored a scene from No Time for Sergeants, in which Andy Griffith portrayed a similar rube from backwoods Georgia.) Despite his high tolerance for liquor, Kenneth is very susceptible to the effect of caffeine, once going on an espresso-fueled bender and nearly returning to his home state in shame. In the episode "Black Light Attack," he reveals his teeth are wooden prosthetics.

Kenneth has a close relationship with his mother, Pearlene, considering her to be his best friend and crediting her with his optimism. (He quotes her as teaching him that no matter how bad things seem, there is always someone else having a worse day "like being stung by a bee, or getting a splinter, or being chained to a wall in someone's sex dungeon.") Apart from his death from a heart attack, not much else is known about Kenneth's father, although, in a deleted scene of "The One with the Cast of Night Court," Kenneth tells Tracy that Kenneth's father deliberately kept Pearlene unaware of their relationship as first cousins, as she would have not married him otherwise. In "Alexis Goodlooking and the Case of the Missing Whisky," it is revealed that Kenneth's father was the infamous D. B. Cooper, as that alias is seen on a sewn-in patch label on the inside of one of his father's former suits. Kenneth also quotes his father's final words as being "Son, if you want to get ahead in this world—oh God, this hurts! Tell your mother I'm gay!". After Kenneth's father died, his mother's "friend" Ron moved in with him and his mother. Many of Kenneth's comments about his mother and Ron suggest that the two had a sexual relationship, though Kenneth appears to be unaware of this. It is repeatedly implied throughout the series that he harbors a great hatred towards Ron (with Kenneth once commenting that he knew Tracy Jordan like "the back of [his] step-father Ron's hand.") This is confirmed in "Governor Dunston", wherein Ron and Pearlene (played by Bryan Cranston and Catherine O'Hara, respectively), visit Kenneth, who makes his dislike of Ron apparent. Contrary to what Kenneth's comments portrayed Ron to be, Ron is an amiable if dim-witted man who is shown to care for Kenneth like a father. Much to Kenneth's disdain, it is revealed that Pearlene and Ron married seven years prior (something of which Kenneth was unaware, contradicting the previous quote.) But by the end of the episode, he comes to accept Ron as an extension of the family. The series has also established Kenneth as the cousin of American Idol second season runner-up, Clay Aiken.

In "Chain Reaction of Mental Anguish", Kenneth reveals to his boss Jack Donaghy that, after his father died, he befriended a pig, whom he named Harold. Unfortunately, Kenneth's mother had to sell Harold to a slaughterhouse, and, with Harold gone, Kenneth had no reason to remain in Georgia, deciding to move to New York. He needed $300 for his ticket and in order to get the money, Kenneth participated in a pig-eating contest but, to his horror, the pig that he was given to eat was Harold. He has since been plagued by extreme remorse for eating his "father pig." However, Jack is able to convince him that by eating Harold, Kenneth gave his death meaning, as it allowed Kenneth to embark on his new life.

Kenneth may have been newly assigned to the TGS studio at the start of the series; in the pilot episode, Liz referred to Kenneth only as "that NBC page", suggesting they are not close. As the series progressed, however, Kenneth became more familiar with Liz and other staff and crew of TGS with Tracy Jordan.

As demonstrated many times throughout the series, Kenneth is incredibly selfless, one of the most notable examples occurring in the episode "Believe in the Stars," when he and others are trapped in an elevator. Jack claims that there is enough air for eight people, but, as the elevator contains nine, he announces that one occupant must die. Kenneth is appalled by Jack's statement, and when Jack tells him that he has placed a pistol loaded with one bullet in the emergency box, Kenneth removes the gun, holds it to his head and pulls the trigger (not just once, but twice, when it does not discharge the first time.) Finding the gun inoperable, he wraps his belt around his neck and urges the others to strangle him. Jack, disgusted by Kenneth's altruism, abruptly opens the elevator door and demands, "What is wrong with you?"

When he is passing out from a severe allergy episode, Kenneth exclaims that his real name is Dick Whitman (a reference to the AMC drama, Mad Men.) Kenneth has demonstrated a knack for conceptualizing rather unusual television shows, one of which (a game show called Gold Case) was actually developed, although it turned out to be ill-conceived and was promptly shut down. In a pretend interview with Conan O'Brien, Kenneth shares his dreams of making "hit movies" with Zach Braff, and that he is also skilled at clogging.

Kenneth has been shown to be able to speak numerous foreign languages, including Mandarin, French, German, and Latin. He can also speak backwards with ease, is capable of ventriloquism, and claims that he can take commands from animals. He is an unintentionally skilled poker player, with his thoughts being indecipherable to his opponents, since, according to TGS writer Frank Rossitano, "he doesn't have any." Kenneth has also been shown to wear a concealed firearm.

Kenneth has technically died two different times: his first death occurs in "The Ones", when he deliberately underwent anaphylaxis and, as a result, was clinically deceased for five minutes. (He later claims that he believes he "brought something back with [him,]" as his breath crystallizes in the air and an ominous shadow passes over him.) He dies once again in the episode "College", when he contracted hypothermia on the balcony to Jack's office and briefly died, returning with a message from God, which he forgot. Possibly in connection with his first death, later episodes show Kenneth arguing with an unknown entity whom he addresses as "Jacob" (which may or may not be a reference to the character from Lost who possesses the power to grant immortality.) Most of Kenneth's arguments with Jacob concern the fate of the TGS staff. It has also been established that Kenneth perceives people as singing Muppets, and in one instance, when walking past an HD camera, appeared as a Muppet himself. In "Ludachristmas", Kenneth states that he had "a 'coke' problem, during [his] 'Wall Street' days." However, a flashback reveals that he actually had developed an addiction to the soft drink Coca-Cola, when he was employed at Blockbuster Video, during the time that the 1987 film Wall Street was popular on home video. He has been shown to require medication to keep him from acting like a donkey. As the series has progressed, Kenneth's morality has become questionable, with dubious behavior including rooming with John Mark Karr in college and sharing an apartment with an elderly catatonic woman who he keeps in his closet.

There have been many comments, made by both Kenneth himself and others, that hint at him possessing a supernatural nature. In the episode "Operation Righteous Cowboy Lightning", Kenneth reveals to Liz that he is unable to see his reflection, as when he looks into a mirror, "There is only a white haze" (however, this statement conflicts with an earlier episode, "Klaus and Greta.") The episode "Standards and Practices" implies that Kenneth has some sort of clone, as when Liz asks him "Do you have a second, Kenneth?", he misunderstands and nervously blurts out "No, there's only one of me.". When Tracy regains his ability to smell in "Nothing Left to Lose", he notices that Kenneth has no scent at all, a discovery which Kenneth cheerfully brushes off. Kenneth accidentally reveals to Hazel Wassername in "What Will Happen to the Gang Next Year?" that he does not sleep. "St. Patrick's Day" also establishes a physical deformity: a rabbit foot-resembling tail he had until he was 16 years old, which he gives to Hazel for good luck.

A relationship with Hazel is first hinted at in "What Will Happen to the Gang Next Year?." After Kenneth discovers that Hazel sabotaged his chances to become an NBC page again, she manipulates him by claiming to have developed feelings for him and successfully seduces him. It is confirmed that they are now dating in the seventh season premiere, however, it is also revealed that she is only using Kenneth to get close to Tracy so that Tracy would cast her in a movie and in effect launch her career in show business, a plan which fails because of Tracy's devotion to Kenneth. Kenneth and Hazel still remain in the relationship up until she is fired for her actions in the episode "Aunt Phatso vs. Jack Donaghy."

Despite his positivity, Kenneth has more situational awareness than he lets others normally see, in one instance explicitly confessing to Jack that the only grasp he has on his optimism is by lying to himself. In general, Jack has stated that Kenneth's Myers–Briggs Type Indicator "shows a rare combination of extroverted, intuitive, and aggressive" (which is the same as his own), claiming that "in five years we'll all either be working for him... or be dead by his hand." A little more than six years later, Jack fulfills his own prophecy by appointing Kenneth to replace him as president of NBC, thus making all but Jonathan and himself work for Kenneth.

== Views ==
Kenneth's religious views are mainly a satirically exaggerated form of Christian fundamentalism, being a follower of a sect called "Eighth Day Resurrected Covenant of the Holy Trinity." The church is located in the basement of a Cuban restaurant and is led by a fire and brimstone preacher, named Rev. Gary (who is frequently implied to be a hebephile.) As such, Kenneth's definitions of what constitutes sin and righteousness are ridiculously anal retentive, ranging from not believing in hypothetical situations (comparing it to "lying to your brain") to refusing to drink hot beverages as that is "the Devil's temperature," among other oddities.

Kenneth often offers religious advice to others, such as in "Black Tie", when he advises Pete to think of God in order to prevent him from cheating on his wife. In "Christmas Special," when Liz believes that she was conned by two adults who scammed her through the letters to Santa program, Kenneth refuses to believe anyone would scam a Christmas charity, further demonstrating his naivete when he asks Liz, "When has religion ever caused any trouble?" Kenneth carries no political views as "choosing is a sin." Instead, he always submits write-in votes for God (however, according to Jack, those count as Republican.)

Kenneth reads the Bible only in German, declaring it the only way "to get all the versteckte Bedeutungen (hidden meanings)". He believes that the Earth was created a mere 800 years ago, that there is a Heaven and Hell for each ethnicity and, when he goes to Heaven, he expects to be rewarded with "72 virgin... margaritas." Despite referring to God as singular, Kenneth proclaims a God for independent foods, saying grace over dinner to the "Onion God," "Carrot God," and so forth. In the episode "Greenzo," Kenneth states that he intends to "party like it's 1999," a date which, according to his Bible, will occur in seven years. He has also mentioned a sister, who, similar to the story of the Virgin Mary, became pregnant despite never having sex.

In various episodes, Kenneth is shown to be considerably uneducated and disrespectful of other religions. In "Christmas Special", while passing out gifts to the TGS writing staff, he wishes Josh Girard a "merry Jewish"; in "Secret Santa", he sets up a multi-faith holiday display, which includes a framed photo of Barack Obama, that Kenneth states is "for the Muslims"; in "100", when Jenna, who wants to have a baby, tries to seduce him, he refuses, on the grounds that they are unmarried and part of different religions; in "Standards and Practices", he comments that the Jewish network executives are "trained from birth to argue".

In "Believe in the Stars," when Jack tells Kenneth that he knows the Ten Commandments, Kenneth snorts and says "Ten?", implying that he follows more. In "100", he calls Darwin's Theory of Evolution "crazy". In "Respawn", Kenneth reveals that he believes the phrase "No, thank you", to be vulgar language. The episode "The Funcooker" implies that he prefers the clean shaven look, as when Liz places him in charge, he bans beards and moustaches in the workplace. In "Alexis Goodlooking and the Case of the Missing Whisky", Kenneth informs Jack, who is attempting to convince Kenneth to professionally ruin a potential rival in his new job, that he has never "crushed" anyone before, except for accused witches.

Kenneth's family are staunch supporters of the Confederacy, with Jack once proclaiming Kenneth a foreigner since Kenneth's home of DeKalb County, Georgia "never rejoined the Union." As such, Kenneth's schooling consisted of Confederacy propaganda and his home culture consisted of bizarre anti-Union rituals. The traditional burial for Parcell men is to have their body wrapped in a Confederate flag, fried, and fed to dogs. Kenneth once served a family recipe he says he altered by replacing the ingredient of "Union Soldier meat" with boiled potatoes. Kenneth also possesses $76,000 in Confederate currency.

Although he is respectful to others, male and female alike, Kenneth has displayed some harshly misogynistic opinions; in "The Funcooker", when he is put in charge, his first order is to have all menstruating women leave the workplace immediately. In "The Ones", Kenneth implies to Liz that girls are generally bad in math and that girls should shut their mouths in math class. In "Stone Mountain", Kenneth tells Jack that he finds female airline pilots humorous. In "TGS Hates Women", he reveals that he wants his legacy to be a Sesame Street-esque show that "promotes illiteracy in girls". In "100", he states that he believes it is "crazy" that women have the right to choose their own haircuts. In "Alexis Goodlooking and the Case of the Missing Whisky", he refuses to work in Ad Sales any longer, due to the fact that numerous of their sponsors make housework easier for women. In "Standards and Practices", he calls gynecologists "disgusting".

== Immortality ==
While Kenneth appears to be in his mid to late twenties (McBrayer was actually 33 years old at the show's start, and 39 when it ended), it has been implied numerous times since the third season that he is actually much older.

This is first hinted at in "The One with the Cast of Night Court", when Kenneth states, "I've worn this old jacket since 19-hubeduh", intentionally mumbling the year.

In the episode "Cutbacks", Kenneth states that he has owned his pet bird Sonny Crockett for almost 60 years, implying that it wasn't named after the Miami Vice character.

In a deleted scene from "Mamma Mia", it is implied that he is a veteran of World War II, as he is recognized by an elderly man as one of his fellow troops who served in Normandy.

In the episode "Into the Crevasse", Kenneth appears in a 1950s-era flashback, dancing to the song "Doin' the Microwave".

In the episode "The Baby Show", Dr. Spaceman has a pamphlet on his desk, that reads "Never Die" with a picture of Kenneth on it.

In "Subway Hero", to Jack's puzzlement, Kenneth recognizes Bucky Bright, a celebrity who was described as being active in the "40s and 50s." Similarly, in the episode "Verna", Kenneth states that The Today Show has not been as good since chimpanzee J. Fred Muggs was featured on the show, implying that he watched the program when the primate served as the show's mascot, which was from 1953 to 1957.

In "The Problem Solvers", when Tracy asks him if he "want[s] to be a page forever", Kenneth nervously asks "Who said I've been alive forever?".

In "Future Husband", Kenneth states that he remembers Jenna's first acting role in a commercial that aired in the 1970s, commenting that she was "a fat baby".

In "Don Geiss, America and Hope", when NBC is bought out by Kabletown, Kenneth becomes worried and asks Jack if they will be implementing new rules for pages, such as "age limits and age verification".

In "Black Light Attack!", Frank uses a cellphone app to generate a high frequency pitch that only young ears can hear, as well as a low frequency pitch only people over 40 can hear; while Frank is using the low-frequency pitch, Kenneth stumbles past the writers' room, screaming, "What is happening to me?!" implying that the low-pitched tone is deafeningly loud to his ears.

In "When it Rains, it Pours", Kenneth is seen packing away an autographed photo of Fred Allen from 1947, that is dedicated: "Kenneth, you're the TOPS!", into a box marked "NBC Memories 1945-1967".

In "¡Qué Sorpresa!", when he comes up with the idea of BlaBar, a black bar that would cover the lower half of a television screen as to censor material considered inappropriate, he mentions how elderly viewers are offended by certain things that are on TV, subtly gesturing to himself while saying so.

In the episode "TGS Hates Women", Kenneth comments that, when he first started working as a page at NBC, an 8-year-old Shirley Temple taught him to roll cigarettes, in 1936.

In "Queen of Jordan", Kenneth's chyron reads "Kenneth Parcell: Elderly Page".

During a flash-forward, in the episode "100", Kenneth, Tracy, and Jenna speculate where they will be in five years. The scene then shows three tombstones, with Kenneth's year of birth appearing to be listed as 1781 (although the second digit is partially obscured by a leaf in multiple shots). If this birth date is accurate, it would mean that Kenneth is over 200 years old (it is also worth noting that, while he is buried, his arm bursts from his grave to give a thumbs-up to the camera, further supporting the theory that he is immortal).

In "Respawn", while talking to Jack he states in his apartment there are only white cockroaches while pointing to himself indicating that he is unable to die. "Today You Are a Man", when Suze Orman asks him his age, he simply replies "Don't worry about it". In "Leap Day", when Jack tells him to take off his bald cap (as he is impersonating Leap Day William), Kenneth awkwardly replies "Yes, take off my bald cap, not put on my wig", implying that he is actually bald.

In "Nothing Left to Lose", he implies that he is an angel, which could possibly be the secret behind his apparent immortality.

In "Meet the Woggels!", Kenneth reveals that the only Rock and Roll song he has ever listened to is Mr. Sandman, which was released in 1954.

In "Live from Studio 6H", he is shown as a page during a flashback to an old NBC News Report.

In "Governor Dunston", his mother recalls how, on the day he was born, Kenneth informed her that his body was just a "flesh vessel" for an immortal being.

In the series finale, after years of implications and clues, it is finally confirmed once and for all that Kenneth is indeed immortal when he is revealed in the distant future to have not aged. Decades earlier, at the start of his tenure as NBC president in "Hogcock!", he presents Liz with a list of "TV no-no words" that includes "immortal character," among other phrases that describe 30 Rock, such as "New York," "high concept" and "shows about shows".

In the intervening time, he apparently changes his mind, as he greenlights Liz's great-granddaughter's pitch for a period piece based upon the stories she had heard from Liz growing up. The series violates every one of the earlier no-no words; set at 30 Rockefeller Plaza in the early 21st century, it is 30 Rock, and Kenneth loves it.

== Reception ==
The Kenneth Parcell character has received highly positive reviews and was dubbed a breakout character, moving into the main cast beginning in season two. Slate Magazine named the character as one of the reasons they were looking forward to the return of the show in fall 2007. On The Extratextuals website, Kenneth is placed as number 49 on their list of 50 Best TV Characters.

In 2016, he was listed as the top 30 Rock character by IndieWire, ahead of Liz Lemon: "But most importantly of all, 30 Rock was by and large about how great and wonderful television can be. And no one loves television more than Kenneth." On The Top Tens.com, he is also listed as the best character on the show, with the website commenting "[...] Kenneth is one of the best television characters I can remember. Perhaps second only to Dwight Schrute". CST Online wrote "Perhaps 30 Rock’s most brilliant comic creation is Kenneth Parcell". Nerve.com wrote, "Kenneth the page's naiveté and chinlessness spark endless comedy on the show. He might be a little repetitive, sure, but he's also got the highest laughs-to-screentime ratio of anyone out there."

However, the character has received negative reaction, as well. The A.V. Club listed Kenneth on its list of television "Showblockers," writing "[...] Kenneth has been wrung especially dry in recent seasons, made into an ever-more-outsized caricature of sycophancy, fundamentalism, and hickdom". Dustin Rowles, of Pajiba.com, listed Kenneth as a television character that should be killed off, writing "He was a great character for a few seasons, but Kenneth is useless to the show now".

For his portrayal, McBrayer received a Primetime Emmy Award nomination, a Creative Arts Emmy nomination, and seven Screen Actors Guild Award nominations, winning one.
