= List of 30 Rock characters =

30 Rock is an American television comedy series, created by Tina Fey, that aired on NBC. The series takes place behind the scenes of a fictional live sketch comedy series, also airing on NBC; the name "30 Rock" refers to the address of the GE Building, where NBC Studios is located (30 Rockefeller Plaza). The series has an ensemble cast consisting of 14 regular cast members: Tina Fey, Alec Baldwin, Tracy Morgan, Jane Krakowski, Jack McBrayer, Scott Adsit, Judah Friedlander, Katrina Bowden, Keith Powell, Lonny Ross, John Lutz, Kevin Brown, Grizz Chapman, and Maulik Pancholy.

== Main characters ==
The seven main cast members appear during the opening credits, while later additions receive star billing after the credits.

Main character appearance summary

Character	Portrayed by	Seasons							Special
Character	Portrayed by	1	2	3	4	5	6	7	Special
Liz Lemon	Tina Fey	Main	Main	Main	Main	Main	Main	Main	Main
Tracy Jordan	Tracy Morgan	Main	Main	Main	Main	Main	Main	Main	Main
Jenna Maroney	Jane Krakowski	Main	Main	Main	Main	Main	Main	Main	Main
Kenneth Parcell	Jack McBrayer	Main	Main	Main	Main	Main	Main	Main	Main
Pete Hornberger	Scott Adsit	Main	Main	Main	Main	Main	Main	Main	Main
Frank Rossitano	Judah Friedlander	Main	Main	Main	Main	Main	Main	Main	Main
Jack Donaghy	Alec Baldwin	Main	Main	Main	Main	Main	Main	Main	Main
Cerie Xerox	Katrina Bowden	Recurring	Starring	Starring	Starring	Starring	Starring	Starring	
James "Toofer" Spurlock	Keith Powell	Recurring	Starring	Starring	Starring	Starring	Starring	Starring	Main
Josh Girard	Lonny Ross	Recurring	Starring	Starring	Starring				
Dot Com	Kevin Brown	Recurring	Recurring	Starring	Starring	Starring	Starring	Starring	
Grizz	Grizz Chapman	Recurring	Recurring	Starring	Starring	Starring	Starring	Starring	Main
Jonathan	Maulik Pancholy	Recurring	Recurring	Starring	Starring	Starring		Starring	Main
J.D. Lutz	John Lutz	Recurring	Recurring	Recurring	Starring	Starring	Starring	Starring	Main

=== Liz Lemon ===
Elizabeth Miervaldis Lemon (Tina Fey), the series' protagonist, is head writer of TGS with Tracy Jordan. Jack Donaghy describes her as a "New York third-wave feminist, college-educated, single-and-pretending-to-be-happy-about-it, over-scheduled, undersexed, you buy any magazine that says 'healthy body image' on the cover and every two years you take up knitting for... a week". Lemon is a Star Wars fan and is portrayed as a "geek." She also lacks certain social skills and is a stress eater, particularly ingesting junk food. She is generally shown to have liberal political views. Despite her high standards in men, personified in her imaginary perfect husband, Astronaut Mike Dexter, Lemon has had some "really terrible boyfriends", but eventually finds happiness with Criss Chross, with whom she adopts two children.

=== Tracy Jordan ===
Tracy Jordan (Tracy Morgan) is the loose-cannon star of TGS. He is a movie star with a reputation for erratic behavior. This reputation is well-deserved; much of it is an intentional attempt on his part to maintain his "crazy" persona in the eyes of the media. In the pilot episode, Jack Donaghy forces Liz Lemon to hire Tracy as the new star of her sketch comedy program The Girlie Show. To the chagrin of Liz and Jenna, Jack renames the show TGS with Tracy Jordan in the following episode. Tracy has remained the star of TGS ever since.

=== Jenna Maroney ===
Jenna Maroney (Jane Krakowski) is the histrionic costar of TGS and Liz's best friend and former roommate. Though a talented singer, she is often shown as being extremely insecure about herself. A recurring motif in the show is Jenna's pursuit of fame through some ill-advised project ending up in public humiliation from which she never learns. She is a self-described "soul-sucking monster". Off-camera she is comically conceited, frequently lying about her age and attempts, but fails, to use her sexuality to manipulate men (almost always to disastrous effect).

=== Kenneth Parcell ===
Kenneth Ellen Parcell (Jack McBrayer) is a cheerful, obedient Southern-born NBC page who "lives for television". In the early episodes, Kenneth seemed unfamiliar with some of Liz's staff (and Liz herself). In the pilot, Liz refers to Kenneth as "that NBC page". As the series progressed, his character became familiar with the other staff of TGS (including Jack Donaghy). Kenneth acts as Tracy Jordan's personal assistant (for instance, getting Tracy nachos from Yankee Stadium); he is a member of Tracy's entourage and becomes close to Tracy, Grizz, and Dot Com. By the end of the series, he ends up as the president of NBC.

It is revealed several times over the course of the show that not only may Kenneth not sleep, be immortal, and possibly be a clone, but also as stated by his mother (portrayed by Catherine O'Hara) that at the time of his birth he said to her, "Mama, I am not a person. My body is just a flesh vessel for an immortal being whose name, if you heard it, would make you lose your mind."

=== Pete Hornberger ===
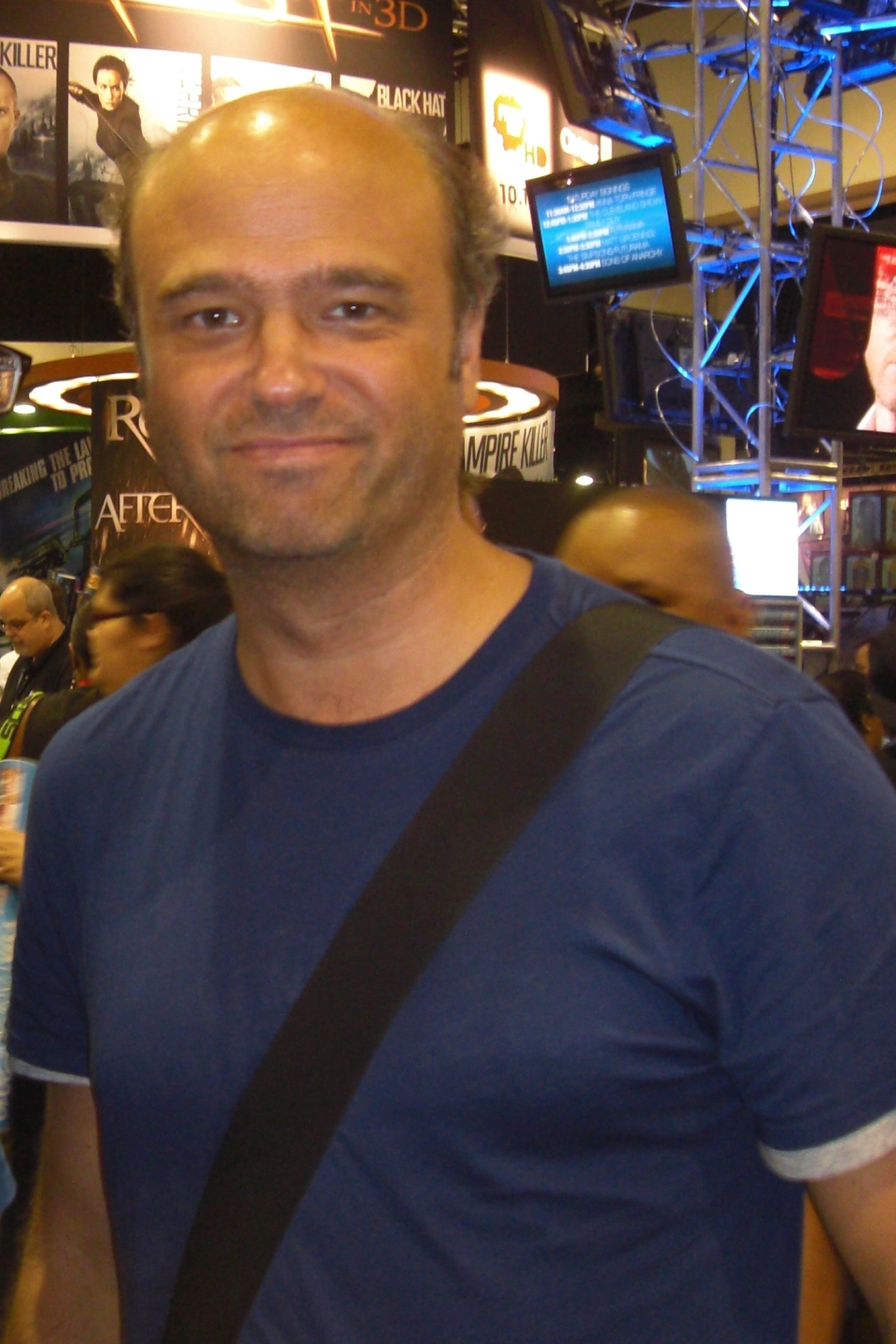
Scott Adsit portrays Pete Hornberger

Peter Hornberger (Scott Adsit) is the producer of TGS, who often serves as a straight man to the other characters. He works closely with and serves as a trusted friend to Liz, whom, as stated in "Blind Date", he has known for ten years.

In early seasons, Pete is Liz's closest friend at work and the only one she can rely on. Much like Liz, Pete generally plays straight man to the other characters, especially to Liz when she is temporarily pushed over the edge. Prior to his work on TGS, Pete was a skilled archer qualified to compete in the 1980 Summer Olympics, but lost his chance when President Carter decided to boycott the Moscow Games. Four years later, a case of "the yips" led him to botch his chance at making the 1984 Olympics in Los Angeles. He was a member of the band Loverboy during his teenage years and his father was a member of the United States Congress.

Pete is married to Paula, with whom he has four sons and a daughter; her back-to-back pregnancies forced him to drop out of college twice. Aside from a brief scene in the pilot where Pete appears at home with one of his sons, the members of his family were unseen characters until the episode "Greenzo". In one episode, Pete reveals that he is afraid of his son Kyle, who is apparently very strong and, in "Black Tie", he spoke with his son Kaleb over the telephone, pretending to be popular fictional character Elmo, to encourage his son to "aim your pee-pee at the potty." In "Greenzo", Liz mentions he has three sons named Robert and Jack, and an unnamed one referred to as "that creepy little one who's always rubbing himself on the carpet". In the episode "Anna Howard Shaw Day", his daughter Evelyn is selling cookies for a school fundraiser. His wife, Paula, is implied to have a rather overbearing personality and Pete often goes to great lengths to make her happy, as in "Up All Night" when he realized that it was Valentine's Day, which also happens to be his wife's birthday. Pete also passed when one of Tracy's entourage expressed interest in him during that episode, showing that he may not always be happy in his marriage but he remains faithful. In the episode "Tracy Does Conan", Pete stated that his wife wishes he was not bald and, in "Black Tie", Pete mentions that they were married in a botanical garden. He lied to his wife about getting a vasectomy, but, as of "The Fighting Irish", she is becoming suspicious. Therefore, Pete has asked Liz for the keys to her apartment for "my own safety." He is still living with Liz as of "Greenzo." However, Liz finds out that Pete and Paula are having an "affair" where they sneak around and use her apartment for trysts that include silk scarves and Pop-Tarts; Pete tells her that he and his wife got pregnant almost immediately after they began dating and have never had an exciting romantic/sexual life because of that, so they have found this way to spark their marriage.

With his role of Liz's confidant increasingly filled by Jack Donaghy, Pete played increasingly reduced roles as the series continued, although his marital woes and inability to catch a break were increasingly mined for humor. Jack pities Pete for his aimlessness and unattractive appearance, and occasionally attempts to boost his confidence, beginning by convincing him to wear a wig for a week in "Tracy Does Conan." In "Nothing Left to Lose", Jack is shocked to find out that Pete's only ambition is to remain in his current job. Jack attempts to help Pete by having him make adjustments to his lifestyle, including shaving off what remains of his hair. Unfortunately, it is revealed that his ring of hair was hiding an obscene birthmark that Jack describes as "a swastika made of penises", leading him to be beaten in the street and forced to wear another wig.

When TGS is canceled in "Last Lunch", Pete implies repeatedly he is planning to fake his death and escape from his life and family. He succeeds in doing so, setting up a new identity under the name "Dan Silversmith" in Hickory, North Carolina, but is tracked down a year later by his wife and meekly returns to his previous existence.

=== Frank Rossitano ===
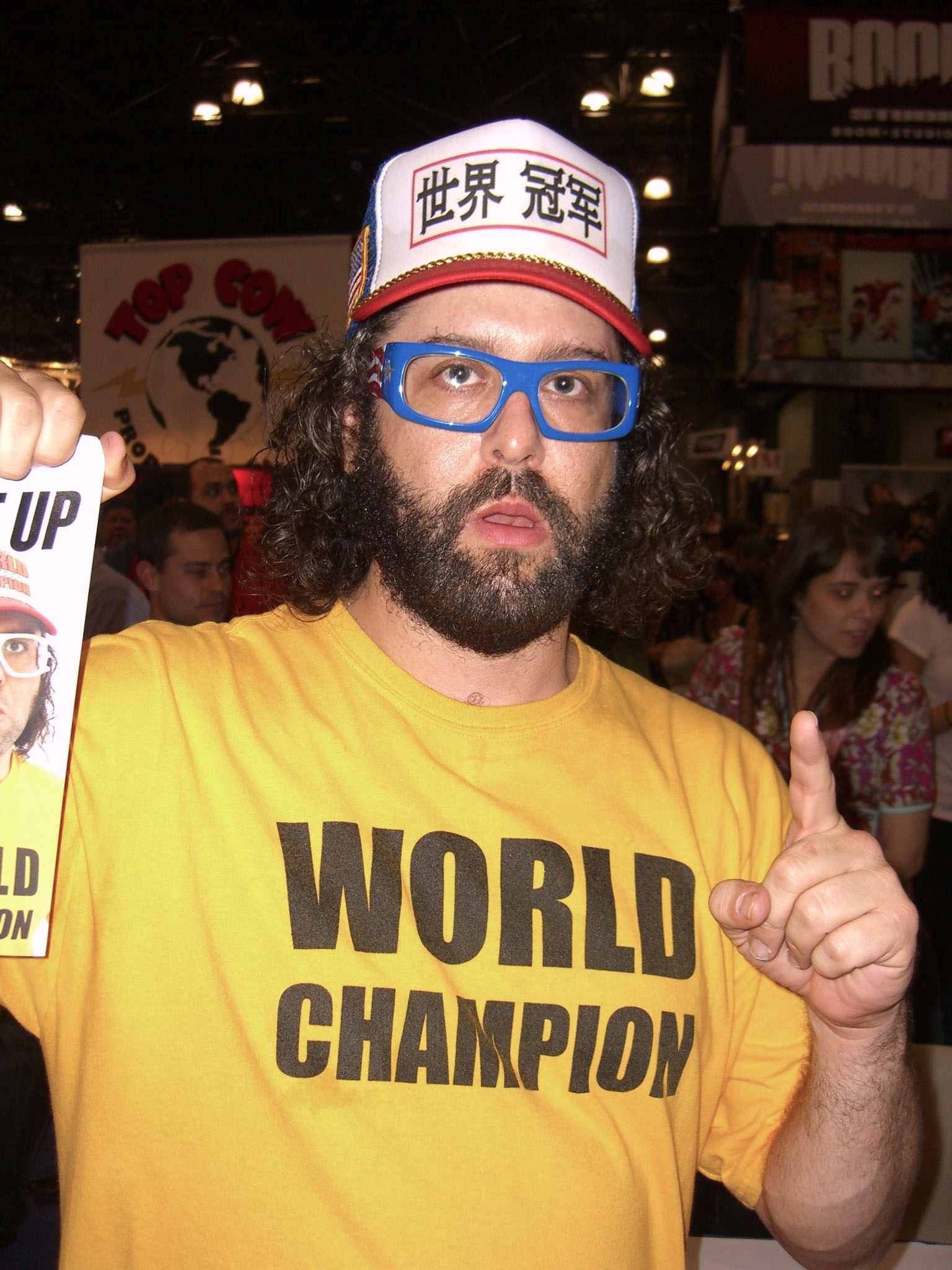
Judah Friedlander portrays Frank Rossitano

Francis "Frank" Rossitano (Judah Friedlander; Fred Armisen in select scenes of "Live from Studio 6H") is a writer at TGS of Sicilian descent. After Liz, Frank is the most prominently featured and prolific writer of the show-within-a-show. Frank is habitually slovenly and childish; he lives with his mother and is an aficionado of video games, comic books and figurines, and pornography. He wears a variety of trucker hats with humorous phrases (which Friedlander also wears in real life) and large, thick-lensed glasses. Frank delivers most lines in a deadpan style, and is often shown to be something of a perverse character with an obvious interest in the opposite gender (although in one episode Frank questions his sexuality after meeting a physically attractive man named Jamie), Frank appears to have an understanding of popular culture and sometimes displays surprising amounts of intelligence. Frank is allergic to peanuts. In "Audition Day", it is revealed that (as Friedlander is in real life) he is a standup comedian.

Friedlander said he made the hats for his character himself, using phrases he invented; in "Jackie Jormp-Jomp", when Liz is suspended from work, one of her final requests before being forced out of the building was to know what Frank's hat said. Frank first started wearing the hats at age 14; his eighth-grade class photo shows him in a hat reading "My First Hat".

Frank was raised largely in Queens by his mother, Sylvia, after his father, a lawyer for the mafia, went into the Witness Protection Program. Sylvia's fear for her son led him to leave law school at her insistence and enter comedy. In "Goodbye, My Friend", Jack Donaghy learns of Frank's legal aspirations and offers him a scholarship to Columbia University Law School, but reneges on his offer after Sylvia warns him of the danger in which a law career would place Frank due to his family's mafia connections. Frank pursues women frequently, usually older, psychologically damaged, or physically unattractive women he considers "low-hanging fruit", though it is hinted in the episode "Jackie Jormp-Jomp" that he and Cerie had a secret relationship. The great love of Frank's life occurred at the age of 14, where he had an affair with his middle-school teacher, Lynn Onkman, who fell in love with him during his scoliosis test. She was sent to prison for the offense, but he remained in love with her and after her release ("Queen of Jordan"), they reconciled and began a relationship despite the objections of everyone else.

=== Jack Donaghy ===
John Francis Donaghy (Alec Baldwin) is the decisive, controlling, suave network executive who must deal with (and/or causes) unusual events at TGS. He is an Irish Catholic and a Republican who has suppressed his Boston accent. Donaghy is portrayed as a slick, brilliant and scrupulous network executive who directs many overtly backhanded compliments to Liz. Lemon (as he refers to her) and Donaghy have a work spouse relationship and were briefly technically married owing to a translation issue at his second wedding. Jack was married two times (and engaged two other times), and with his second wife, television reporter Avery Jessup, he has a daughter, Elizabeth "Liddy" Donaghy, named after Liz Lemon. Avery and Jack were divorced after her return from North Korea (where she was held hostage by Kim Jong Il) when they admit they only married because of Avery's pregnancy. Shortly after becoming the CEO of Kabletown, Jack suffered an emotional crisis and resigned, only to return to General Electric.

=== Cerie ===
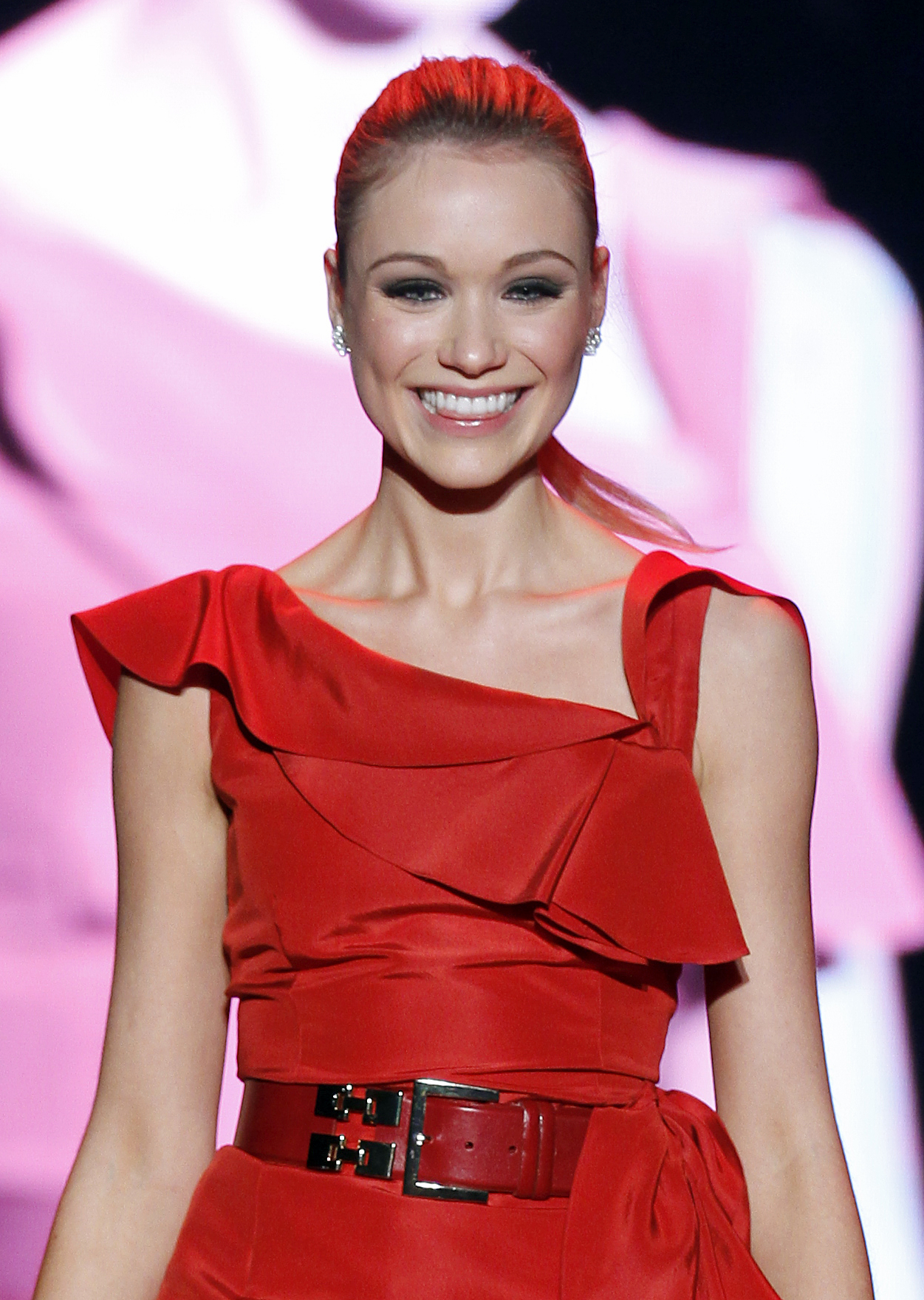
Katrina Bowden portrays Cerie.

Cerie (Katrina Bowden) is Liz's young, beautiful, laid-back assistant. Cerie is named after an actual person who was Lorne Michaels’ assistant at SNL. The heiress of the Xerox family, her surname is revealed to also be "Xerox" in a scene cut from the broadcast version of "SeinfeldVision". She is the object of intense desire from the male writers of TGS because of her beauty and sometimes revealing clothing. As Liz's assistant, her excessive youthful naïveté causes her to often misinterpret Liz's instructions to humorous effect and frequently overestimate Liz's age. Despite her clueless demeanor, Cerie has shown great intellect on multiple occasions. She frequently receives drunken phone messages, which she states she does not think are cute, even when they are from Liz.

In "Jack the Writer", she says that, career-wise, she doesn't actually want to work in television; rather, she plans to "marry rich and design handbags." She is also in a band that has performed on Letterman. Contractually, she can only hold beautiful black babies in Benetton advertisements.

In "The Baby Show", Cerie becomes engaged to Aris, who never appears on screen, after five weeks of dating. When Liz tells Cerie that she may be rushing into marriage, Cerie replies that she would only be able to be a "young hot mom" for a limited time, and that she didn't want to be "like... 50" when her children graduate from high school. If their first child is a girl, possible names include "Bookcase", "Sandstorm", and "Hat", though Cerie thinks "Hat" is "more of a boy's name". In "Up All Night", it is mentioned that Cerie and Aris were fighting because he wants a Greek Orthodox wedding but she disagrees with the Church's stance on Cyprus; soon after, he is kidnapped by Somali pirates while on his father's yacht. Aris returns three seasons later, apparently "thanks to the A-team." Cerie notes that he is quieter upon his return, has a different energy, and is recovering from Stockholm Syndrome. Cerie and Aris finally marry three seasons later in "I Do Do". Liz and Jenna serve as Cerie's bridesmaids, along with Andy Roddick's wife, Cerie's Dutch cousins, and Penelope Cruz's hotter sister Monica. Aris's groomsmen include several Somali pirates.

In "Secret Santa", Cerie tells Jack Donaghy and Liz Lemon that her mother was born in 1976. This probably means that Cerie's mother was a teen mom when Cerie was born. However, in a previous episode, Cerie said that her mother is 38 years old.

Cerie states in "A Goon's Deed in a Weary World" that she quit years earlier, but inexplicably kept coming to work. She joins the rest of the TGS crew and cast on-stage, to resign personally to the Kabletown board of directors, to prevent the show from being recommissioned and thus enable Liz to devote her time to her newly adopted children. She sticks around to pack up the TGS writers' room, and orders both the writers' would-be last lunch which Liz dictates, and its replacement decreed by Lutz. ("Hogcock!", "Last Lunch")

=== Toofer Spurlock ===
James "Toofer" Spurlock (Keith Powell) is a proud African-American Harvard University alumnus, Harvard Krokodiloes alumnus, and TGS writer, who often disagrees with Tracy and Frank (although he and Frank often socialize with Lutz). He detests the stereotypical aspects of black culture he believes are embodied by Tracy Jordan, and he serves as a foil to Tracy, who (like the majority of the TGS staff) finds him pretentious. According to Liz, Toofer is "afraid of black people" and he is disappointed when he is set up on a date with a black woman. Despite this, he claims tremendous pride in his black heritage and identity, showing off a photo of an ancestor who was an officer in the Civil War; later, he discovers the man actually fought for the Confederacy. According to Jack, his nickname is "Toofer" because "with him you get a two-for-one; he's a black guy and a Harvard guy". Frank (with whom he shares an office) called him a "black nerd" à la Steve Urkel. It was revealed in "Lee Marvin vs. Derek Jeter" that Toofer was only hired because of affirmative action; he quits in anger, before he agrees to return. He insisted that to return, his fellow writers must stop calling him Toofer, but he relented when they suggested worse nicknames. Pete's suggestion of "Threefer, because you're also gay", is the first time that Toofer's sexuality is officially called into question, though Liz had previously insulted him, saying "Look, it's Sherlock Homo here to solve the case of the gay sweater." Toofer also agrees that he can get the group through "black-, gay-, and nerd-controlled areas". However, in some episodes, like "The Pilot", "TGS Hates Women", "Anna Howard Shaw Day", and "Up All Night", Toofer has shown an attraction to women. The character's name was inspired by series writer Robert Carlock.

=== Josh Girard ===
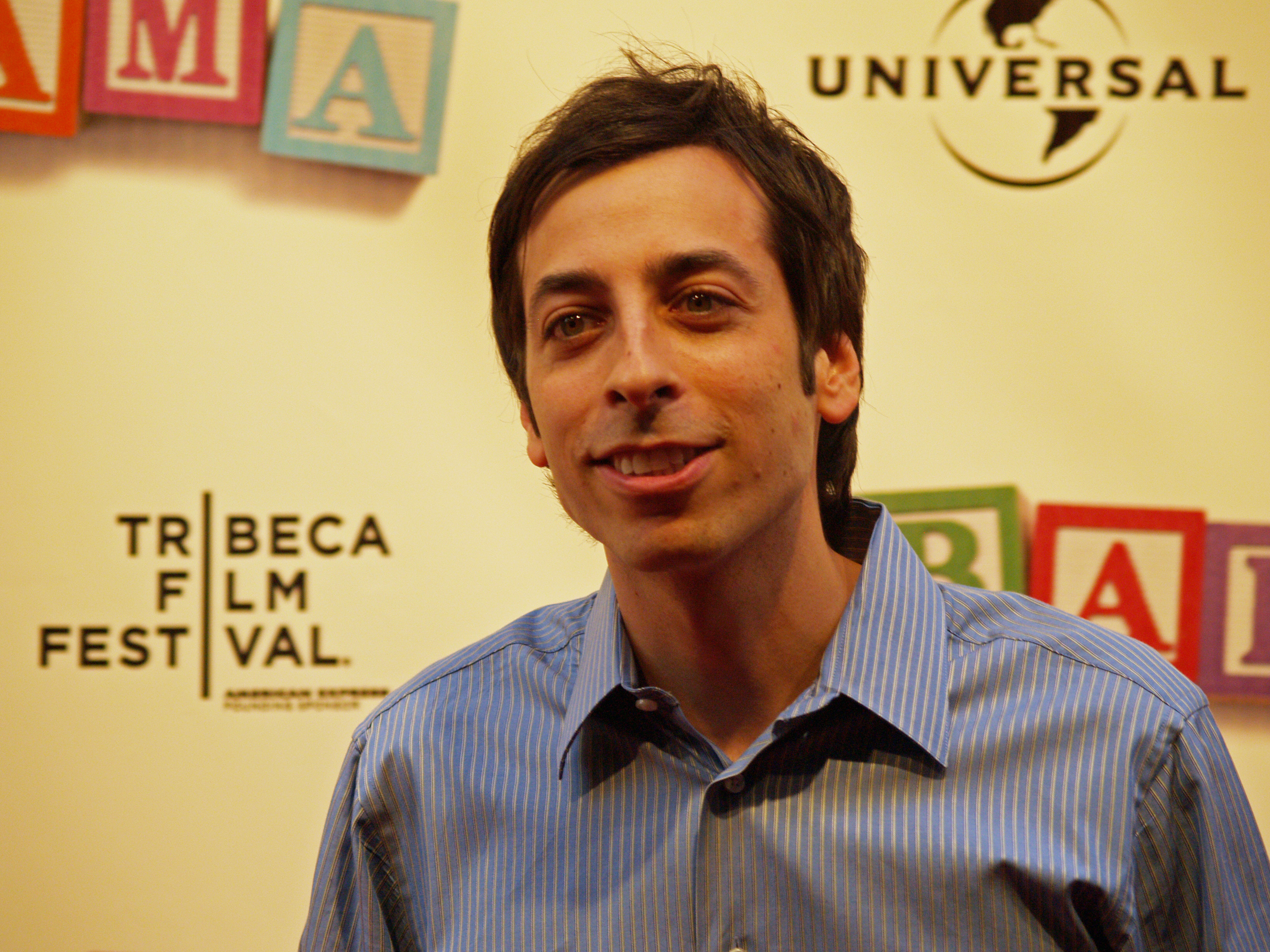
Lonny Ross as Josh Girard

Josh Girard (Lonny Ross) was the male star of TGS before Tracy was hired. Liz found him while he was opening for a puppet. He, Tracy, and Jenna Maroney are the three main actors on the show-within-a-show from Seasons 1 through 3. His character has been compared to SNL alumnus Jimmy Fallon. Josh is frequently seen in the writer's room, and appears to be the only member of the TGS cast who also works as a writer for the show. Often referred to as being a "kid", Josh is described in dialogue in a way that implies he is young, guileless, and unintelligent. He is indeed typically portrayed as lacking smarts and is often shown doing things that are considered juvenile.

Most of Josh's work on the show seems to be as an impressionist; he has performed impressions of Ray Romano, Michael Jackson, Stone Phillips, Jay Leno, Elizabeth Taylor, George W. Bush, Christopher Walken and Jerry Seinfeld.

His impressions have raised eyebrows from people who are not impressed, like Elizabeth Taylor (played by Rachel Dratch), who knocked him out with an extinguisher and leaving him severely concussed after he did a sketch that offended her in which he impersonated the actress. Original characters that he plays on the show include "Dr. Ridiculous", a Chinese man named Mr. Wang, and Gaybraham Lincoln. In "The Baby Show", Tracy got mad at Josh for impersonating him, claiming that Josh was turning him into a caricature. In "Hard Ball", it is implied that Josh is Jewish, and in a carry-over during "Ludachristmas", from the "Secret Rodney" ads that were running, Kenneth says "Merry Jewish" to Josh when passing out gifts. He, Frank, and Toofer are often observed fooling around and admiring Cerie.

In the episode "The Break-Up", Josh states that his parents raised him as a girl for 10 years. Jack Donaghy mentions in the show's second episode that Josh had a 760 SAT score and graduated from SUNY Cortland. In "Hard Ball", Josh's agent Alan Steiner is introduced. In sharp contrast to Josh, Steiner was portrayed as slick and cunning. Steiner uses unnecessary abbreviations and has a "really bad sex addiction."

In "The Rural Juror", Josh sneaked into Liz's office to get her copy of The Rural Juror and quickly dislikes it upon seeing the title ("Well, this is disappointing...I had to let Tony [the security guard] watch me pee to get that tape"). He does not appear in season three until the 13th episode, "Goodbye, My Friend".

In "Season 4", Josh becomes frustrated with everyone's poor treatment of him and quits TGS. He then winds up auditioning again in "Audition Day", but he is rejected; Danny Baker replaces him in the main TGS cast. Lonny Ross was written out of the series in season four. He appears via a flashback to a raunchy TGS sketch with Tracy in the series finale.

=== Dot Com ===
Walter "Dot Com" Slattery (Kevin Brown) is a member of Tracy's entourage. Another recurring character during the first two seasons, he is also credited as a series regular during seasons three and four. Dot Com is Tracy's driver and cook; in "Hard Ball", his and Grizz's last names are revealed. Dot Com is erudite and intellectual; he is a 1993 graduate of Wesleyan University, aspires to screenwriting, speaks fluent French, and hints at successful entrepreneurial ventures. He credits a former campaign of his for a city council seat as having "raised the level of discourse in this city", even though he lost the election. Dot Com once portrayed Boris Alexeyevich Trigorin in Anton Chekhov's The Seagull, a role which Tracy praised, saying he saw Walter "become" Trigorin. Dot Com and Grizz are old friends, having met at a "summer camp for giants" ("Argus"). Like Tracy, Walter grew up in the South Bronx, though without experiencing poverty ("I wanted for nothing as a child, but that brings its own challenges", he notes, with Tracy responding "Shut up, Dot Com!"). Dot Com often serves as the voice of sanity within the series, and finds himself ignored with mounting frustration. During seasons 3 and 4, it is revealed that he is in love with Grizz's fiancée, Feyoncé, with whom he is implied to have had an affair.

With the cancellation of TGS, Dot Com develops Grizz's sitcom, Grizz & Herz. He is soon joined behind the camera by Liz Lemon ("Last Lunch").

=== Grizz ===
Warren "Grizz" Griswold (Grizz Chapman) is another member of Tracy's entourage. A recurring character during the first two seasons, he is credited as a series regular in seasons three and four. Grizz is the most physically imposing member of Tracy's entourage and the cast; referencing their long friendship in "Argus", Tracy tells him "I've known you since you were six feet tall!" Within the entourage, Grizz is charged with "sitting on" Tracy when he is overstimulated, in addition to a very fluid list of other responsibilities. In "Kidney Now!" it is revealed that Tracy and Grizz attended high school together. Grizz was apparently Tracy's financial manager, and he blames Worldcom for Tracy's financial problems that led to him joining the cast; in season 5 he was suggested to be Tracy and Adam West's talent manager. Despite his calm demeanor, Grizz is shown to be a romantic and deeply emotional man. "Sexual history" between Grizz and Liz Lemon (whom he alone addresses as 'Beth') is referred to in several episodes. A drunken Liz came onto him at Kenneth's party in "Greenzo", which traumatised him. Despite their history, he cajoles her into serving as his "woman of honor" (i.e., female best man) in his wedding to his fiancée, Feyoncé.

Grizz reads George R. R. Martin's A Song of Ice and Fire and expressed shock at a climactic moment toward the end of A Game of Thrones.

With the cancellation of TGS, Grizz remains at NBC. He is cast as the lead in a fish-out-of-water situation comedy developed by Dot Com, Grizz & Herz, in which his character runs an inn in Santa Fe, New Mexico. Liz eventually follows the duo, taking a behind-the-camera position and occasionally bringing her adopted children to work. ("Last Lunch")

=== Jonathan ===
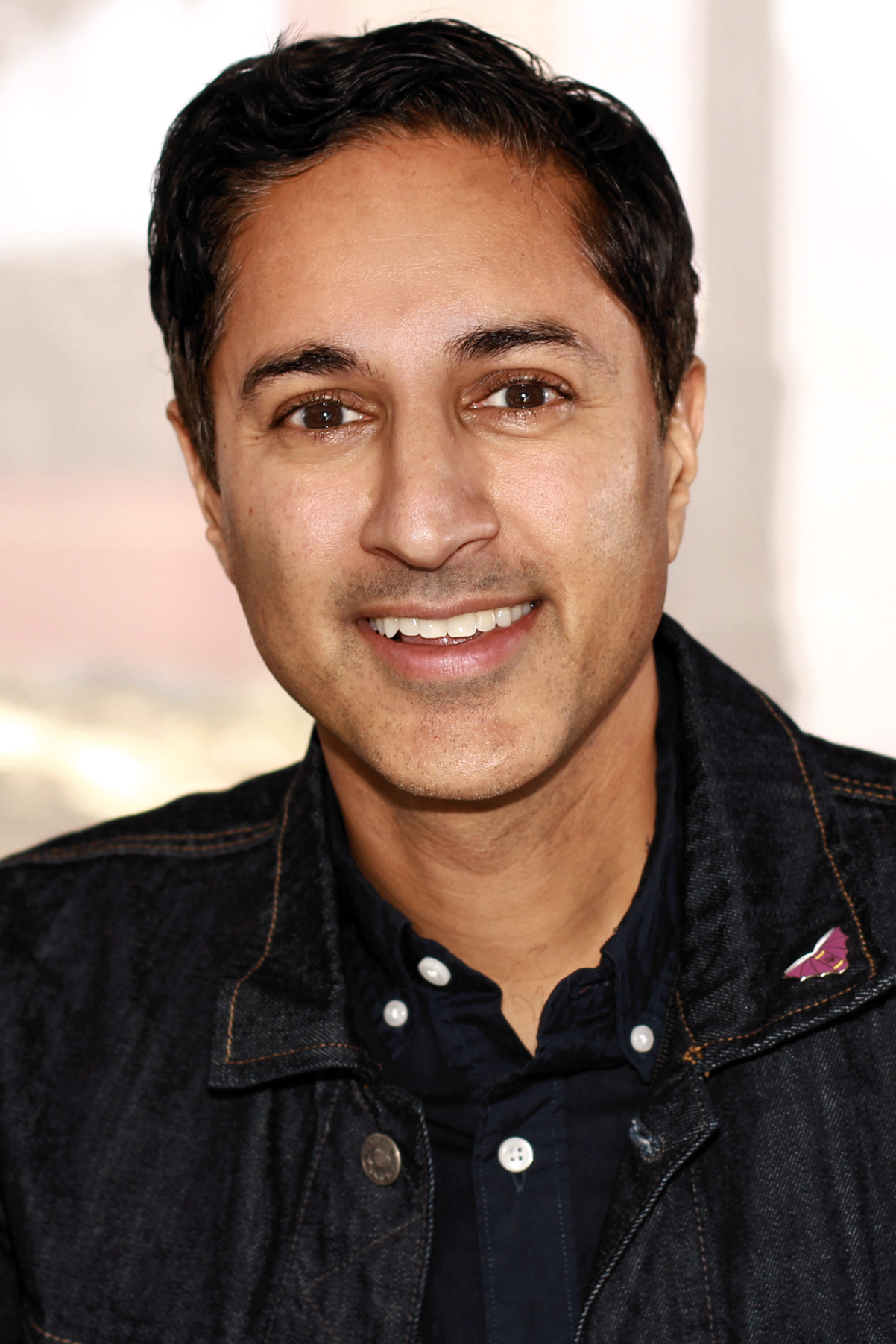
Maulik Pancholy portrays Jonathan, Jack's assistant

Jonathan (Maulik Pancholy) is Jack's assistant. Jonathan harbours a desperate crush on Jack. His obsessive admiration of his boss is coupled with disdain towards Liz, whom he considers unworthy of Jack's attention. In the episode "Believe in the Stars", Jack reveals he only hired him because he was heavily medicated on Comanaprosil and he mistook Jonathan for M. Night Shyamalan. In season 4, episode 11 ("Winter Madness") it is revealed that Jonathan is of Indian descent, and in episode 18 ("Khonani") he addresses the janitor Khonani in Hindi. Elsewhere, he mentions meeting his "birth parents", revealing he is adopted, and when in the season-five episode "Let's Stay Together", when Jack asks Jonathan to provide a distraction by pretending to be a stereotypical Indian and faking an Indian accent, Jonathan objects, "But I'm from Palo Alto!" Jonathan has repeatedly made highly racist comments about people from Indian Kashmir ("Khonani", verbally assaulting a Kashmiri janitor, and even hoping for a natural disaster to devastate them, asking for divine intervention that would "strike them from the sky". "Operation Righteous Cowboy Lightning").

As a Christmas gift one year, Jack secured the release of Jonathan's sister from a North Korean prison. Jack's wife Avery was later kidnapped to North Korea herself. Liz once caught Jonathan wearing a wedding dress and dancing with one of Jack's suits. ("Hogcock!")

Jonathan retains his position when Jack is replaced by Kathy Geiss, and is heartbroken by Jack's departure. He stays on as Jack's assistant when Jack is reinstated and keeps the same office despite Jack's promotion to chairman of NBC. Jack fires Jonathan in "Cutbacks", but he reappears as Jack's assistant three episodes later without explanation. He relocates with Jack to a suite upstairs when the latter is appointed chairman of Kabletown and eschews the company's Philadelphia headquarters in favor of remaining in the G.E. Building. ("Hogcock!" / "Last Lunch")

Jonathan is off-camera throughout the show's sixth season, something that the characters appear not to notice. His disappearance was due to actor Pancholy's co-starring role on another NBC sitcom, Whitney. Pancholy exists within the 30 Rock universe independently of Jonathan, being mentioned by Jack in "The Ballad of Kenneth Parcell" during that period; Alec Baldwin likewise exists independently of Jack who mentions the actor in "Hogcock!" Jonathan returns in season seven, stating that he was away looking after his sick grandmother. ("The Beginning of the End")

=== Lutz ===
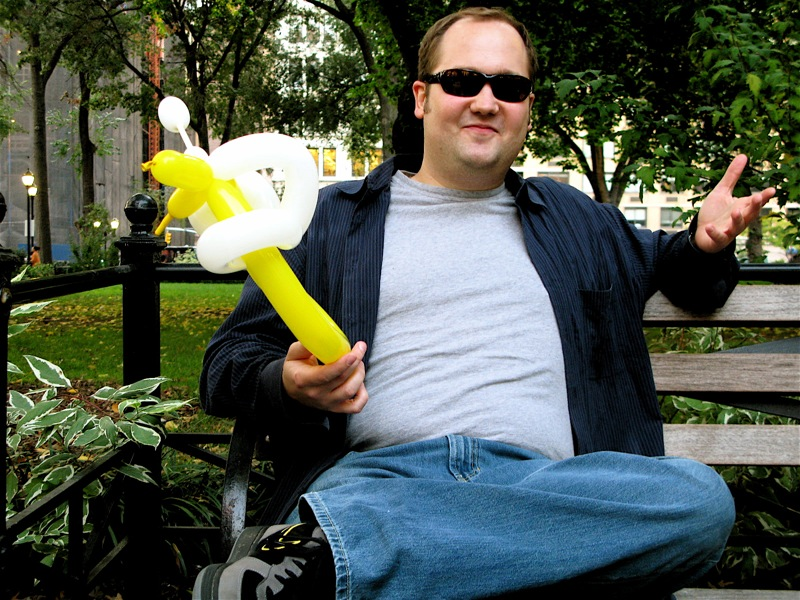
John Lutz portrays Lutz

Johnny "J. D." Lutz (John Lutz) is a lazy TGS writer who is often ridiculed by the rest of the staff. When characters enter the room they sometimes yell, "Shut up, Lutz!" even if Lutz was not speaking at the time. The other characters are unconcerned about his well-being; when Lutz ran headfirst into a wall in "The Ones", no one helped him until a wall-mounted television fell on him, and even then, Pete (the producer) tells the writers, who instigated the incident, "I hope you've learned your lesson. Because of what you did, we almost lost a monitor." Lutz is originally from Alaska (which he hates), and claims to be part Inuit. His first two initials were mentioned in "The Aftermath", in which it was also revealed that he has a thyroid problem. The J is revealed to stand for Johnny (or John) in "The Moms". He attended Oberlin College; after his junior year, he traveled to South by Southwest (a film, interactive, and music festival in Austin, Texas). The show implies that he is a gay man in the process of coming out, although everyone ignores (or forgets) this due to their dislike of him. Lutz periodically mentions a girlfriend who lives in Canada, named Karen. No one believes him; therefore, Lutz created a website (JDLutz.com/karen/proof—an actual page on the 30 Rock website). He finally identifies himself as bisexual while shouting at his fellow writers on their last day of work in "Last Lunch". It is also mentioned during season six that Kellan Lutz from the Twilight series is his grandnephew, and while everyone thinks this is another one of his lies, Kellan actually does show up in Season 7 to hang out with his relative (and to try and tape a pro-Obama skit for TGS). In the series finale, Lutz finally takes revenge on the writing staff after seven years of ridicule by insisting that their final free lunch will be ordered from Blimpies, going to absurd lengths to ensure his victory, including legally changing his name to Johnny Aardvark so he will be first alphabetically. Lutz's mother is portrayed by John Lutz in drag in "The Moms"; however, this may just be the character Lutz impersonating his own mother, since they are not seen together.

== Recurring GE/NBC/Kabletown employees ==
=== Danny Baker ===
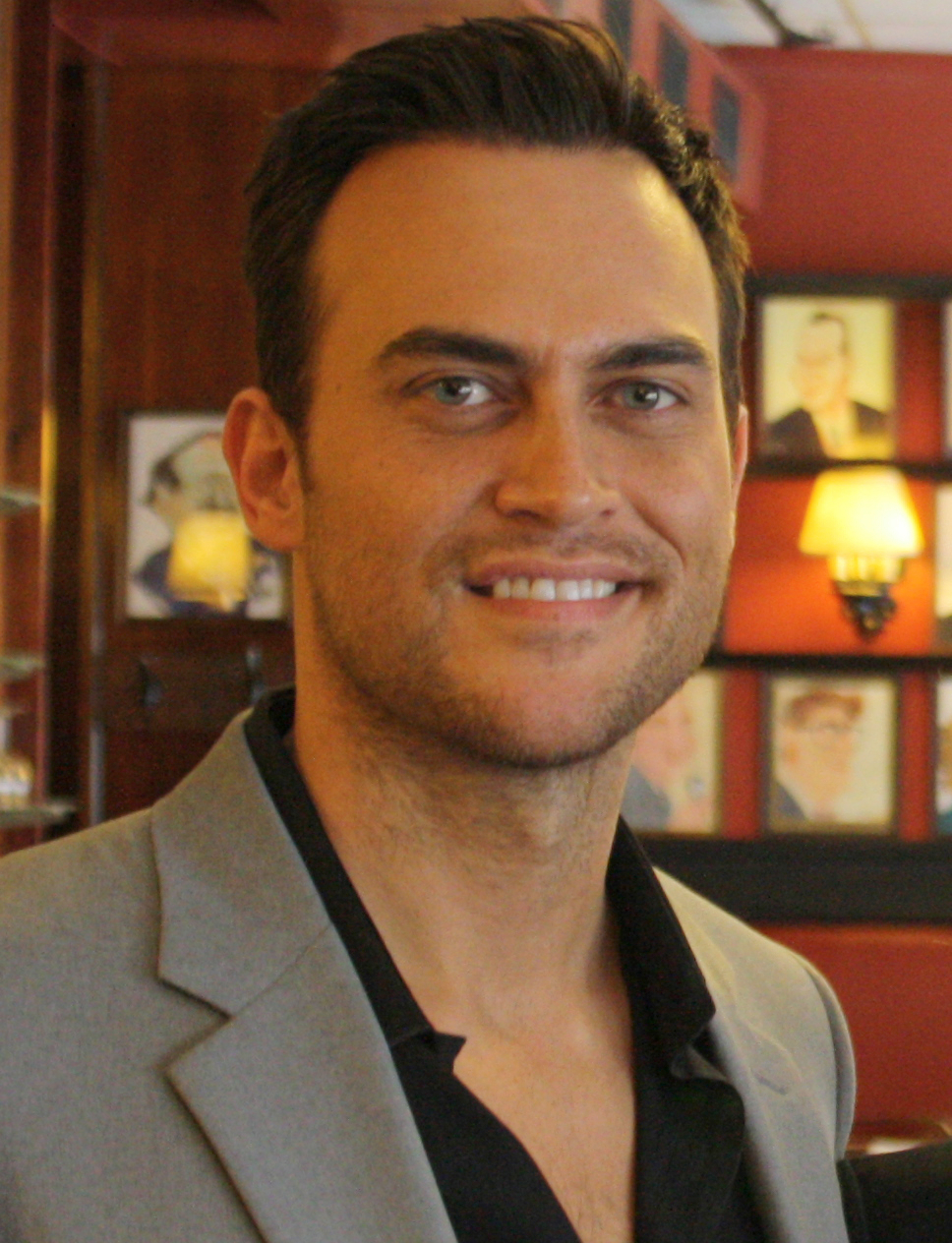
Cheyenne Jackson portrays Danny Baker

Jack "Danny" Baker (Cheyenne Jackson) is hired as a new TGS cast member in the fourth season. Danny is originally from Ottawa, and after starring in a movie about Canadian football, came to New York and became a robotic street performer. He first appears in the episode "Audition Day" (played by actor/dancer Daniel Genalo). On his first day of work (without his silver clothes and makeup), Jack Donaghy renames him "Danny" rather than to have two Jacks. Later that day, he accurately speculates to an incredulous Tracy and Jenna that Kenneth could be running the network in the future.

Danny had a brief fling with his boss, Liz Lemon, which annoyed Jack. Ironically, it was Jack's example that inspired Liz to "take her reward" with her employee in the first place. Assuming that Danny's real name of Jack is a diminutive of Jon or John, he is in keeping with Liz's tendency to date men who share names with celebrities and fictional characters: Jon Baker, the CHiPs character portrayed by Liz's childhood crush, Larry Wilcox. Indeed, Danny was even in-costume as Wilcox/Baker during one of their assignations. Jack persuaded Danny to end the affair by telling Danny that he (Jack) was in love with Liz.

Danny is earnest, good-natured, and a talented singer. He defers to Jenna when his singing talent makes her jealous, to the point of deliberately singing badly during a Christmas special so she can step in and shine. He mentions that he has a hard time recognizing sarcasm because "Canada has a small Jewish population", and was shocked to discover he was adopted despite his mother being Japanese. Danny doesn't appear in much of the sixth season until he returns in the episode "Live from Studio 6H", in which he reveals that he has been locked in a prison in Singapore due to the discovery of a suspicious package he was possessing, which happened to have been given to him by Jenna. He makes his final appearance in "There's No I in America", when he asks Liz to help him from being deported back to Canada, but Liz ignores his problem.

Appears in: "The Problem Solvers", "Secret Santa", "Black Light Attack!", "Winter Madness", "Floyd", "The Moms", "Live Show", "Mrs. Donaghy", "100", "Live from Studio 6H", "There's No I in America"

=== Don Geiss ===
Don Geiss (/ˈɡaɪs/ GHYSSE; Rip Torn) is CEO of General Electric (GE) on the show, and Jack's boss. Jack considers Geiss his mentor, and idolizes him. Geiss has a mentally challenged daughter (Kathy), an effeminate son (Bertram, 'Daddy's Fancy Boy'), a secret second family in Canada (a reference to Torn's role in Eulogy) and a third (secret) attic family. In "Future Husband" Geiss dies, but (real-world) former GE chairman Jack Welch keeps his death a secret while GE negotiates a takeover with the (fictional) Philadelphia-based cable company Kabletown (which is based on Comcast). Geiss is cryogenically frozen in carbonite in an Episcopal service.

Appears in: "The C Word", "Corporate Crush", "Jack Gets in the Game", "Succession", "Sandwich Day", "Reunion", "Larry King"

=== Kathy Geiss ===
Kathy Geiss (Marceline Hugot) is Don Geiss' daughter. She is a strange middle-aged woman and appears to suffer from rosacea. Kathy likes unicorns, Mark Wahlberg and soap operas. She may possibly be neurodivergent, sometimes harms herself and is oblivious to fiancé Devon Banks' homosexuality and contempt for her. She has been seen putting pocket watches and toy race cars in her mouth and eating flowers. She rarely speaks, occasionally saying single words (such as "kiss kiss kiss" in "Do-Over"), but is a highly gifted singer and musician, once performing a beautiful rendition of "I Dreamed a Dream", in a send-up of the Susan Boyle performance. She later performed "Ave Maria" (Note: It is unclear as to which version of "Ave Maria" this was, but the best-known ones are those by Bach/Gounod and by Schubert.) as a trumpet solo. When her father was in a coma, Kathy held the titles of chairman and CEO of GE and President of East Coast Television and Microwave Oven Programming. In truth, Kathy was only a figurehead, while her fiancé, Devon Banks, ran the company from behind the scenes. Her appearance in "Idiots Are People Three!" suggests that she has taken over GE after her father's death. Also in "Idiots Are People Three!", it is revealed that she has invented a "calming box" specifically for elderly people. She later agrees with Jack and Devon to give money to a hospital in exchange that NBC's new mascot be "Majellica the Unicorn". Her invention of the hug machine (to hug the elderly) is then revealed to be defective, and it's implied an old woman was crushed to death.

Appears in: "Jack Gets in the Game", "Succession", "Sandwich Day", "Do-Over", "Reunion", "Audition Day", "Don Geiss, America and Hope", "Argus", "Idiots Are People Three!", "Hogcock!"

=== Devon Banks ===
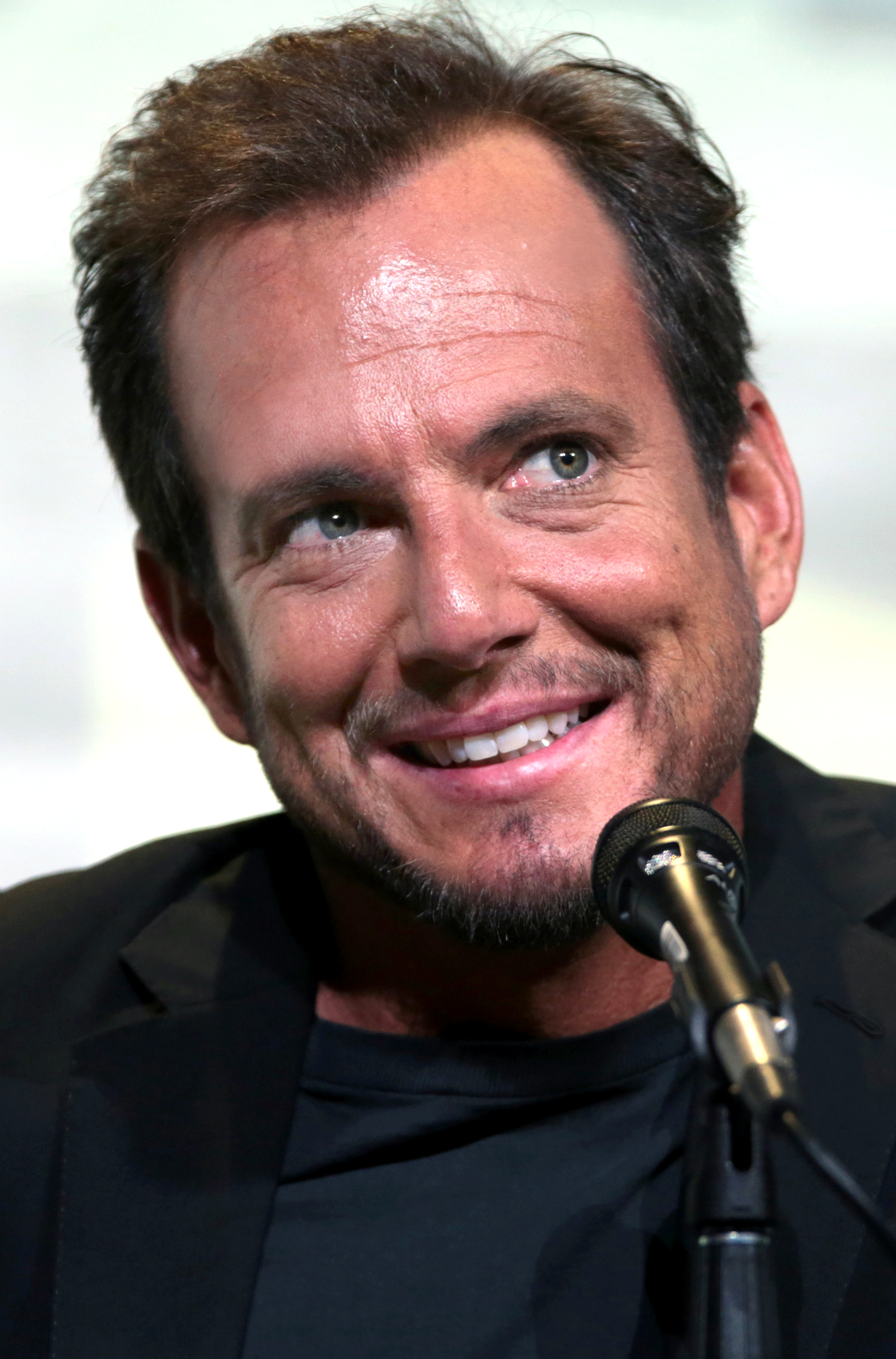
Will Arnett as Devon Banks

Devon Banks (Will Arnett) is the former Vice President of West Coast News, Web Content, and Theme Park Talent Relations for NBC, and Jack Donaghy's primary nemesis. In a 2008 interview with Fortune magazine, Tina Fey said that Banks' character was based on former co-chairman of NBC Entertainment Ben Silverman. Devon is the nemesis of the (older) Jack Donaghy; he is first seen in "Fireworks", when his surprise visit from Los Angeles leads Jack to believe that he is trying to take Jack's job as Vice President of East Coast Television and Microwave Oven Programming. Devon is gay, but for a point, was closeted as he becomes engaged to Kathy Geiss to get ahead in the company. Devon lusts after Kenneth Parcell and uses his status as a former NBC page himself to ingratiate himself with Kenneth. Jack, however, uses Kenneth as a honey trap to spy on and distract Devon. After the events of "Do-Over", he leaves Kathy and winds up showing up again in "Into the Crevasse" working for the Obama administration, and attempts to make Jack take government bail-out money, which Jack eventually does with reluctance. He appears again in Season 5's "Plan B", married and the father of three "gaybies", whom he and his partner Cashmere had via a surrogate mother. He briefly attempts to compete with Jack for the CEO position of Kabletown, but learns to treasure family more, and officially admits defeat to Jack. He returns in "Idiots Are People Three!" and manipulates Jack into using his connections to get his children into an elite preschool, but his joy that Jack won't be able to do that for his own daughter vanishes as Jack smugly notes that Liddy is already brilliant and doesn't need any outside help. Banks appears again in Season 7's "Game Over" as part of Kaylie Hooper's ploy to wrangle control of Kabletown away from Jack.

Appears in: "Fireworks", "Jack Gets in the Game", "Succession", "Do-Over", "Into the Crevasse", "Dealbreakers Talk Show #0001", "Plan B", "Idiots Are People Three!", "Game Over"

=== Hank Hooper ===
Hank Hooper (Ken Howard), an all-American family man and Vietnam War veteran, is head of Kabletown. He is often angered by Jack's handling of TGS, but paradoxically always seems happy on the surface (laughing incessantly, while directing thinly veiled insults and threats to Jack and his staff). After his own children were ruined by trust fund syndrome, he expected to be succeeded by his granddaughter, Kaylie Hooper, who quickly becomes Jack's new rival.

He is loosely based on the similarly alliteratively named founder of Comcast, Ralph J. Roberts; Comcast is sometimes said to be run as a "family business.".

Appears in: "¡Qué Sorpresa!", "Plan B", "100", "The Ballad of Kenneth Parcell", "Standards and Practices", "The Shower Principle", "Game Over", "Florida".

=== Subhas ===
Subhas (Subhas Ramsaywack) is the head janitor at 30 Rockefeller Plaza. He is an Indian immigrant and is married to Ann Curry. Subhas is central to the plot in the Season 4 episode "Khonani" parodying the feud between late-night television hosts Conan O'Brien (who appeared on two 30 Rock episodes) and Jay Leno. In 2005, Jack Donaghy had signed a contract with Subhas' rival Indian janitor, Khonani, to take over the 11:30 p.m. janitorial shift from Subhas in five years' time. In "Khonani", it's 2010 and Jack informs Subhas the deal is taking effect. After Subhas objects, Jack agrees to move him to 10:00 pm. Khonani however then protests to Jack that there is no trash for him to pick up at 11:30 because Subhas has already collected it. Ultimately, Subhas returns to 11:30 and Khonani leaves NBC for "Fox [cough] -woods ... Foxwoods Resort Casino" (as it was predicted O'Brien would take his show to Fox before ultimately moving to TBS).

The actor Subhas Ramsaywack was actually a night janitor for thirty years at the Silvercup studios where 30 Rock was filmed and the writers, who often worked late into the night, were inspired to include the real Subhas as a fictional version of himself.

Appears in: "Into the Crevasse", "Secret Santa", "Khonani", "Gentleman's Intermission", "¡Qué Sorpresa!", "TGS Hates Women", "I Heart Connecticut", "100", "Idiots Are People Two!", "Idiots Are People Three!", "Kidnapped by Danger", "Florida", "A Goon's Deed in a Weary World".

=== Kaylie Hooper ===
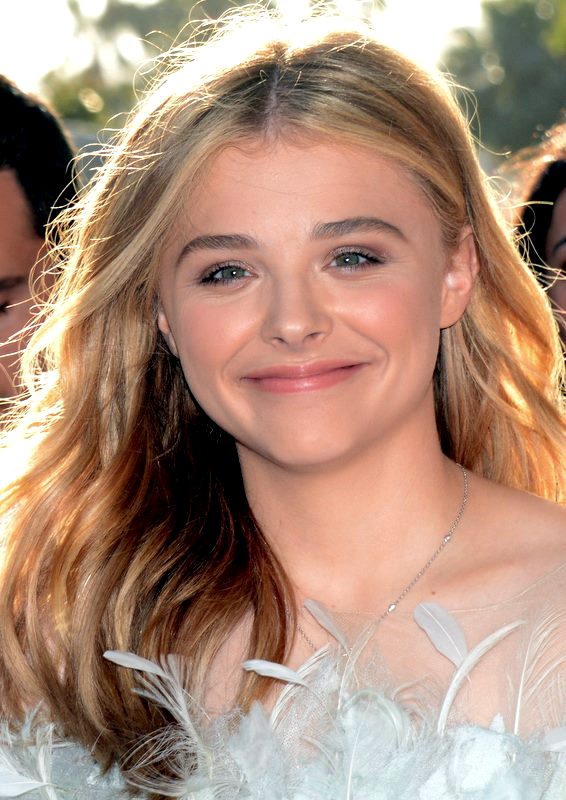
Chloë Grace Moretz portrays Kaylie Hooper

Kaylie Hooper (Chloë Grace Moretz) is the granddaughter of Hank Hooper, who is in competition with Jack to take over her grandfather's role as CEO of Kabletown. First introduced in "TGS Hates Women", she has twice used typical teenage girl antics to try to cover up her schemes to bring down Jack. Initially, she pretended to be interested in oceanography and later threatened to destroy Jack if he interfered with her future at Kabletown. Later on, she deliberately sabotaged an NBC reality show with singing kids as part of a convoluted plot to make sure Jack got her expelled from a private school she hated, thus landing her a spot at a school in Manhattan near her NYU student boyfriend—but Jack got the last laugh, as he ruined her dreams of playing lacrosse there, and thus she couldn't pretend he hadn't won that round. Kaylie returns in "Game Over", still wanting to be CEO of Kabletown. In this episode, it is apparently revealed to Jack that she is not Hank's granddaughter, and Jack plans to expose her. In reality, she is Hank's granddaughter, but she deliberately set up Jack to have him send someone else's DNA to Hank, believing it was hers, using Devon as a pawn in her plan. However, Jack reveals he never sent Hank the DNA results, but instead a birthday card, knowing Hank is passionate about birthdays. Because of Jack's distractions throughout the week, Kaylie neglected to observe Hank's birthday, sealing Jack's fate as Kabletown CEO and Kaylie's ultimate downfall.

Appears in: "TGS Hates Women", "Standards and Practices", "Game Over".

=== Howard Jorgensen ===
Howard Jorgensen (Brian Stack) is Vice President of Locomotives at GE and a member of the board of directors. A former protégé of Jack's, he is married to a Filipina, has two children and owns a house with a pool. Jack has stated that people use Jorgensen as a scapegoat.

Appears in: "Jack Meets Dennis", "Succession", "Larry King"

=== Donny Lawson ===
Donny Lawson (Paul Scheer) is the head page at 30 Rockefeller Plaza, known for his weak one-liners and bizarre hand gestures. He despises Kenneth for his cheerfulness, and wants to transfer him to the CNBC studios in Paramus. Donny was introduced on the series when Jenna tries to find a replacement jacket for Kenneth; Donny uses this as an excuse to give Kenneth a demerit. He challenges him to a "page-off" (a strange contest, mixing physical stamina with NBC trivia) which is quickly broken up by Pete, who orders Donny to give Kenneth a new jacket.

Appears in: "Rosemary's Baby", "Cooter"

=== Jeffrey Weinerslav ===
Jeffrey Weinerslav (Todd Buonopane) (pronounced "weener-slave") works for GE human resources. He tried to mediate a dispute between Jenna and Tracy, but failed. Weinerslav is a self-described "overweight transgender". He counseled Liz during her forced leave for sexual harassment (which she attempted to extend by making a pass at him). He later counsels Jack and Liz when they briefly get married due to a clerical error.

Appears in: "Believe in the Stars", "Cutbacks", "Jackie Jormp-Jomp", "Let's Stay Together", "Mrs. Donaghy"

=== Hazel Wassername ===
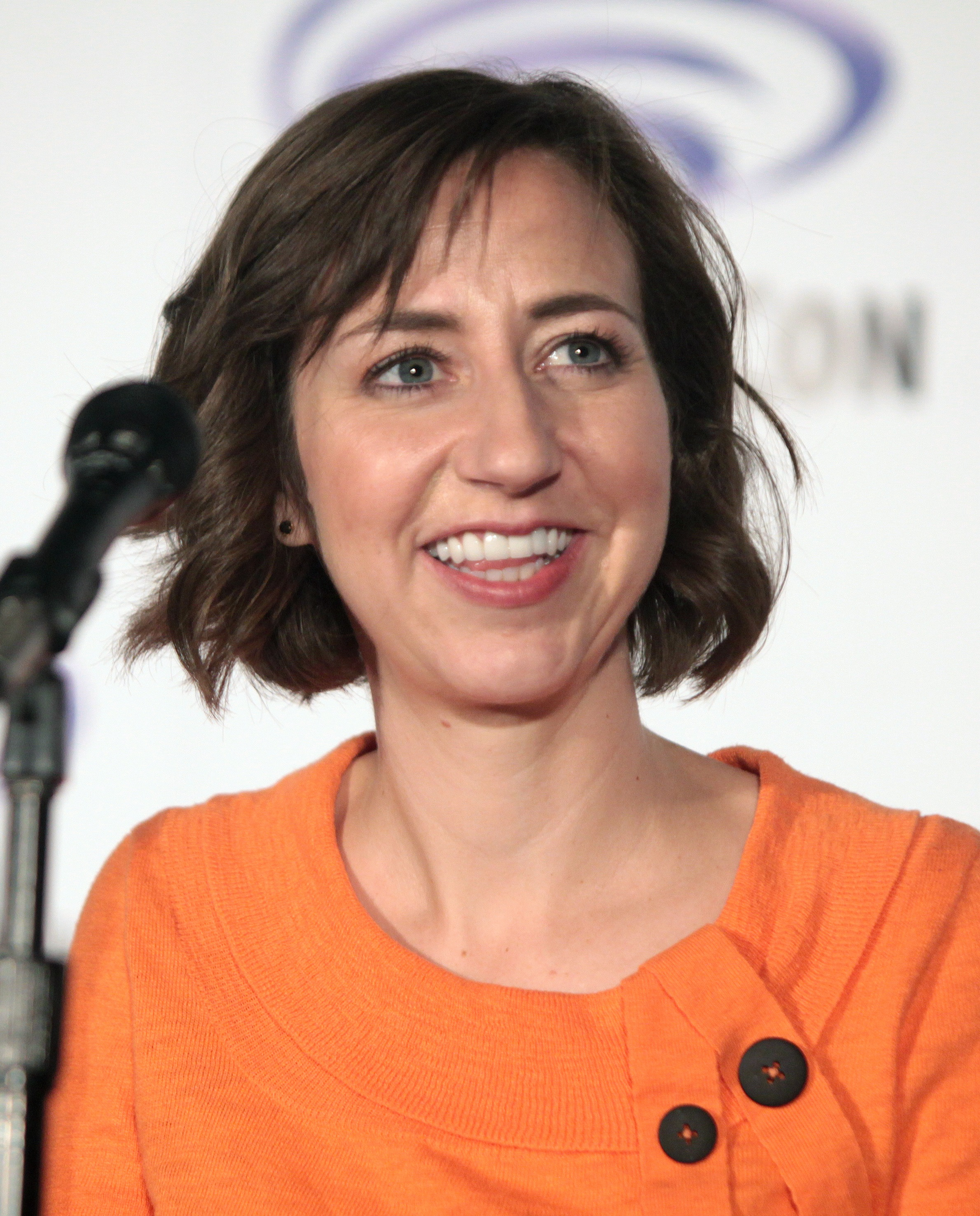
Kristen Schaal portrays Hazel Wassername

Hazel Wassername, aka Richard Drench (Kristen Schaal) replaces Kenneth Parcell as an NBC page when he is promoted to Standards and Practice in season six. At first, she stalked Liz and deeply despised Jenna, having nearly succeeded in her efforts to maim or kill her and therefore become Liz's "best friend". In "What Will Happen to the Gang Next Year?" it is revealed that she sees Kenneth as a threat, and rewrites his reapplication to the page program in a way that causes him to not receive the job. She also moves in with him in the same episode, and while her claim that she's "in love" with him appears to be false, she is the only woman he has ever been seen kissing on the show. She previously had a relationship with a pimp named Razmig, and has some disturbing sexual notions. She is a recurring character, beginning in season six. In "St. Patrick's Day", she reveals that she left her kids in a Sears in 2004 and has an IQ of 70, though considering her penchant for lying and exaggeration, it is possible that these claims are both false. She was later fired by Liz for attempting to trick Pete into letting her perform on TGS. Before leaving, she reveals that Hazel Wassername is not her real name. Following her departure, Hazel breaks up with Kenneth. In "My Whole Life Is Thunder", Hazel is "recast" by Tracy as a young Asian woman (Shannon Tyo) in an attempt to cheer Kenneth up.

After leaving NBC, Wassername sues parent company Kabletown alleging to have been the victim of sexual harassment in "Florida". Although her claims make her look worse than any of her co-workers, she accurately recounts how badly everyone treats Kenneth; when Jenna and Tracy tell him to be honest, he confirms those incidents (though he isn't that upset about them) and the bad publicity leads Hank Hooper to finally cancel TGS.

Appears in: "Today You Are a Man", "Hey, Baby, What's Wrong", "St. Patrick's Day", "Grandmentor", "The Shower Principle", "Live from Studio 6H", "What Will Happen to the Gang Next Year?", "The Beginning of the End", "Aunt Phatso vs. Jack Donaghy", "Florida".

=== Greta Johansen ===
Legreta "Greta" Johansen (Rachel Dratch) is a cat wrangler who works on the show. In "The Baby Show" she offered to carry the child whom Liz wants, and revealed that she owns a small ferret farm 60 miles (97 km) north of New York City. Greta hints at an obsession with Liz, mentioning that she likes to watch Liz watching TV. Appears in: "Pilot", "The Baby Show", "The C Word", "100".

Dratch, who was featured as Jenna in the original pilot of the show but recast, has also played several minor characters, predominantly in season 1, including Barbara Walters ("The Rural Juror"), Elizabeth Taylor ("Jack Meets Dennis"), a Latina maid ("The Aftermath"), a drunken Russian prostitute ("Up All Night"), Liz's doctor ("Hiatus"), a protestor ("Hard Ball"), a group therapist ("The Break-Up"), the Happy Days-obsessed janitor, Jadwiga, in the season-five episode "Live Show", the voice of an NBC-trivia spouting computer called Not Kenneth ("The Ballad of Kenneth Parcell"), and a "little blue dude" seen in hallucinations in "Tracy Does Conan" and "100."

=== Sue LaRoche-Van der Hout ===
Susannah "Sue" LaRoche-Van der Hout (Sue Galloway), also referred to as "girl-writer", is a TGS writer, who speaks with a heavy French-Dutch accent. The CBS dramatic series, The Mentalist, is a remake of a Dutch programme, Van der Hoot: Psychische (De Mentalist), which was based upon Sue's work as a police psychic in the Netherlands. Following the cancellation of TGS With Tracy Jordan, she takes a serving position at Hooters despite being heavily pregnant; she is called back for the final TGS episode.

Sue has a pragmatic personality, but she is known for unpredictable behavior. She appears to have an affinity for pornography, and some episodes allude that she is bisexual. She apparently has a Black daughter, whom she brings to work on Take Your Black Kid to Work Day in "Sun Tea". Sue also claims that she is a virgin ("with white guys") when offering herself to Jack in "St. Patrick's Day". In "Black Light Attack", Tracy adds her to his entourage, seeking a woman's influence after he learns he is going to have a daughter. However, she leaves the entourage in anger after Tracy begins to act like an overprotective father. In "It's Never Too Late for Now", it is shown that she can become violent: when Jack hires the writers to stage a fake fight, she beats up Lutz and even breaks Toofer's arm and her own wrist.

Notable appearances: "Up All Night", "Fireworks", "Ludachristmas", "Christmas Special", "The Funcooker", "Kidney Now!", "Into the Crevasse", "Stone Mountain", "Sun Tea", "Dealbreakers Talk Show#0001", "Black Light Attack!", "Winter Madness", "I Do Do", "Live Show", "Brooklyn Without Limits", "Operation Righteous Cowboy Lightning", "It's Never Too Late for Now", "TGS Hates Women", "Plan B", "The Ballad of Kenneth Parcell", "St. Patrick's Day", "Live from Studio 6H", "Stride of Pride", "Hogcock!", "Last Lunch".

=== Gaylord Felcher ===
Gaylord Felcher (Michael Torpey) is the head of Standards and Practices at NBC. Felcher is Kenneth Parcell's boss during his time at Standards and speaks in near constant profanity punctuated with obscene gestures in the spirit of quis custodiet ipsos custodes?.

Appears in: "Standards and Practices", "Grandmentor"

== Liz's love interests ==
The following characters have (at some point during the show) been boyfriends of Liz.

=== Dennis Duffy ===
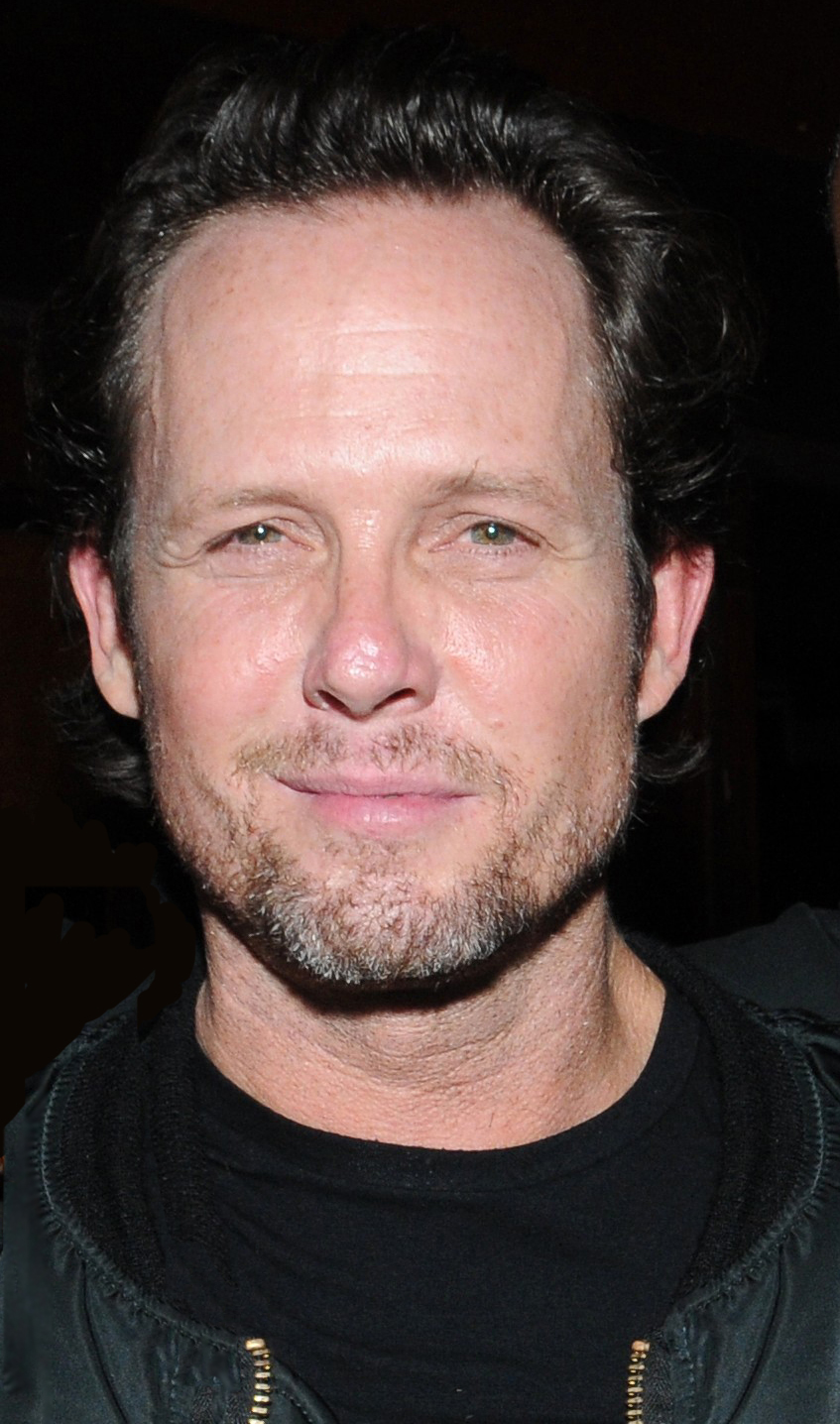
Dean Winters portrays Dennis Duffy

Dennis Duffy (Dean Winters) was Liz's boyfriend for three episodes during the early part of the show's first season; he has also made appearances in each subsequent season. Liz had a relationship with him that ended prior to the series, and she briefly resumes a relationship with him only to break it off after discovering that he has been featured on To Catch a Predator. (Dennis later claimed that he knew the girl was actually eighteen because, "She said her last boyfriend was Asian, and that crap doesn't start 'till college.") Dennis has popped up occasionally in later seasons to annoy Liz and attempt to reunite. He is generally disliked by most of the characters, most notably Liz and Jenna, the latter of whom he had sex with behind Liz's back.

Dennis claims to be the love of Liz's life, which she disputes. The few good memories she has of him are mostly food-related, but she admits he makes her laugh. His nickname for her is "Dummy." She nearly got engaged to him and signed a lease on an apartment in Jacksonville before Jack Donaghy got over a pointless feud with Liz and stopped that. In his last two appearances on the show, Dennis has married an obnoxious Irish-American woman named Megan (whose maiden name is also Duffy) and they have adopted an African-American baby boy whom they call "Black Dennis". While Dennis is worthless, he did inspire Liz to finally declare her love for her new boyfriend Criss Chros and, later, to marry him. Dennis also is convinced that Liz converted to Judaism for Criss, despite the fact that neither he nor Liz practice any religion, but he somehow doesn't say anything offensive on the subject and Liz smiles because her last time seeing Dennis at her wedding confirm he's become less of a jackass.

Dennis is immature for a man his age, often exclaiming like a teenage boy. In one episode he sits on Liz's bed, playing Halo 3; then, he throws the controller down and yells that the controller is "defective" because "that grenade was right next to him!" He was the last remaining beeper salesman in New York City, and was known as the "Beeper King" (after the original Beeper King committed suicide). He concocts a number of money-making schemes, including a make-your-own coffee station, copying DVD movies onto LaserDisc, and devising a Balloon Boy-like stunt after being assigned to a program that pairs talented kids with troubled adults. In his final appearance, he brags that he has found success selling "suicide insurance". In the episode "100", it is revealed that his ancestors were kicked out of Ireland, then kicked out of America, sent back to Ireland, then set adrift on a log.

Appears in: "Jack Meets Dennis", "Tracy Does Conan", "The Break-Up", "Subway Hero", "Cooter", "Apollo, Apollo", "Anna Howard Shaw Day", "Emanuelle Goes to Dinosaur Land", "Operation Righteous Cowboy Lightning", "100", "Hey, Baby, What's Wrong", "St. Patrick's Day", "Mazel Tov, Dummies!"

=== Floyd DeBarber ===
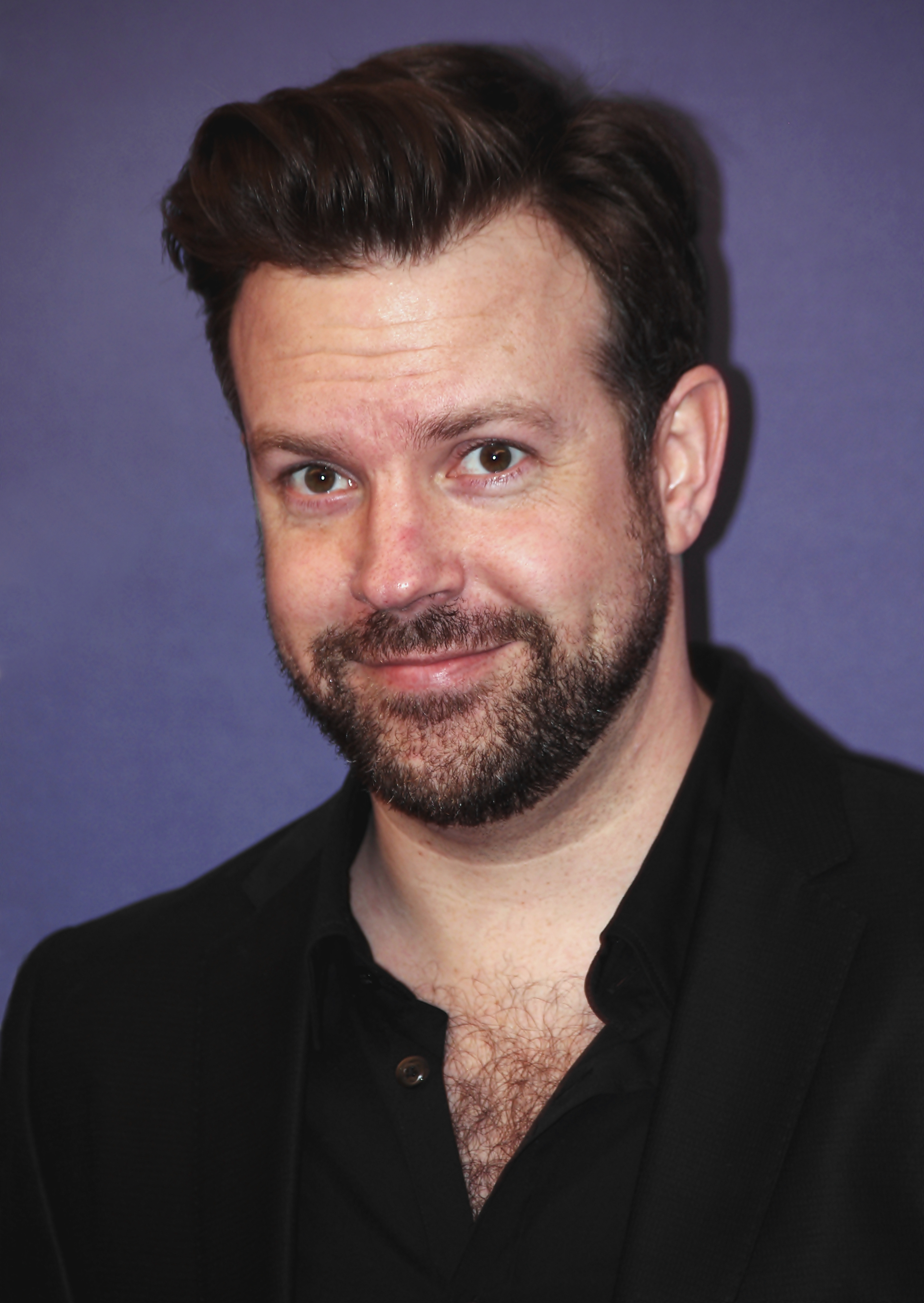
Jason Sudeikis portrays Floyd DeBarber

Floyd DeBarber (Jason Sudeikis) is an attorney working at 30 Rock. His name is a play on Floyd the Barber, a regular character on The Andy Griffith Show. Floyd's first appearance is when he accidentally sends flowers to Liz for Valentine's Day, which he actually intended to send to his girlfriend, Liz Lemler. Liz, who doesn't know his name, calls him "flower guy" and develops a crush on him. In "The Fighting Irish", Liz fires Liz Lemler and the rest of the accounting staff so that she can get closer to Floyd, with his girlfriend out of the building; however, Jack rehires the accountants and transfers Liz Lemler to a job at GE headquarters in Connecticut, thus breaking up Liz Lemler and Floyd. In "Fireworks", Liz follows Floyd to an AA meeting in order to get close to him and discovers that rules are important to him. When Liz lies about being an alcoholic so Floyd will confide in her, she discovers that members of the same AA group cannot date; therefore, she confesses she was never an alcoholic and merely had a crush on him. Floyd feels betrayed, but Liz makes it up to him by confiding in him and the two then begin dating. Jack becomes good friends with Floyd, calling him "the Floydster", much to Liz's dismay. Floyd eventually seems to want to spend more time with Jack than Liz. At the end of season one, Floyd decides that New York City is too much for him and decides to return to his hometown, Cleveland. Liz and Floyd go there on vacation; Floyd gets a job in Cleveland, and Liz returns to TGS in New York. Despite seeming perfect for each other, Floyd and Liz break up. In Season 4, Floyd returns in the episode "Floyd", announcing he is engaged to be married. His wedding eventually takes place in the fourth-season finale "I Do Do".

Appears in: "Up All Night", "The Source Awards", "The Fighting Irish", "Fireworks", "Corporate Crush", "Cleveland", "Hiatus", "Sandwich Day", "Anna Howard Shaw Day", "Floyd", "Emanuelle Goes to Dinosaur Land", "I Do Do".

=== Drew Baird ===
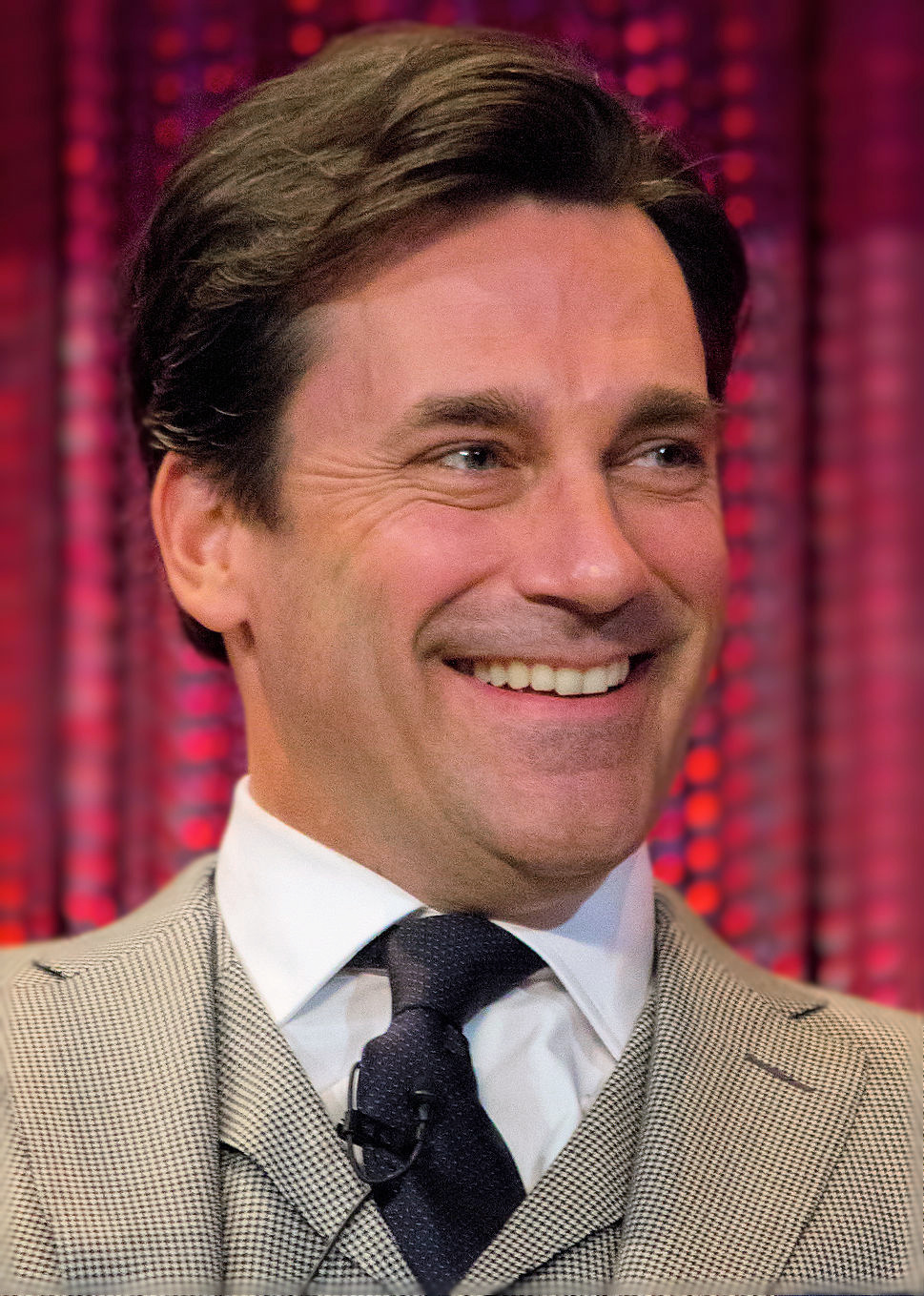
Jon Hamm portrays Drew Baird

Andrew Baird (Jon Hamm) is a pediatrician and Liz's handsome neighbor. He graduated from Columbia University medical school; Disney used a photo of him from his high school swim team as a model for Prince Eric in The Little Mermaid. His name is a play on Dr. Drew. He first appears in season three episode "Generalissimo", when Liz accidentally receives his mail. After going through the contents (which includes a warranty for his ice cream maker and his Netflix rentals: The Muppets Take Manhattan, Caddyshack, and a documentary on how pies are made), Liz decides he is perfect for her and creates a false persona so he will like her. Liz's scheme unravels, and Drew is disappointed in her; however, he reads her mail and tells her he feels Liz would have been someone he would have wanted to know. Eventually, they agree upon a fresh start.

He is recently divorced from Mandy and has one daughter from the marriage (Bethany, a rebellious teenager who drinks wine and starts fires). Liz and Drew's first date was on Valentine's Day 2009, during which Bethany ended up at Liz's apartment and Drew's mother died in the hospital. On her deathbed she reveals to Liz that she is not actually Drew's mother; the person Drew thinks is his sister is, in fact, his mother. She asks Liz to tell him the truth and Liz reveals this to Drew later in the episode.

In episode 15 of season three, ("The Bubble"), Liz is concerned about the way others treat Drew; he is so handsome that he unintentionally causes others to fawn over him. He was a professional tennis player in college even though he is terrible at it. Despite being horrible at everything from cooking to sex to not knowing how to perform the Heimlich maneuver, no one tells him the truth because he is so good-looking. Calvin Klein (in a cameo) stops him on the street and asks him to be an underwear model. He never has to wait in line at restaurants; when Liz (blocking Drew's face from view) orders his request off the menu and is berated by the waitress, he is mystified by her response and wonders where their complimentary appetizer sampler is. Jack, having firsthand knowledge of the situation from his younger days, describes this as "The Bubble." Liz tells Drew that he receives constant special treatment, and when Liz stops letting him win at tennis, he realizes that he is actually dimwitted and clumsy, lashing out at her. Eventually he apologizes for his behavior but prefers living in "The Bubble" to reality, asking Liz if she wants to take a ride with him on his new motorcycle. Liz declines and Drew rides into the sunset, careening incompetently down the street.

When Liz goes back to her ex-boyfriends in "Emanuelle Goes to Dinosaur Land", Drew appears with hooks on both hands: one hand had been lost in a firework explosion and the other in a helicopter accident, both caused by his stupidity. Drew later reappears in a cameo in season five episode "Live Show", having received one replacement hand from a death row inmate. The hand has a mind of its own, however, and begins to strangle him (In the West Coast version of "Live Show", Drew received a female hand transplant that constantly tries to seduce him). Liz later sums up Drew in the phrase "So handsome...so, so stupid."

Appears in: "Generalissimo", "St Valentine's Day", "The Bubble", "Anna Howard Shaw Day", "Emanuelle Goes to Dinosaur Land", "Live Show". Jon Hamm also appeared in "Live from Studio 6H", playing two roles, but not Drew.

=== Wesley Snipes ===
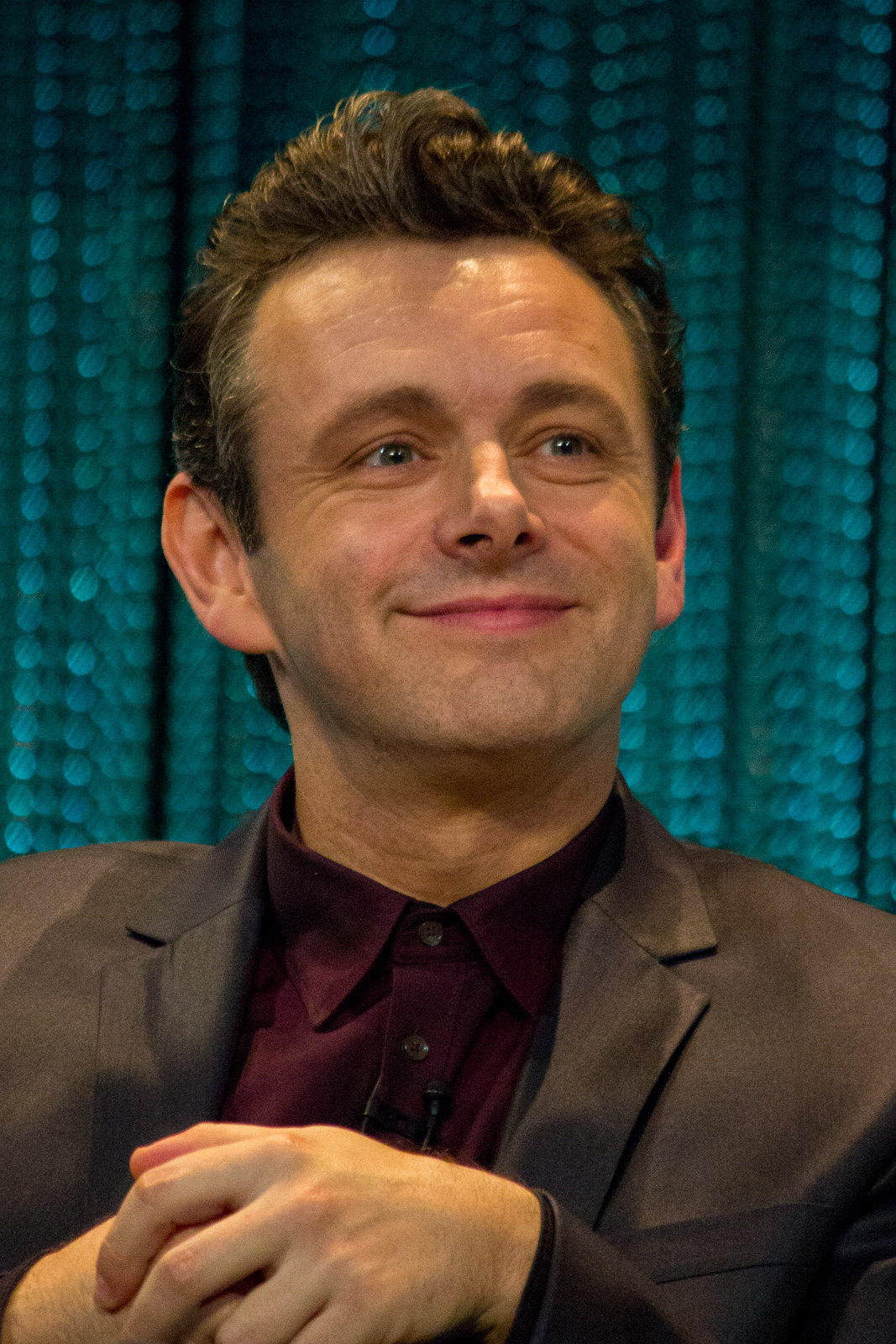
Michael Sheen portrays Wesley Snipes, an Englishman

Wesley Snipes (Michael Sheen) is an Englishman whom Liz meets at her dentist's office while recovering from a root canal operation. Being under the effects of nitrous oxide, they seem to hit it off and list each other in their phones as "Future Husband" and "Future Wife". When sober, they immediately realize that they have nothing in common and dislike each other intensely. However, when they keep meeting each other by chance around the city, they continue to date believing that it is their destiny to "settle" for one another.

Wesley is displeased that the actor Wesley Snipes has his name, saying that the name is better suited to a "pasty, un-athletic British man". He frequently uses (fictional) British English phrases, such as "foot cycle" for bicycle and "film pod" for video camera, which annoys Liz. He is rude to her, mocking her disastrous romantic history and at one point compares her life to a "Cathy cartoon that just won't end".

He believes they are "settling soul mates" and sets the stage for another meeting during "Sweeps", which Liz assumes refers to television sweeps week, but which he claims is what the British call spring cleaning. After a tour of her abysmal past relationships, she decides Wesley is her only alternative and reluctantly agrees to get engaged to him. However, in the Season 4 finale Liz meets a pilot, Carol (Matt Damon), whom she likes a lot and sends Wesley a break-up text. He stupidly thinks they're getting past their first fight, but Liz tells him she's realized after meeting Carol that she can do much better than Wesley, and says goodbye to him. He leaves the room in defeat and has not been seen since. In a Season 6 episode, a flashback scene has Liz outright telling her tax accountant "I'm having a go at cycling thanks to my boyfriend Wesley, whom I hate."

Appears in: "Future Husband", "Don Geiss, America and Hope", "Emanuelle Goes to Dinosaur Land", "I Do Do".

=== Astronaut Mike Dexter ===
Astronaut Mike Dexter (John Anderson) is Liz's fantasy boyfriend, to whom she compares all other men; Mike often appears when Liz is either alone or involved in disastrous relationships, and is no longer seen once she develops a (relatively) normal social life. Liz mentions Dexter in several episodes, and he appears in her imagination throughout Season 4. In a fantasy sequence in "Dealbreakers Talk Show#0001", Dexter tells Liz he has to go back to space, but "enjoyed the kissing followed by [his] genuine interest in that TV dance competition". In "The Moms", Liz reveals that Astronaut Mike Dexter is also (secretly) king of Monaco. Liz meets an attorney named Mike (also played by Anderson) at Floyd's wedding in "Emanuelle Goes to Dinosaur Land"; this Mike describes himself as a "plushie" who enjoys having sex ("yiffing") with people in mascot costumes at state parks. Anderson also appears, as a nod to Liz's fantasies of Dexter, in an episode of Jack's "Porn for Women" (which features handsome men asking women about their day), which Liz buys. ("Don Geiss, America and Hope")

Liz ends her idolization of the fictional astronaut after learning of her mother's premarital relationship with Buzz Aldrin (recreated in Liz's fantasy flashback by Fey and Anderson) and discussing the matter with present-day Aldrin in "The Moms".

Appears in: "Dealbreakers Talk Show#0001", "Don Geiss, America and Hope", "Emanuelle Goes to Dinosaur Land".

=== Carol Burnett ===
Carol Burnett (Matt Damon) is an airline pilot who begins a relationship with Liz in the season four finale. With an identical name to the television comic legend, he is Liz's second consecutive boyfriend with the same name as a celebrity (after Wesley Snipes). Their first date takes place after he learns that Liz is the head writer of TGS with Tracy Jordan, and she finds out that Carol is an enthusiastic fan of the show, often showing episodes on his flights. Liz enjoys their relationship at first because his frequent absences for work gives her freedom, people treat her much more kindly due to her dating someone as good looking as Matt Damon, and she and Carol have similar (though never outlined) ideas on how to peacefully end the Israeli-Arab conflict. Carol, however, is eager to settle down and pursue a more normal relationship, since every relationship he has had as an airline pilot were intermittent affairs due to his constant travel for work.

Initially, Liz believes their similar personalities make them soul mates after they repeatedly share the same responses to games of "Would you rather". However, they eventually realize that they are too similar, and in "Double-Edged Sword", their equally controlling personalities come to a head after a heated argument while being stuck for hours on the runway on a plane piloted by Carol.

Appears in: "I Do Do", "The Fabian Strategy", "Live Show", "Double-Edged Sword".

=== Criss Chros ===
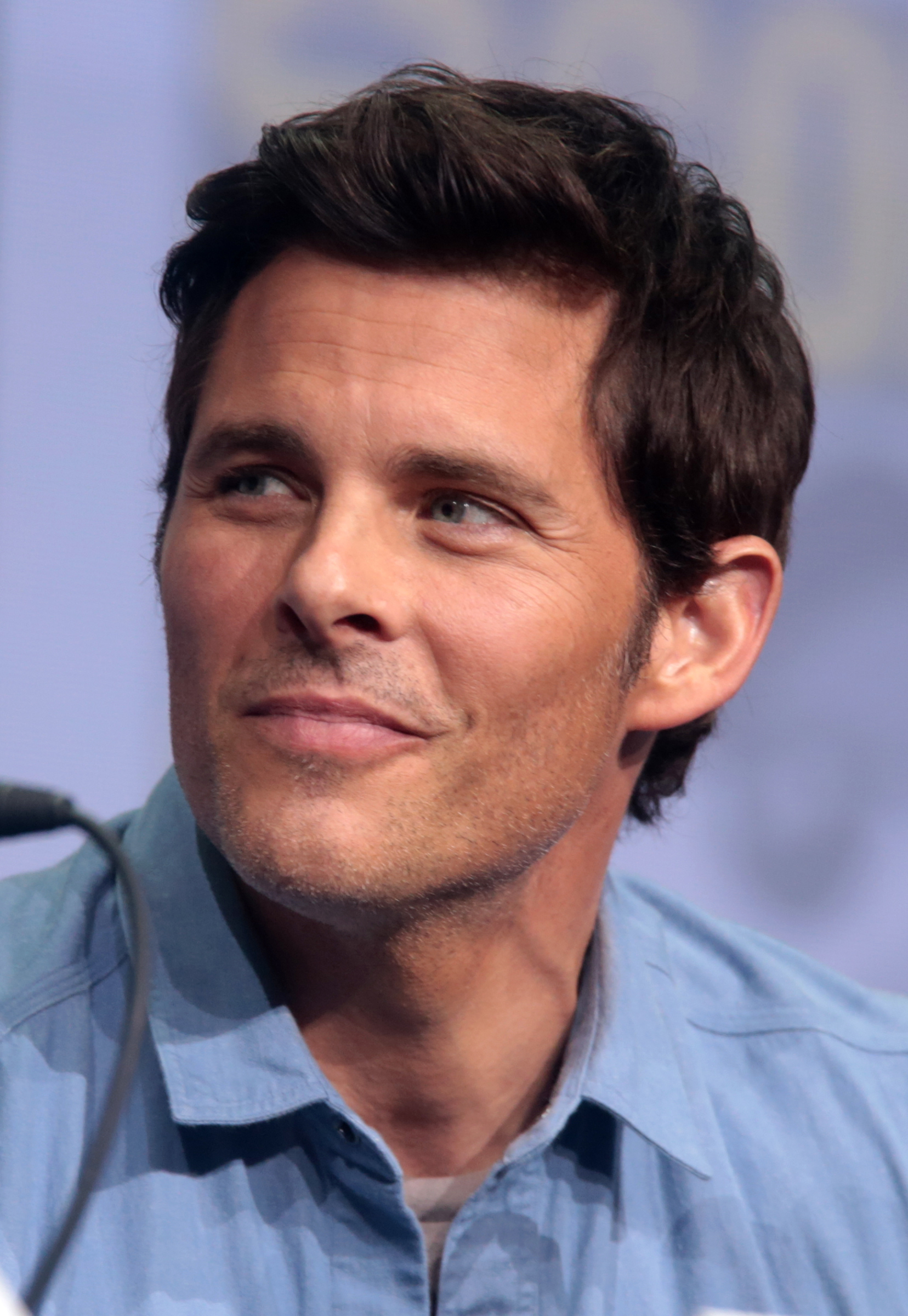
James Marsden portrays Criss Chros

Crisstopher Rick Chros (James Marsden) is an unemployed entrepreneur, and like Dot Com, attended Wesleyan University. Criss is the third of Liz's romantic interests to share a name with a celebrity (although there is a difference in spelling). He dropped out of law school, but holds a degree in ethnomusicology. He and Liz met somewhere between the end of season five and the beginning of season 6 at Riverside Park after Liz made fun of his turtleneck shirt. He runs a hot dog stand which sells organic hot dogs. It is revealed that he and Liz are dating in "Idiots Are People Two!" and that Liz has kept it a secret from Jack because she fears he'll disapprove of Criss – which Jack does, at first, but winds up changing his mind and gives Criss his "probational approval" card in "Idiots Are People Three!" In "Hey, Baby, What's Wrong", Liz discovers that her relationship with Criss has longevity after a failed trip to Ikea in which she and Criss have a big fight. Liz, assuming the fight is a breakup, frantically calls Criss to apologize and beg him to reconcile, only to discover that he never wanted to break up in the first place and is at home happily making dinner. In "St. Patrick's Day", a surprise visit from Dennis makes Liz finally admit that she is in love with Criss after an argument. When she tells him that she loves him, something she has never done to anyone, Criss responds by quoting Han Solo's response to Princess Leia, "I know", thereby proving his suitability to the Star Wars-obsessed Liz.

Jack sets up Liz on a "blind date" with Kevin, a man Jack actually hates, but his true purpose is to introduce Liz to Kevin's "awesome" Lemon-esque young daughter (Bebe Wood). After realizing that having children might be a good thing, Criss and Liz subsequently "put a pin" in this idea and decide to "just have some fun". Still, Criss is insecure in their relationship, believing that Liz might eventually bail on him. In the episode "What Will Happen to the Gang Next Year?", Criss sells his hot dog van to help pay for renovating Liz's apartment. Unfortunately he sells the van to "a really nice young guy on meth", who later steals money from a bank. Liz sees what she thinks is still Criss' van on a TV news report on the robbery, and thinking that Criss stole the money, tells him she will go to prison in his place. Criss considers this a sign that Liz will not bail on him, and later in the episode, when Liz observes that the room Criss is renovating will make a great nursery, they both realize that they are ready to try for a baby, whether biological or adopted.

As of Season 7, he and Liz are actively trying to have a child. Liz's unusual libido starts to make things a bit difficult, but they eventually find what works for them both. After a failed pregnancy test, Liz and Criss decide to get married to facilitate an adoption process. They are married in a brief ceremony at City Hall attended by Jack, Dennis Duffy and his family, two homeless men and Tony Bennett.

Liz and Criss eventually adopt a pair of elementary-school aged twins, Janet and Terry (who are highly reminiscent of Jenna and Tracy). Criss briefly goes to work as a dental receptionist, but discovers he much prefers being a stay-at-home father.

Appears in: "Idiots Are People Two!", "Idiots Are People Three!", "Hey, Baby, What's Wrong", "Leap Day", "St. Patrick's Day", "Murphy Brown Lied to Us", "The Return of Avery Jessup", "What Will Happen to the Gang Next Year?", "Governor Dunston", "Mazel Tov, Dummies!", "A Goon's Deed in a Weary World", "Hogcock!"

=== Liz's one-episode love interests ===
- Gretchen Thomas (Stephanie March) is a "brilliant plastics engineer / lesbian" and a friend of Jack Donaghy from his rotation in General Electric's plastics division. Assuming Liz to be bisexual if not a lesbian (and maintaining that her shoes are "definitely bi-curious"), Jack sets up the pair on a blind date in "Blind Date". When proposing the idea to Liz, Jack refers to her simply as "Thomas" (much as he generally addresses Liz by her surname, Lemon), and Liz is thus unaware of Gretchen's gender until meeting her. Despite Liz's lack of sexual attraction toward Gretchen, the two bond over dinner and Gretchen informs Jack that she finds Liz "great" and thinks she looks like Jennifer Jason Leigh. They enjoy a succession of platonic dates until Gretchen expresses that she feels she is starting to chase the straight girl and decides they should stop seeing each other. Liz attempts to make a pact that they reunite after 25 years and start a relationship then if they are both still single (including an offer to let Gretchen "do stuff to [her]" as long as Liz is not expected to reciprocate), but Gretchen walks away.
- Gray (Peter Hermann) appears in a season one episode as a tall, handsome and well-coiffed stranger Jenna and Liz keep bumping into at the 30 Rock building and refer to as "The Hair." When Liz and Gray finally meet, they trade witty banter and discover they share similar likes and annoyances. Although they seem to click, Liz cannot escape the feeling that their disparate levels of attractiveness make her unworthy to be with him. During a date that begins to turn romantic at Gray's apartment, Liz spots a photo of a mutual relative and they realize to their dismay that they're actually distant cousins. Liz shuts it down but before she leaves, Gray assures her that she is also a "hair."
- Steven Black (Wayne Brady) was Tracy's manager during season one. He briefly dated Liz during "The Source Awards", but Liz realized that they were incompatible after one date. When she attempted to break things off, Steven claimed that she was racist. Liz continued to date Steven, hoping he would see their incompatibility for himself. At the Source Awards Liz accidentally fired Tracy Jordan's gun, hitting Steven in the upper thigh while he was trying to remove his phone from her purse. This brought their relationship to an end. Wayne Brady exists in the 30 Rock universe independently of Steven Black, having been mentioned on the show, most notably in the season-one episode "Jack Meets Dennis" in which Liz remarks that Tracy stole a People's Choice Award from him.
- Jamie Hamilton or "The Coffee Guy" (Val Emmich), who only appears in "Cougars", is an attractive younger man who has a crush on Liz Lemon, to whom he delivers coffee. Jamie refers to Liz as the "Sexy Librarian." As the two start to develop feelings for each other, Frank admits that he also has feelings for Jamie. Jamie asks Liz out on a date, but Liz refuses to go due to the difference in their ages. She asks Jamie how old he thinks she is and Jamie guesses 29. Liz quickly lies about her age and agrees that she is definitely 29. Jamie also lies about his age, telling Liz that he's 25, convincing Liz to consider the date. On their date, Liz admits that she's actually 37, whereupon Jamie reveals that he's in fact only 20. Jenna tells Liz that they're cougars. Liz becomes used to the idea of dating a much younger man and agrees to try it out. However, on a subsequent date, she meets Jamie's mother, Beth, who, in addition to sharing her proper forename (Elizabeth), bears a startling resemblance to Liz in looks and dress (indeed, portrayed by Tina Fey's lighting stand-in, Laura Berrios). Seeing Jamie next to Beth, Liz remarks under her breath, "Yup, that's what we look like." She immediately leaves and says "shut it down", ending their relationship.
- Stewart LaGrange (Peter Dinklage) is a diplomatic attaché who works at the United Nations, whom Liz encountered in the episode "Señor Macho Solo" after rubbing on his head from behind while "baby crazy", having mistaken him for a child due to his dwarfism. Stewart develops an interest in her due to assuming that her action was an aggressive form of flirting, and takes her out on several dates, while Liz, despite finding him charming, feels mildly uncomfortable due to the circumstances of their meeting. She inadvertently reveals her mistake when she instinctively pulls him back from a fire, offending him greatly. Liz later calls to apologize and suggests a meeting at the Brooklyn Bridge to see if they're willing to try again. However, Liz ends up mistaking a small child for Stewart, who witnesses it and turns away saying "shut it down".
- Gavin Volure (Steve Martin) is a rich entrepreneur and owner of a company called "Sunstream". Volure is agoraphobic, which leaves him confined to his Connecticut estate. Liz becomes interested in a relationship with Gavin when she discovers that his agoraphobia would prevent them from being intimate, something that Liz desires. Gavin later reveals to Liz that he is not agoraphobic, but is really under house arrest for arson, tax fraud, embezzlement and racketeering. Gavin attempts to escape the confines of his home with Liz, but he is captured. Gavin then later attempts a second escape, which succeeds. Gavin runs to TGS where he asks Liz to escape with him to Canada, but Liz refuses. Gavin then climbs to the top of the TGS set with the intention to jump, but, he is stopped by Tracy Jordan and presumably returned to his Connecticut estate.
- Brad Halster (Roger Bart) A consultant employed by the Himmler Group, Halster slashes TGS's budget and staff in "Cutbacks". Liz attempts to seduce him into restoring her employees' jobs by asking him out on a date and using the show's make-up crew and wardrobe department to maximize her sex appeal. Halster does not reverse his cuts the next morning, and is devastated when an angry Liz causes him to realise the quid-pro-quo nature of the date and moderate petting. Liz's plan ultimately succeeds, however, as Halster's sexual harassment complaint against her necessitates his recusal from consulting on TGS’ budget and Jack Donaghy personally handles evaluating the show. Liz's suspension also gives her a much-needed vacation from work.
- James Franco (himself) was involved in a mock relationship with Jenna, orchestrated by his publicist in an attempt to quell the rumors of his infatuation with his Japanese love pillow, Kimiko, in "Klaus and Greta". The generally sexually repressed Liz uncharacteristically initiates their one-night stand, telling Franco after running into him and Kimiko at a bar, "Let's do this", and repairing to her apartment for their assignation.

== Jack's love interests ==
The following characters have (at some point during the show) been Jack's girlfriend, wife or fiancée.

=== Bianca ===
Bianca (Isabella Rossellini) is Jack's first wife. Jack's mother disliked her from the beginning and their marriage was troubled. Bianca was introduced in season one, episode twelve. She is engaged to Vincent Foley, and in episode 13 her divorce with Jack was finalized (although they were legally separated since 1989). Jack mentioned that she was too much of a woman for him, which is why they divorced. A point of contention in their divorce was an Arby's restaurant outside of Telluride, Colorado. Jack also insisted on keeping the box they had trained their dog to poop in. Bianca tolerated most of Jack's affairs but is jealous of women who can actually make Jack happy, going so far as to violently attack Liz when she pretended to be Jack's fiancée.

Appears in: "Black Tie", "Up All Night".

=== Condoleezza Rice ===
Condoleezza Rice (portrayed by herself) was one of Jack's shorter-lived relationships. Their relationship (and eventual break-up) was alluded to in the episode "The Break-Up". Rice later appeared as herself in the season-five episode "Everything Sunny All the Time Always", angry at Jack for apparently ending their relationship with a text message that said "you + me = :(". Among their disagreements concerned her lack of time for him during her tenure as Secretary of State and whether or not Jack was as talented a flautist as Condoleezza is as a pianist.

=== Phoebe ===
Phoebe (Emily Mortimer) is an art dealer and auctioneer, who works at the Christie's branch in Rockefeller Center. She is (supposedly) English, claiming to suffer from vertigo and something called "avian bone syndrome" allegedly having "hollow bones" (which requires that no one touch her due to her supposed fragility). She reintroduces herself to Liz each time they meet, and asserts that her parents were poets. Jack attracts Phoebe's attention; the two begin dating, and after Liz gave them her blessing Jack quickly asked Phoebe to marry him. She accepts, stunning Liz. Jack takes Phoebe to Paris, where he experiences a failure to perform sexually with her. Furthermore, her reckless spending of Jack's money reveals that Phoebe is a gold digger. When Liz finds Phoebe holding hands with an older man, Phoebe tells her that he is a former lover. Liz tells her that either she will tell Jack the truth or Liz will; while arguing with Liz, Phoebe drops her English accent and reveals herself as an American. When Liz tells Jack he refuses to believe her, having been warned by Phoebe that Liz was making things up about her. When Jack's mother Colleen appears in "Hiatus", she instantly dislikes Phoebe. When Colleen visits Jack in the hospital, she discovers that Jack's heart rate monitor functions as a polygraph, and takes advantage of this discovery by asking Jack a series of personal questions. Phoebe catches on and asks Jack if he loves her. He claims that he does, but the machine indicates he is lying. Phoebe slinks away in defeat; their wedding was subsequently canceled.

Appears in: "Corporate Crush", "Cleveland", "Hiatus".

=== C. C. ===
Celeste "C. C." Cunningham (Edie Falco; in-universe by Candace van der Shark (Kristen Wiig) in the Lifetime movie, A Dog Took My Face and Gave Me a Better Face to Change the World: The Celeste Cunningham Story) is a Democratic Congresswoman from Vermont. She meets Jack at a cocktail party honoring Robert Novak, and the two end up sleeping together. Soon after, Jack discovers her identity and the fact that she is trying to sue NBC's fictitious parent company, Sheinhardt Wig, for dumping Auburn Fantasy Dye No. 260 into the Chickatagua River (which turned the children of Chickatagua orange). Despite Jack and C.C.'s political conflicts they decide to pursue a relationship (secretly at first), eventually revealing it in Jack's executive dining room. Due to job-related commitments (Jack lives in New York City and C.C. lives in Washington, D.C.), they decide to break up. She returns in "Cooter", approving the development of a gay bomb; this gets Jack fired from his position in Washington, so he can return to 30 Rock (and repays a favor she owed him).

Appears in: "Somebody to Love", "Secrets and Lies", Episode 210, "Cooter".

=== Elisa Pedriera ===
Elisa Pedriera (Salma Hayek) is a Puerto Rican nurse, who is deeply religious and places a high value on family. She was introduced as a love interest for Jack in season three, when she cared for Colleen (who had injured both hips). While nursing Colleen, Elisa begins a romantic relationship with Jack. She also cares for another patient: an elderly, wheelchair-using man with Alzheimer's disease. Colleen hates Elisa and Jack's relationship; he accuses her of hating every woman with whom he has ever been involved. Elisa's grandmother initially dislikes Jack because he resembles an actor playing a villain on her favorite telenovela; she becomes fond of him after Jack has NBC purchase the rights to the show, and changes his doppelgänger's part to appeal to elderly women. Although Elisa and Jack had relationship problems on Valentine's Day, they made up (influenced by their love of McDonald's McFlurries). In "Larry King", Jack proposes to Elisa. She accepts, informing him that she is going to Puerto Rico and promising to call him. When she returns, Elisa and Jack begin planning their wedding; however, it is revealed that Elisa is notorious among Puerto Ricans for killing her husband after she discovered he was cheating on her. She flies into a homicidal rage when she believes Jack and Liz are having an affair; after being dissuaded she calms down, agreeing with Jack to cancel the wedding and end the relationship because she cannot control her jealousy.

At some point thereafter, while back home in Puerto Rico, Elisa is incarcerated. In "Hogcock!", Jack convinces Elisa and Nancy Donovan to set aside their devout Catholicism and participate in a ménage à trois conjugal visit to Elisa's prison, the intensity of which rids both women of their accents.

Appears in: "Señor Macho Solo", "Flu Shot", "Generalissimo", "St. Valentine's Day", "Larry King", "The Ones", "Hogcock!"

=== Nancy Donovan ===
Nancy Donovan (Julianne Moore; in-universe by Cynthia Nixon in "Kidnapped by Danger"), was Jack's high-school crush, a devout Catholic with a pronounced Boston accent. She is married with two sons, though it is clear her marriage is unfulfilling. She and Jack were in the same German class (where Jack was called "Klaus" and Nancy "Greta"); Nancy's voice-mail code stands for "Klaus", indicating that Nancy has feelings for him. By the time Nancy decides to divorce her husband, Jack is already involved with Avery. He dates both women, unable to decide. Nancy meets Avery and finds out she is pregnant, which Nancy tells Jack before leaving. She is played by Cynthia Nixon in the TV-movie made about Avery, Kidnapped by Danger. In "Hogcock!", Jack reconnects with Nancy and Elisa Pedrera, convincing both women to set aside their devout Catholicism and participate in a ménage à trois conjugal visit to Elisa's prison, the intensity of which rids both women of their accents.

Appears in: "Secret Santa", "Winter Madness", "Lee Marvin vs. Derek Jeter", "Emanuelle Goes to Dinosaur Land", "I Do Do", "Hogcock!"

=== Avery Jessup-Donaghy ===
Avery Jessup (Elizabeth Banks; in-universe by Jenna Maroney [Jane Krakowski] in the film Kidnapped by Danger) is Jack's second wife. Jessup is a conservative media personality and the host of political talk-show The Hot-Box and commentator on CNBC. She begins their relationship after a one-night stand during season four, after Jack is convinced that Nancy will never leave her husband. He dates both simultaneously, and later chooses Avery over Nancy after being told by Nancy that Avery is pregnant. Of Swedish descent from Maryland, she attended Choate and Yale University. They attempt to marry during season five, between "Christmas Attack Zone" and "Mrs. Donaghy"; however, due to a language-based mishap, Jack is accidentally married to Liz (the matter is resolved offscreen). Avery gives birth to her and Jack's daughter during "Double-Edged Sword" in Toronto (making her Canadian-American), and names her Elizabeth Donaghy after Liz Lemon (nicknamed "Liddy" in honor of "Liddy" Dole, G. Gordon Liddy and Jack's martial-arts instructor, Li Di.). In "Everything Sunny All the Time Always", Avery is on a trip described by Jack as "a hot-blondes-in-weird-places initiative" by NBC News in Asia. However, things do not go well; she is detained in North Korea by Kim Jong-il, and forced to participate in the spread of North Korean Propaganda by reporting news of the free world being conquered by North Korea. Despite Jack's attempts to get her back (including receiving help from his ex, Condoleezza Rice) she is stranded in Korea and forcibly married to Kim Jong-un. Jack has a hard time dealing with her absence, as well as his intense feelings for her mother, Diana. Avery is rescued from North Korea toward the end of the sixth season ("The Return of Avery Jessup"). Shortly after Avery's return, Jack discovers that Avery has fallen in love with another detained reporter, and the couple spontaneously divorce at the altar while trying to renew their vows in the last episode of season 6.

Appears in: "Anna Howard Shaw Day", "Future Husband", "Lee Marvin vs. Derek Jeter", "The Moms", "Emanuelle Goes to Dinosaur Land", "I Do Do", "When it Rains, it Pours", "Gentleman's Intermission", "Christmas Attack Zone", "¡Qué Sorpresa!", "Double-Edged Sword", "Everything Sunny All the Time Always", "The Return of Avery Jessup", "What Will Happen to the Gang Next Year?".

== Main characters' relatives ==
=== Dick Lemon ===
Dick Lemon (Buck Henry; Sheffield Chastain as young Dick) is the father of Liz and Mitch Lemon. Like Liz, he grew up in White Haven, Pennsylvania, where he still lives. Liz mentions that he served at Pearl Harbor, although it is quickly revealed that this was during the Korean War. Outwardly supportive of Liz, Dick secretly disagrees with, and is embarrassed by, many of her decisions. At one point he arrives in New York declaring that he and his wife are "on a break" and he even accidentally tries to hit on Liz in a dark nightclub. Unknown to Liz, Dick once made out with Jenna on New Year's Eve.

Appears in: "Ludachristmas", "Gentleman's Intermission", "Kidnapped by Danger"

=== Margaret Lemon ===
Margaret Lemon (née Freeman) (Anita Gillette; uncredited actress in "Kidnapped by Danger"; Tina Fey as a teen in "The Moms") is Liz's mother. Born circa 1937, she "repeatedly lost her virginity" at or about the age of 15 to the love of her life, Buzz Aldrin (whom she called "Ed" because there were already five "Buzzes" in Montclair), while Waldo the town perv watched from the bushes. After she graduated from secretary school and Ed was joining the astronaut program in 1963, he asked her to marry him, but Margaret had just started a job with Sterling Cooper and did not feel she could just pick up and leave, being an "old maid" of 26. Accordingly, she later settled for Dick Lemon and bore him two children: Mitch Lemon and Elizabeth M. "Liz" Lemon. She still believes computers to be the size of rooms. Like Dick, Margaret expresses support for Liz but quietly disagrees with many of her decisions and opinions. She attempts to disabuse Liz of the belief in a "Mr. Right" and encourages her to settle as she did. Dr. Aldrin, meanwhile, is grateful to not have put Margaret through his years of alcoholism and depression.

Appears in: "Ludachristmas", "The Moms", "Kidnapped by Danger"

=== Terry and Janet ===
Terry and Janet (Dante Hoagland and Remy Bond) are fraternal twins whom Liz and Criss adopt in "A Goon's Deed in a Weary World". In addition to their genders, races, and names, their personalities are immediately revealed to be nearly identical to those of, respectively, Tracy and Jenna. Upon meeting them at the airport, Liz muses happily that gaining miniature versions of her two 'problem children' just as TGS is cancelled "seems about right" and she embraces the pair.

After a year in the Lemon–Chros family, Terry and Janet appear to have become less like Tracy and Jenna; they are well-behaved on the set of Grizz & Herz, sitting quietly off-camera and studying their homework while their mother and Dot Com produce the show.

Appear in: "A Goon's Deed in a Weary World", "Hogcock!", "Last Lunch"

=== Eliza Lemon ===
Eliza Lemon (Barrett Doss) is Liz's African-American great-granddaughter who appears in the last scene of the series. Growing up, Eliza hears the stories Liz would tell about her days at NBC. As an adult in the early 22nd century, she develops a sitcom based on those stories, which she pitches to NBC's receptive (and strangely immortal and ageless) president, Kenneth Parcell, while flying cars zoom through the sky past his office window. Kenneth only addresses her as "Ms. Lemon".

The sequence is an homage to St. Elsewhere's famous closing scene — complete with a model of the series' namesake building within a snow globe stared at by a mentally challenged male – and implies that the series 30 Rock had been a period piece of Eliza's creation in the distant future, as St. Elsewhere had all been a daydream in Tommy Westphall's autistic imagination.

Appears in: "Last Lunch"

=== Paul L'astnamé (Mr. Jenna Maroney) ===
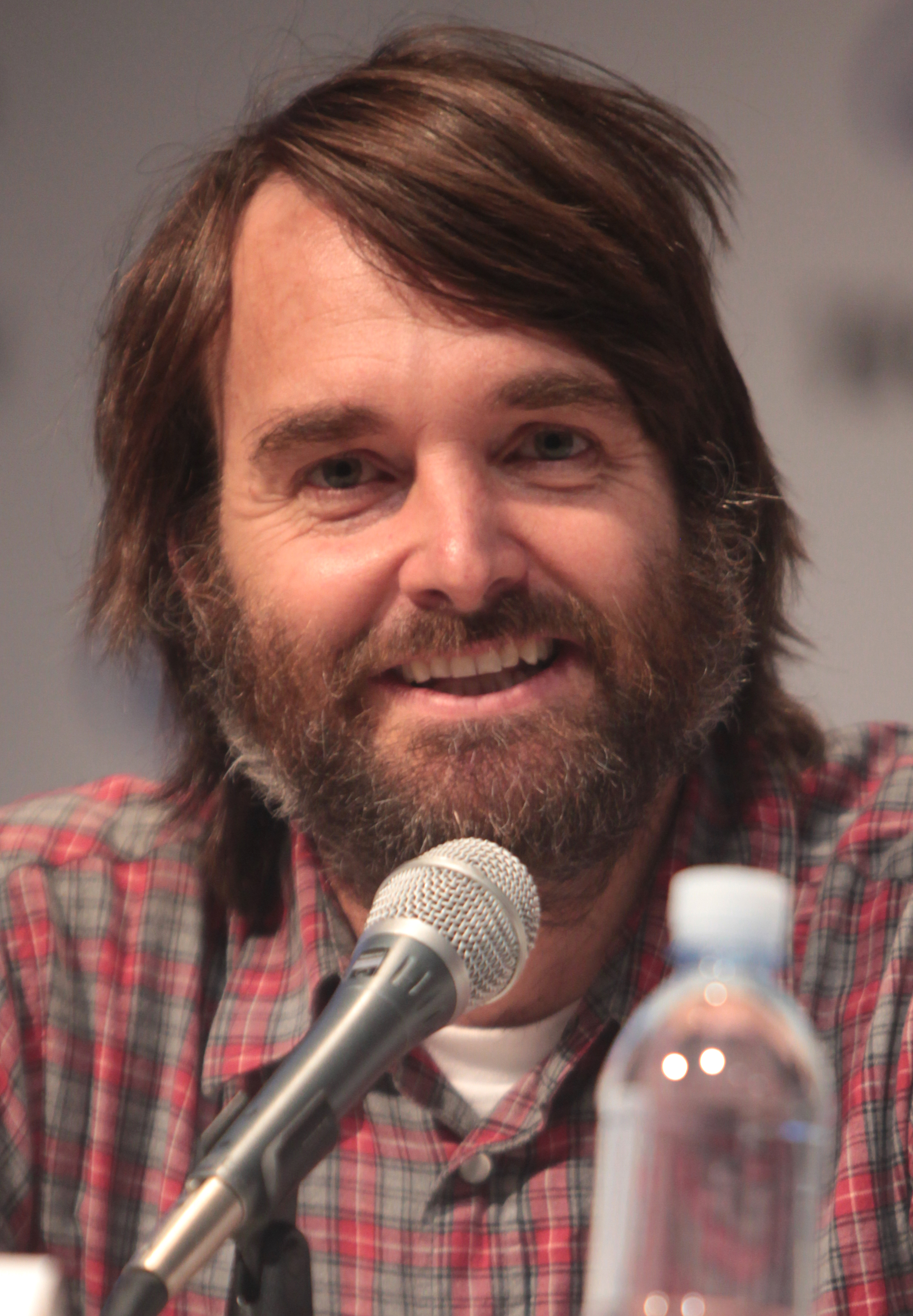
Will Forte portrays Paul L'astnamé, Jenna's fiancé

Mr. Jenna Maroney, formerly known as Paul L'astnamé (Will Forte), is Jenna's boyfriend and later husband. He is a female-impersonator (most often dressed as Jenna) who often refers to himself as a "she-man" or "shman." Paul and Jenna first met when Paul won first place in a Jenna Maroney impersonator contest in which Jenna herself placed fourth (parody of an urban legend about Charlie Chaplin, who allegedly finished fourth in a Charlie Chaplin contest, and of Dolly Parton who has confirmed the same happened to her at a drag-queen contest she entered) and Jenna realized that by dating Paul she could date herself. They began a relationship characterized by many unconventional sexual practices. The pair become engaged to marry when he crashes a TGS sketch in "Live from Studio 6H". In "My Whole Life Is Thunder", Jenna and Paul are married in a surprise ceremony at the funeral of Jack's mother. Paul takes Jenna's first and last names.

Appears in: "Argus", "I Do Do", "Chain Reaction of Mental Anguish", "Christmas Attack Zone", "100", "Respawn", "The Tuxedo Begins", "Meet the Woggels!", "Murphy Brown Lied to Us", "Live from Studio 6H", "My Whole Life Is Thunder."

Forte had previously appeared in 30 Rock as Tomas, a servant of Prince Gerhardt, in the season one episode "Black Tie".

=== Angie Jordan ===
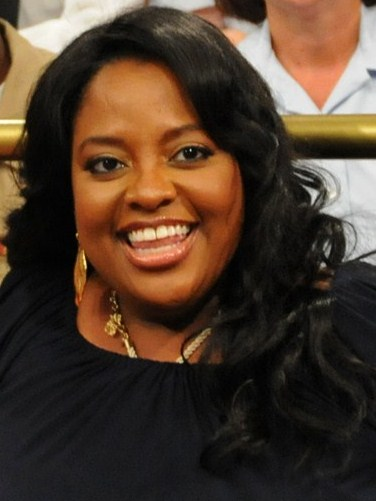
Sherri Shepherd portrays Angie Jordan, Tracy's wife

Angie Jordan (Sherri Shepherd [Sharon Wilkins in "Jack the Writer"]) is Tracy Jordan's wife. A domineering, bombastic person, she is demanding of her husband (financially and sexually). It is revealed in "The Ones" that Tracy has actually never cheated on his wife, and that his supposed "affairs" are all for show. In "Mrs. Donaghy", Angie stars in her own Bravo reality series, Queen of Jordan (which figured prominently during the rest of season five, due to Tracy Morgan's medical leave).

For her initial appearance in "Jack the Writer" (a non-speaking cameo appearance), she was played by Sharon Wilkins. In all subsequent episodes (beginning with "Up All Night"), she is portrayed by Sherri Shepherd and has a more substantial role.

Appears in: "Up All Night", "Jack Gets in the Game", "The Collection", "Señor Macho Solo", "Dealbreakers Talk Show #0001", "Mrs. Donaghy", "Queen of Jordan", "Queen of Jordan 2: Mystery of the Phantom Pooper".

=== Colleen Donaghy ===
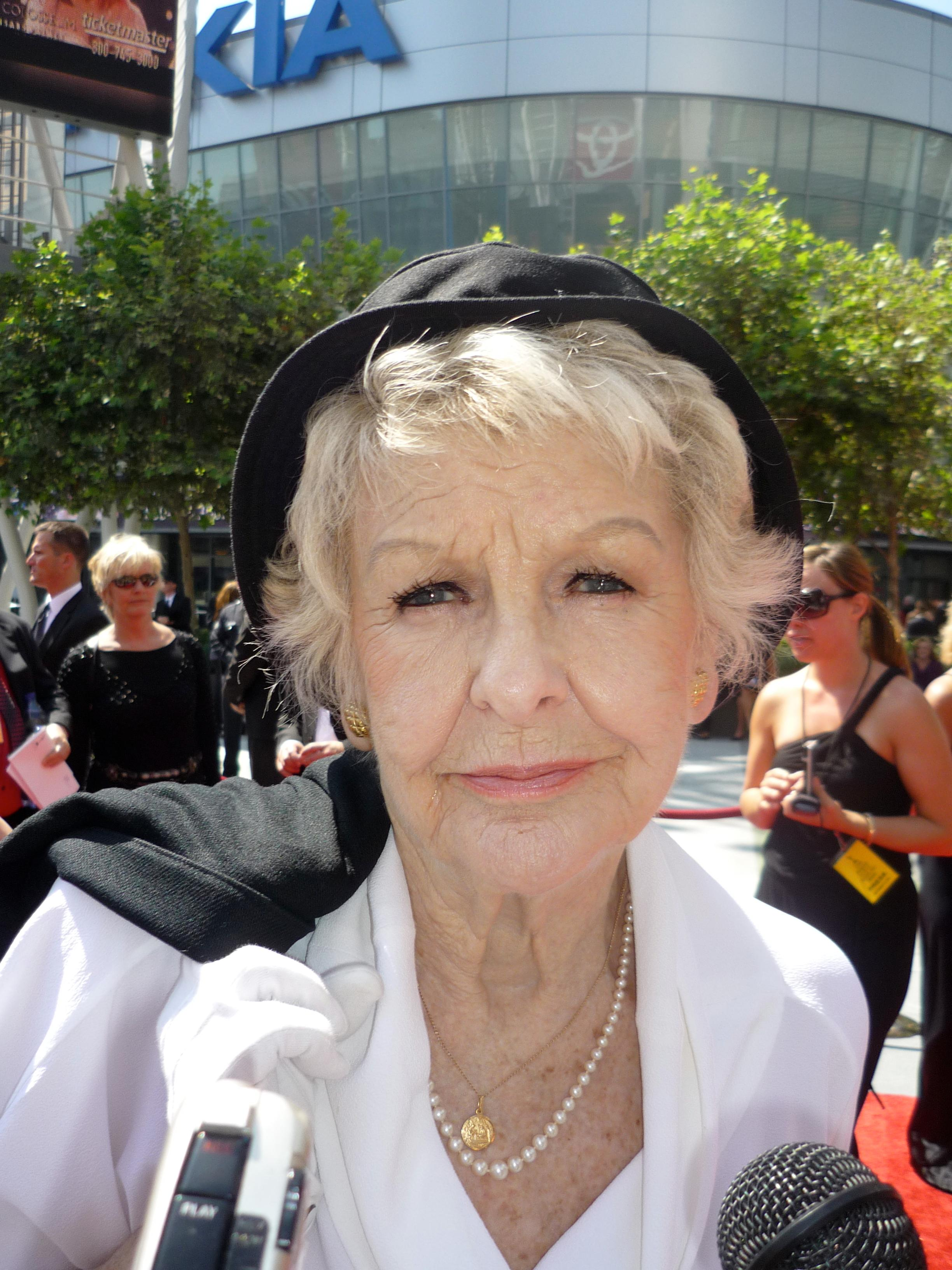
Elaine Stritch portrays Colleen Donaghy, Jack's mother

Colleen Donaghy (née Murphy; Elaine Stritch, Nicol Paone in flashback) is Jack's overbearing, demanding mother who lives in a Florida retirement home. She and Jack share a tense and often confrontational relationship, although deep down they do, in fact, love each other. Colleen first appeared in season 1, episode 21; she is critical of Jack's abilities, and hesitant to show him affection. In season 3, episode 20, Colleen reveals that her ex-husband (Jimmy Donaghy) left her in 1957 and returned in 1959. The revelation leads Jack to conclude that Jimmy Donaghy could not have been his real father. It is later revealed that Jack's father is Milton Greene, a boarder in the Donaghy house with whom Colleen had an affair during Jim's absence. Jimmy Donaghy seemed to have been possibly aware of this impossibility when he met Jack after many years of absence (in an attempt to scam him), calling him a 'half-an-Englishman'. It is unknown if any of her other children (Eddie, Patrick, Patricia, or Katherine Catherine) were also illegitimate.

Colleen's relationship with Jack is often tense, owing to her constant criticism and her meddling in Jack's private life. When Jack was a child, Colleen was impossibly demanding of him, and often threatened him with absurd punishments for minor misbehavior. She, for example, took an 8-year-old Jack to the post office, threatening to mail him back to "the Stork" after he spilled juice on a couch reserved for the pope. She also once told a young Jack that John F. Kennedy was shot because he had talked in church. When Jack's collie, Pop, was accidentally run over by the postman, Colleen left him to die in the street. She even tried to send Jack to Vietnam when he was 12 years old to make a man out of him. Colleen embarrassed him by having him play "The Star-Spangled Banner" on his flute in front of his hockey team, and mocked his decision to join the high school diving team, saying it was "a great way to meet guys.”

Despite her icy, stern demeanor, Colleen is shown to have been a deeply devoted mother. In a "Leap Day" flashback she is shown to have supported her family by working as a nurse at a local hospital (a position that at the time required her to sell cigarettes to patients as part of her duties). Having been abandoned by her husband, and without significant financial means, she would exchange sexual favors with fictional toy store proprietor Frederick August Otto Schwarz, III to provide Christmas presents for her children. Unaware of the transaction, Jack resented his mother for her infidelity toward his father. It was not until Liz Lemon questioned how such a poor family could afford so many gifts (Jack claims that there were so many "you couldn't see the tree") that Jack realized the true motive behind Colleen's actions. Colleen additionally created unique Christmas traditions and fables for her children that Jack assumed were standard holiday practice, such as Mrs. Claus hanging the children's stockings.

Despite rarely having a good thing to say about anyone, Colleen takes an instant liking to Liz, mistaking her for Jack's actual fiancée, Phoebe, and being visibly disappointed when Jack insists he and Liz are not engaged. Although fond of Liz, Colleen nevertheless delights in critiquing Liz's appearance, and on one occasion manipulating the Lemons into a resentment-fueled fight.

In "Meet the Woggles" Colleen reveals that Jack has always been her favorite child, since he always ate his vegetables, regularly attended church, and loved breastfeeding. Jack tells her that he only wanted to make her proud of him. She gives him a jewelry box that belonged to her mother, "Unclaimed Irish Stowaway" for her granddaughter, Liddy.

Colleen dies of a heart attack in "My Whole Life Is Thunder" during a visit to New York to spend time with Jack, attempting to guilt him and seemingly depriving him of her approval literally up to her last breath. Her last words to Jack are "I just want you to be happy", which Jack interprets as sarcastic, calling them "one last twist of the knife." Jack and Liz subsequently discover in "Florida" that Colleen spent her final years in a cohabitational lesbian relationship and – much more shockingly – was happy and well-liked in the couple's retirement community, where she had a reputation as a friendly and fun-loving prankster. Jack is sent into a tailspin by the revelation that his mother actually wanted him to be happy, which leads to him re-evaluating his life and career in the finale.

Appears in: "Hiatus", "Ludachristmas", "Christmas Special", "The Natural Order", "The Moms", "Christmas Attack Zone", "Meet the Woggels!", "My Whole Life Is Thunder", and in still photographs in "Florida".

=== Milton Greene ===
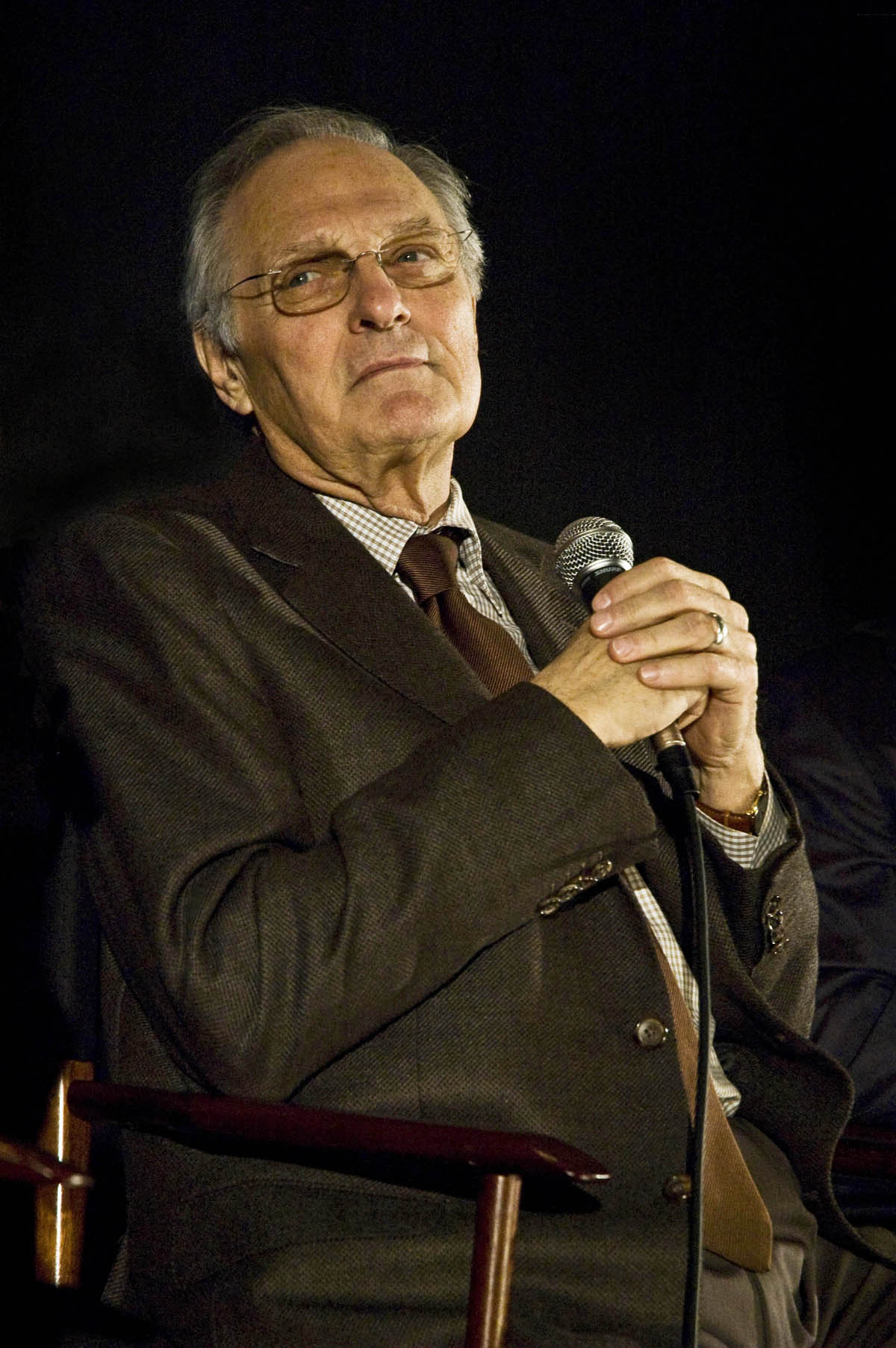
Alan Alda portrays Milton Greene, Jack's biological father

Milton Greene (Alan Alda) is Jack's biological father. Milton rented a room from Colleen Donaghy in the Boston suburb of Sadchester in 1958, during one of Jimmy Donaghy's numerous long absences from his family. The two soon began a physical affair and, unbeknownst to Milton, conceived Jack.

A half-century later, Milton is a politically liberal professor of history at Vermont's Bennington College. In the interim, Milton had married and fathered a son named Spider-Man (Milton and his wife believed that children should be able to choose their own names). An admirer of Jimmy Carter, Milton is the author of a multi-volume biography of the former president, entitled From Peanut to President. Betty White is seen reading a volume when Tracy Jordan telephones her in "Stone Mountain".

Jack discovers in "The Natural Order" that Jimmy Donaghy had been gone when Jack was conceived. He and Len Wozniak narrow his possible fathers down to three men whom Jack lures to Manhattan under false pretences in "Mamma Mia". Seeing that George Park is Korean and then learning that Fred O'Dwyer lost his genitals in a grenade explosion during World War II, Jack invites Milton to his office and reveals their relation. Milton is overjoyed and announces that he is in need of a kidney to survive. In "Kidney Now!", Jack is relieved to learn that he is not a match and decides to hold a charity concert to find a kidney for Milton. It is revealed in "Christmas Attack Zone" that Elvis Costello was a tissue match and donated a kidney to Milton.

Milton's liberalism is exaggerated as a foil to Jack's conservative politics. He is kind, enthusiastic, and supportive of Jack.

Appears in: "Mamma Mia", "Kidney Now!", "Christmas Attack Zone".

=== Tracy Jr., George Foreman and Virginia Jordan ===
Tracy Jordan Jr. (Bobb'e J. Thompson) is the combative son of Tracy and Angie Jordan. The Jordans have another son, George Foreman Jordan, who appeared in "Gavin Volure" and "The Bubble" (played by Jalani McNair), and had his first speaking role in the season 6 episode "Meet the Woggels!", where he was accepted into Stanford University (to Tracy's disapproval) and played by Dante E. Clark. The Jordans' daughter Virginia was born in "When It Rains, It Pours", and appears twice in the 6th and 7th Season, played by twin infants Zoya and Zuri Bacai.

Appears in: "Gavin Volure", "Succession", "The Funcooker", "The Bubble", "Sun Tea" (Tracy Jr.), "Gavin Volure", "The Bubble", "Meet the Woggels!" (George Foreman), "Queen of Jordan 2: Mystery of the Phantom Pooper" and "Aunt Phatso vs. Jack Donaghy" (Virginia)

=== Verna Maroney ===
Verna Maroney (Jan Hooks) is Jenna's mother. A quintessential stage mother, she spent Jenna's childhood forcing her to perform in beauty pageants and talent shows, and is responsible for Jenna's need for the spotlight and for many of her neuroses. Verna became the last live-action role Hooks played before she died.

Appears in: "Verna", "The Moms".

=== Diana Jessup ===
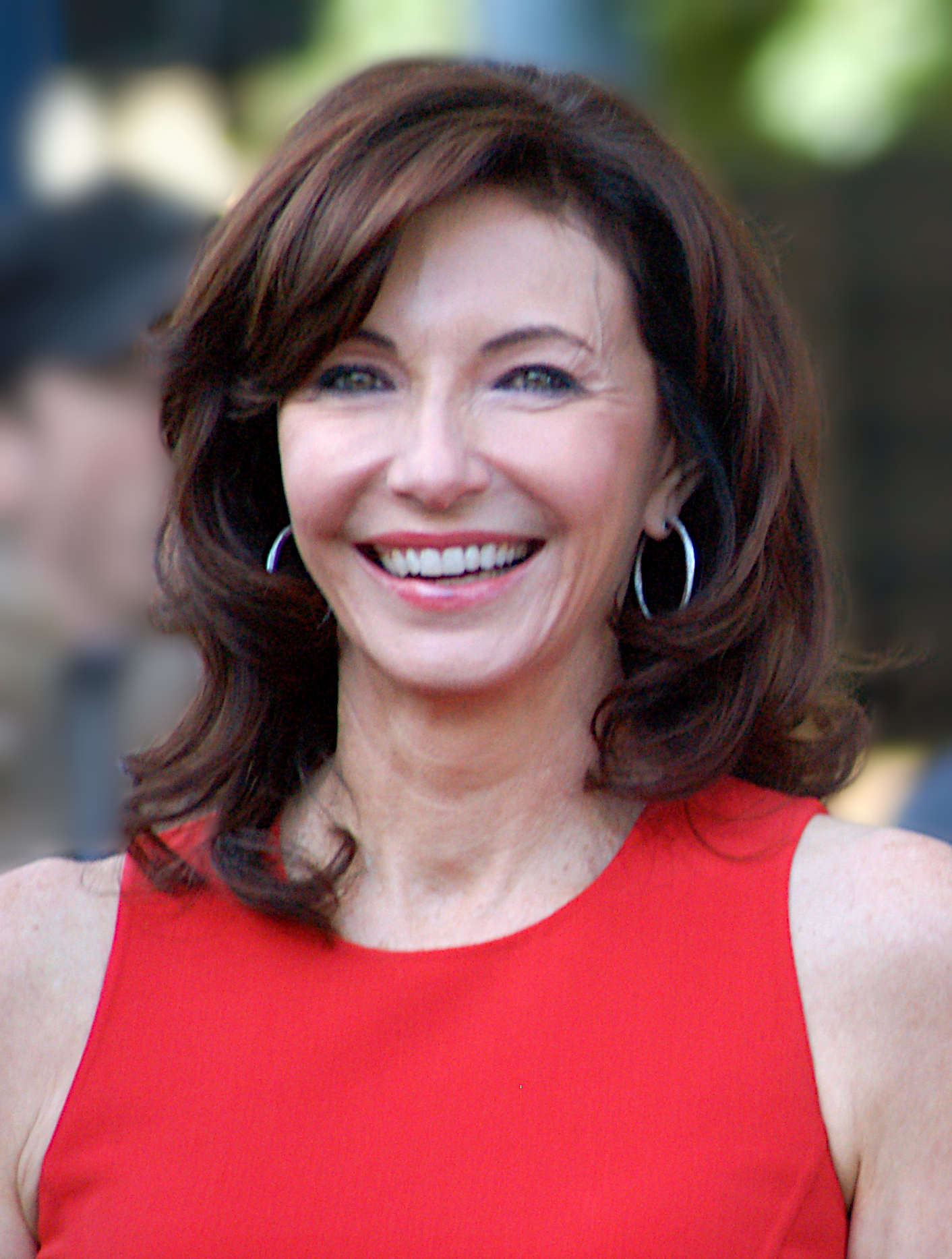
Mary Steenburgen portrays Diana Jessup, Avery's mother

Diana Jessup (Mary Steenburgen) is Avery's mother and Jack's mother-in-law. Diana shares many qualities with her daughter, which makes Jack instantly attracted to her.

Appears in: "Hey, Baby, What's Wrong", "Kidnapped by Danger", "Queen of Jordan 2: Mystery of the Phantom Pooper", "What Will Happen to the Gang Next Year?".

=== Sylvia Rossitano ===
Sylvia Rossitano (Patti LuPone) is Frank's mother. Sylvia is a stereotypical Italian-American mother, extremely loving towards her son, but also incredibly overbearing. Sylvia is also an incredible cook.

Appears in: "Goodbye, My Friend", "The Moms", "Alexis Goodlooking and the Case of the Missing Whisky".

=== Paula Hornberger ===
Paula Hornberger (Paula Pell) is Pete's wife. Paula and Pete have been married since their second year of college, after Paula was pregnant with the pair's first child 20 minutes into their first date. Paula and Pete have a seemingly tenuous relationship, as Pete lived with Liz after he lied about his vasectomy. The two reconnected after engaging in a post-marital affair.

Appears in: "Greenzo", "Kidney Now!", "Season 4", "I Do Do", "The Fabian Strategy", "Hogcock!" / "Last Lunch"

== Recurring characters ==
=== Leo Spaceman ===
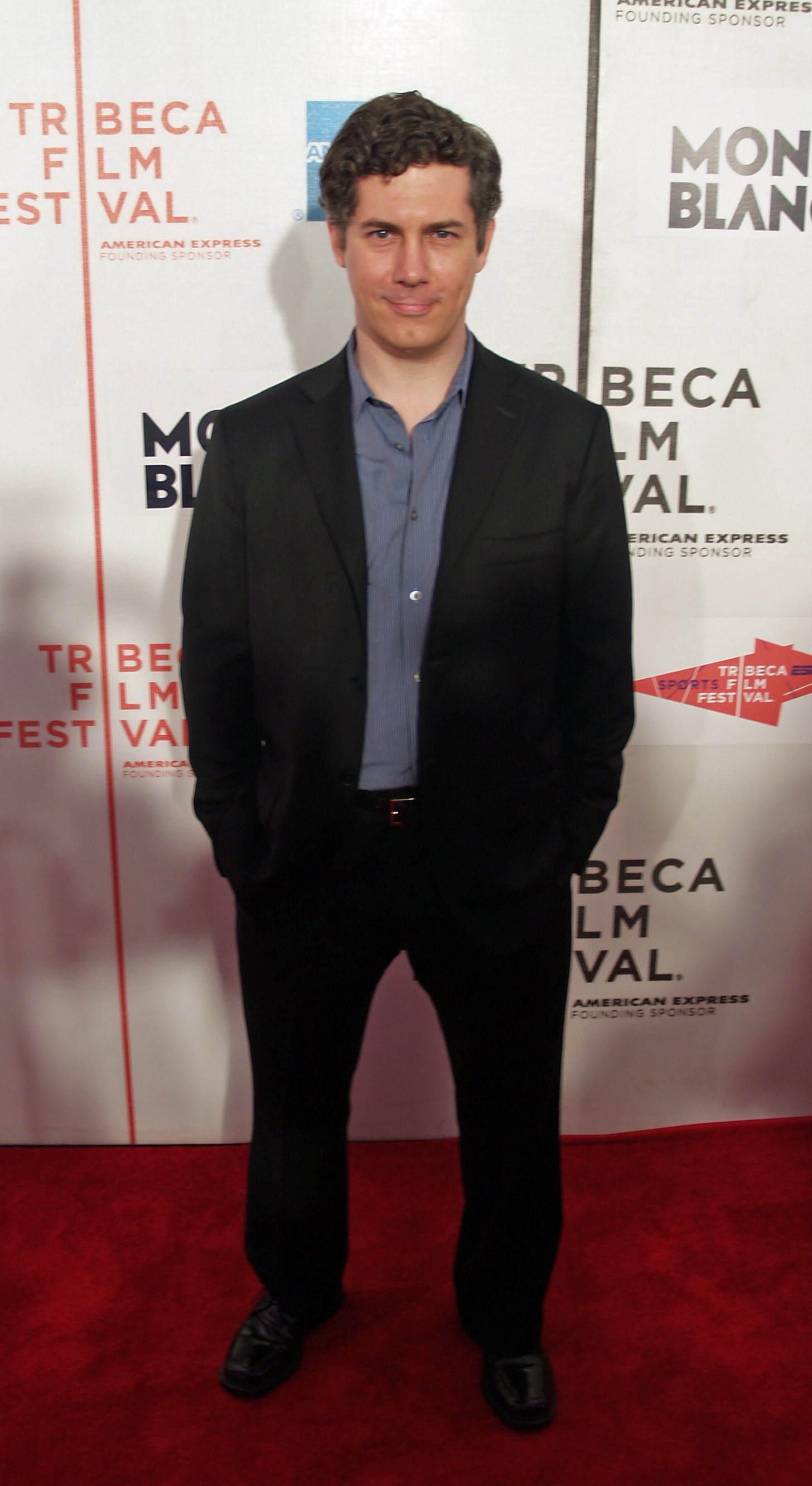
Chris Parnell portrays Leo Spaceman

"Dr." Leo Spaceman (/spəˈtʃɛmɪn/ spə-CHEM-in—except by Tracy, who pronounces his name like the English word "spaceman") (Chris Parnell) is a graduate of the Ho Chi Minh City School of Medicine. He is a quack who practices questionable medicine, such as giving a "medical professional's seal of approval" to a defective "meat machine", and as such is legally required to put quotation marks around his title. Despite his obvious shortcomings, Jack is unwavering in his support of Spaceman's "skills". He wrote a bestselling book, The Cigarette Diet, and found shocking medical abnormalities during Desert Storm which his boss refused to report to his superior, Saddam Hussein. At one time Spaceman dated Lynette "Squeaky" Fromme, whom he described as "difficult". Leo has been portrayed as a classic "quack", doing and saying weird things. For instance, when Jack Donaghy visits him for a checkup in "Hiatus", Spaceman instructs Jack to cough several times while seeming to examine him below the frame (implying a hernia inspection), but afterward says, "Okay, let's start the examination." In his last appearance on the series, he is appointed Surgeon General of the United States, and breaks the fourth wall by saying "That's a series wrap on Leo Spaceman, suckers!".

Leo is the son of Dr. Harold (a.k.a. Heinrich) Spaceman, an equally incompetent and unethical physician. After serving in World War II, the elder Dr. Spaceman left Germany for a new life in the United States. In the 1950s, he was a television spokesman for Chatterton cigarettes, promoting their tar and nicotine to expectant mothers, as being necessary for their babies' skeletal development. In addition to his Nazi past, he was a notorious paedophile.

Appears in: "Tracy Does Conan", "The Baby Show", "The Rural Juror", "Fireworks", "Hiatus", "Jack Gets in the Game", "Succession", "Flu Shot", "Retreat to Move Forward", "The Funcooker", "Kidney Now!", "Sun Tea", "Dealbreakers Talk Show#0001", "When It Rains, It Pours", "Live Show", "Mrs. Donaghy", "100", "Respawn", "Hey, Baby, What's Wrong", "Nothing Left to Lose", "Live from Studio 6H", "Mazel Tov, Dummies!", "Game Over", Dr. Pepper commercials.

=== Lenny Wosniak ===
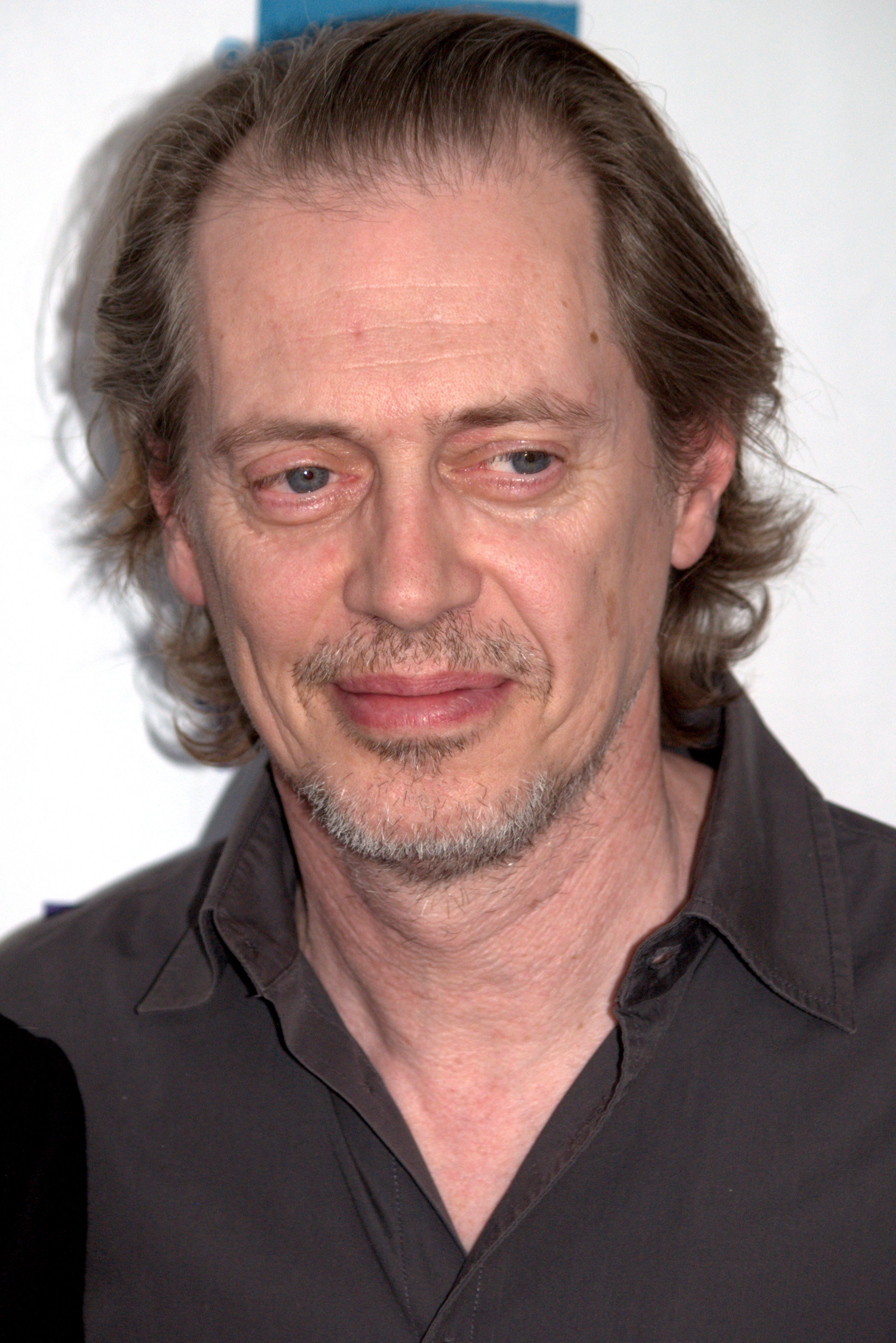
Steve Buscemi portrays Lenny Wosniak

Lenny Wosniak (Steve Buscemi) is a private investigator occasionally hired by Jack. He first appears in the second-season episode "The Collection", where (while spying on Jack to determine if he has any skeletons in his closet which could prevent him from being named the new CEO of General Electric) he discovers Jack has a large collection of homemade ceramic cookie jars. Jack also hires him in the third season to obtain personal information about a man his mother was seeing, and (later) the true identity of his father. In "The Tuxedo Begins", Jack hires him after he is mugged. During his investigations, Wosniak will occasionally don a disguise as he sees fit. He claims he was once "part of a special task force of very young-looking cops who infiltrated high schools", in a reference to 21 Jump Street. While attempting to infiltrate the pages union by seducing Kenneth, Wosniak affixes a blond wig to assume the persona of the "nympho-coed Charlene LaRue"- the attempt ultimately fails as Kenneth was "impervious" to Mrs. LaRue's charms. In "Game Over" Lenny goes undercover at Kaylie Hooper's high school as a female drama teacher, Jan Foster, discovers that he prefers being Jan to being Lenny, and gets engaged to a female math teacher.

Appears in: "The Collection", "The Natural Order", "Mamma Mia", "Season 4", "The Tuxedo Begins" and "Game Over".

=== Shawn Connelly ===
Shawn Connelly (Seth Kirschner) directs Tracy Jordan in Garfield 3: Feline Groovy until Tracy abruptly quits and causes the production to be shut down. His career ruined, Shawn is forced to move back into his parents' home. He again finds himself directing Tracy in an advertisement for the Boys & Girls Clubs, each elaborate take of which is ruined by Tracy's incompetence, until Jack Donaghy arrives on-set, feeds Tracy a mouth-full of jelly beans, and imitates his voice. Jack twice hires Shawn to direct films he executive produces and which star Jenna Maroney. The first is the Phil Rosenthal-penned family-friendly horror-torture soft-core porn film, Take My Hand promoting Stamford, Connecticut. He follows that up with the docudrama Liz Lemon wrote about Jack's wife's North Korean abduction: Kidnapped by Danger: The Avery Jessup Story, brought to you with limited interruptions by Pride bladder control pads. Pride: make every room a bathroom. Shawn discovers Jenna Maroney to be just as horrible to deal with as Tracy was, when he tries to direct her in an episode of Law & Order: Special Victims Unit after TGS is cancelled.

Appears in: "Into the Crevasse", "Emanuelle Goes to Dinosaur Land", "Reaganing", "I Heart Connecticut", "Kidnapped by Danger", "Hogcock!"

=== Bev ===
Bev (Megan Mullally) is Liz Lemon's (later, Liz and Criss Chross's) adoption agent. She initially intends to reject Liz at the conclusion of her evaluation visit to Liz's workplace, many of the interviews of Liz's co-workers having reflected badly upon Liz or the safety of the studio for a child. Before Bev files her report, however, she sustains a head injury and forgets that she has conducted the evaluation. Liz gets the crew to help her "do over" the evaluation, hoping for a better result.

Although Liz's marriage to Criss was calculated to increase her chance at adopting, Bev explains that there remains a four-year waiting list for newborns and tries to convince Liz to adopt an older child. Liz eventually agrees after realising that years of dealing with her "problem children" Tracy and Jenna have proven her parenting skills. Bev subsequently convinces Liz to accept twins rather than a single child and schedules their arrival for a few short days later. She gets the date wrong, however, and informs Criss that Terry and Janet are flying in that afternoon.

Appears in: "Do-Over", "Game Over", "Florida", "A Goon's Deed in a Weary World"

=== Cooter Burger (James Riley) ===
James "Cooter Burger" Riley (Matthew Broderick) is a government employee and political lobbyist. He first met Jack in the declining Bush administration where together they collaborated to be fired by developing a "Gay Bomb". Years later, Cooter works as a Republican political lobbyist and tries to persuade Jack to have TGS make more sketches about Mitt Romney's fictional new running mate, Governor Dunston. Cooter's real name is James Riley; "Cooter Burger" is a combination of two nicknames given to him by George W. Bush.

Appears in: "Cooter", "Governor Dunston".

=== Simon Barrons ===
Simon Barrons (Josh Fadem) is Liz's young, meek, enfeebled, low-level talent agent, who usually dresses in a comically oversized suit. He mostly represents animals (bragging at one point about how one of his clients inspired a character on the show Wonder Pets!) and proves to be completely useless in helping Liz plan for her post-TGS career. Liz eventually and rightly fires him, and his efforts to be re-hired fail, as do his efforts to finally pass the New York bar exam.

Appears in: "The Problem Solvers", "Plan B", "Today You Are a Man".

=== Donald ===
Donald (Michael Benjamin Washington) is an entrepreneur who pretends to be Tracy Jordan's son (despite being two years older than Tracy). His money-making ideas consist of questionable business practices, such as picking out corporate names already in use (a frozen-yogurt and microbrewery restaurant called Microsoft, and a phone service for nationwide air-quality updates called American Airlines). Tracy knows Donald is not his son; he supports his misguided ideas anyway, and Jack (who had convinced Tracy to cut Donald off) later tells Tracy to keep being a dad. Donald opens a karate dojo named for Tracy, but the business fails. He also tries to solicit Jack for an investment in a new restaurant.

Appears in: "Mamma Mia", "Chain Reaction of Mental Anguish".

=== Lynn Onkman ===
Lynn Onkman (Susan Sarandon) is Frank's girlfriend and former high school teacher. Lynn seduced Frank when he was 14 years old and they became lovers. Lynn was eventually arrested and sent to jail. Lynn was released years later and reunited with Frank on an episode of Angie's reality show Queen of Jordan. Lynn and Frank broke up after an argument in which Lynn said that Frank still hadn't grown up, however, Lynn and Frank made up and continued their relationship. Frank's mother Sylvia heavily disapproved of Frank and Lynn's relationship, causing them to break up again. Liz was able to convince Sylvia to approve of Frank and Lynn's relationship when Sylvia sees Lynn's passion towards Frank, and so the two of them got back together. Despite Liz's help with Lynn and Frank's relationship, Lynn hates Liz, and has said that she believes Liz is a "terrible person". Lynn is also part of a Mexican prison gang named Los Tiburones.

Appears in: "Queen of Jordan (30 Rock)", "Alexis Goodlooking and the Case of the Missing Whisky".

=== Minor characters ===
The following is a supplementary list of recurring characters—including those appearing briefly in multiple episodes, such as a regularly appearing writer—about whom little is known.

- Gabe Person (Seth Baird) – Replaces Jonathan as Jack's assistant during season 6 and several episodes of season 7. His most prominent appearance is in "Grandmentor", where he is dismissed by Jack as being nothing more than a "featured extra with no lines" after attempting to gain the lead role in the film Kidnapped by Danger.
- Lee (Tom Broecker) – The show's costume manager; appears in eleven episodes. Broecker is the real-world costume designer for 30 Rock.
- Stage manager (Teddy Coluca) – Appears in six episodes.
- Tracy Davids (Tracy Davids) – The stage manager's assistant; appears in two episodes. He yells at her when she can not move quick enough ("stage manager").
- D'Fwan (Tituss Burgess) – A flamboyantly gay member of Angie Jordan's entourage. Appears in four episodes.
- Rachel Baze (Rachel Hamilton) – One of the writers on the show; in "The Aftermath", Jack mentions her last name and that she just became engaged. She has speaking parts in two episodes. She appears often in the writers room during the first two seasons, but disappears after season 2.
- Anthony (Anthony Atamanuik) – One of the writers on the show; speaks in the final show.
- Donald (Donald Glover) – A stagehand on the show; has a speaking part in two episodes. Glover, a writer for 30 Rock, also briefly appears as a gay student graduating from Tracy Jordan's alma mater Frank Lucas High School when Jordan gives a commencement address in "Kidney Now!"
- Matt (Matt Dickinson) – Jack's assistant in two season-one episodes and one season-three episode (in place of Jonathan)
- Stage manager (Brendan Walsh) – Shouts "Shut it down!" at the end of each of the two episodes he appears in (referred to in credits as "Shut It Down").
- Alfonso Mysterioso/TGS Piano Player (Jeff Richmond) – Jenna's pianist. He appears in "Ludachristmas" and "Christmas Special". Richmond also appeared in "The Aftermath" and "St. Valentine's Day." He also appears as the TGS piano player in the first-season episode "The Baby Show". Richmond is the real-world primary composer on 30 Rock and Tina Fey's husband. His last name is called out when he is fired from Jenna's talent show (Hey, Baby, What's Wrong).
- Richard Esposito (Himself) – Jenna's hairstylist. He is long-suffering at the hands of Jenna's antics. They have an antagonistic relationship.
- Tim Grandy (Kevin Miller) – One of the writers on the show; in "The Aftermath", Jack mentions he is from Bowie, Maryland. He has a brief speaking part in "The C Word".
- Grace Park (Charlyne Yi) – An NBC page who has a slight romantic history with Kenneth. Appeared in "The C Word".
- Hannibal (Hannibal Buress) – A homeless man who seems to appear at moments most inconvenient to Liz and her staff. Buress was a writer for 30 Rock in seasons 5–6. He appears in "Chain Reaction of Mental Anguish", "Operation Righteous Cowboy Lightning", "TGS Hates Women", "Plan B", "100", "Respawn", "The Tuxedo Begins", "Leap Day" and "Queen of Jordan 2: Mystery of the Phantom Pooper".
- Moonvest (Craig Castaldo) – A homeless man who wears a vest with crescent moons on it. He appears in "The Head and the Hair", "Audition Day", and "I Do Do". His name is a reference to Leslie Moonves (president of NBC's competitor CBS Corporation) to whom the NBC executives assume Kenneth is referring, and avant-garde street musician Moondog.
- Sketch-Tron 6000 A recurring TGS robot sketch character originally from outer space, he appears in skits like "The Bear and Robot Talk Show", flashback dreams by Tracy Jordan, vice presidential debate skits, as well as simple background appearances behind major characters or on stage for TGS rehearsals in nine episodes over the show's 7 seasons. He appears in "Blind Date", Episode 210, "Cutbacks", "Live Show", "¡Qué Sorpresa!", "100", "The Beginning of the End", "Governor Dunston", and "A Goon's Deed in a Weary World". A Sketch-Tron 6000 fan site shows all appearances he made on the show.
- Brian Williams (himself) – He has made a number of cameo appearances as (an exaggerated) version of himself, portrayed as clueless and trying too hard to be funny. He also appeared as David Brinkley in the West Coast broadcast of "Live from Studio 6H".
- Sherry (Adriane Lenox) – Liddy's Trinidadian nanny who proves to be a powerful negotiator against Jack. She appears in "It's Never Too Late for Now", "Everything Sunny All the Time Always", "Respawn" and "Leap Day".
- Male Newscaster (Jonathan Dickson) – The guy Tina Fey (Liz Lemon) gets her news from when she's down South and sick in bed. He appears in Stone Mountain

== Guest characters ==
30 Rock has featured a number of guest appearances (including cameos and featured fictional roles):

- Clay Aiken as himself; revealed to be the cousin of Kenneth Parcell.
- Buzz Aldrin as himself (former lover of Liz's mother, Margaret Lemon (then Freeman), to whom she "repeatedly lost her virginity" while Waldo, the town pervert, watched from the bushes)
- Harry Anderson as himself
- Jennifer Aniston as Claire Harper (a wild college friend of Jenna and Liz)
- Fred Armisen as Raheem Haddad (Liz's new neighbor, whom she believes is a terrorist)
- William Baldwin as Lance Drake Mandrell, an actor who portrays Jack in the television movie "Kidnapped by Danger".
- Sara Bareilles as herself
- The Beastie Boys as themselves
- Joy Behar as herself
- Richard Belzer as himself portraying Sergeant John Munch
- Tony Bennett as himself
- Mary J. Blige as herself
- Michael Bloomberg as himself
- Nick Cannon as himself
- Jim Carrey as himself portraying the lead in Leap Day Williams
- James Carville as himself
- Don Cheadle as himself
- Anna Chlumsky as Liz Lemler, Floyd's former girlfriend.
- John Cho as Lorne, a crystal meth smuggler
- Margaret Cho as Kim Jong-il and Kim Jong-un.
- Gary Cole as Roger
- Tim Conway as Bucky Bright (an idol of Kenneth's who turns out to be a prejudiced, bisexual, womanizer; he points himself (Conway) out in a McHale's Navy publicity photo). Conway won an Emmy for the episode.
- Elvis Costello as himself
- Bryan Cranston as Ron, Kenneth's step-father
- Sheryl Crow as herself
- Ann Curry as herself
- Robert De Niro as himself
- Jeff Dunham and Bubba J as Rick Wayne and his dummy Pumpkin respectively (whom Jack finds hilarious and demands that he be hired over Liz's objections—until Pumpkin insults Liz and is then killed by Jack).
- Steve Earle as himself
- Jimmy Fallon as himself/a young Jack Donaghy in "Live from Studio 6H"
- Will Ferrell as the lead in Bitch Hunter, a made-up NBC show about the main character, played by Ferrell, who hunts bitches.
- Carrie Fisher as Rosemary Howard (a book author and Liz's girlhood idol, who has become mentally unstable)
- Mick Foley as his wrestling persona Mankind
- James Franco as himself
- Ina Garten as herself
- Ghostface Killah as himself
- Paul Giamatti as Ritchie
- Kathie Lee Gifford as herself
- Alan Gilbert and members of the New York Philharmonic as themselves
- Whoopi Goldberg as herself
- Al Gore as himself
- Kelsey Grammer as himself/a member of the "Best Friends Gang" who steal from Carvel
- Bill Hader as Kevin, Carol's co-pilot
- Tom Hanks as himself
- Sean Hayes as Jesse Parcell, Kenneth's cousin
- Florence Henderson as herself
- Edward Herrmann as Walter, a co-op board member (Episode 210, 2008)
- Lester Holt as himself
- Ice-T as himself portraying Detective Odafin Tutuola
- Norah Jones as herself
- Jon Bon Jovi as himself
- Kim Kardashian as herself
- Stacy Keach as himself
- Michael Keaton as Tom, an NBC maintenance man.
- Kermit the Frog as himself
- Gayle King as herself
- Larry King as himself
- Calvin Klein as himself
- Gladys Knight as herself
- John Krasinski as himself
- Karolina Kurkova as herself
- Talib Kweli as himself
- Padma Lakshmi as herself
- Nathan Lane as Eddie Donaghy, Jack's brother
- Matt Lauer as himself
- Cyndi Lauper as herself
- Adam Levine as himself
- John Lithgow as himself
- LL Cool J as hip-hop mogul Ridikolous
- Ryan Lochte as himself
- Julia Louis-Dreyfus as Liz Lemon in cutaway flashbacks in the "Live Show"
- Kellan Lutz as a fictional version of himself who is J.D. Lutz's grand-nephew. (Note: Kellan and John Lutz are not related in real life.)
- Patti LuPone as Sylvia Rossitano (Frank's mother)
- Andie MacDowell as herself portraying Claire Williams in Leap Dave Williams
- Rachel Maddow as herself
- Steve Martin as Gavin Volure
- Paul McCartney as himself
- Michael McDonald as himself
- John McEnroe as himself
- Tim Meadows as Martin Lutherking, an NBC lawyer.
- Rhett Miller as himself
- Vanessa Minnillo as Carmen Chao, a news anchor and Avery's rival.
- Andrea Mitchell as herself
- Conan O'Brien as himself
- Catherine O'Hara as Pearline, Kenneth's mother.
- Suze Orman as herself
- Nancy Pelosi as herself
- Aubrey Plaza as an NBC page (a job she once held in real life)
- Amy Poehler as a young Liz Lemon
- Markie Post as herself
- Queen Latifah as Congresswoman Regina Bookman
- Alysia Reiner as a Real Estate agent in "Sun Tea"
- Rob Reiner as Congressman Rob Reiner, a fictional version of himself
- Paul Reubens as Prince Gerhardt, a fictional member of the Habsburg line with various disabilities
- Denise Richards as herself
- Andy Richter as Mitch Lemon, Liz's brother
- Rob Riggle as Reggie
- Al Roker as himself
- Andy Samberg as himself
- Amy Schumer as Liz Lemon's stylist in the episode "Mamma Mia"
- David Schwimmer as Jared, an actor hired to play "Greenzo", a global warming mascot
- Amy Sedaris as Visor Lady
- Jerry Seinfeld as himself (to discuss SeinfeldVision)
- Molly Shannon as Katherine Catherine Donaghy, Jack's Sister
- Reshma Shetty as a Party Attendant in "Secrets and Lies"
- John Slattery as Steve Austin, an independent congressional candidate whom Jack endorses
- Aaron Sorkin as himself
- Octavia Spencer as herself
- Emma Stone as herself
- Daniel Sunjata as Chris
- Stanley Tucci as Henry Warren, an old colleague of Jack
- Meredith Vieira as herself in two episodes, and mentioned as a sexual predator of Kenneth in another
- Oprah Winfrey as Liz Lemon's hallucination of Oprah Winfrey
- Jack Welch as himself
- Adam West as himself
- Betty White as herself; Tracy attempts to call and scare her to death, but fails
- Wendy Williams as herself
- "Weird" Al Yankovic as himself
- Rachael Yamagata as herself
