= Gentleman's Intermission =

- 30 Rock episode
- Episode no.: Season 5 Episode 6
- Directed by: Don Scardino
- Written by: John Riggi
- Production code: 506
- Original air date: November 4, 2010

Guest appearances
- Elizabeth Banks as Avery Jessup; Ann Curry as herself; Buck Henry as Dick Lemon; Lester Holt as himself; Meredith Vieira as herself

Episode chronology
← Previous "Reaganing"	Next → "Brooklyn Without Limits"
- 30 Rock season 5

"Gentleman's Intermission" is the sixth episode of the fifth season of the American television comedy series 30 Rock, and the 86th overall episode of the series. It was written by co-executive producer John Riggi and directed by series producer Don Scardino. The episode originally aired on NBC in the United States on November 4, 2010. Elizabeth Banks and Buck Henry guest star in this episode, and there are cameo appearances by Ann Curry, Lester Holt, and Meredith Vieira.

In the episode, Avery Jessup (Banks) becomes suspicious of the relationship her fiancé Jack Donaghy (Alec Baldwin) has with his employee and friend Liz Lemon (Tina Fey), so she orders Jack to set boundaries in their friendship. This proves a problem for Liz when her father, Dick Lemon (Henry) arrives in town on a break from his marriage. Meanwhile, actor Tracy Jordan (Tracy Morgan) is upset when he discovers that his pre-recorded NBC obituary shows him to have done nothing worthwhile in his life, and Jenna Maroney (Jane Krakowski) learns that she doesn't have an obituary so decides to make a video of her own.

The episode received generally good reviews from television critics, especially in regard to guest star Buck Henry. According to Nielsen Media Research, "Gentleman's Intermission" was watched by 5.311 million viewers during its original broadcast and received a 2.4 rating/7 share among adults aged 18–49.

== Plot ==
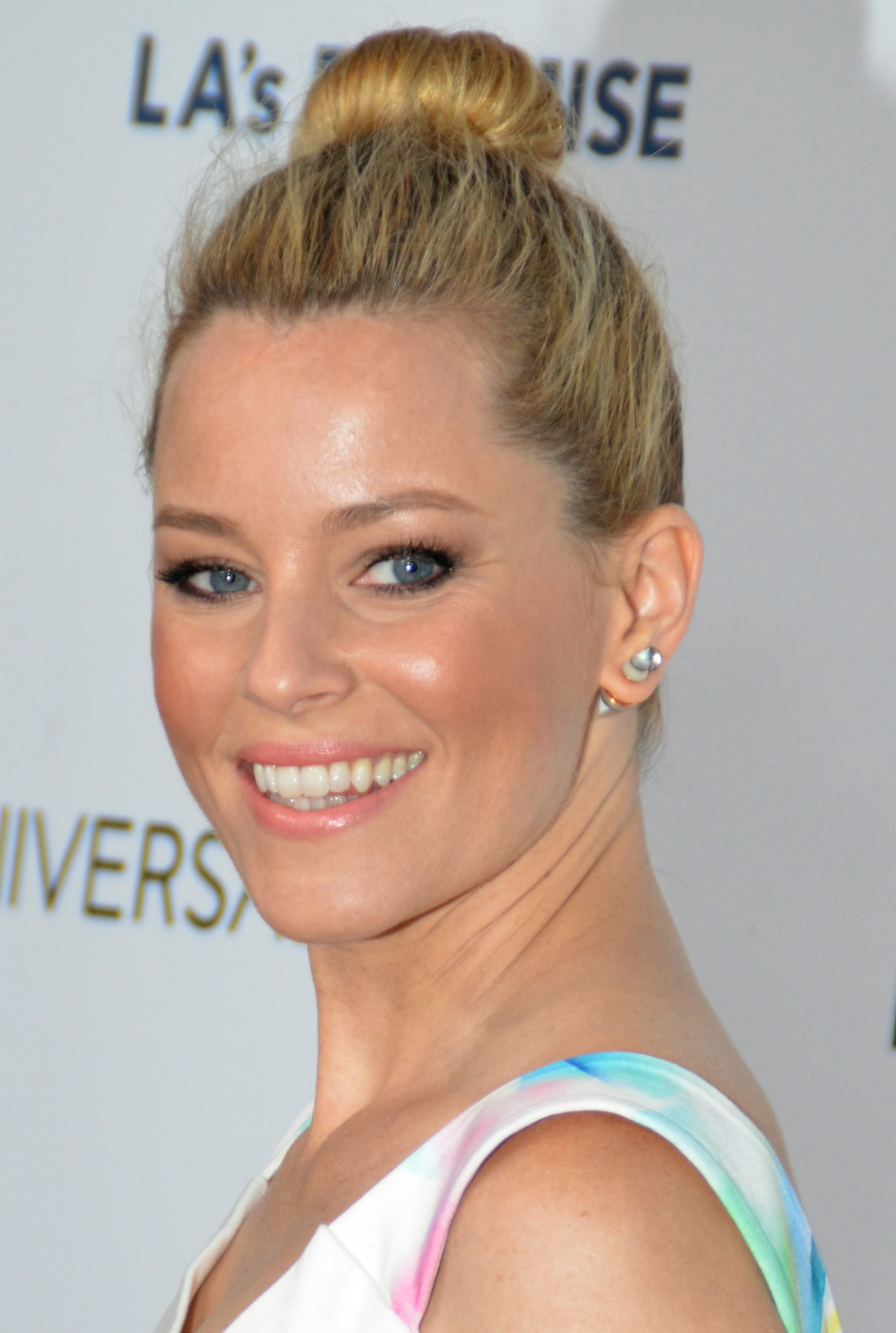
Elizabeth Banks guest starred in "Gentleman's Intermission" as Avery Jessup, who points out the strange nature of Liz and Jack's relationship

Jack Donaghy (Alec Baldwin) and Avery Jessup (Elizabeth Banks) are trying to decide what to name their soon-to-be-born-daughter. However, when Avery suggests naming the baby Charlotte, Jack declines, saying that his employee and mentee Liz Lemon (Tina Fey) knew somebody called Charlotte in middle school and did not like her. This annoys Avery, who is concerned about the nature of Jack's relationship with Liz and tells him that he needs to put some boundaries in place. Despite Jack's argument that Liz is his mentee and that he does not choose such people lightly, Avery demands that he starts treating Liz like his other employees. Despite this, Liz finds she cannot resist calling Jack for advice and pretends to be German when Avery answers Jack's phone.

Meanwhile, Liz has her own problems when her father, Dick Lemon (Buck Henry), calls her to say that he is coming to visit her in New York, but will not be bringing his wife and Liz's mother, Margaret Lemon (Anita Gillette), with him. When he shows up at her apartment, he reveals that he and her mother are on a break. Liz, however, believes that he is just pretending that there are problems with his marriage and that he is actually in town for a "gentleman's intermission", so she refuses to let him stay with her. Unfortunately, her attempts to turn to Jack for help are thwarted by Avery, who is insistent that she work out her own problems instead of always coming to Jack.

At the 30 Rock studios, NBC page Kenneth Parcell (Jack McBrayer) is shocked when he discovers a group of editors putting together an obituary for actor Tracy Jordan (Tracy Morgan). However, he is calmed when they inform him that it is simply a routine procedure that NBC carries out for some of its more famous stars. Kenneth decides to show the obituary to Tracy himself, who, far from being pleased, laments the way that his legacy looks on television and declares that he does not want to be remembered the way he is. TGS co-star Jenna Maroney (Jane Krakowski) finds out about Tracy's obituary and is upset that one has not been made for her, so she decides to record one herself.

It transpires that both Liz and Jack have trouble functioning properly without each other—Liz is used to Jack helping her to deal with her personal life and work problems and struggles to cope on her own, while Jack finds that there is a void in his life without his mentee, and attempts to find somebody else to take Liz's place. Ultimately, after trying out his assistant Jonathan, Tracy, Jenna, and Avery herself, Jack realizes that only Liz can be his mentee. Eventually, Avery realizes that there is nothing untoward about Jack's friendship with Liz and reunites the pair, saying that they both need the relationship. Jack is able to quickly sort out Liz's problem with her father by calling him and pretending to be the angry boyfriend of one of the women he has picked up while in town.

Meanwhile, Tracy formulates a plan to make his legacy better—a masked Kenneth will pretend to attack a cat with a hammer, at which point Tracy will come to the rescue with a katana. However, this plan goes wrong when Tracy hears that his film Hard To Watch is likely to win him an Oscar and becomes distracted, partially because of the news and partially because he suddenly remembers that he left his son in Atlantic City. Instead, Jenna unwittingly ends up saving the cat and taking all the credit, managing to improve her own legacy after all.

== Production ==
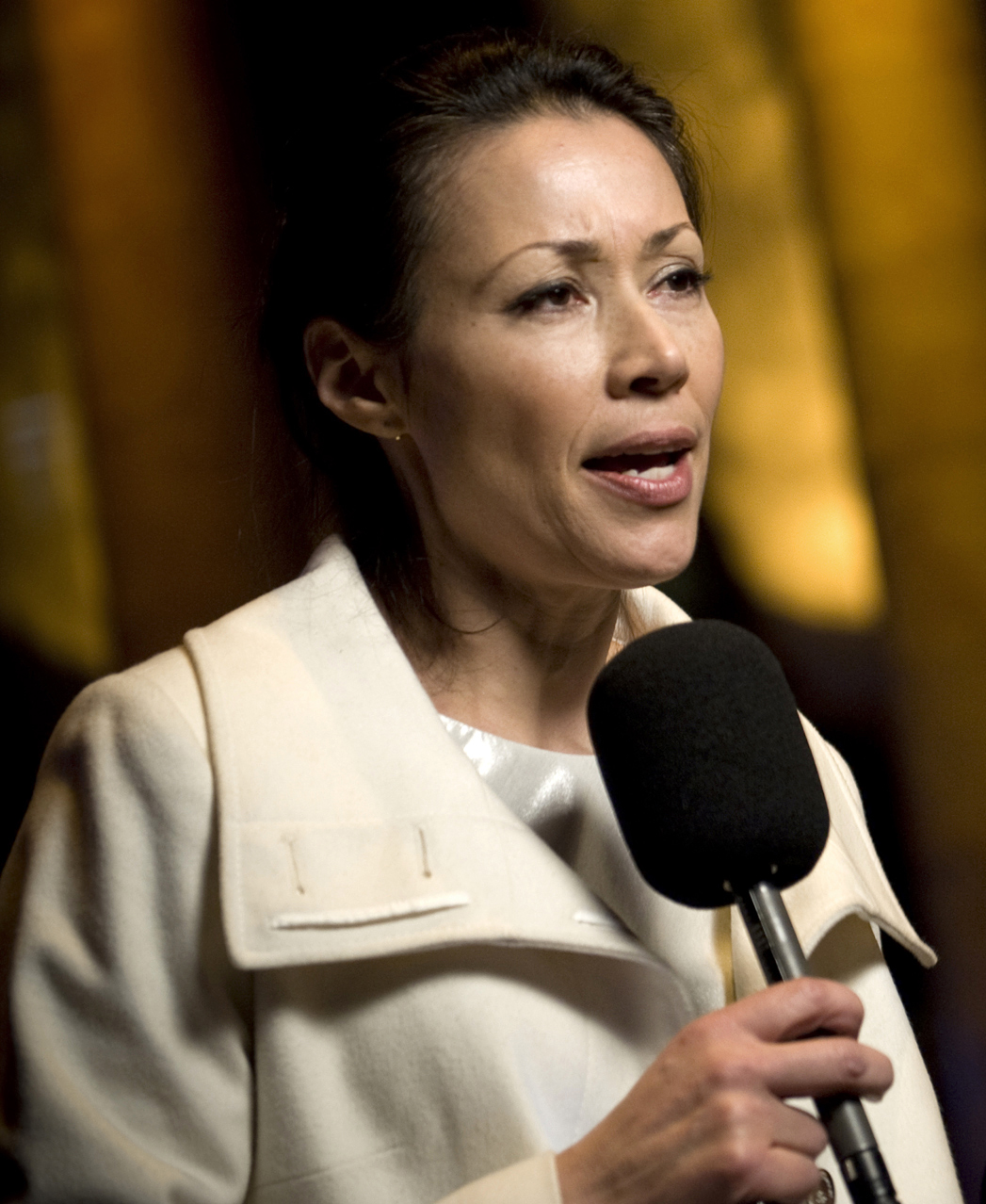
Ann Curry appeared in the episode, announcing that Tracy Jordan's film Hard To Watch would likely win an Oscar

"Gentleman's Intermission" was written by co-executive producer John Riggi and directed by series producer Don Scardino. This was Riggi's ninth writing credit, and Scardino's twenty-ninth helmed episode. "Gentleman's Intermission" originally aired in the United States on November 4, 2010, on NBC as the sixth episode of the show's fifth season and the 86th overall episode of the series. This episode of 30 Rock was filmed on October 2, 2010.

Elizabeth Banks reprised her role in this episode as Avery Jessup, who calls into focus the strange nature of the relationship between Jack Donaghy and Liz Lemon. The unusual friendship between the pair has been a focus of much fan speculation, however Tina Fey, the series creator and lead actress on 30 Rock, had previously promised fans that she would never put them together, commenting: "They're never going to do it [...] I just think it's lazy, when you get to season five or season six [of a TV show] and everyone just starts doing it". Alec Baldwin, who plays Jack Donaghy, was asked if the two characters will ever hook-up, he responded "I sincerely doubt it, and I think the show is better off that way. Once they cross that line, all the tension goes out of those relationships. And I think the lesson we learned about both those characters is that they are married to their jobs and they are married to their work."

Actor/screenwriter Buck Henry made his second appearance as Dick Lemon, Liz's father. Henry played the role in the December 13, 2007, episode "Ludachristmas" which aired during the show's second season. This episode of 30 Rock featured cameo appearances from The Today Show correspondents Ann Curry, Meredith Vieira, and Lester Holt. "Gentleman's Intermission" was Vieira's fifth guest appearance as herself, having appeared in the episodes "Greenzo", "Larry King", "The Bubble", and "Floyd". This was Holt's fourth cameo on the show. In "Gentleman's Intermission", Tracy Jordan sees his eulogy with Holt reporting it. Holt appeared in the episodes "Cleveland", "Hiatus", and "Floyd". Curry reports that Tracy's movie Hard To Watch, a story of an inner-city boy living in the ghetto, is garnering Oscar buzz which makes Tracy happy. This was Curry's first appearance on 30 Rock. In addition, Tracy's fictitious film Hard To Watch was mentioned during this episode. The film originally appeared as part of the plot in the fourth season episode "Emanuelle Goes to Dinosaur Land".

== Cultural references ==
In one scene from the episode, Tracy tells Kenneth that when he dies he does not want to be known as an idiot millionaire. After saying this, Jenna enters Tracy's dressing room and asks if Mark Cuban is the idiot millionaire they are talking about and says that Cuban tried to run her over with a jet ski. Cuban is an entrepreneur and owner of the Dallas Mavericks, an NBA team. Later, Jenna says that she played Arts and Literature in the film version of Trivial Pursuit. The latter is a board game in which progress is determined by a player's ability to answer general knowledge and popular culture questions. In an earlier scene, Kenneth leads a tour into the editing suite and sees an obituary for Tracy on TV. Believing Tracy dead, he drops to his knees and loudly shouts, "I'm not done with him, Jacob! He stays on this side!" This is a reference to the Lost character of the same name. In another scene, Kenneth mentions that Tracy had starred in a production of Henry IV in Central Park, playing Prince Hal. However, he simply forgot all of his lines, loudly shouting "I don't know any of my lines!". When Liz is in disguise while talking to her father at the bar, she introduces herself as Dorothy Michaels, a reference to Dustin Hoffman's character in Tootsie.

== Reception ==
In its original American broadcast, this episode of 30 Rock drew in 5.311 million households, according to Nielsen Media Research. The show claimed a 2.4/7 share among viewers in the 18–49 demographic. This means that it was seen by 2.4 percent of all 18- to 49-year-olds, and 7 percent of all 18- to 49-year-olds watching television at the time of the broadcast. The figure was an increase over the previous episode, "Reaganing", which was seen by 5.182 million American viewers.

Juli Weiner for Vanity Fair wrote "This may have been our favorite episode of the season so far!" Weiner said that the main plot "didn't quite track." Johnny Firecloud of CraveOnline wrote that the episode was a strange one in the 30 Rock world "but the emotional component that actually makes us care about the status quo being threatened worked as planned. The uncle/niece-mentor/protégé bond between Jack and Liz was restored with minimal sentimentality, but the emotional weight was palpable between the two." The A.V. Club's Nathan Rabin was complimentary towards Buck Henry's role as Liz's father. "It helps that the two look like they could conceivably be products of the same sturdy/nerdy Midwestern gene pool, but iconically, it makes all the sense in the world." He was also very positive toward the episode, commenting that it "[had] the emotional component that separates a merely good 30 Rock episode from a pretty great one [...] and Liz and Jack's strange father/daughter mentor/protégé bond was reaffirmed with zero sentimentality but plenty of well-earned emotional resonance." Den of Geek writer Ian McDonald described Henry as "hilarity personified". He also went on to praise Jane Krakowski, commenting that "[she] certainly nails the insane act pitch-perfectly. It's kind of frightening how believably insane she can appear". Meredith Blake for the Los Angeles Times wrote "Pop culture would have us believe that most male-female friendships are destined to turn into romance by Season 5. Jack and Liz are the rare exception. Not only have they never 'gone there,' the very idea of anything other that a friendship seems, well, gross. They represent that rare thing in TV land: A completely platonic friendship between two heterosexual people."

Television columnist Alan Sepinwall for HitFix wrote that the Tracy/Kenneth/Jenna obituary subplot was "more hit-and-miss". Scott Eidler of The Cornell Daily Sun wrote that the Tracy and Jenna plots were "slightly less believable". Bob Sassone of TV Squad opined in his recap that the Jack and Avery characters will not last as Elizabeth Banks "is too busy to be on a sitcom every week, so you know that Jack and Avery are going to separate at some point." Sassone also added that the pregnancy story "complicates the plot a bit, so maybe she will stay on in some way." Sassone was positive towards Tracy's obituary story but disliked "Liz's dad getting tired of his 45-year marriage and wanting to go to clubs." He explained that Henry returning as Tina Fey's father and doing this plot "was, well, unnecessary."
