= Cougars (30 Rock) =

- 30 Rock episode
- Episode no.: Season 2 Episode 7
- Directed by: Michael Engler
- Written by: John Riggi
- Cinematography by: Vanja Černjul
- Production code: 206
- Original air date: November 29, 2007

Guest appearances
- Kevin Brown as Dot Com Slattery; Grizz Chapman as Grizz Griswold; Val Emmich as Jamie Hamilton; John Lutz as J.D. Lutz; Maulik Pancholy as Jonathan; Greg Scarnici as Gay Man #2 (Terence)

Episode chronology
← Previous "Somebody to Love"	Next → "Secrets and Lies"
- 30 Rock season 2

"Cougars" is the seventh episode of the second season of 30 Rock, and the twenty-eighth episode overall. It was written by co-executive producer John Riggi and directed by Michael Engler. Guest stars in this episode include Kevin Brown, Grizz Chapman, Val Emmich, John Lutz, Maulik Pancholy, and Greg Scarnici.

In this episode, Liz Lemon (played by Tina Fey) goes on a date with a young, twenty-year-old coffee delivery man named Jamie (Val Emmich). The date gets awkward due to the seventeen-year age difference between Liz and Jamie. This feeling escalates when Liz meets Jamie's mother (Laura Berrios). Jenna Maroney (Jane Krakowski) gets a younger boyfriend of her own. Frank Rossitano (Judah Friedlander) develops a crush on Jamie. Meanwhile, Jack Donaghy (Alec Baldwin) helps Tracy Jordan (Tracy Morgan) to coach a Little League Baseball team.

== Plot ==
Liz develops a crush on Jamie, the new twenty-year-old coffee delivery man, and after some initial hesitation, she agrees to go on a date with him. Before the date, Liz gets cold feet, but she is encouraged to attend by Jenna, who declares Liz a cougar, a term describing "hot older ladies pouncing on their young prey". Liz agrees and goes on a successful date with Jamie; the pair agree to go on a second date. Prior to this second date, Liz goes to Jamie's apartment only to discover that Jamie still lives with his mother, who looks exactly like Liz.

Frank begins to question his sexuality when he realizes that he has a crush on Jamie. He even tries, unsuccessfully, to rival Liz to go on a date with Jamie. Later, Frank realizes that the only man he is attracted to is Jamie and realizes that he's not gay after a night out at a gay nightclub.

In order to become a cougar herself, Jenna starts to date Aidan, a teenage freshman at New York University. Jenna breaks up with Aidan when he starts to annoy her by wearing heelies, playing portable video games and acting like Jenna is his mother.

After hitting a police officer's horse, Tracy is ordered to do community service. His assignment: coach the worst Little League Team (the team is 0 and 18) in New York's worst neighborhood, Knuckle Beach. Hoping to inspire the team, Jack agrees to help Tracy and he donates uniforms to the team on behalf of the Sheinhardt Wig Company (NBC's fictitious parent company, as mentioned in season one). Jack replaces Tracy with Kenneth Parcell (Jack McBrayer) because he realizes that even with the newfound inspiration from both Jack and Tracy, the team is still failing. The team begins to revolt when they find out that Tracy has been fired. To counter this, Jack forms a coalition with Tracy and they replace members of the team with Grizz and Dot Com (Grizz Chapman and Kevin Brown).

== Production ==
Scenes for this episodes were primarily filmed on October 5, 2007 at Silvercup Studios in Long Island City, Queens, New York. During the commercial breaks in this episode, commercials for American Express were aired featuring 30 Rock cast members, who were in character. These commercials featured Kenneth giving out "Secret Rodney" Christmas gifts to various other 30 Rock characters. The commercials were aired in order to deter viewers, who were viewing the episode with Digital Video Recorders, from fast-forwarding through the commercial break.

The title of this episode, "Cougars", refers to a phrase from pop culture. The word cougar means an "older women who dates younger men." In the episode, Jenna calls both herself and Liz "cougars" due to them both dating younger men. While speaking about his appearance on 30 Rock, Val Emmich, who played Jamie in this episode, said that he was initially "intimidated by [Tina Fey] more than anyone else [he'd] acted alongside." When asked if acting with Fey on 30 Rock taught him anything, he replied that he learnt "that normal people can be in this business." He described Fey as "witty, smart [and] sexy".

== Reception ==
"Cougars" was watched by 5.8 million viewers and it received a 2.5 rating and a 6 share in the 18–49 demographic. The 2.5 refers to 2.5% of all 18- to 49-year-olds in the U.S., and the 6 refers to 6% of all 18- to 49-year-olds watching television in the U.S. at the time of the broadcast. The episode ranked in first place, among men aged between 18–34, against all television being broadcast in the same timeslot. By comparison, CBS's Survivor: China was watched by 13.8 million viewers, a repeat of ABC's Ugly Betty was viewed by 6.5 million viewers and Fox's Are You Smarter Than A 5th Grader? was watched by 9.0 million viewers.

Bob Sassone of TV Squad felt that the best storyline was the one featuring Tracy and Jack because of the "Bush/Iraq metaphors and the sight of Alec Baldwin dressed as General MacArthur, standing beneath a 'Fun Accomplished' sign." Robert Canning of IGN thought that the best storyline of the episode was centered on Liz and Jamie, and rated the episode 8 out of 10. Matt Webb Mitovich of TV Guide wrote that this episode "had so many fun lines", and found himself "giggling, chuckling and LOLing like a fool". He liked "the 'cougars' storyline", saying it "was a lot of fun, because Liz is best when Liz is feeling awkward." Jeff Labrecque of Entertainment Weekly wrote that "Jenna's Amber Alert affair with the soda-drinking, Heelys-gliding teenager" was "priceless". He also compared the interplay between Frank and Jamie to the relationship between Michael Scott (Steve Carell) and Ryan Howard (B. J. Novak) of The Office.
