= TGS Hates Women =

- 30 Rock episode
- Episode no.: Season 5 Episode 16
- Directed by: Beth McCarthy-Miller
- Written by: Ron Weiner
- Production code: 516
- Original air date: February 24, 2011

Guest appearances
- Cristin Milioti as Abby Flynn / Grossman; Chloë Grace Moretz as Kaylie Hooper; Terrence Mann as Dr. Bob Ballard; Hannibal Buress as a homeless man

Episode chronology
← Previous "It's Never Too Late for Now"	Next → "Queen of Jordan"
- 30 Rock season 5

"TGS Hates Women" is the sixteenth episode of the fifth season of the American television comedy series 30 Rock, and the 96th overall episode of the series. It was written by co-executive producer Ron Weiner and directed by Beth McCarthy-Miller. The episode originally aired on NBC in the United States on February 24, 2011. Guest stars in this episode include Cristin Milioti and Chloë Grace Moretz.

In the episode, TGS with Tracy Jordan is accused of being misogynistic, so Liz Lemon (Tina Fey) hires a female writer, Abby Flynn (Cristin Milioti), in order to prove that it is not. However, she becomes frustrated when it turns out that Abby is provocative and extremely stereotypical. At the same time, Jack Donaghy (Alec Baldwin) formulates a plan to one day become the CEO of Kabletown, but to do that, he needs to eliminate his competition, the current CEO's granddaughter, Kaylie Hooper (Chloë Grace Moretz).

This episode of 30 Rock received generally positive reviews from television critics. According to Nielsen Media Research, "TGS Hates Women" was watched by 4.501 million viewers during its original broadcast, and received a 2.3 rating/6 share among viewers in the 18–49 demographic.

== Plot ==
A feminist blog entitled "Joan of Snark" accuses The Girlie Show with Tracy Jordan (TGS) of being misogynistic due to their lack of female writers and detracting, stereotypical portrayal of female characters. Liz Lemon (Tina Fey) takes the accusation to heart and begins to wonder if it is true when she remembers that the last show, in the absence of Tracy Jordan (Tracy Morgan), had focused entirely on Jenna Maroney (Jane Krakowski) getting her period in different guises, including those of Amelia Earhart and Hillary Clinton. In order to address the criticism, Liz decides to hire an up-and-coming comedian named Abby Flynn (Cristin Milioti), but becomes frustrated when Abby turns out to be an embarrassing, oversexualized stereotype. As a result, Liz seeks to uncover her real personality.

Meanwhile, Jack Donaghy (Alec Baldwin) plots to someday become the CEO of Kabletown, but in order to do that, he must first eliminate the competition: the current CEO's granddaughter, Kaylie Hooper (Chloë Grace Moretz). He decides to meet Kaylie, whereupon he discovers that she has little interest in following in her grandfather's footsteps, wanting instead to become a marine biologist. Jack further encourages her along this career path, even introducing her to Bob Ballard (Terrence Mann), the man who discovered the wreck of the Titanic. However, his efforts work against him, as he begins to yearn for his own childhood dreams of marine biology.

Both Liz's and Jack's respective plans backfire. Jack discovers that Kaylie has no interest in marine biology. She had, in fact, found out about his own interest by reading his autobiography, Jack Attack, and was attempting to use it against him in the same way he was trying to game her. Meanwhile, Liz discovers that Abby Flynn's real name is Abby Grossman after discovering a video of her doing authentic stand-up online. Liz then posts the video on "Joan of Snark", only to discover that the real reason Abby was hiding her identity is because her psychopath ex-husband is hunting her down. Soon after, Abby receives a package from her ex-husband, revealing he knows where she works. This causes a panicked Abby to rush out of the TGS writers room, screaming that Liz is a Judas to women everywhere.

== Cultural references ==
The blog "Joan of Snark" and its criticism of The Girlie Show (TGS) refers to Irin Carmon's June 23, 2010, Jezebel article "The Daily Show's Woman Problem" that criticized the hiring of model and former G4 co-host Olivia Munn as a Daily Show correspondent.

Abby Flynn/Abby Grossman says her ex-husband tried to run her over with her car after being electrocuted while watching Sleeping with the Enemy. Jenna says that she was cut out of this film (in real life, Jane Krakowski was cut out of Fatal Attraction). Afterwards, Abby receives a box that her ex suggests he will put her head into. He says he was electrocuted again while watching Se7en.

== Production ==
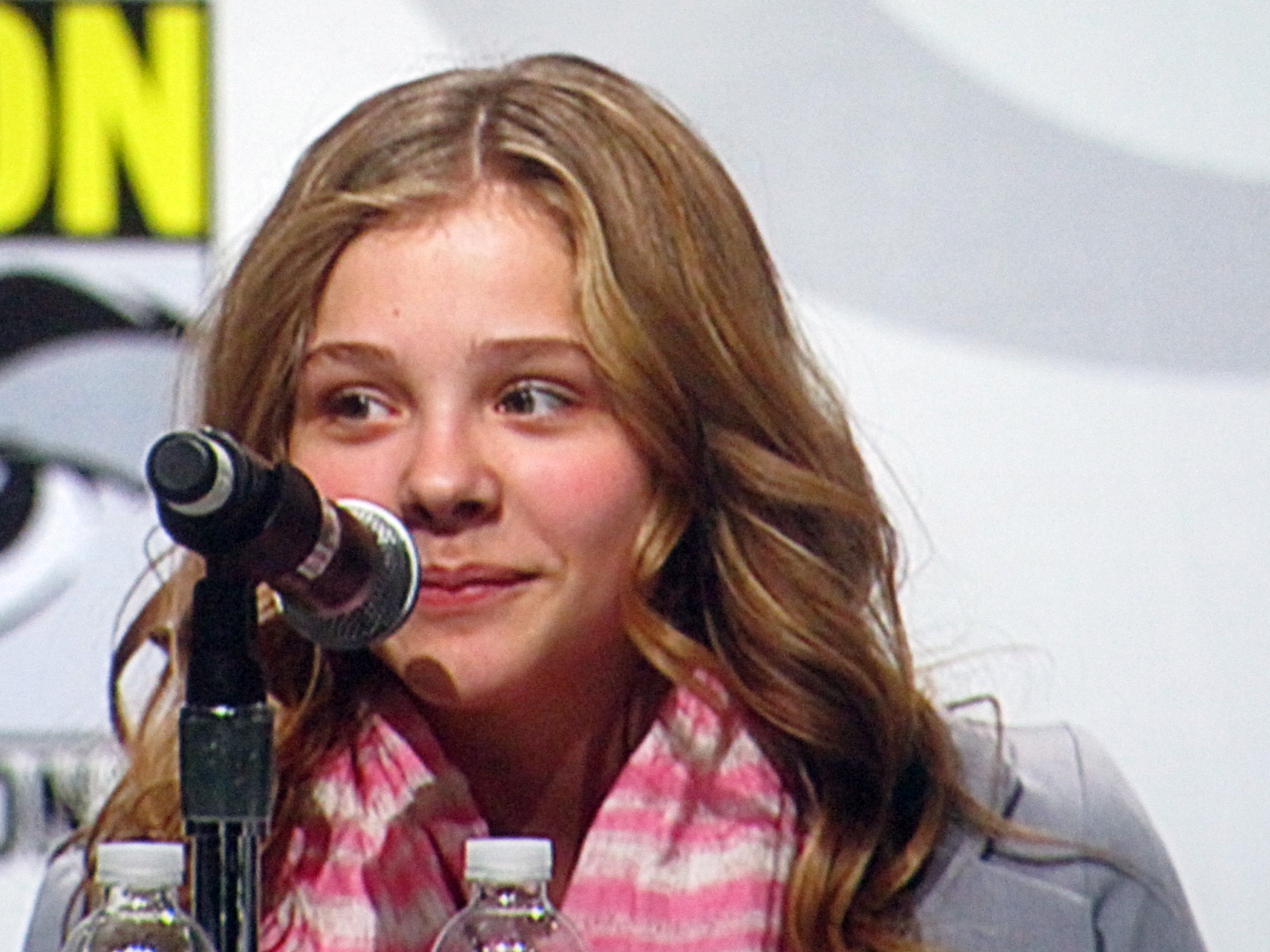
Chloë Grace Moretz guest starred in "TGS Hates Women" as Kaylee Hooper

This episode of 30 Rock was written by co-executive producer Ron Weiner and directed by Beth McCarthy Miller. This was Weiner's eighth writing credit, and McCarthy-Miller's twelfth directed episode. "TGS Hates Women" originally aired in the United States on February 24, 2011, on NBC as the sixteenth episode of the show's fifth season and the 96th overall episode of the series.

Actresses Cristin Milioti and Chloë Grace Moretz guest starred in the episode, the latter playing Kaylie Hooper, the granddaughter of Hank Hooper. Actor Tracy Morgan was absent from the episode. It was his second consecutive absence, as he was also not present in the previous episode, "It's Never Too Late for Now." Morgan had undergone a kidney transplant and would miss several episodes of the series whilst recovering. Some of the exterior shots of Chloë Grace Moretz's character's school were filmed outside the Museum of the City of New York, the same location formerly used by CW TV show Gossip Girl.

== Reception ==
According to Nielsen Media Research, "TGS Hates Women" was watched by 4.501 million viewers in its original American broadcast. It earned a 2.3 rating/6 share in the 18–49 demographic. This was an increase from the previous episode, "It's Never Too Late for Now", which was watched by 4.072 million American viewers.

The episode received generally, though not universally, positive reviews from television critics. Alan Sepinwall of HitFix praised Moretz's performance, describing Kaylie Hooper as "wonderfully played" and opining that "Alec Baldwin is often at his funniest in this role when Jack is going up against a completely ridiculous foe or obstacle, and I think a 14-year-old schemer makes a better foil for him than, say, Devon Banks has been". Ian McDonald of TV Overmind agreed, calling Jack's plot the "saving grace of the episode", and describing Liz's plot as "a chore to sit through, mostly because Milioti played the role of the female gross-out comic so believably that it became grating on [his] nerves."

Kelsea Stahler of Hollywood.com remarked: "the plot resembled a little spat between The Daily Show and feminist blog Jezebel a while back when the blog railed on The Daily Show for being anti-feminist for hiring hottie correspondent Olivia Munn." However, she concluded that the episode was a "downward shift" and that, despite the interesting subject matter, it ultimately had not accomplished anything.

Rebecca Traister at Salon.com said: "To dig deeply – and wittily – into these ultimately unsolvable but real issues, especially with direct tributes to places like Jezebel and more broadly the feminist critique of media powerhouses like Stewart's Daily Show or of Fey herself, is to pay them the honor of taking them seriously – seriously comedically." Traister characterized the episode as "Fey's clever, direct admission that she's been paying attention."
