= Subway Hero =

- 30 Rock episode
- Episode no.: Season 2 Episode 12
- Directed by: Don Scardino
- Written by: Jack Burditt; Robert Carlock
- Production code: 211
- Original air date: April 17, 2008

Guest appearances
- Michael Bloomberg as himself; Tim Conway as Bucky Bright; Dean Winters as Dennis Duffy; Keith Powell as Sammy Davis Jr.

Episode chronology
← Previous "MILF Island"	Next → "Succession"
- 30 Rock season 2

"Subway Hero" is the 12th episode of the second season of 30 Rock and 33rd episode of the series. It was written by Jack Burditt, one of the series' co-executive producers, and executive producer Robert Carlock. It was directed by Don Scardino. It aired on April 17, 2008 on the NBC network in the United States. Its guest stars include Michael Bloomberg, Tim Conway and Dean Winters. The Lord Stanley Cup is also jokingly listed as a guest star. Dennis Duffy's actions in the episode were modeled after real New York City Subway hero Wesley Autrey.

The episode revolves around Liz's former boyfriend, Dennis Duffy (Dean Winters), becoming a local celebrity when he saves somebody's life at a subway station. Jack Donaghy (Alec Baldwin) is looking for a celebrity to be the face of the Republican Party and Kenneth Parcell (Jack McBrayer) meets one of his idols, Bucky Bright (Tim Conway).

== Plot ==
When invited to Jack's office, Liz Lemon (Tina Fey) is asked whether or not she would mind having her former boyfriend, Dennis, appear on TGS with Tracy Jordan. Since they last met, Dennis saved somebody's life at a subway station and has become a local celebrity. Liz and Dennis meet up, and she agrees to let him appear on the show. Jenna Maroney (Jane Krakowski) is wary and warns Liz not to let herself fall in love with Dennis again, as Jenna warns Liz that being with Dennis is like eating Sabor de Soledad, a Latino brand of Cheetos-style cheese curls that Liz can't stop eating. When Liz realizes she does still have feelings for him, an excuse to get rid of him is presented when Dennis' "15 minutes of fame" are up (after she rejects his proposal to marry him) and Liz revokes her invitation. Liz later follows him to 47th–50th Streets–Rockefeller Center subway station, where he tries to regain his subway hero title by throwing her onto the tracks of an oncoming train.

Meanwhile, Jack is looking for a famous face to represent the Republican Party after having a falling-out with Chuck Norris and rejecting Bruce Willis and Jim Belushi. After struggling to find somebody, he selects Tracy Jordan (Tracy Morgan) for the position. Tracy initially refuses, as the Republican Party supports a lot of policies that negatively affect African-Americans, but changes his mind after having a near-death experience (Tracy electrocuted himself after jabbing a screwdriver into his CD player when it started skipping during Billy Joel's "We Didn't Start the Fire") where he meets Richard Nixon (played by Alec Baldwin) in Purgatory. One of Jack's failed candidates, Bucky Bright, befriends Kenneth during a tour of 30 Rockefeller Plaza; Bucky shares a number of horrifying backstage stories about the early days of television that wind up traumatizing Kenneth, until the two bond over their shared "weird" experiences in the business.

== Production ==
Some scenes of "Subway Hero" were filmed on March 10, 2008. This episode was originally expected to air on April 10, 2008 but was rescheduled to air on April 17. The episode "MILF Island" aired on April 10 instead. On the newspaper shown to Liz by Jenna, the front-page article states that Kay Cannon wrote the article. Cannon was a writer for various episodes of 30 Rock. Upon working with Mayor Michael Bloomberg, Dean Winters described Bloomberg as "fun" and that "he was cool. And he's a natural." Given that Dennis was established as a New York Islanders fan in previous episodes, the writers decided to have him spend a day with the Stanley Cup, including a joke where he forgets it in a taxi. The scene that takes place at the Rockefeller Center Subway Station was actually filmed on the 42nd Street Shuttle platform at the Grand Central Subway Station, with prop signs reading "47–50 Sts – Rockefeller Center" placed over the original signage, and a shuttle train relabelled as a D train.

== Reception ==
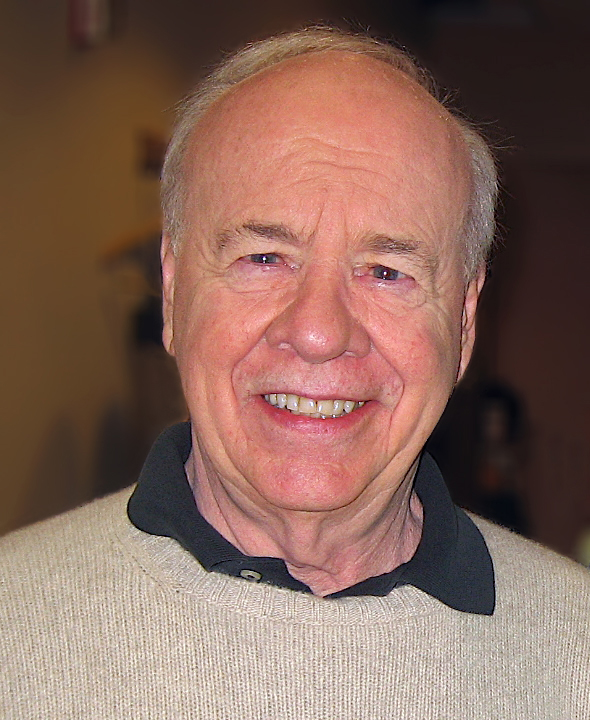
Tim Conway guest starred in this episode as a long forgotten television star named Bucky Bright.

"Subway Hero" brought in an average of 6.4 million viewers. This was the highest-rated episode since the episode "Somebody To Love" which aired on November 15, 2007. The episode also achieved a 2.8/8 in the key 18- to 49-year-old demographic. The 2.8 refers to 2.8% of all 18- to 49-year-olds in the U.S. and the 8 refers to 8% of all 18- to 49-year-olds watching television at the time of the broadcast, in the U.S. This episode built by 0.2 points, in the 18–49 demographic, from the episode of My Name Is Earl, named "No Heads And A Duffel Bag," which aired prior to it.

Claire Zulkey of The Los Angeles Times wrote that "In some ways the episode almost felt too comfortable, with the familiar story lines and even the obligatory fantasy featuring Baldwin as a former president. The show, thus far post-strike, hasn't seemed like it has distinguished itself too much from Season 1. But is that really so bad?" Ann Oldenburg of USA Today said that "As always, [this episode of] 30 Rock was filled with fast one-liners." Jeff Labrecque of Entertainment Weekly thought that "Even for the always politically astute 30 Rock, last night's episode was unusually so." Bob Sassone of AOL's TV Squad said that "[This] episode of 30 Rock had more jokes and one-liners - the kind where you actually smile and laugh out loud" and that "There's no other comedy that's running on all cylinders like 30 Rock is right now." Matt Webb Mitovich of TV Guide said that "[the episode] was filled not with just great laughs, but also some heart. Damn the roller coaster that is the crazy Dennis-and-Liz on-again/off-again thing!"

Robert Canning of IGN wrote that "this is why 30 Rock is still a show you can't miss. Even the weaker episodes can be damn funny." Canning rated the episode 7.7 out of 10. The Daily Herald's Ted Cox wrote that "[he has] to insist that it sure seems to me that not just Fey and Liz, but most of all viewers at home deserve better." Alan Sepinwall of The Star-Ledger said that "I saw "Subway Hero" a while back, and as I wrote in my column last week, my reaction to it was roughly the same as it was to "MILF Island": a number of very funny individual moments, but an episode that was less than the sum of its parts." David Hinckley of The New York Daily News said that there were "a lot of former-boyfriend gags that are, once again, well-formulated" in this episode and that "They work." Hinckley also wrote that "the real reason ["Subway Hero"] is must-see TV is a guest spot by Tim Conway as an old-time television star whose deadpan recollections of the "good old days" keep getting weirder and funnier. He darn near steals the show."

Conway won the Primetime Emmy Award for Outstanding Guest Actor in a Comedy Series for this episode.
