= Double-Edged Sword =

- 30 Rock episode
- Episode no.: Season 5 Episode 14
- Directed by: Don Scardino
- Written by: Kay Cannon; Tom Ceraulo
- Production code: 514
- Original air date: February 10, 2011

Guest appearances
- Matt Damon as Carol Burnett; John Cho as Lorne; Elizabeth Banks as Avery Jessup

Episode chronology
← Previous "¡Qué Sorpresa!"	Next → "It's Never Too Late for Now"
- 30 Rock season 5

"Double-Edged Sword" is the fourteenth episode of the fifth season of the American television comedy series 30 Rock, and the 94th overall episode of the series. It was directed by Don Scardino, and written by Kay Cannon and Tom Ceraulo. The episode originally aired on NBC in the United States on February 10, 2011. Guest stars in this episode include Matt Damon, John Cho, and Elizabeth Banks.

In this episode, Liz and Jack realise they are both dating people with similar personality traits to themselves. They consider that this has good and bad aspects, hence a double-edged sword.

Jack Donaghy (Alec Baldwin) heads to Toronto with his wife, Avery (Elizabeth Banks). When she goes into labor, they try their best to get back to the United States with the help of a meth smuggler, Lorne (John Cho). Meanwhile, Liz Lemon (Tina Fey) boards a plane with her boyfriend Carol (Matt Damon) as the pilot. Things do not go well when the plane has not flown yet and Carol keeps telling the passengers that they will leave "in about half an hour" several times. Elsewhere, Tracy Jordan (Tracy Morgan) deals with the pressure of having won an EGOT and the formal expectations that he has to meet.

== Plot ==
Jack Donaghy (Alec Baldwin) leaves for Toronto with his wife, Avery (Elizabeth Banks), where she unexpectedly goes into labour several weeks early. The pair are horrified at the idea that their child might be born Canadian and make a dash for the United States border. Along the way, they meet a meth smuggler called Lorne (special guest star John Cho), who gives them a ride.

Meanwhile, Liz Lemon (Tina Fey) is going on holiday with Carol (Matt Damon), except that he is flying the plane that they will be going on. He makes a remark about contrasting the plane with a "Tallahassee strip club." When it comes time for take off, however, the plane does not move and Carol issues repeated announcements that the plane will leave "in about half an hour." However, the passengers end up waiting on the tarmac for hours without water and as the cabin grows hotter.

Back at TGS, Tracy Jordan (Tracy Morgan) has finally achieved one of his lifetime ambitions — earning an EGOT (winning an Emmy, Grammy, Oscar, and Tony). However, he is dismayed when he learns that he is now expected to shoulder greater responsibility and set a good example to others.

Ultimately, Liz leads a protest against Carol's handling of the plane, which results in a standoff and the pair breaking up. As for Jack and Avery, they decide to have the baby in Canada after talking with Lorne. Lastly, Tracy informs Kenneth Parcell (Jack McBrayer) that he is going to Africa in order to do good. However, it is revealed that Tracy was lying to Kenneth and has actually decided to hide out in a warehouse in an undisclosed location. This way, he does not have to deal with the responsibility expected of him.

== Production ==
The true reason for Tracy Jordan (Tracy Morgan) being written out of the storyline is that Morgan had undergone a kidney transplantation. He missed the entirety of the next two episodes ("It's Never Too Late for Now" and "TGS Hates Women") and had reduced roles in several further episodes of the series while recovering.

== Reception ==
According to the Nielsen Media Research, this episode of 30 Rock was watched by 4.59 million households in its original American broadcast. It earned a 2.3 rating/6 share in the 18–49 demographic. This means that it was seen by 2.3 percent of all 18- to 49-year-olds, and 6 percent of all 18- to 49-year-olds watching television at the time of the broadcast.
