= Secrets and Lies (30 Rock) =

- 30 Rock episode
- Episode no.: Season 2 Episode 8
- Directed by: Michael Engler
- Written by: Ron Weiner
- Cinematography by: Vanja Černjul
- Production code: 208
- Original air date: December 6, 2007

Guest appearances
- James Carville as himself; Edie Falco as Celeste Cunningham; John Lutz as J.D. Lutz; Reshma Shetty as Party Attendant

Episode chronology
← Previous "Cougars"	Next → "Ludachristmas"
- 30 Rock season 2

"Secrets and Lies" is the eighth episode of the second season of 30 Rock, and the twenty-ninth overall. It was written by Ron Weiner and directed by Michael Engler. The episode first aired on December 6, 2007 on the NBC network in the United States. Guest stars in this episode include James Carville, Edie Falco, John Lutz, and Reshma Shetty.

In this episode, Celeste "C.C." Cunningham (played by Edie Falco) wishes to go public with her relationship with Jack Donaghy (Alec Baldwin). Jenna Maroney (Jane Krakowski) gets angry when she thinks Liz Lemon (Tina Fey) lets Tracy Jordan (Tracy Morgan) do anything he likes. Frank Rossitano (Judah Friedlander) and James "Toofer" Spurlock (Keith Powell) feud over Toofer's status as a Harvard University alumnus.

== Plot ==
Jack is worried when his girlfriend C.C., the Democratic congresswoman for the state of Vermont, tells him that she wants to go public with their relationship. The pair had been avoiding this because C.C. is suing the Sheinhardt Wig Company, the fictional parent company of NBC. During their secret relationship, Jack and C.C. had been sneaking to each other's house in disguises, including C.C. as a plumber named Mr. Spoonatelli. C.C. confides in Liz (after she finds out about their relationship), and Jack confides in political consultant James Carville, who gives Jack advice on how two important people from opposite political positions can make their relationship work "Cajun style", without regard for how others perceive them. Eventually, Jack takes C.C. to dinner in the GE executive dining room where he reveals his relationship to the other executives, leading to the other executives making some bizarre revelations of their own.

When Jenna wins an award for her work on Mystic Pizza: The Musical: The Movie, in the category of "Best Actress in a Movie Based on a Musical Based on a Movie", Tracy is annoyed that he never wins any awards of his own and storms off the set. To get him back to work, Liz tells him that he has won a Pacific Rim Emmy Award for his work on TGS. Pete Hornberger (Scott Adsit) helps Liz stage a fake acceptance speech for Tracy, which is also attended by Tracy's co-stars, Jenna and Josh Girard (Lonny Ross), despite it taking place in the middle of the night. During his acceptance speech Tracy thanks everybody who works on the show, except for Jenna, and then pulls Jenna's dress down in a Japanese practice he claims is called "Sharking." An enraged Jenna claims Liz is willing to jump through hoops for Tracy, but not her. As a result, she becomes disobedient and uncooperative and starts her own entourage, much like Tracy. Liz becomes fed up with Jenna's new behavior, reveals to her that she in fact "coddle[s] the crap" out of her as well as Tracy. Liz then reveals that Jenna did not win an award for Mystic Pizza: The Musical: The Movie and that the "award" statue was actually a cookie. This is enough for Jenna to happily return to work.

After a night of performing stand up at Harvard University, Frank comes into work wearing a Harvard sweatshirt, even though he did not attend the university. Outraged by this, Harvard alumnus Toofer tells him to take it off. When Frank refuses and comes into work the next day in full Harvard regalia, Toofer retaliates by dressing up as Frank. Unable to back down for fear of their coworkers mocking them, their argument is eventually mediated "Cajun style" by James Carville, who then proceeds to also demonstrate how to steal candy from a vending machine..."Cajun style".

== Production ==
This episode was performed live on stage at the Upright Citizens Brigade Theatre. The performance, which was titled 30 Rock — On Strike!, was to display support for the 2007–2008 Writers Guild of America strike, which began on November 5, 2007. The performance took place on November 19, 2007. All the main cast members of the series were in attendance, although due to other commitments, guest star Edie Falco was unable to appear in her role as Celeste "C.C." Cunningham. In her place was the Saturday Night Live head writer, Paula Pell. As guest star James Carville was also unable to attend, an unnamed 30 Rock writer filled in for him. Other 30 Rock writers, including Donald Glover, also played the smaller, "bit" parts. During the "commercial breaks", cast member Jack McBrayer and recurring cast member John Lutz improvised fake comedic advertisements for various products. Sheinhardt Wig Company t-shirts, which were signed by the cast of 30 Rock, were also raffled off during the performance.

== Reception ==
"Secrets and Lies" brought in an average of 5.8 million viewers. The episode also achieved a 2.7/7 in the key 18- to 49-year-old demographic. The 2.7 refers to 2.7% of all 18- to 49-year-olds in the U.S., and the 7 refers to 7% of all 18- to 49-year-olds watching television at the time of the broadcast in the U.S.. This episode ranked first in the male 18- to 49-year-old demographic, growing 4% from its lead-in of the My Name Is Earl episode "Early Release."

Robert Canning of IGN wrote that the episode "came close to fulfilling [its] potential, but was unable to keep the rapid-fire comedic pace going for the entire episode." He added that the second half of the show was not "a complete loss, but, man, that first act just steamrolled viewers with hilarious bit after hilarious bit." Matt Webb Mitovich of TV Guide thought that the "unexpected treat this week was guest star James Carville, who's [sic] presence as confidant to Jack not only made sense, but Carville also had a lot of fun lampooning himself 'Cajun style' and all. And look at how well his advice for Frank and Twofer [sic] worked!"
