= Succession (30 Rock) =

- 30 Rock episode
- Episode no.: Season 2 Episode 13
- Directed by: Gail Mancuso
- Written by: Andrew Guest; John Riggi
- Cinematography by: Vanja Černjul
- Production code: 213
- Original air date: April 24, 2008

Guest appearances
- Will Arnett as Devon Banks; Chris Parnell as Dr. Leo Spaceman; Brian Stack as Howard Jorgensen; Rip Torn as Don Geiss; Kevin Brown as Dot Com Slattery; Grizz Chapman as Grizz Griswold; John Lutz as J.D. Lutz

Episode chronology
← Previous "Subway Hero"	Next → "Sandwich Day"
- 30 Rock season 2

"Succession" is the thirteenth episode of NBC's second season of 30 Rock and the thirty-fourth episode overall. It was written by Andrew Guest and one of the seasons' co-executive producers, John Riggi; it was directed by Gail Mancuso. It first aired on April 24, 2008 in the United States. Guest stars in this episode include Will Arnett, Marceline Hugot, Chris Parnell, Brian Stack, and Rip Torn.

In this episode Jack Donaghy (Alec Baldwin) and Devon Banks' (Will Arnett) race to be the new CEO of General Electric comes to an end; in a parody of Amadeus, Tracy Jordan (Tracy Morgan) gets the idea to make a pornographic video game with Frank (Judah Friedlander) playing Salieri to his Mozart, and Liz Lemon (Tina Fey) prepares to become the new Head of East Coast Television and Microwave Oven Programming. In keeping with the Amadeus parody, the music of Wolfgang Amadeus Mozart (a favorite of Jeff Richmond, the show's regular composer) is used to score much of the episode.

== Plot ==
Jack meets with retiring corporate head Don Geiss (Rip Torn), who discloses that he has chosen Jack over his soon-to-be son-in-law Devon to run the company. Devon returns with intent to sabotage Jack, but Liz attempts to make Devon look bad by forcibly making out with him in front of a security camera. Jack chooses Liz to replace himself as Vice President of East Coast Television and Microwave Oven Programming. Liz accepts when she learns of the higher salary and tells her staff "Suck it monkeys, I'm going corporate."

Tracy begins to feel he is an embarrassment to his son when he is excluded from a "Bring your father to school" day. Hoping to make his family proud, Tracy searches for a legacy and decides to produce the world's first pornographic video game. Despite Frank's skepticism, Tracy has some success in designing the game by conquering the uncanny valley, a scale on which the strangeness of special effects are measured.

A depressed Devon becomes resigned to the fact that Jack will receive the promotion. Don Geiss, however, goes into a diabetic coma, despite the efforts of Dr. Spaceman (Chris Parnell), before he can announce his decision. Devon denies knowing that Geiss had chosen Jack as his successor. The next day, Devon appears in Jack's office, revealing he has convinced the board to put Kathy Geiss (Marceline Hugot), his fiancée, in charge, with Devon acting as the power behind the throne. He then kicks Jack out of his office.

== Reception ==
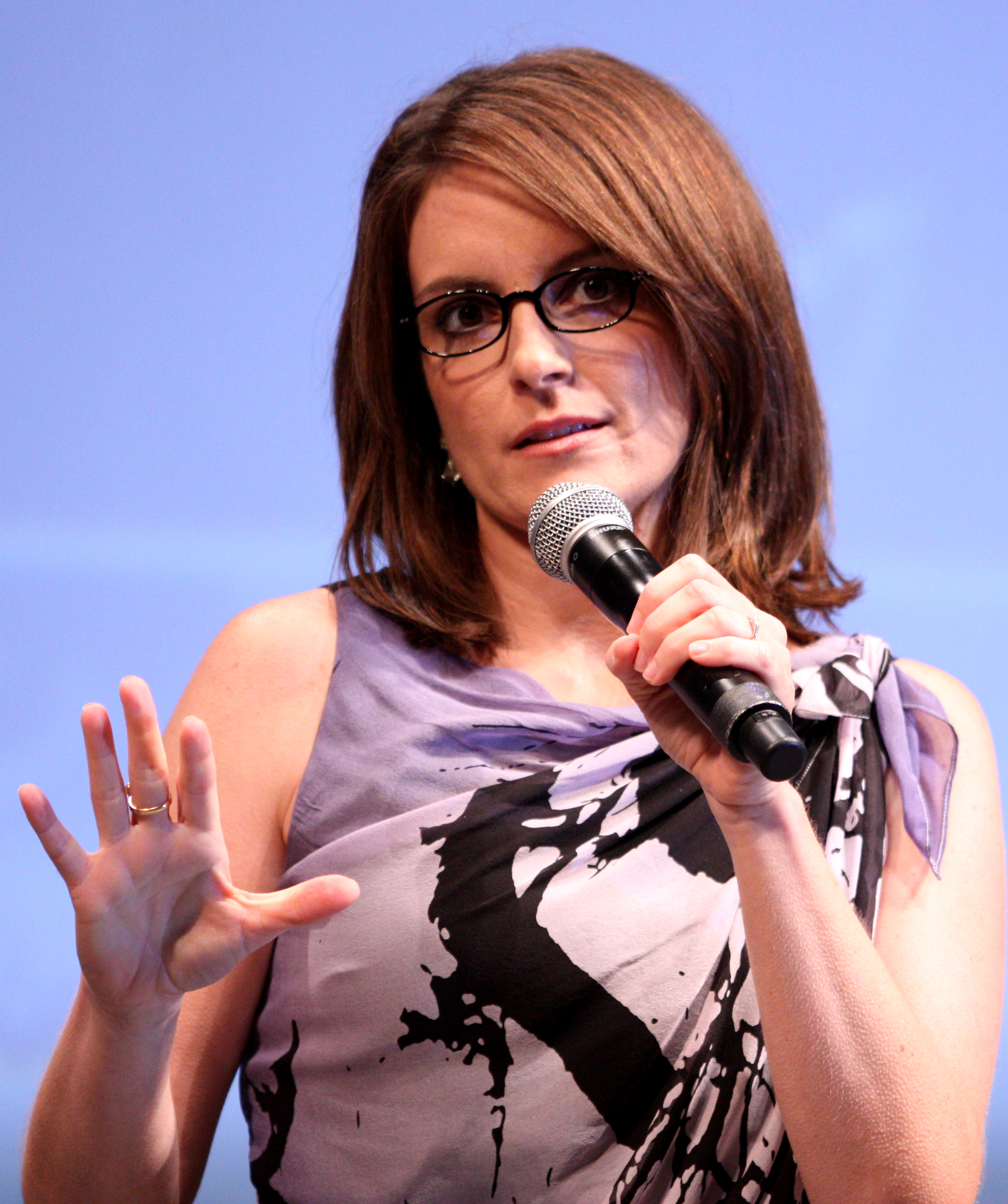
Alan Sepinwell of The Star-Ledger said that this episode "showcased" Tina Fey as an actress.

"Succession" was viewed by an average of 5.5 million American viewers upon its original broadcast. The episode also achieved a 2.8/7 in the key 18- to 49-year-old demographic. The 2.8 refers to 2.8% of all 18- to 49-year-olds, and the 7 refers to 7% of all 18- to 49-year-olds watching television at the time of the broadcast. The episode also ranked first place among males aged 18–34 against episodes of CSI and Grey's Anatomy.

The episode received some positive feedback from critics. Bob Sassone of AOL's TV Squad described "Succession" as "a great episode" with "a lot of great lines". Sassone compared the episode to a soap opera, and hoped that the pornographic video game storyline would be continued. Robert Canning of IGN complimented Devon's appearances on 30 Rock, and felt that "Succession" would be the first episode in a new story arc, which was a good thing. He rated the episode an 8 out of 10. Alan Sepinwall of The Star-Ledger praised the episode as "fabulous". Sepinwall noted that "Succession" included an "inspired riff on Amadeus", and compared Tracy and Frank when they were working on a pornographic video game to Mozart and Salieri. Less positively, he commented on the "one-note-ness of Will Arnett as Devon Banks", and did not like the Baby Mama ad that was displayed on screen during the "Mozart montage".
