= MILF Island =

- 30 Rock episode
- Episode no.: Season 2 Episode 11
- Directed by: Kevin Rodney Sullivan
- Written by: Tina Fey; Matt Hubbard
- Production code: 212
- Original air date: April 10, 2008

Guest appearances
- Timothy Adams as NY Post Guy; Rob Huebel as MILF Island Host; John Lutz as J.D. Lutz; Maulik Pancholy as Jonathan

Episode chronology
← Previous "Episode 210"	Next → "Subway Hero"
- 30 Rock season 2

"MILF Island" is the eleventh episode of NBC's second season of 30 Rock and thirty-second episode overall. It was written by the series' creator, executive producer and lead actress Tina Fey, and producer Matt Hubbard. The director of the episode was Kevin Rodney Sullivan. It aired on April 10, 2008 on the NBC network in the United States. Guest stars in this episode include Timothy Adams, Rob Huebel, John Lutz and Maulik Pancholy.

The episode revolves around the season finale of Jack Donaghy's (Alec Baldwin) reality television show hit, MILF Island, which parallels the "real world" incidents happening in the office. Someone tells a reporter for The New York Post that Jack is a "Class A Moron" and that he can "eat my poo." The writers of TGS with Tracy Jordan argue as they suspect one of them made the comment.

== Plot ==
The cast and crew of TGS with Tracy Jordan gather to watch the season finale of Jack's summer reality show hit MILF Island, a series the plot of which is described as "25 Super-Hot Moms, 50 eighth grade boys, no rules." The staff soon discover that one of them told a reporter for The New York Post that Jack was a "Class A Moron" and that "He can eat my poo." They then spiral into an argument as they try to find out who made the statement. Kenneth Parcell (Jack McBrayer) later recalls that he heard Liz, in an elevator, making the statement to the journalist. Liz makes a false promise that she will tell Jack that it was her to avoid him hearing the truth from Kenneth. Liz finally reveals the truth to Jack only to find out that he already knew it was she who said it, and he's not going to fire her—instead, she has to put together a new TV series for MILF Island's manipulative competitor Deborah.

Meanwhile, as he is planning to watch the season finale of MILF Island alone in his office, Pete Hornberger (Scott Adsit) gets stuck in a vending machine while trying to steal a candy bar. Pete's many attempts to break free from the machine end in failure when the machine ends up falling on him.

== Production ==
"MILF Island" was filmed in early March 2008. The episode of 30 Rock which aired the following week, "Subway Hero," was originally expected to air on April 10, 2008 in place of this episode, but for unknown reasons "MILF Island" aired on that date instead. This marked the only time in the series' first four seasons that completed episodes were not broadcast in the same order as they were produced.

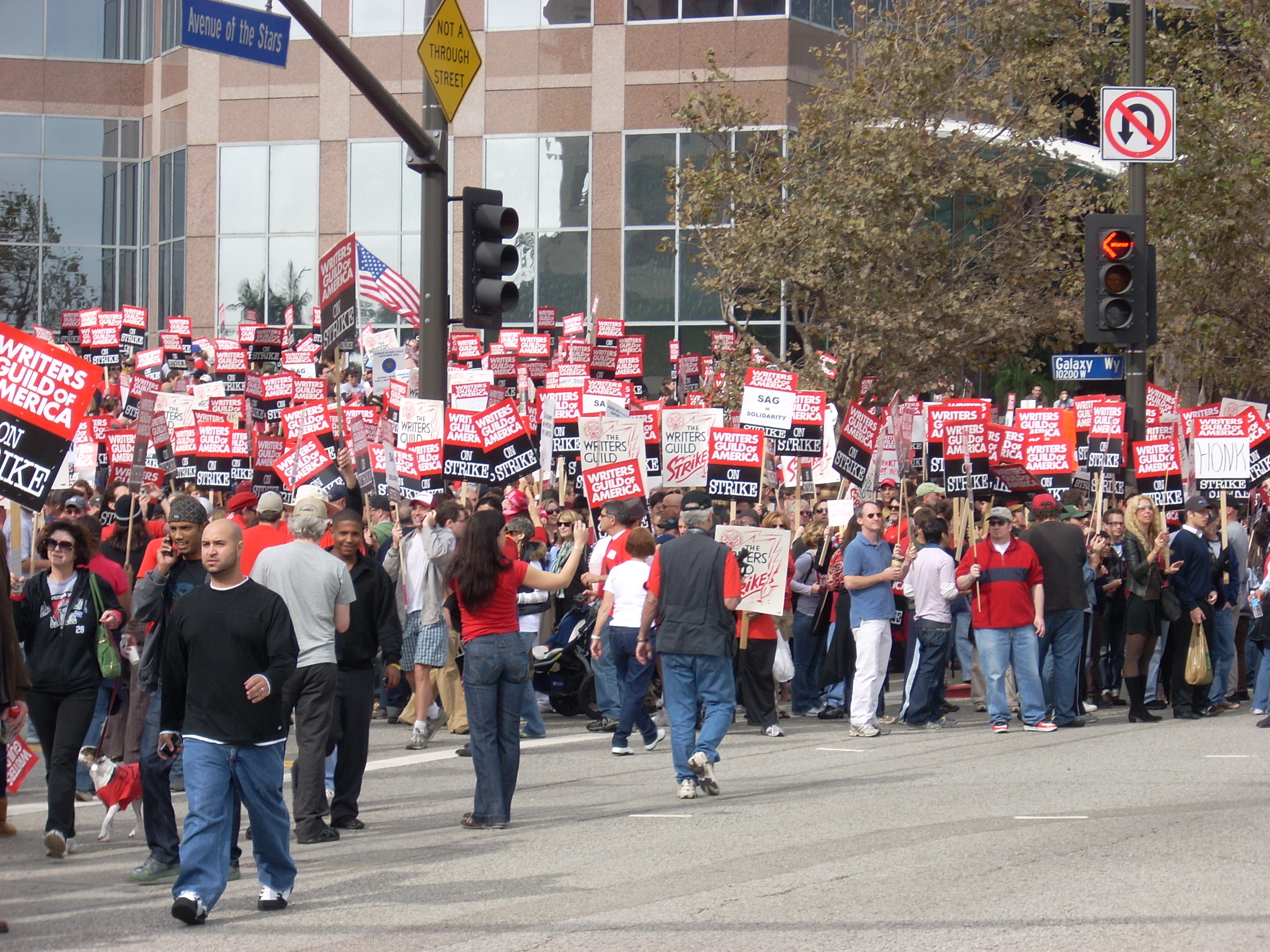
The Writers Guild of America was on strike for 100 days causing production of 30 Rock to go on hiatus for four months.

Confusion was caused prior to the broadcast of this episode when many critics speculated about how the episode would tackle the use of the word MILF without actually explaining that it is an acronym for "Mother I'd Like to Fuck", as that would have broken Federal Communications Commission rules. The situation was compared to the episode of Seinfeld called "The Contest" which features the subject of masturbation but the characters could never actually say the word "masturbation" and did so via metaphors.

"MILF Island" was the first episode of 30 Rock to be broadcast since "Episode 210," on January 10, 2008, due to the 2007–2008 Writers Guild of America strike. The Writers Guild of America (WGA) went on strike at 12:01 am Eastern Standard Time on November 5, 2007. Filming of 30 Rock's final written episode concluded on November 9, 2007. Members of Writers Guild of America, East and Writers Guild of America, West voted to end the 100-day strike on February 12, 2008. Writers were allowed to return to work on the same day. The WGA allowed for show runners to return to work on February 11, in preparation for the conclusion of the strike. The show runner for 30 Rock is executive producer Robert Carlock. The writers returned to work on February 13. During the strike, executive producer, writer and star of 30 Rock Tina Fey had to balance her duties in order not to breach WGA strike rules. Fey took to the picket lines along with co-star Jack McBrayer, while Alec Baldwin also blogged on The Huffington Post website in support of the WGA writers.

== Reception ==
"MILF Island" brought in an average of 5.7 million American viewers, performing similarly to previous episodes of the second season. This episode achieved a 2.7/7 in the key 18–49 demographic; the 2.7 refers to 2.7% of all 18- to 49-year-olds in the U.S. while the 7 refers to 7% of all 18- to 49-year-olds watching television at the time of the broadcast in the U.S.

Jeff Labrecque of Entertainment Weekly wrote that "after three months of strike-enforced exile, [this episode of] 30 Rock generated the expectations and excitement normally reserved for a season premiere," also saying that "the show [is] in midseason form." Matt Webb Mitovich of TV Guide said that he would "be lying if [he] said this was a super-great episode." Webb Mitovich went on to say that "[He] did like, though — and thought they should have done a lot more with — the "parallels" between the MILF events and the strategizing staff." Bob Sassone of AOL's TV Squad thought that "It's almost as if this was the season opener" and that this episode was "ambitious." Michael N of Television Without Pity awarded the episode a grade of B. Robert Canning of IGN said that "the overall story arc was less than what we had anticipated from this critical favorite making its post-writers-strike return, the episode was still pretty damn funny." Canning also said that this was "an episode that was divided between a less-than-average story and many hilarious moments." Canning criticized how "30 Rock has never really given [Pete Hornberger and Scott Adsit] (the character or the actor) the showcase that he deserves."

== See also ==
- The Cougar (TV series)
- MILF Manor, a real television program that began airing on TLC in 2023
