= Season 2, Episode 10 (30 Rock) =

- 30 Rock episode
- Episode no.: Season 2 Episode 10
- Directed by: Richard Shepard
- Written by: Robert Carlock; Donald Glover
- Production code: 210
- Original air date: January 10, 2008

Guest appearances
- Kevin Brown as Dot Com Slattery; Grizz Chapman as Grizz Griswold; Edie Falco as C.C. Cunningham; Edward Herrmann as Walter; Toby Huss as Deutsche Stimme; Gladys Knight as herself

Episode chronology
← Previous "Ludachristmas"	Next → "MILF Island"
- 30 Rock season 2

The untitled tenth episode of the second season of the television series 30 Rock is the 31st episode of the series overall, and was first broadcast in the United States on January 10, 2008, on the NBC network. The episode was written by showrunner Robert Carlock and Donald Glover, and was directed by Richard Shepard. Guest stars include Kevin Brown, Grizz Chapman, Edie Falco, Toby Huss and Gladys Knight, who appeared as herself. The episode focuses on Liz Lemon (Tina Fey) and her decision to invest in real-estate, Jack Donaghy's (Alec Baldwin) choice between his job and his girlfriend, and Kenneth Parcell's (Jack McBrayer) addiction to coffee.

The production and broadcasting of this episode was heavily affected by the 2007–2008 Writers Guild of America strike. Although not unanimously praised by critics, the episode attracted generally positive reviews and was particularly appreciated for its cast's rendition of the 1973 Gladys Knight & the Pips hit "Midnight Train to Georgia". Liz also sings a snippet of Alanis Morissette's "You Oughta Know" when leaving a message for the co-op board.

== Plot ==
Liz takes Jack's advice to invest in real estate, and Jenna Maroney tells Liz that her business manager is selling his apartment. The sale is subject to the approval of the building's cooperative board, but Liz makes a bad impression and her purchase offer is rejected. Liz gets herself drunk and makes numerous phone calls to the board.

Jack is involved in negotiations to acquire a German cable television network, but is struggling to juggle his job and his relationship with C.C., whose work as a congresswoman keeps her busy in Washington D.C. Unable to see each other when they want to, the couple decide to "meet in the middle" (in a betting parlor in Pennsylvania). While exploring the surrounding area, they find they can better focus on each other and their relationship. However, C.C. misses an important vote and Liz is forced to negotiate with the Germans on Jack's behalf, accidentally offering to sell NBC in the process. Realizing they cannot balance their relationship with their careers, they decide to break up. Jack, in conversation with Liz, compares his relationship to Liz's previous relationship with Floyd, and Liz declares in song that she has to go.

Tracy Jordan buys a coffee machine and puts it on Kenneth Parcell's desk, causing him to develop a caffeine addiction. Comparing New York to Sodom, Kenneth claims that he has been "sodomized", and feels guilty that he has let New York change him, contrary to a promise he made to his mother. He therefore decides to return to Georgia on the midnight train; however, he quickly returns, explaining that the train was actually departing at 11:45 and he missed it.

== Production ==
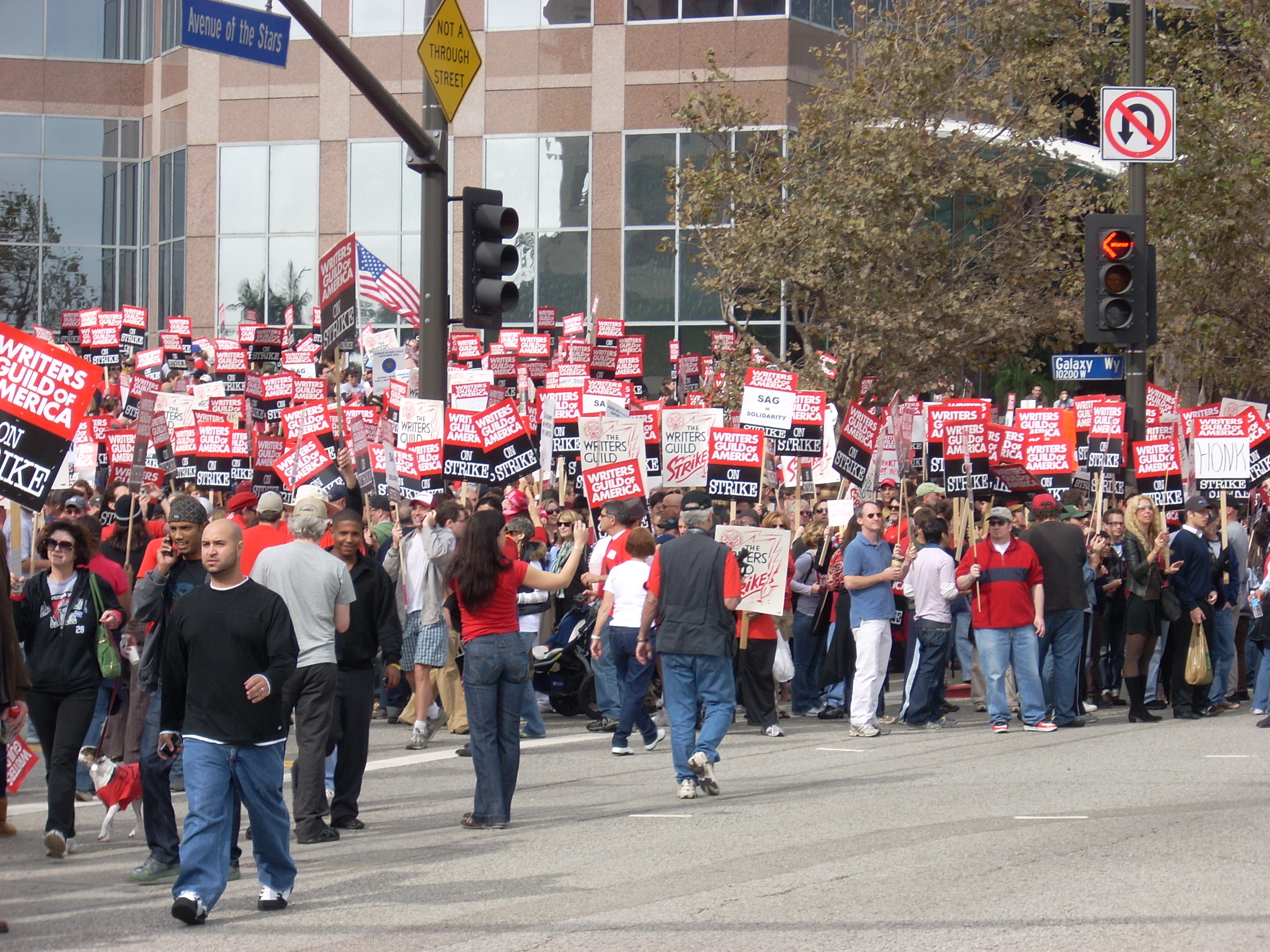
The Writers Guild of America was on strike for 100 days.

Parts of this episode were filmed during the week of November 5, 2007, which coincided with the 2007–2008 Writers Guild of America strike. The strike, which began at 00:01 EST on November 5, 2007, did not affect the episode as it had been written earlier and filming was finished on November 9. Members of Writers Guild of America, East and Writers Guild of America, West voted to end the writers' strike on February 12, 2008, and although writers were allowed to return to work on the same day, Robert Carlock returned to work on February 11. The remaining writers resumed work on February 13, which began the production of the next episode, "MILF Island". During the filming, actor and executive producer Tina Fey had to balance her duties in order not to breach WGA strike rules. Fey also took to the picket lines along with co-star Jack McBrayer. Alec Baldwin wrote blogs on The Huffington Post website in order to demonstrate his support for the WGA writers.

Broadcast on January 10, 2008, this was the final episode, including repeats, of 30 Rock to be broadcast until the episode "MILF Island" in April. This episode is also notable for being officially unnamed; NBC billed this episode on its press releases as "Episode 210".

== Reception ==
On its original broadcast in the United States, Episode 210 was viewed by 6.0 million viewers and earned a 2.8/7 in the 18- to 49-year-old demographic. This means that it was seen by 2.8% of all 18- to 49-year-olds, and 7% of all 18- to 49-year-olds watching television at the time of the broadcast.

Entertainment Weekly's Jeff Labrecque wrote "the episode really finished strong with a fabulous Gladys Knight musical number". Matt Webb Mitovich of TV Guide also praised the musical number, saying "that 'Midnight Train to Georgia' number at the end of tonight's episode... Wow. So out of nowhere and so fun." Bob Sassone of AOL's TV Squad said that the episode "was a good episode to go into the hiatus with, if that makes things better". He criticized the fact that the fictional TGS writing staff was not present in this episode, even though they could have been effectively used. Michael Neal of Television Without Pity awarded the episode a grading of A+. The Boston Globe's Joanna Weiss reviewed the episode positively, saying "[the episode] concluded with a musical interlude that was both hilarious and wistful".

Despite the good reviews, there was no universal acclaim from critics as a whole. Robert Canning of IGN said that "[this episode] wasn't the most spectacular half-hour from this truncated season" and "unfortunately, there wasn't all that much that was funny about it. Sure, there were a couple of decent one-liners, but overall [Kenneth's storyline] offered up nothing new." Despite these criticisms, Canning added further praise to the "Midnight Train to Georgia" performance. Canning gave this episode a rating of 8.4 out of 10.

Edie Falco was nominated for the Primetime Emmy Award for Outstanding Guest Actress in a Comedy Series for this episode.

== See also ==
- 2007–2008 Writers Guild of America strike
- Effect of the 2007–08 Writers Guild of America strike on television
