= It's Never Too Late for Now =

- 30 Rock episode
- Episode no.: Season 5 Episode 15
- Directed by: John Riggi
- Written by: Vali Chandrasekaran
- Production code: 515
- Original air date: February 15, 2011

Guest appearances
- Eion Bailey as Anders; Adriane Lenox as Sherry; Sue Galloway as Sue

Episode chronology
← Previous "Double-Edged Sword"	Next → "TGS Hates Women"
- 30 Rock season 5

"It's Never Too Late for Now" is the fifteenth episode of the fifth season of the American television comedy series 30 Rock, and the 95th overall episode of the series. It was directed by John Riggi, and written by Vali Chandrasekaran. The episode originally aired on NBC in the United States on February 15, 2011. Guest stars in this episode include Eion Bailey, Adriane Lenox, and Sue Galloway.

In the episode, Liz Lemon (Tina Fey) decides to give up on love and tries being a spinster, but eventually meets a man named Anders (Eion Bailey). However, there is more going on than there initially seems. Meanwhile, Jack Donaghy (Alec Baldwin) finds it hard to negotiate a proper salary with his night nurse, Sherry (Adriane Lenox), as she has some sort of leverage on him. Furthermore, Pete Hornberger (Scott Adsit) and Frank Rossitano (Judah Friedlander) form a band and write a song.

== Plot ==
Following her breakup with her pilot boyfriend Carol (Matt Damon), Liz Lemon (Tina Fey) announces her intention to give up on love. Instead, she will become a spinster. To demonstrate this, she has bought a cat, calling it Emily Dickinson, and joined the senior center book club, which is reading Murder on the Orient Express. Jenna Maroney (Jane Krakowski) is concerned and decides to take Liz to a bar called "Canal Yards Project." She wants to show Liz that there are still viable men out there. Liz is uninterested until she meets an attractive man named Anders (Eion Bailey), with whom she winds up having a one-night stand.

Meanwhile, Jack Donaghy (Alec Baldwin) has difficulty negotiating a salary with his baby's night nurse, Sherry (Adriane Lenox), whose approach to negotiation consists of eating a tangerine silently until he gives in, which completely throws him off. At TGS, Frank Rossitano (Judah Friedlander) discovers that Pete Hornberger (Scott Adsit) used to be in Loverboy, so the pair form a new band of their own and write a song entitled "It's Never Too Late for Now." During the song's recording process, arguments erupt between Pete and Frank, particularly when Frank's girlfriend Yuki (an obvious Yoko Ono parallel) becomes involved.

Finally, Jack decides to use his night nurse's bargaining techniques in a business meeting with Kabletown. He achieves great success in doing so. Meanwhile, Frank and Pete put their arguments aside. Liz arrives back at TGS the following morning and has decided not to give up on love after all. However, in true Agatha Christie fashion, she deduces that there was more to the night than there seemed at first. It is revealed the entire evening was orchestrated by her friends, that "Canal Yards Project" is an anagram of "Tracy Jordan's Place," and Anders was a Swiss prostitute recommended by Martha Stewart. Despite this, Liz chooses to accept a simpler explanation for the evening and rejects spinsterhood, believing that she will find love again. She releases Emily Dickinson but the cat is carried off by a hawk.

== Production ==
Actor Tracy Morgan was absent from this episode. It was his first of two absences, which continued with the following episode, "TGS Hates Women". Morgan had undergone a kidney transplantation and would miss or have reduced roles in several episodes of the series while recovering.

== Reception ==
Ryan McGee of The A.V. Club gave the episode an A−, praising the unification of the storylines.

According to the Nielsen Media Research, this episode of 30 Rock was watched by 4.07 million households in its original American broadcast. It earned a 2.0 rating/6 share in the 18–49 demographic. This means that it was seen by 2.0 percent of all 18- to 49-year-olds, and 6 percent of all 18- to 49-year-olds watching television at the time of the broadcast.
