= Greg Scarnici =

American comedic writer, director

Greg Scarnici (born April 8, 1972) is an American television, film and music producer, DGA director, SAG/AFTRA performer, DJ and drag artist.

== Biography ==
Scarnici was born in Jamaica, Queens, and continues to work in New York City, where he balances work in theatre, film, and television.

He first gained fame for his viral music video parodies, featured on Anderson Cooper 360, Fox News Channel, on VH1's Best Week Ever and in Entertainment Weekly; as of 2016, the parodies had been viewed over ten million times on YouTube. His work has also been featured on MTV, VH1, Fox News and CNN.

As of 2025, he was a senior associate producer at Saturday Night Live (SNL), having been associated with SNL since 2014. He has been a contributing writer for The Huffington Post.

Scarnici has also been featured on the television shows 30 Rock, Nick Cannon's Short Circuitz, Straight Plan for the Gay Man, and Saturday Night Live, where he has also contributed jokes and promos.

Associate-producer television credits include Saturday Night Live, the Macy's Fourth of July Fireworks Spectacular, and the 2014 NBA All-Star Pre-Game Concert. Film credits include the 2000 independent film Glam-Trash and the short films Dead End and Children of the Dune.

== Books ==
In 2010, Scarnici released Sex in Drag, a parody of American entertainer Madonna's book Sex; the parody was photographed entirely on Fire Island.

In 2015, his first collection of comedic essays, I Hope My Mother Doesn't Read This, was published by Thought Catalog books.

In March 2019, Scarnici released his second collection of comedic essays, Dungeons and Drag Queens, about his experiences on Fire Island.

In 2020, he released Hot Rods, a parody of a vintage gay porn magazine from the 1970s shot entirely on Fire Island.

=== Music ===
In 2009, Scarnici released his debut collection of comedic dance tracks, entitled 12 Inch Freak, which features the single "Gimme More (Pills)", a parody of Britney Spears's hit "Gimme More".

He also produces house music, released under his own name and also with Joe Thompson, under the name Undercover. Their self-titled debut album was released in 2012, and their follow-up album, Night Beats, was released in 2015.

Scarnici also produces and releases music under his drag queen alter ego, Levonia, including the single "So Cunt" which was called The Song of the Summer on Jezebel.com, Slate.com and PaperMag.com.
