= Ludachristmas =

- 30 Rock episode
- Episode no.: Season 2 Episode 9
- Directed by: Don Scardino
- Written by: Tami Sagher
- Cinematography by: Vanja Černjul
- Production code: 209
- Original air date: December 13, 2007

Guest appearances
- Kevin Brown as Dot Com Slattery; Kay Cannon as Human Table; Grizz Chapman as Grizz Griswold; Anita Gillette as Margaret Lemon; Buck Henry as Dick Lemon; John Lutz as L.D. Lutz; Maulik Pancholy as Jonathan; Andy Richter as Mitch Lemon; Elaine Stritch as Colleen Donaghy

Episode chronology
← Previous "Secrets and Lies"	Next → "Episode 210"
- 30 Rock season 2

"Ludachristmas" is the ninth episode of the second season of the television series 30 Rock and was first broadcast on December 13, 2007, on the NBC network in the United States.

The episode was written by Tami Sagher and directed by Don Scardino. Guest stars in this episode include Kevin Brown, Kay Cannon, Grizz Chapman, Anita Gillette, Buck Henry, John Lutz, Maulik Pancholy, Andy Richter, and Elaine Stritch.

In this episode, Liz Lemon's (Tina Fey) family (Anita Gillette, Buck Henry, and Andy Richter) visit her for the holidays and Jack Donaghy's (Alec Baldwin) mother, Colleen Donaghy (Elaine Stritch), also visits him for the holidays. The cast and writers of TGS with Tracy Jordan, a fictional sketch comedy series, prepare to attend their annual Ludachristmas party. Tracy Jordan (Tracy Morgan) is ordered by a court to wear an alcohol-monitoring device.

== Plot ==
Jack is delighted when he thinks his mother, Colleen, is unable to visit him for the holidays due to her flight from Florida being grounded by Hurricane Zapato. Unexpectedly, Colleen arrives because she was able to travel by bus to Atlanta and get a flight from there. Also arriving at 30 Rockefeller Plaza is Liz's family, including her brother Mitch who as the result of a skiing accident has "Trauma Induced Nivea Aphasia" which means that his memory is stuck on December 7, 1985, and he believes that he is still 17 years old, when he is actually 40. Jack's mother immediately dislikes the Lemons due to their constant optimism and happiness. Colleen sets out to show Jack that they're just as screwed up as their relationship is. Jack, Colleen, and the Lemons spend the day together and eventually end up going to dinner with each other. At the dinner, Colleen comments that it appears that Liz is the "favorite" child leading Mitch to reveal that his parents, Dick and Margaret, took him to see The Goonies in 1985 when they should have been watching Liz at her football game. Liz then gets into an argument with her parents, culminating in her revealing Mitch's real age, causing him to remember his accident. The Lemons then spiral into a drunken fight, unknowingly falling for Colleen's plan.

Meanwhile, the cast and writers of TGS are preparing their annual Ludachristmas party in the writer's room, which will involve a heavy amount of debauchery. Tracy is annoyed because he is unable to attend due to a recent order from a courtroom judge which requires him to wear an alcohol-monitoring ankle bracelet. Kenneth Parcell (Jack McBrayer) is also annoyed because he believes that none of the staff know what the true meaning of Christmas is. He cancels Ludachristmas and makes the staff sit through a talk, led by himself and Reverend Gary (John F Mooney), about the meaning of Christmas. Overwhelmed with regret and self-sacrifice after Reverend Gary shows them a video of him giving happy kids pieces of wood for Christmas, the cast and writers are inspired to run outside of 30 Rock and cut down the big Christmas tree which is outside the building. Kenneth eventually stops their efforts and Tracy reveals that he has been drinking alcohol when he should not have been. Despite this, he is not arrested due to the cops monitoring him being too drunk from their own party to notice.

The episode ends with the TGS cast and crew celebrating Christmas together, and with Jack saying to Colleen "Merry Christmas, Mother" at the Christmas dinner with the still arguing Lemons, revealing that he's happy to see that the Lemons aren't so perfect after all.

== Production ==
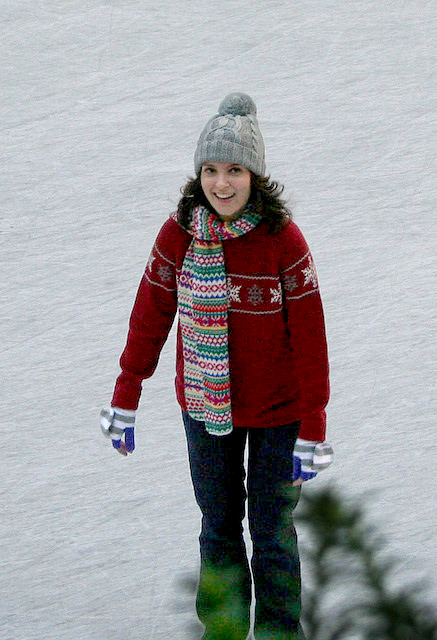
Tina Fey filming scenes of this episode at Rockefeller Center

The storyline in this episode, which features Tracy having to wear an ankle bracelet to monitor alcohol levels in his sweat due to a driving under the influence arrest, is based on events which actually happened to actor Tracy Morgan, who portrays Tracy Jordan. Morgan has twice been arrested for drunk driving: once in December 2005 and once in November 2006. He was sentenced to 36 months probation, fined US$390, and mandated to attend an alcohol education program at the 2005 arrest. As a result of the 2006 arrest, Morgan was fined US$1000 and had his drivers license suspended for six months. Morgan was also ordered to wear a Secure Continuous Remote Alcohol Monitoring (SCRAM), "an ankle bracelet worn to test for alcohol vapors that come out of the skin".

NBC billed this episode on its press releases as "Episode 209". The episode had been unofficially titled "Ludachristmas", until it was confirmed by the second season DVD. Similarly, the following episode also remains unnamed and is officially known as "Episode 210".

Kay Cannon, a writer for 30 Rock, appears in this episode as a Human Table at the Ludachristmas party. Cannon previously appeared as an unnamed wife character in "Fireworks", an episode of the first season. Cannon co-wrote "The Head and the Hair", an episode of the first season, and "Somebody to Love", an episode of the second season. Both episodes were co-written with the series creator, Tina Fey.

== Reception ==
The episode brought in an average 5.6 million American viewers upon its original broadcast in the United States, achieving a 2.8/7 in the key 18- to 49-year-old demographic. The 2.8 refers to 2.8% of all people of ages 18–49 years old, and the 7 refers to 7% of all people of ages 18–49 years old watching television at the time of the broadcast. It ranked second place in the 18–49 demographic and tied with CBS's CSI: Crime Scene Investigation episode "Lying Down With Dogs" for first place among men aged 18–49.

Matt Webb Mitovich of TV Guide wrote that "it's hard to make a 'true meaning of Christmas' story seem fresh. That's why this week's Kenneth/No LudaChristmas bit was a bit lame, in my opinion", although he did say "the A story [featuring Jack and Liz's respective families] fared a bit better". Bob Sassone of AOL's TV Squad thought that this episode was "a modern, irreverent look at [Christmas]". Jeff Labrecque of Entertainment Weekly thought that Buck Henry and Andy Richter were both "destined to play" their roles. He also wrote that "[Elaine] Stritch wasn't as brilliant as she's been in previous appearances, but she's always welcome, simply because her character riles Jack." Robert Canning of IGN wrote that this episode "had all the trimmings for a holiday classic, though it fell just shy of that pantheon." He added that "this may not have been the 30 Rock holiday classic people were hoping for, but it was a solid, funny episode nonetheless." Canning rated this episode 8 out of 10.

Elaine Stritch was nominated for the Primetime Emmy Award for Outstanding Guest Actress in a Comedy Series for this episode.
