= 30 Rock season 2 =

30 Rock
- Season 2
- DVD cover
- Starring: Tina Fey; Tracy Morgan; Jane Krakowski; Jack McBrayer; Scott Adsit; Judah Friedlander; Alec Baldwin; Katrina Bowden; Keith Powell; Lonny Ross
- No. of episodes: 15

Release
- Original network: NBC
- Original release: October 4, 2007 – May 8, 2008

Season chronology
- ← Previous; Season 1 Next → Season 3

The second season of 30 Rock, an American television comedy series, originally aired between October 4, 2007, and May 8, 2008, on NBC in the United States.

The second season of the show received overwhelmingly positive reviews from critics, with some calling it the best show on television. The season was nominated for 17 Emmy Awards, a number that broke the record for the most nominations for a comedy series, meaning that 30 Rock was the most nominated comedy series for any individual Emmy year in history.

It was originally set to include 22 episodes, but due to the 2007–2008 Writers Guild of America strike, it was shortened to 15 episodes. The 30 Rock season two DVD box set was released in Region 1 on October 7, 2008, and subsequently released in regions 2 and 4.

== Synopsis ==
Season two begins with Liz and the crew of TGS returning from summer hiatus to many problems. An immediate problem is Jack being threatened by Jerry Seinfeld because Jack was planning to digitally insert Seinfeld into all of NBC's programming with edited footage from Seinfeld's sitcom Seinfeld.

The second season, much like the first season, includes various plotlines including Jenna Maroney (Jane Krakowski) coping with her obesity problem which she developed during the summer while performing on the fictitious Broadway musical Mystic Pizza: The Musical. Another story arc includes the conservative Jack dating the Democratic congresswoman Celeste Cunningham (D-VT) (Edie Falco). Liz's attempts at recovering from her failed reunion with Floyd are also viewed as well as Tracy trying to deal with his failing marriage to Angie Jordan (Sherri Shepherd). Later, Tracy attempts to finish his masterpiece invention, a pornographic videogame.

As the season progresses, Jack and his rival Devon Banks (Will Arnett) both aspire to become the Chairman of GE. When about to announce that Jack will be his successor, Don Geiss (Rip Torn), the current Chairman of GE, slips into a diabetic coma. Taking advantage of this opportunity, Devon places his fiancée, Don's daughter, Kathy Geiss (Marceline Hugot) as the puppet GE Chairwoman.

== Production ==
The season was produced by Broadway Video, Little Stranger, Inc., and Universal Media Studios (also known as NBCUniversal) and was aired on NBC, a terrestrial television network in the United States of America. The executive producers were creator Tina Fey, Lorne Michaels, JoAnn Alfano, Marci Klein, David Miner, and Robert Carlock with Jack Burditt and John Riggi acting as co-executive producers. Producers for the season were music composer Jeff Richmond, Matt Hubbard, and Don Scardino with Diana Schmidt, Margo A. Myers and Irene Burns acting as co-producers.

There were six different directors throughout the season. Those who directed more than one episode were Don Scardino, Michael Engler and Beth McCarthy. There were three directors who only directed one episode each throughout the season, they were Richard Shepard, Kevin Rodney Sullivan, and Gail Mancuso. The main writers for the season were Tina Fey, Robert Carlock, Matt Hubbard, Jack Burditt and John Riggi, who all wrote, or co-wrote at least two episodes. Jon Pollack, Kay Cannon, Ron Weiner, Tami Sagher, Donald Glover, and Andrew Guest only wrote, or co-wrote, one episode each.

In July 2007, Fey talked to the Philadelphia Daily News about the show's second season, explaining some changes she had in mind:

I would really like to try to live in the world of the characters we've created for a little bit. We had a lot of great guest stars last year, but I also feel like there's a lot we could explore with the characters that we have. And I'd like to leave a little breathing room in the show, to let viewers keep up a little. I feel like sometimes it was a little too dense, the shows last year. In a way, [it was] the thing that made Arrested Development so great, but I wonder if it will help new viewers come to the show if it's a little less packed.

The season was affected by the 2007–2008 Writers Guild of America strike, which began on November 5, 2007, and ended on February 12, 2008. The season's show runners Tina Fey and Robert Carlock publicly committed to honor the strike themselves and to not ask their writers to do otherwise. As a result, only 15 episodes of the 22 episodes ordered could be produced.

== Cast ==
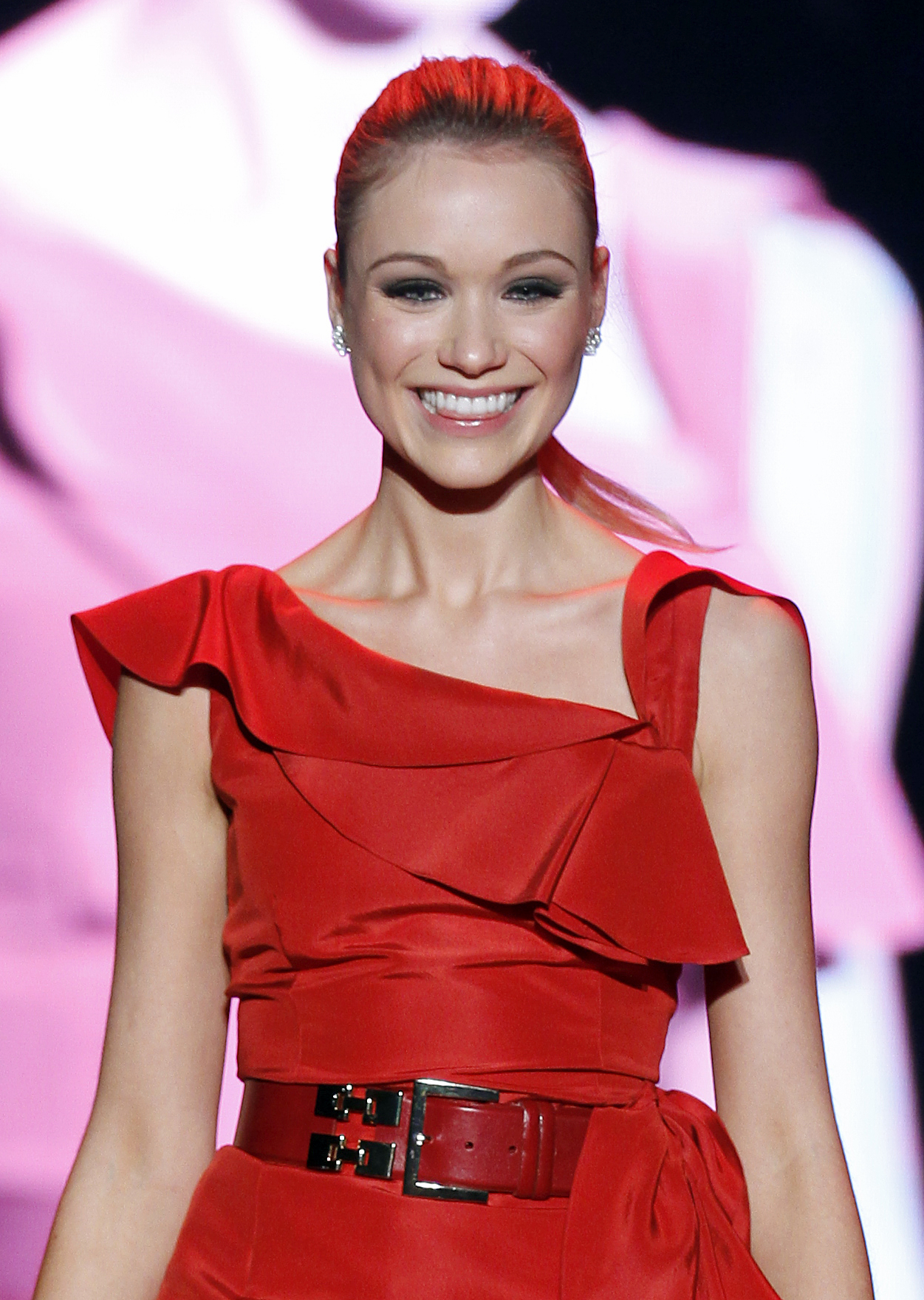
Katrina Bowden, who guest starred as Cerie Xerox during season one, received star billing in season two.

The second season had a cast of ten actors who received star billing. Tina Fey portrayed Liz Lemon, the head writer of a fictitious live sketch comedy television series named TGS with Tracy Jordan (commonly known as just TGS). The TGS cast consists of three actors. The lead actor is the loose cannon movie star Tracy Jordan, portrayed by Tracy Morgan. The co-stars are the dense, limelight-craving Jenna Maroney, portrayed by Jane Krakowski as well as the playful Josh Girard, who is also a writer for TGS, portrayed by Lonny Ross. Jack McBrayer played the naïve Kenneth Parcell. Scott Adsit acted as the witty and wise TGS producer, Pete Hornberger. Judah Friedlander portrayed the wise-cracking, trucker hat wearing, repulsive staff writer Frank Rossitano. Alec Baldwin played the high flying NBC network executive Jack Donaghy. Donaghy's full corporate title for the majority of the season is "Head of East Coast Television and Microwave Oven Programming." Keith Powell played the Harvard University alumnus and TGS staff writer Toofer Spurlock. Katrina Bowden acted as writers' assistant Cerie Xerox. The cast also included some recurring characters including Maulik Pancholy as Jonathan, Grizz Chapman as Grizz Griswold, Kevin Brown as "Dot Com" Slattery, John Lutz as J.D. Lutz, and Chris Parnell as Dr. Leo Spaceman.

=== Main cast ===
- Tina Fey as Liz Lemon, the head writer of TGS, a live sketch comedy television show. (15 episodes)
- Tracy Morgan as Tracy Jordan, a loose cannon movie star and cast member of TGS. (15 episodes)
- Jane Krakowski as Jenna Maroney, a vain, fame-obsessed TGS cast member and Liz's best friend. (12 episodes)
- Jack McBrayer as Kenneth Parcell, a naïve, television-loving NBC page from Georgia. (15 episodes)
- Scott Adsit as Pete Hornberger, the witty and wise producer of TGS. (12 episodes)
- Judah Friedlander as Frank Rossitano, an immature staff writer for TGS. (13 episodes)
- Alec Baldwin as Jack Donaghy, a high-flying NBC network executive and Liz's mentor. (15 episodes)
- Katrina Bowden as Cerie Xerox, the young, attractive TGS general assistant. (8 episodes)
- Keith Powell as James "Toofer" Spurlock, a proud African-American staff writer for TGS. (8 episodes)
- Lonny Ross as Josh Girard, a young, unintelligent TGS cast member. (6 episodes)

=== Recurring cast ===
- Maulik Pancholy as Jonathan, Jack's assistant who is obsessed with him. (13 episodes)
- Kevin Brown as Walter "Dot Com" Slattery, a member of Tracy's entourage. (12 episodes)
- Grizz Chapman as Warren "Grizz" Griswold, a member of Tracy's entourage. (9 episodes)
- John Lutz as J.D. Lutz, a lazy, overweight TGS writer who is often ridiculed by his co-workers. (7 episodes)
- Edie Falco as Celeste "C.C." Cunningham, a Democratic congresswoman who enters into a romantic relationship with Jack. (4 episodes)
- Marceline Hugot as Kathy Geiss, Don Geiss' socially awkward middle-aged daughter. (4 episodes)
- Rip Torn as Don Geiss, CEO of GE and Jack's boss and mentor. (3 episodes)
- Will Arnett as Devon Banks, NBC's Vice President of West Coast News, Web Content and Theme Park Talent Relations and Jack's nemesis. (2 episodes)
- Chris Parnell as Dr. Leo Spaceman, a physician who practices questionable medical techniques. (2 episodes)
- Paul Scheer as Donny Lawson, the head page at 30 Rockefeller Plaza who has a vendetta against Kenneth. (2 episodes)
- Sherri Shepherd as Angie Jordan, Tracy's no-nonsense wife. (2 episodes)
- Dean Winters as Dennis Duffy, Liz's immature ex-boyfriend. (2 episodes)

=== Guest stars ===
- Fred Armisen as Raheem Haddad, Liz's neighbor who she suspects of being a terrorist. (Episode: "Somebody to Love")
- Michael Bloomberg as himself (Episode: "Subway Hero")
- Matthew Broderick as Cooter Burger/James Riley, a government employee and political lobbyist. (Episode: "Cooter")
- Steve Buscemi as Lenny Wosniak, a private investigator hired by Jack. (Episode: "The Collection")
- James Carville as himself (Episode: "Secrets and Lies")
- Tim Conway as Bucky Bright, a forgotten television star and idol of Kenneth's. (Episode: "Subway Hero")
- Brian Dennehy as Mickey J, the leader of the Teamsters at TGS. (Episode: "Sandwich Day")
- Val Emmich as Jamie, a young TGS coffee boy who Liz dates. (Episode: "Cougars")
- Carrie Fisher as Rosemary Howard, a comedy writer and Liz's childhood idol. (Episode: "Rosemary's Baby")
- Anita Gillette as Margaret Lemon, Liz's mother. (Episode: "Ludachristmas")
- Al Gore as himself (Episode: "Greenzo")
- Buck Henry as Dick Lemon, Liz's father. (Episode: "Ludachristmas")
- Edward Herrmann as Walter, the head of the co-op board of an apartment Liz wants to purchase. (Episode: "Episode 210")
- Rob Huebel as the host of the reality-television show MILF Island. (Episode: "MILF Island")
- Gladys Knight as herself (Episode: "Episode 210")
- Jackie Mason as himself (Episode: "The Collection")
- Paula Pell as Paula Hornberger, Pete's wife. (Episode: "Greenzo")
- Andy Richter as Mitch Lemon, Liz's brother who suffers from severe memory loss. (Episode: "Ludachristmas")
- David Schwimmer as Greenzo/Jared, an environmental mascot for NBC. (Episode: "Greenzo")
- Jerry Seinfeld as himself (Episode: "SeinfeldVision")
- Reshma Shetty as Party Attendant (Episode: "Secrets and Lies")
- Elaine Stritch as Colleen Donaghy, Jack's cold and overbearing mother. (Episode: "Ludachristmas")
- Jason Sudeikis as Floyd DeBarber, Liz's former boyfriend. (Episode: "Sandwich Day")
- Meredith Viera as herself (Episode: "Greenzo")
- Kristen Wiig as Candace Van der Shark, an actress who portrayed C.C. in a Lifetime movie. (Episode: "Somebody to Love")

== Episodes ==
During its second season, 30 Rock moved time slots three times. All episodes aired on a Thursday, but with the first eight episodes airing 8:30 pm Eastern Standard Time (EST), the ninth episode airing at 9:00 pm EST, episode ten through twelve airing at 8:30 pm EST, and the final three episodes airing at 9:30 pm EST.

No. overall	No. in season	Title	Directed by	Written by	Original release date	Prod. code	U.S. viewers (millions)
22	1	"SeinfeldVision"	Don Scardino	Tina Fey	October 4, 2007	201	7.33
Jack invents "SeinfeldVision", which digitally inserts Jerry Seinfeld into every NBC show, but things get sticky when Seinfeld himself appears to complain about how his likeness is being used without his consent. Meanwhile, Jenna returns from hiatus overweight due to her role in Mystic Pizza: The Musical; Tracy's wife Angie Jordan (Sherri Shepherd) kicks him out of the house, prompting Kenneth to become his "office wife", and Liz deals with her break-up with Floyd.
23	2	"Jack Gets in the Game"	Michael Engler	Robert Carlock	October 11, 2007	202	6.60
Jack hears that Don Geiss (Rip Torn) may be retiring and competes with Devon Banks (Will Arnett) to be Geiss' successor. Meanwhile, Jenna begins to enjoy the fame of being fat and Kenneth tries to get Tracy and Angie back together.
24	3	"The Collection"	Don Scardino	Matt Hubbard	October 18, 2007	203	6.22
Jack hires a private investigator (Steve Buscemi), to find any dirt GE might dig up on him. Meanwhile, Angie decides that she will be with Tracy every moment to keep him out of trouble and Jenna is upset to find that she has started losing weight.
25	4	"Rosemary's Baby"	Michael Engler	Jack Burditt	October 25, 2007	204	6.50
Liz meets her childhood idol, comedy writer Rosemary Howard (Carrie Fisher) and makes her a guest writer on The Girlie Show, only to discover that Rosemary's sense of humor is wildly out of step with the times and that defending Rosemary and her creative freedom may cost Liz her job. Meanwhile, Jack orders Tracy to go to therapy after Tracy defies Jack's order to not get involved in dogfighting, and Kenneth is forced to compete in a "page-off" to keep his job after Jenna asks the head page (Paul Scheer) for a new jacket.
26	5	"Greenzo"	Don Scardino	Jon Pollack	November 8, 2007	205	6.60
Jack introduces NBC's environmental mascot, Greenzo (David Schwimmer), but Greenzo's eco-friendly preaching gets out of hand around the TGS offices, as well as on The Today Show. Meanwhile, Liz thinks Pete is cheating on his wife, Paula (Paula Pell) and Tracy tries to make Kenneth the Page's party the social event of the year by spreading rumors about who's going to be there.
27	6	"Somebody to Love"	Beth McCarthy	Tina Fey & Kay Cannon	November 15, 2007	206	6.45
Jack falls for a Democratic congresswoman named C.C. (Edie Falco). Meanwhile, Liz thinks her new neighbor, Raheem (Fred Armisen), is a terrorist.
28	7	"Cougars"	Michael Engler	John Riggi	November 29, 2007	207	5.82
Liz goes on a date with a 20-year-old coffee delivery boy named Jamie (Val Emmich) and worries about the age difference. Meanwhile, Tracy is sentenced to coach an inner-city Little League team as part of his community service, and Jack ends up usurping Tracy's position as coach.
29	8	"Secrets and Lies"	Michael Engler	Ron Weiner	December 6, 2007	208	5.84
Jack is very reluctant when C.C. wants to go public with their relationship. Meanwhile, Liz tries to keep Jenna and Tracy equally as happy leading Tracy to earn a fake Pacific Rim Emmy Award and Jenna to form an entourage.
30	9	"Ludachristmas"	Don Scardino	Tami Sagher	December 13, 2007	209	5.58
It's time for the annual "Ludachristmas" party for the TGS staff. Tracy is upset because he cannot participate in the party due to a court-ordered alcohol-monitoring bracelet. The Lemon family pays Liz a visit, as does Jack's mom (Elaine Stritch) to him.
31	10	Episode 210	Richard Shepard	Robert Carlock & Donald Glover	January 10, 2008	210	5.98
Jack meets a German TV executive planning to buy a major cable TV network. Meanwhile, Jack gives Liz financial advice, which motivates her to invest in some real estate, but she must appear before a co-op board to buy the apartment she wants; Jack and C.C. continue their long-distance relationship; and Tracy buys a cappuccino machine for TGS, which gets a lot of use from Kenneth the Page.
32	11	"MILF Island"	Kevin Rodney Sullivan	Tina Fey & Matt Hubbard	April 10, 2008	212	5.77
The TGS writers tune in to see who wins on the Survivor-esque reality show MILF Island, but their viewing party gets interrupted when Jack locks them outside his office until one of them confesses to calling him a "Class A Moron" in the business gossip section of The New York Post.
33	12	"Subway Hero"	Don Scardino	Jack Burditt & Robert Carlock	April 17, 2008	211	6.50
When Dennis Duffy (Dean Winters), Liz's ex-boyfriend, becomes New York's latest local celebrity, Jack books him to appear on TGS. Dennis tries to win Liz back into his life. Meanwhile, Jack wants to find a young, hip Republican celebrity to appear at a John McCain fundraiser. Jack can only secure Bucky Bright (Tim Conway), a TV star from the 1940s and 1950s. When Jack rejects him, he befriends Kenneth, who happens to be a fan. Instead of Bucky, Jack tries to convince Tracy to become the celebrity face of the Republican Party.
34	13	"Succession"	Gail Mancuso	Andrew Guest & John Riggi	April 24, 2008	213	5.52
Don Geiss names Jack the new GE chairman over Jack's rival, Devon Banks. Jack then names Liz as his successor, as "Vice President of East Coast Television and Microwave Oven Programming," because she "always has his back." While Liz attempts to adjust to corporate life, Geiss' health puts Jack's promotion in jeopardy. Meanwhile, Tracy, upset that his son did not invite him to Bring Your Dad to School Day, decides to leave his kids a legacy by creating a pornographic video game.
35	14	"Sandwich Day"	Don Scardino	Robert Carlock & Jack Burditt	May 1, 2008	214	5.38
Liz's ex-boyfriend Floyd (Jason Sudeikis) contacts Liz looking for a place to stay. Jack gets demoted to the 12th floor, while Liz is furious that her sandwich is stolen on TGS's Annual Sandwich Day.
36	15	"Cooter"	Don Scardino	Tina Fey	May 8, 2008	215	5.45
Jack gets a job in politics. When the job is not what he expected he schemes with another government employee, Cooter (Matthew Broderick), to get fired. Jack also enlists the help of C.C., his ex-girlfriend. Meanwhile, Liz thinks she may be pregnant. Kenneth aspires to be an NBC page at the Beijing Olympics, but Donny Lawson (Paul Scheer), the head page, is not prepared to let that happen. Tracy's invention is nearly complete.

== Reception ==
=== Critical reception ===
On Rotten Tomatoes, the season has an approval rating of 95% with an average score of 8.7 out of 10 based on 20 reviews. The website's critical consensus reads, "30 Rock's return not only avoids the pitfalls of a sophomore season, but finds the series hitting its jubilant stride with a trove of quips and ingenious gags." The second season of the show received overwhelmingly positive reviews from television critics, with Gillian Flynn of Entertainment Weekly ranking it the greatest television season of 2007–2008. In his review of the season, Robert Canning of IGN said that this season was "smart, funny and thoroughly entertaining". He also praised many of the guest stars who appeared throughout the season. Regarding the main cast, Canning wrote that "the regulars all seemed to up their game in this second season", particularly praising Fey's portrayal of Liz Lemon, calling her "the heart of the show." Canning ranked the season 8.9 out of 10. John Kubicek of BuddyTV felt that the series had "learned from its mistakes and now knows what works and what doesn't". He praised the main cast, and also thought that the supporting cast had been refined. Kubicek enjoyed Tracy's pairing with Kenneth, and Jenna's subplot, as he felt actress Krakowski was the weakest link from the first season. Alistair Harkness of The Scotsman described the season as "hilarious and absurd", and wrote that "each character's personality is to the forefront in a way not seen since the heyday of Seinfeld". Harkness said the writing was sharp and the jokes were magnificent, "with plenty of quotable dialogue", but felt "what's truly heartening is that it's the regular cast that carries the comedy". The A.V. Club reviewed more than half the season's episodes with a perfect "A" grade.

=== Ratings ===
The season premiere, "SeinfeldVision," garnered 7.33 million American viewers, placing it third in its timeslot of 8:30 pm EST. On December 13, 2007, "Episode 209" aired at 9:00 pm EST and it was viewed by 5.6 million viewers. Upon returning to its 8:30 pm EST timeslot on January 10, 2008, the episode which aired, "Episode 210," was viewed by 6 million viewers. 30 Rock was moved to 9:30 pm EST on April 24, 2007 and began airing after The Office. The season's first airing at 9:30 pm EST garnered 5.52 million viewers. The following week, the lowest rated episode of the season, "Sandwich Day," aired. The episode was viewed by 5.4 million viewers. The season finale, "Cooter," which aired on May 8, 2008, was viewed by 5.6 million viewers. The second season averaged 6.4 million viewers for all 15 episodes, excluding repeat broadcasts.

=== Awards ===
Tina Fey picked up a Golden Globe Award, the category of Best Performance by an Actress in a Television Series – Comedy or Musical, for her portrayal of Liz Lemon. Both Fey and Alec Baldwin received Screen Actors Guild Awards, in the categories of Outstanding Performance by a Female Actor in a Comedy Series and Outstanding Performance by a Male Actor in a Comedy Series, respectively. The season also received the Writers Guild of America Award for Best Comedy Series, as well as The Danny Thomas Producer of the Year Award in Episodic Series – Comedy from the Producers Guild of America. 30 Rock received 17 Emmy nominations, for its second season, meaning it was the second most nominated series of the year. These 17 nominations broke the record for the most nominations for a comedy series, meaning that 30 Rock was the most nominated comedy series for any individual Emmy year. The previous holder of this record was The Larry Sanders Show in 1996 with 16 nominations. 30 Rock also won the Television Critics Association Award for "Outstanding Achievement in Comedy." The series also received a George Foster Peabody Award during its second season, with the Peabody board saying "True or false, accurate or exaggerated, recalled from experience or just plain made up, 30 Rock is as funny, or funnier, than the show it pretends to be producing."

== DVD releases ==
Region 1	Region 2	Region 4	Discs	Extras
October 7, 2008	May 25, 2009	January 8, 2009	3	Episode commentaries, Outtakes, Deleted scenes, The table read for the episode "Cooter," 30 Rock Live at the UCB Theatre, a behind-the-scenes look at an episode of Saturday Night Live which was hosted by Tina Fey, and The Academy of Television Arts & Sciences Presents: An Evening With 30 Rock.
