= Greenzo =

- 30 Rock episode
- Episode no.: Season 2 Episode 5
- Directed by: Don Scardino
- Written by: Jon Pollack
- Cinematography by: Vanja Černjul
- Production code: 205
- Original air date: November 8, 2007

Guest appearances
- Kevin Brown as Dot Com Slattery; Grizz Chapman as Grizz Griswold; Al Gore as himself; John Lutz as J.D. Lutz; Maulik Pancholy as Jonathan; David Schwimmer as Jared/Greenzo; Meredith Vieira as herself

Episode chronology
← Previous "Rosemary's Baby"	Next → "Somebody to Love"
- 30 Rock season 2

"Greenzo" is the fifth episode of NBC's second season of 30 Rock and twenty-sixth episode overall. It was written by Jon Pollack and directed by series producer Don Scardino. It aired on November 8, 2007 in the United States. Guest stars in this episode include Kevin Brown, Grizz Chapman, Al Gore, John Lutz, Madison McKinley Garton, Maulik Pancholy, Paula Pell, Dion Sapp, David Schwimmer and Meredith Vieira.

The episode focuses on Jack Donaghy's (played by Alec Baldwin) success, and later disaster, with Greenzo (David Schwimmer), "America's first non-judgmental, business-friendly environmental advocate." Kenneth Parcell (Jack McBrayer) decides to throw a party, but, knowing that nobody will attend, Liz Lemon (Tina Fey) and Tracy Jordan (Tracy Morgan) plot to make the party a success. Jenna Maroney (Jane Krakowski) and Liz suspect that Pete Hornberger (Scott Adsit) is having an affair.

== Plot ==
Don Geiss, the chairman of General Electric (GE), challenges Jack and his rivals to come up with an idea to make money "from this environmentalism trend." This leads to him casting an actor called Jared to play Greenzo, NBC's environmental mascot. Initially, Greenzo is a success, making a well received appearance on The Today Show with Meredith Vieira. Eventually, he becomes more and more self-absorbed and starts insulting the TGS staff and criticizing the staff's environmentally unfriendly habits. This is until he conducts a second interview, when he begins ranting negatively about "big companies and their two-faced, fat-cat executives," referring to GE and Jack. Angered, Jack fires Jared and tries tricking Al Gore into replacing him to no avail. Also, a drunken Greenzo shows up and tries to continue, only to cause a giant globe to hit a stage light and catch on fire. Liz cries out, "Okay, this Earth is ruined. We need a new one."

Meanwhile, Kenneth is planning a party. Knowing this, Liz recounts past parties of Kenneth's to Tracy, telling him that she was the only other person who attended those parties because of how cornball they are (the first one had Liz forced to listen to Kenneth play the organ, the second one had Kenneth and Liz tap dancing, and the third was a Halloween party where Liz dressed up as Harry Potter while Kenneth was dressed up as Austin Powers, with Tracy Jordan's hit Halloween novelty song "Werewolf Bar Mitzvah" playing in the background). Feeling pity for Kenneth, Tracy tells the biggest gossips on TGS with Tracy Jordan, Grizz and Dot Com (Grizz Chapman and Kevin Brown), that T.I. will be attending. They persuade other people to attend by telling various other lies. Liz tries to get Tracy to stop it, but fails. The next day, Jack holds a meeting about the chaos that happened. Kenneth reprimands everyone about their debauched behavior and announces that he's never throwing another party at his apartment again.

When Liz finds another woman's lipstick in her apartment, she and Jenna begin to suspect that Pete, who is separated from his wife, is having an affair. Liz later discovers, much to her horror, that Pete is having an "affair" with his own wife, Paula Hornberger (Paula Pell), in Liz's apartment, due to Paula getting turned on by the "sneaking around". Later, Pete asks if he can still stay with Liz because for the first time, they have been able to date.

== Production ==
"Greenzo" is the first episode of 30 Rock written by Jon Pollack. Pollack was added to the writing staff of 30 Rock at the beginning of the second season. The episode is the ninth episode of 30 Rock directed by Don Scardino. This episode aired as part of Green Week, an initiative introduced by NBC's Chief Executive Jeff Zucker which included having every primetime program which aired between November 4, 2007 and November 10, 2007 contain some sort of positive environmental theme. This was also the first episode of 30 Rock to air after the start of the 2007–2008 Writers Guild of America strike. The strike began on November 5, 2007 and ended on February 12, 2008. This episode was filmed on September 27 and September 28, 2007.

== Reception ==
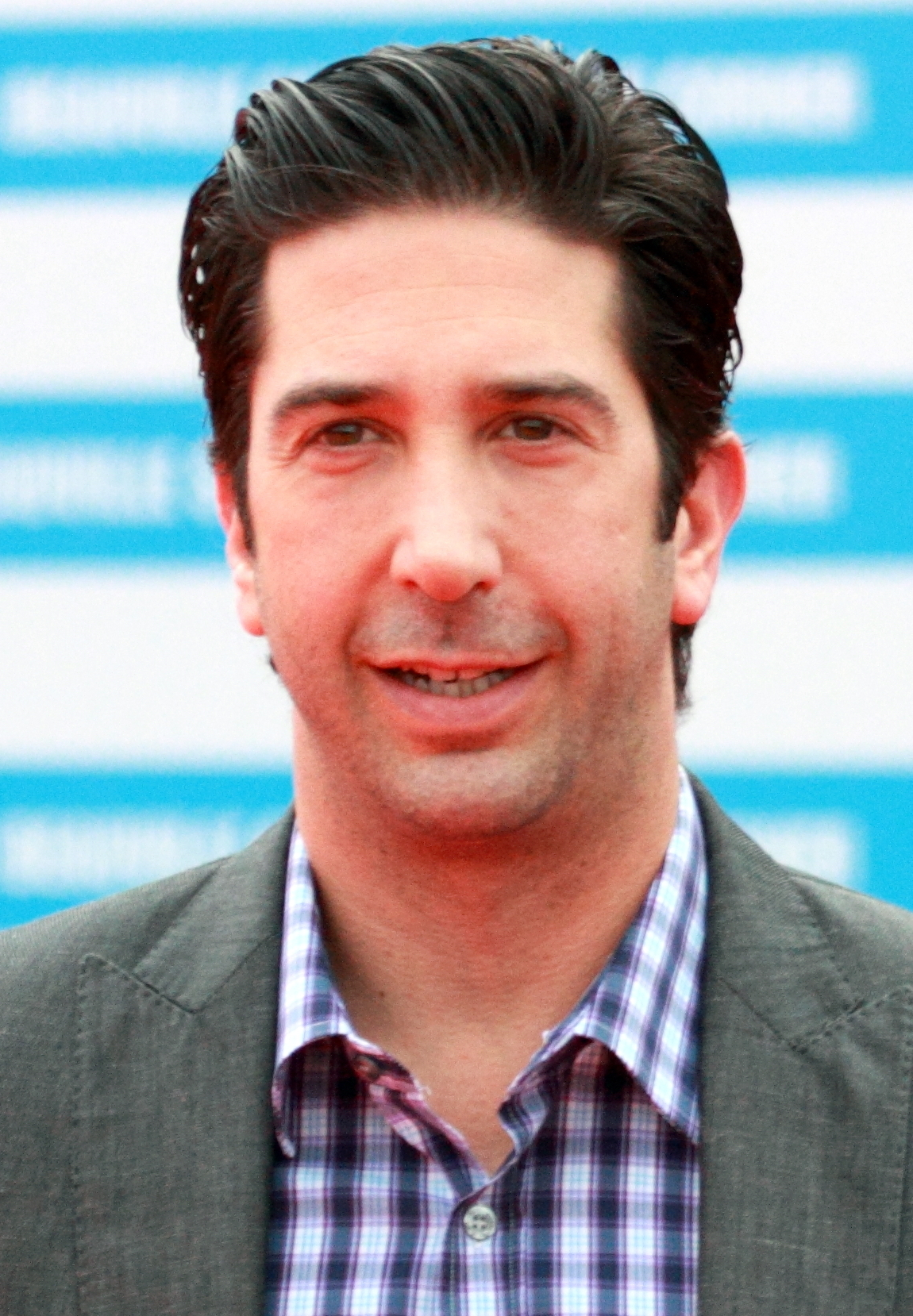
David Schwimmer's performance as Jared in this episode was mostly, although not universally, praised and enjoyed by critics.

"Greenzo" brought in an average of 6.6 million viewers, the highest number of viewers since the second season premiere, "SeinfeldVision". The episode also achieved a 3.1/8 in the key 18- to 49-year-old demographic, matching the series' highest rating in that demographic. The 3.1 refers to 3.1% of all 18- to 49-year-olds in the U.S. and the 8 refers to 8% of all 18- to 49-year-olds watching television at the time of the broadcast, in the U.S. This episode also ranked in first place in the men 18–34 demographic, against programs airing on other networks in the same timeslot.

Matt Webb Mitovich of TV Guide praised "David Schwimmer for throwing himself into this role" as Jared, "this rather unlikable lout." Webb Mitovich also wrote that "[Kenneth's] party in and of itself has to be one of 30 Rock's finest and most manic moments." Bob Sassone of AOL's TV Squad thought that "[David] Schwimmer was good as Greenzo" and that "the subplots were some of the most bizarre this season." Robert Canning of IGN thought that the "cameo from Al Gore at the end of the show added little to the episode. It was a fine bit, but it wasn't helped by the fact that nearly the entire scene had already aired in the promos leading up to the episode" and that "seeing [Schwimmer] desperately take on the role of Greenzo and then get carried away with the whole concept could have been hysterically self-referential [to his work on the situation comedy Friends]. Instead we got Jerrod [sic] as Greenzo and the whole thing just felt flat and forced." Canning rated the episode "8 out of 10" Pittsburgh Post-Gazette's Rob Owen also felt that Al Gore's appearance had been "already given away in [NBC's] promos". He praised the episode's dialogue, saying that Baldwin's line, "you could put on a silly hat and tell the kids how outsourcing means cheaper toys for Christmas" was the sort of dialogue that "makes 30 Rock rock. Hard." Jeff Labrecque of Entertainment Weekly wrote that this episode "was one of the best of season 2" and that "Schwimmer's performance reminded [him] of his most bizarre episodes as Friends' Ross Geller, like 'The One with Ross's Sandwich'."
