= Liz Lemon =

Fictional character on 30 Rock

- 30 Rock character
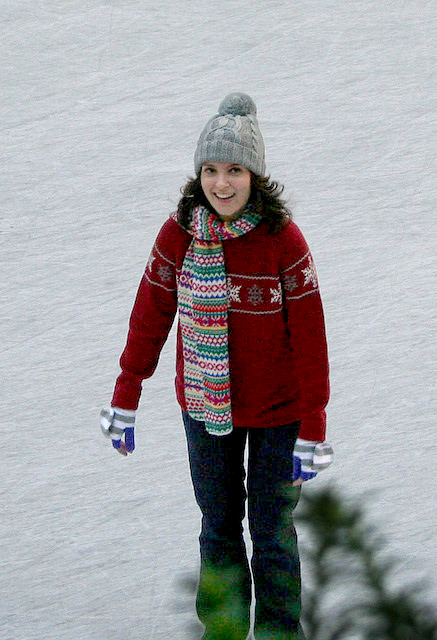
- Tina Fey in character as Liz Lemon while filming the episode "Ludachristmas"
- First appearance: "Pilot" (2006)
- Last appearance: "30 Rock: A One-Time Special" (2020)
- Created by: Tina Fey
- Portrayed by: Tina Fey

In-universe information
- Occupation: Head writer
- Family: Dick Lemon (father); Margaret Lemon (mother); Mitch Lemon (brother)

Elizabeth Miervaldis Lemon is a fictional character and the protagonist of the American television series 30 Rock. She created and wrote for the fictional comedy-sketch show The Girlie Show and later TGS with Tracy Jordan.

She is portrayed by Tina Fey, who is also the creator of the series and its showrunner. Fey received a Primetime Emmy Award, two Golden Globe Awards, four Screen Actors Guild Awards, and a Television Critics Association Award for her performance. She is also the first person to win a Critics' Choice, Golden Globe, Primetime Emmy, SAG, and TCA Award for a singular performance.

== Personal history ==
Liz Lemon was born on the 28th of November 1970. Raised in the town of White Haven, Pennsylvania, Liz is the daughter and second child to Dick Lemon and Margaret Lemon (née Freeman). Liz's parents are outwardly very optimistic and supportive of her, but privately they dislike many of their daughter's attributes and life decisions, as revealed during the climax of "Ludachristmas." On Saturday, December 6, 1985, she made her one appearance as a varsity football player, having forced her high school to lift the gender segregation rules of the team. Though her parents displayed a supportive demeanor, they were too embarrassed to attend her game despite claiming to have been present. Liz's elder brother, Mitch, was a victim of a skiing accident the following day, when he was a high school senior. Afterward, he experienced anterograde amnesia, remaining "stuck" in the day before the accident, thinking for the next 22 years that he was 17 years old and the year was still 1985. In the episode "The Moms", her mother is said to have worked as a secretary at Sterling Cooper and to have "repeatedly lost [her] virginity" to Buzz Aldrin while the town pervert watched from the bushes.

In the season 3 finale, "Kidney Now!", it is revealed that Liz attended elementary school with musician and actress Sheryl Crow, co-starring with her as one of a pair of kidneys in a 5th-grade musical. While Liz believes that the two were great friends, Crow only vaguely remembers her and refers to Liz as a "loser." Fey is in reality 8 years younger than Crow.

She first saw Jack Donaghy and Tracy Jordan, and spoke with Jack by telephone, in 1986 while watching a live telethon alone in her parents' basement on prom night. Immediately after church choir member Tracy fell and realized his talent for getting laughs as a performer, Liz placed a prank call to the pledge line, which was answered by Jack, then a young executive from GE's poisons division. Liz claimed to have been a nurse in the war, who was impregnated by General Electric when he was Colonel Electric. Jack's loyalty to GE and his handsomeness impressed Don Geiss, who transferred Jack to the microwave ovens division.

Liz was inspired to become a writer by Rosemary Howard, the first female head writer of Laugh-In. She mentioned that she used to teach improv to senior citizens. In high school, Liz believed she was an unpopular "nerd" that all of her classmates picked on, only to learn two decades later at her 20-year high school reunion that she was, in fact, the universally disliked class bully. She attended the University of Maryland on a partial competitive jazz dance scholarship, studying theater tech for which she still has an outstanding student loan. She spent her junior year abroad in Frankfurt, Germany, and speaks passable German, which is, in her opinion, "the most beautiful language in the world". She struggles somewhat with the language in "Episode 210", mixing up verbs and misunderstanding a group of German TV executives. In "Gentleman's Intermission" she tries to evade speaking with Avery Jessup on the phone by pretending to be German, but is caught when Avery speaks fluent German in response. In "Larry King", she sings "99 Luftballons". Liz also has a longtime goal of learning Spanish, at which she eventually makes some progress during a period of community service in "Respawn."

In the episodes "Believe in the Stars" and "Cooter", Liz states that she did not lose her virginity until she was 25 (this would be in 1995 or 1996).

Liz met Jenna Maroney in 1993 when Jenna was studying voice at Northwestern University. By Liz's own words, Jenna was "slutting it up" to get car dealership owners to put her in their commercials. The two shared an apartment in a Chicago neighborhood called "Little Armenia", and together they dreamed of "making it big". While in Chicago, Liz reportedly tried to be an actress, but the only job she was able to book was a phone sex line commercial. Liz and Jenna began The Girlie Show at Second City. They worked for years to turn The Girlie Show into a television series, which NBC picked up (though only to quell the outrage of women's groups over the misogynistic show Bitch Hunter), resulting in the pair moving to New York City for it. Liz became the head writer for The Girlie Show, while Jenna became the show's main star.

In the pilot, it is announced that Liz's former boss Gary has died and Jack Donaghy takes his place. Neither Jack nor Liz recognizes the other from their brief conversation twenty years earlier. Jack immediately decides to retool the show to make it appeal to a larger demographic, starting by firing Liz's trusted producer Pete Hornberger to make room in the budget to hire unpredictable actor Tracy Jordan as the show's new star. Liz manages to convince Jack to re-hire Pete, but Jack is insistent on making the show center around Tracy and, much to her chagrin, he renames the show TGS with Tracy Jordan.

Since 2005, Liz has lived in an apartment at 160 Riverside Drive (which changes to 168 Riverside Drive in later seasons; the building is fictional, but the address corresponds to the block between 88th and 89th Streets); her apartment number is 3B. When the building is converted to condominiums, Liz purchases both 3B and 4B with her earnings from Dealbreakers, with the encouragement of both Jack and Jenna. ("Sun Tea")

Liz has also evidently won at least one Emmy Award. In addition to her responsibilities behind the camera, Liz occasionally acts in TGS sketches.

Throughout the seasons, several people have questioned Liz's gender. She always replies that she is really a girl and "that doctor was a quack." She serves as best man at the weddings of both her former sex partner Grizz and her mentor Jack (accidentally marrying him in the process). When Gretchen Thomas tells Jack she thinks Liz looks like Jennifer Jason Leigh, Jack initially assumes she means Jason Lee. She also once demonstrated that she is easily able to grow a mustache (which she calls "Tom," about the actor Mr. Selleck) in less than 48 hours.

After TGS is canceled, Liz tries being a stay-at-home mother to her newly adopted children, while her husband Criss works as a dental receptionist. Both soon recognize that they are ill-suited to those roles and that Liz has considerably greater earning power. With Criss taking care of Terry and Janet, Liz takes over as producer of former lover Griz's series, Griz & Herz. The children visit her on set.

In the final episode, as a nod to St. Elsewhere's finale, "The Last One" (complete with a replica of the series' namesake building in a snow globe stared at by a mentally challenged male), Liz's life serves as the inspiration for a sitcom that is pitched by her great-granddaughter 100 years in the future. The series is green-lighted by immortal NBC president Kenneth Parcell ("Last Lunch") – even though the series includes every one of the banned features on the list that Kenneth gave to Liz when beginning his tenure in "Hogcock!"

== Personality ==
After a mere glance at her in the pilot, Jack sums up Liz as a "New York third-wave feminist, college-educated single-and-pretending-to-be-happy-about-it, over-scheduled, undersexed, you buy any magazine that says 'healthy body image' on the cover and every two years you take up knitting for...a week." This is confirmed by Pete to be accurate, commenting that the "knitting" part, in particular, was uncanny.

Liz is generally portrayed as something of a "geek." So, while she is a skilled writer, she seems to have very few social skills (in "Rosemary's Baby", Jack describes her as "socially retarded"). For example, while she was trying to pick up men at a karaoke bar, a man asked her if the seat next to her was taken, leading her to ask him why she should have to move her coat just so he could sit there. Liz is often shown to be generally insecure and holds a strong concern for how she is perceived by others. Liz is sometimes dismissive of others, a personality flaw that can be connected to her lack of social skills. Assessing Liz's personality up to near the end of season 3, Jonah Weiner described her as "an eternal 13-year-old tomboy—scared of sex, obsessed with Star Wars and meatball subs" and as "cling[ing] to a fantasy of presexual, junk-food-munching adolescence".

Liz has a rather satirical sense of humor. She has frequently been shown to be a stress eater, a trait she shares with Jack. Even though she often ingests high amounts of junk food daily, she seems to keep her weight under control, perhaps because she does not seem to have proper meals. According to Fey, the character is not bulimic; "She just likes to eat". Liz does have some knowledge of cooking, though she admits to only using her oven to warm her jeans in the morning. She is allergic to both dogs and cats, as well as "anything warm and adorable." However, she does believe her allergy to dogs is psychosomatic, as she mentions that a dog bit her during the time of her first period.

Like Fey, Liz is a big fan of the Star Wars film franchise, often using events from the original trilogy to explain her feelings and actions in daily life. For example, in the episode "Jack the Writer", she compares Jack to the Sith lord Darth Vader, and contemplates that entering his office is like "stepping onto the Death Star". In "The Source Awards", Liz mentions that for the four past Halloweens in a row, she has dressed up as Princess Leia. She has also dressed as the character during jury selection to be disqualified from serving. Liz considers Attack of the Clones to be the worst film of the series. Criss Chros proved his love for her when responding to her "I love you", with "I know", quoting Han Solo's response to Leia in The Empire Strikes Back. Facing the improbability that she will ever have a daughter, Liz offers the child-sized Leia costume which she had bought sometime in the past, to Jack for his daughter Liddy. Eventually, in "Mazel Tov, Dummies!", Liz gets married wearing a Princess Leia dress with which she had replaced her earlier, highly flammable costume after inadvertently setting it alight in "The Funcooker". She imitates Yoda in response to Jack's lamentations in "Hogcock!"

She is also a fan of the television series Heroes, in which her favorite character is Hiro Nakamura, Lost, Little People, Big World, Ugly Betty, Top Chef, Designing Women, NCIS, The Real Housewives of New York City, and The Daily Show. Her favorite drink is white wine with ice cubes and Sprite, a blend she calls "Funky Juice." She is obsessed with men in green tights. As for "Cleveland", her ringtone is "Ride of the Valkyries", which she and Jenna consider a reference to What's Opera, Doc?. Her ringtone for "Future Husband" is "Fuck the Pain Away" by Peaches.

In the episode "The Fabian Strategy", Liz reveals that the three things she likes in the world are Ina Garten, "sweater weather," and when Muppets present at awards shows. Over the course of the series she has shown an aversion to exposing her feet under any circumstances, except when she mistakenly believed that Oprah Winfrey counted high-heeled flip-flops among her new "favorite things." She usually prefers sex to be either non-existent, fast or "only on Saturdays".

Liz appears to be a Philadelphia Phillies fan. In "Reaganing," it is mentioned that at nine years old, she sported a Pete Rose inspired haircut and had posters of Mike Schmidt and Tug McGraw in her bedroom. It is also noted that she uses a "Phillies Sport Wallet" in "It's Never Too Late For Now." In the season 6 finale "What Will Happen to the Gang Next Year?" Liz tells Jack that in payment for officiating at his and Avery's renewal of vows, "I get your Yankees tickets on A-Rod bobble head day. And I'm going to throw that thing in front of a train. Go Phillies!"

By "Christmas Attack Zone," Liz has learned the meanings of body language through watching The Mentalist (due to her losing the remote control to her television, thus being unable to change the CBS channel it was on). Because of her newfound talent, she dubs herself "The MentaLiz". She is unaware at that time that The Mentalist's original Dutch version, Van der Hoot: Psychische (De Mentalist), was based upon Liz's subordinate Sue LaRoche-Van der Hout's former career as a police psychic.

In contrast with her friend and foil Jenna, Liz seems to have little interest in stereotypical female interests, such as fashion. In "Blind Date", her "bi-curious" shoes led Jack to erroneously believe she was gay, and set her up on a blind date with his friend Gretchen Thomas, the "brilliant plastics engineer/lesbian." Except when she is pressured to dress more femininely, Liz typically appears in casual, gender-neutral attire. In earlier episodes, she almost always wore plastic-rimmed glasses, though she started to wear them less frequently over the course of the series. Flashbacks reveal that she has worn glasses since she was around four or five years of age. However, according to Jenna in "The Rural Juror", she does not actually need glasses. (Tina Fey also does not need glasses, except to see far away.)

Some of Liz's social problems stem from past slapstick events that left her with long-suppressed traumas and phobias. For instance, in "Reaganing", Liz reveals to Jack that she once ended up falling while wearing roller skates and with her underwear around her ankles, while covered by a Tom Jones poster (all while she was trying to find a bathroom to use in her house). When Jack learns she also freaked out when hearing a snippet of music in Las Vegas, she realizes that anything that reminds her of Tom Jones triggers her revulsion to sex. She was also unable to eat eggs for a long time, and Kenneth's impromptu therapy helped her understand why: her aunt's husband left her, causing the aunt to feed a pre-teen Liz unappetizing egg-based dishes while making bizarre requests for company.

James Poniewozik of Time had this to say about an Indecent Proposal type situation involving a former classmate in the episode "Leap Day": "[T]his story is about more than that. It's about nerdy, neurotic Liz recognizing that she is, after all, a legitimate object of desire—a successful, smart woman who looks like Tina Fey—and embracing it rather than being freaked out by it."

Liz also has a tendency to say "blërg!" (the name of her home office furniture from IKEA), "nerds", "what the what?", "nertz", "nerf herder" (quoting Princess Leia in The Empire Strikes Back), "whuck?" and "son of a mother" as replacements for curse words; she has also notably used the phrases "shut it down", "I want to go to there", "deal-breaker", "pwomp", and "by the hammer of Thor!".

== Political and religious views ==
As demonstrated over the course of her appearances, Liz seems to have liberal political opinions. For instance, she stated that she believes "gay dudes should be allowed to adopt kids and we should all have hybrid cars". She is frequently portrayed as supporting Barack Obama. However, she said that there was an "eighty percent chance" that she would end up secretly voting for John McCain in the 2008 election, possibly a reference to Fey's friendship with former SNL host McCain, as well as her impersonation of Sarah Palin.

She is shown to be somewhat burdened with "white guilt," which Tracy uses to manipulate her in the episode "Jack-Tor". She later says that her affliction "is to be used only for good, like over-tipping and supporting Barack Obama". She is often very concerned about not being seen as racist; for example, an African American man (played by Wayne Brady) she was dating played the "race card" when she no longer wished to see him after realizing that they were not a good match.

When questioned what religion she was, she replied that "I pretty much do whatever Oprah tells me to". She mentions that she previously tried to get her (former) boyfriend Floyd to try out a Unitarian church with her, but he was not interested. In "The Break-Up", Liz compiles a "Pros vs. Cons" list for Dennis, in which his Catholic religion is listed as a negative. When Jack begins referring to her and TGS’s humor as "elitist, East Coast, alternative, intellectual, left wing-..." Liz cuts him off, telling him, "Just say 'Jewish'; this is taking forever."

== Relationships ==
=== Jack Donaghy ===
When Liz and Jack first meet, and for several seasons thereafter, neither realized that they had spoken to each other by telephone twenty years before.

In the beginning of the series, Liz and Jack had an antagonistic relationship. As the series progressed, however, this original dislike disappeared, and they are now close friends, with Jack at one point going so far as to tell her, "Lemon, I honestly don't know what I'd do without you". In spite of this, they still occasionally tease each other.

In Season 2, Liz declared that she and Jack "are friends", and seems to be welcome in Jack's office at any time. The two joke often about their various personal and work-related problems, and increasingly offer each other advice. Jack has even surpassed Pete as Liz's most trusted confidant. This relationship culminated when Jack, after being told he was to be the next chairman of General Electric, named Liz as his vice president and successor. In essence, Liz and Jack have developed into each other's best sounding boards. For example, when Liz believed herself to be pregnant, her first reaction was to go to Jack's office (then occupied by the daughter of G.E.'s CEO) and, when ultimately, she was unable to speak with him face to face, she left multiple messages on his phone. When Jack heavily embarrassed himself at a business retreat, Liz took the attention away from him by doing improvisation, including holding open her blouse to reveal her white bra. Jack was clearly moved and appreciative of her actions. She has done similar things multiple times, sacrificing her dignity for Jack's overall public appearance, as evidenced when she kissed Jack's business rival Devon Banks on security camera footage so she could extort him. Jack responded to this by saying "Well played". Another example is in the episode "I Do Do", when she stalled for him in front of a church, expanding her small reading to involve a guitar song and random readings from the Bible. Liz has a pregnancy scare in "Cooter" and leaves a series of messages on Jack's voicemail as she goes through a series of emotions. The pregnancy test turns out to be a false reading, and Jack flies from Washington, D.C. to New York, showing up at her door to comfort her. When Liz struggled with intimacy issues, Jack talked her through them and helped her get to the root of the problem. When she wanted to give up on herself and break up with Carol Burnett, Jack didn't allow her to, telling her "You deserve a guy like Carol and he deserves you because, I'll only say this once a decade: you're great".

Despite their close friendship, Jack rarely addresses her as "Liz", generally preferring to call her by her surname. In the Season 5 episode "Mrs. Donaghy", the minister at Jack and Avery Jessup's wedding accidentally married Jack to Liz. Although they remain platonic, Liz and Jack are required to go to marriage counseling and realize the impact they have had on each other's lives in the past 5 years. In honor of his friendship with Liz and everything she has done for him, Jack gave his first-born daughter the name "Elizabeth", albeit using the nickname "Liddy" vice "Liz" in order to honor Liddy Dole, G. Gordon Liddy and Jack's martial arts instructor Lih De.

Tina Fey has said that Liz's relationship with Jack is "somewhere between Mary Tyler Moore and Lou Grant, and Han Solo and Princess Leia." Fey previously stated that there would not be a romantic relationship between the two, as it would be "too icky." More recently, however, she admitted there is sexual tension between Jack and Liz. Jack passes Liz off as his girlfriend to make ex-wife Bianca jealous and Bianca tells Liz in one scene that "I can tell from the way he [Jack] looks at you that he's serious". Colleen Donaghy, Jack's mother, thinks that Liz is a perfect match for Jack. In "Do-Over", Jack and Liz attempt to win over temporary head of GE, Kathy Geiss by pretending to have a soap opera-style real life relationship, escalating to the point where Geiss wants the two to kiss each other (her shouting "KISS!" marks the only time Kathy Geiss has spoken in the entire series); there is a pause, but Jack and Liz refuse.

=== Jenna Maroney ===
Liz and Jenna have known each other since 1993, when they met at an audition for a car dealership commercial in Chicago, although there are many other versions of how they met (At a bachelor party, at a play Jenna was in). Liz stated in the pilot that she and Jenna worked for years to get The Girlie Show, having formerly been roommates in a Chicago neighborhood called "Little Armenia" around 1996. Given Jenna's insecure nature, Liz is generally forced to act as her rock. This has caused Liz some annoyance, especially after Jack increased Jenna's stress level and paranoia by hiring Tracy Jordan and changing the show's name from The Girlie Show to TGS With Tracy Jordan.

Liz has been seen complaining about Jenna's erratic tendencies behind her back, usually with Pete. Jenna once got mad at Liz when she overheard Liz describe her to Tracy as being "paranoid" and "neurotic." Jenna once slept with Liz's brother Mitch and said he was disgusting in bed. Liz explains this by saying that Mitch has not been right since he was in some kind of skiing accident, because of which he thinks it's still 1985 and he's still a teenager. Nonetheless, Jenna attempts to seduce Mitch once more in the episode "Ludachristmas."

Although Liz is happy to be TGS's head writer, she envies Jenna achieving the performing career they both hoped for when working at Second City. Liz confesses to Jenna, "there's still this sad little part of me that wants to be the center of attention ... that wants to be you, I guess". Liz gets the chance to be on camera as host of Dealbreakers, but the pilot is a failure. Despite their frustrations and occasional rivalries, however, the show often reveals that the two women appreciate their friendship and do their best to be supportive of the other's careers. When the phrase "That's a deal breaker, ladies" is coined by Jenna thanks to Liz's writing, Jenna surrenders the spotlight with a surprisingly short sulking period. She later encourages Liz to write a book and take on a talk show gig based on the catch phrase (though the talk show is short-lived).

=== Pete Hornberger ===
Liz and Pete have known each other since about 1996 and he's possibly the closest thing Liz has to a confidant besides Jack, especially since Jenna, her closest female friend, is far too anxious about her own life to function as such. Pete lived in Liz's apartment for an extended period while separated from his wife. He helps run TGS and serves as the only other responsible adult on the TGS staff.

=== Tracy Jordan ===
Liz has not really tried to pursue a relationship of any kind with Tracy, preferring to focus her energies on keeping his craziness in check. She is typically friendly towards him, though mainly to further this end. While Liz will refer to him as either "Tracy" or "Tray", Tracy will most often refer to Liz by her full name "Liz Lemon", "LL", or, less often, just "Lemon".

He often challenges her authority, but always ends up losing out when he does. In "The Natural Order", he cracks under the stress of doing the hard production work that Liz does every week, and in "Into the Crevasse", when Liz allowed him to make a pornographic film about her life as penance for her "Dealbreakers" book messing up Tracy's relationship with his wife, Angie, he was so disgusted that he stopped watching it halfway through. In the series finale she tearfully admits that she will miss him when TGS is over.

== Love life ==
Many episodes of the show have dealt with Lemon's ongoing search for love. According to Pete, Liz has had some "really terrible boyfriends" in the ten years that he's known her. It is repeatedly implied (and eventually confirmed) that she once dated Conan O'Brien, first when she identifies the "tall, gangly red-haired guy who played guitar all the time" whom she dated as Conan in "Blind Date"; there seems to be romantic tension between them during a brief encounter. It has become apparent that Lemon has very high standards in men, personified in her imaginary perfect husband, "Astronaut Mike Dexter". She appears to take a somewhat more realistic view of her dream man after learning about her mother's premarital relationship with then-future astronaut Edwin "Buzz" ("Eddie" to her) Aldrin and subsequently conversing with Aldrin. She shares "sexual history" with Grizz who alone addresses her as "Beth", and they are seen passionately kissing in the footage from Kenneth's party in "Greenzo". In season 4, Liz uncharacteristically instigates a one-night stand with James Franco and his Japanese body pillow, Kimiko. At one point in season 5, in the episode "It's Never Too Late For Now", Liz decides to give up on love and embrace spinsterhood by adopting a cat she calls Emily Dickinson, attending book clubs and wearing a fanny pack and baggy sweaters.

Liz has also had several multi-episode onscreen romances. A recurring gag is Liz having relationships with men who share the names of celebrities or fictional characters, including Wesley Snipes (a Caucasian Englishman), commercial airline pilot Captain Carol Burnett (though his surname is pronounced "Burn-it"), Floyd DeBarber (i.e., Floyd the Barber), Dr. Drew Baird (i.e., Dr. Drew), and Criss Chros. She also "takes her reward" for a time with new subordinate Jack "Danny" Baker (assuming Jack is in this case a diminutive of John or Jon, he shares his name with CHiPs character Jon Baker, portrayed by Liz's childhood crush, Larry Wilcox); he was even dressed as Wilcox during one of their assignations. Other boyfriends include Dennis Duffy.

In her longest onscreen relationship, Liz dates Criss Chros (James Marsden), a down-to-earth hot dog vendor named after a 1990s teen rap duo. Their relationship began sometime before season 6 and continued past the 6th-season finale, in which she and Criss finally decide to try to have a baby together. In the 7th and final season, after weeks of unsuccessful attempts at conception, believing it will increase their adoption chances, they get married at city hall. In A Goon's Deed in a Weary World, Liz and Criss adopt two children, Terry and Janett (who bear an uncanny resemblance to Tracey and Jenna), and, after disastrously attempting to become a stay-at-home mom, Criss decides to become the at home parent, allowing Liz to continue work in television. (Hogcock/Last Lunch)

== Reception ==
Lemon has been featured in several honorific lists compiled by various publications. She appeared in Comcast's list of TV's Most Intriguing Characters. AOL named her the 14th Most Memorable Female TV Character. Paste also included her in their list of the 20 Best Characters of 2011, ranking her No. 5. Lemon was also ranked No. 15 in AfterEllen.com's Top 50 Favorite Female TV Characters. In 2015, Yahoo named Lemon the greatest television character since Tony Soprano of The Sopranos, and Entertainment Weekly named Lemon one of the 25 Best TV Characters in the Past 25 Years.

Slate, discussing how the show covers politics and feminism, assessed Lemon's character as being drawn from other genres of comedy in unexpected ways: "the man-child is a venerable comic tradition, from The Jerk to Billy Madison to everything Will Ferrell does, and 30 Rock proves that an eternal 13-year-old tomboy—scared of sex, obsessed with Star Wars and meatball subs—can be just as funny as her male counterpart."

== Behind the scenes ==
Like Fey, who was head writer of Saturday Night Live (SNL) from 1999 to 2006, the character is head writer for a sketch comedy show. For this reason, Liz Lemon is widely seen by critics as a fictionalized version of Fey herself, which Fey herself has confirmed as being her intention. In a video interview conducted with Fey before the airing of the pilot, she stated that Liz is herself "five or six years ago when I first started at my job and had to figure out how to deal with big, strong personalities and get through the day, being sort-of scared of everyone... but acting like you're not scared of anyone."

Fey has reported incorporating some of her own quirks and history into the character, saying that she tries to "share as many of Liz's habits as possible so it feels truthful". Liz has been seen singing "Maybe" and Fey has noted that she also enjoys singing songs from Annie. Both were once rejected by a man who later went to "clown college" which had a huge emotional impact on them.

The character also shares her given name with Fey, whose full name is Elizabeth Stamatina Fey. However, Liz Lemon is only very rarely referred to as "Elizabeth" and the character's name is usually given as "Liz Lemon" in official contexts (example, the plaque on the door to her office). It is also worth noting that in Fey's original script for 30 Rock, Lemon's first name was "Lisa". The character's middle name, "Miervaldis," is a Latvian masculine name. Fey has said that, while Lemon's ethnic background is unknown, "Latvian seems to make sense.". She has also, more recently, been suggested to have German ancestry, and speaks at least a little of the language. The character's last name, "Lemon," is apparently intended to imply an acerbic personality and possibly also to make her full name alliterative. Fey has stated that she wanted Liz to have a good last name since she knew the character would often be called by it.

Among the child actors who portrayed Liz in flashbacks to her youth was Fey's own daughter, Alice Richmond, in "Mazel Tov, Dummies!".
