= Let's Stay Together (30 Rock) =

- 30 Rock episode
- Episode no.: Season 5 Episode 3
- Directed by: John Riggi
- Written by: Jack Burditt
- Production code: 503
- Original air date: October 7, 2010

Guest appearances
- John Amos as himself; Todd Buonopane as Jeffrey Weinerslav; Reg E. Cathey as Rutherford Rice; Queen Latifah as Regina Bookman; Rob Reiner as Rep. Rob Reiner / Stanley the Dog

Episode chronology
← Previous "When It Rains, It Pours"	Next → "Live Show"
- 30 Rock season 5

"Let's Stay Together" is the third episode of the fifth season of the American television comedy series 30 Rock, and the 83rd overall episode of the series. It was directed by co-executive producer John Riggi and written by co-executive producer Jack Burditt. The episode originally aired on NBC in the United States on October 7, 2010. Guest stars in this episode include John Amos, Todd Buonopane, Reg E. Cathey, Queen Latifah and Rob Reiner.

In the episode, Jack Donaghy (Alec Baldwin) must appear before Congress to discuss NBC's merger with the fictional company network KableTown (a parody of Comcast). He hopes that he will charm celebrity members for the deal to go through, but one Congresswoman (Latifah) demands more diversity in the NBC programming lineup. As a result, Jack enlists Tracy Jordan (Tracy Morgan) to come up with some new development ideas. Meanwhile, Liz Lemon (Tina Fey), the head writer of the fictional sketch show The Girlie Show with Tracy Jordan (TGS) is fed up with the criticism her writing staff gives her, and finally Jenna Maroney (Jane Krakowski) helps Kenneth Parcell (Jack McBrayer) reapply in the competitive NBC page program.

This episode of 30 Rock was generally, though not universally, well received among television critics. According to the Nielsen Media Research, it was watched by 4.90 million households during its original broadcast, and received a 2.1 rating/7 share among viewers in the 18–49 demographic.

== Plot ==
NBC executive Jack Donaghy (Alec Baldwin) attends a Congressional hearing in Washington D.C. regarding the Kabletown-NBC merger deal. He is able to consolidate support for the deal, until Representative Regina Bookman (Queen Latifah) calls out NBC for being racist and demands that there be more diversity in the programming lineup. Following the hearing, Jack goes back to New York and asks Tracy Jordan (Tracy Morgan) and "Dot Com" Slattery (Kevin Brown) to produce a program for the African-American community. Dot Com suggests a show called Let's Stay Together, about an African-American family in the 1970s, but when Grizz Griswold (Grizz Chapman) suggests that a talking dog be added to the show, Tracy orders Dot Com to incorporate it into the rewrite, much to Dot Com's dismay.

Meanwhile, Liz Lemon (Tina Fey), the head writer of the sketch show TGS with Tracy Jordan, is unhappy about the lack of respect she gets from her writing staff and complains to Jack, her boss, about the situation. Jack asks her if staff writer James "Toofer" Spurlock (Keith Powell) can be promoted to co-head writer in an effort to diversify NBC. Liz accepts, seeing this as an opportunity for someone else to get the lack of respect and complaints she does. She gets upset, though, when Toofer gets a television interview as head writer, and insists that she herself should also be there as she is co-head writer. The two appear on Rutherford Rice's (Reg E. Cathey) talk show Right On, a show aimed toward African-American audiences. Liz gets visibly upset when Rice gives Toofer all of the credit she deserves, and as a result of her behavior she is escorted off the set by a security guard.

At the same time, Kenneth Parcell (Jack McBrayer), a former NBC page, is back at NBC and wants to reapply to the page program, but notes that it has become a pageant. When Jenna Maroney (Jane Krakowski) hears of this, she volunteers to help him win the pageant using her own pageant experience. Jenna treats Kenneth as her mother Verna (Jan Hooks) treated her during her pageant years. After a failed, over-the-top performance in front of Human resources mediator Jeffrey Weinerslav (Todd Buonopane), Jenna vows to get Kenneth his job back. She goes to Jack to ask him for his help, and Jack orders Jeffrey to hire Kenneth back.

When Representative Bookman makes an unexpected visit to New York, Jack tries to show NBC's commitment to diversity, but is thwarted when Bookman sees signs next to two bathrooms that read "Colored" and "White" that were really intended for the paper recycling bins that had been removed only moments ago, and Jeffrey informing Jack and Bookman that the minority slot in the page program was filled by Kenneth. Jack tries to improve the situation by giving "head writer" Toofer a medal for his work, but Bookman sees right through this, and discovers that Liz is the only one that truly deserves her respect and congratulates her. After more grandstanding, Bookman tells Jack she will vote no on the Kabletown-NBC deal unless he gives her reason not to.

The episode ends with a taping of the Let's Stay Together rewrite, including the talking dog.

== Production ==
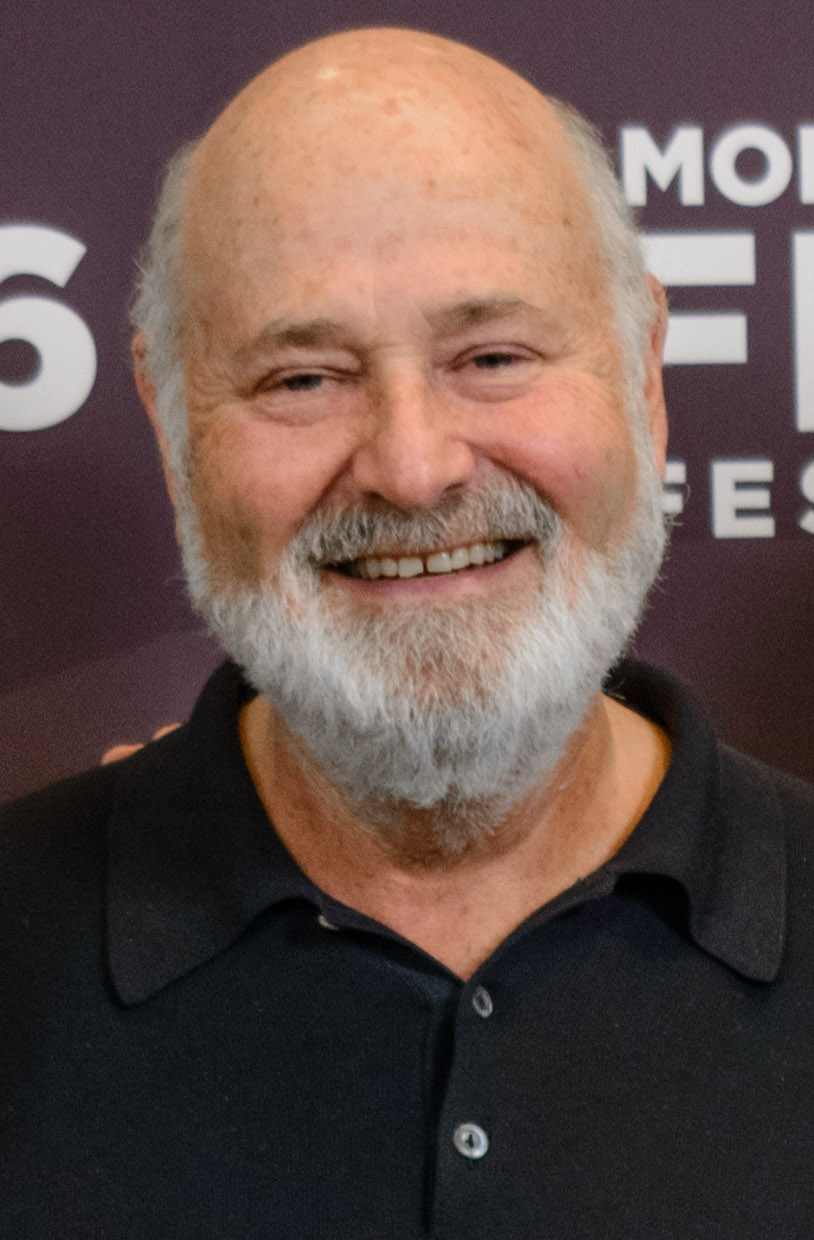
Rob Reiner guest starred as himself in "Let's Stay Together"

"Let's Stay Together" was written by co-executive producer Jack Burditt and directed by co-executive producer and staff writer John Riggi. This was Burditt's thirteenth writing credit after "Jack Meets Dennis", "The Baby Show", "The Fighting Irish", "Cleveland", "Rosemary's Baby", "Subway Hero", "Sandwich Day", "The One with the Cast of Night Court", "St. Valentine's Day", "The Ones", "Kidney Now!", and "Don Geiss, America and Hope". This was Riggi's fourth helmed episode, having directed "Goodbye, My Friend", "The Problem Solvers" and "The Moms". This episode of 30 Rock originally aired on NBC in the United States on October 7, 2010, as the third episode of the show's fifth season and the 83rd overall episode of the series.

In September 2010, it was announced that actress and singer Queen Latifah would guest star on the show as a Congresswoman named Regina Bookman who demands from Alec Baldwin's character, Jack Donaghy, more diversity in its NBC programming lineup. Latifah is a fan of the show and big fan of Baldwin and series creator, executive producer and lead actress Tina Fey. She said in an interview she was "out of my mind" excited to guest-star. Latifah is due to appear in a future episode of 30 Rock. It was also confirmed that actor-director Rob Reiner would appear as himself, and in "Let's Stay Together" he played a Congressman. Michael Ausiello of Entertainment Weekly reported in August 2010 that the show set a casting call "for an African-American male in the 30s-60s age range" to play a fictitious host named Rutherford Rice, a host of Right On, a fictitious talk show focusing on African American issues. In this episode, Rutherford Rice was played by actor Reg E. Cathey, best known for his role on the HBO drama The Wire as Norman Wilson. Actor John Amos made a brief appearance in the episode in which he stars in one scene from the Let's Stay Together show alongside a talking dog named Stanley the Dog. This was actor Todd Buonopane's fourth appearance as the character Jeffrey Weinerslav, an NBC Human resource mediator. Buonopane previously appeared in the season three episodes "Believe in the Stars", "Cutbacks", and "Jackie Jormp-Jomp".

In an August 2010 interview, co-showrunner and executive producer Robert Carlock was asked if the series would continue to make reference of the real-life acquisition of NBC Universal by cable company Comcast—which occurred in November 2009—to which Carlock replied that their version of the acquisition was in the "works". Carlock noted that the NBC-Comcast deal would not change the show's "reason for existence", explaining that since the merger has occurred it has made things "even funnier" for the staff writers. "To us it's great, we've been able to do our version of 'ripped from the headlines,' which a lot of comedies don't get to do." In the episode, Representative Bookman called out NBC for being racist in regards to its programming lacking diversity. This subplot was based on real-life in which Jeff Zucker, then-President and CEO of NBC Universal, who attended the House Judiciary Committee hearing in February 2010 to discuss the NBC-Comcast deal, was asked by United States Representative Maxine Waters why the NBC network had not attempted to create shows that would appeal to the black community.

== Cultural references ==
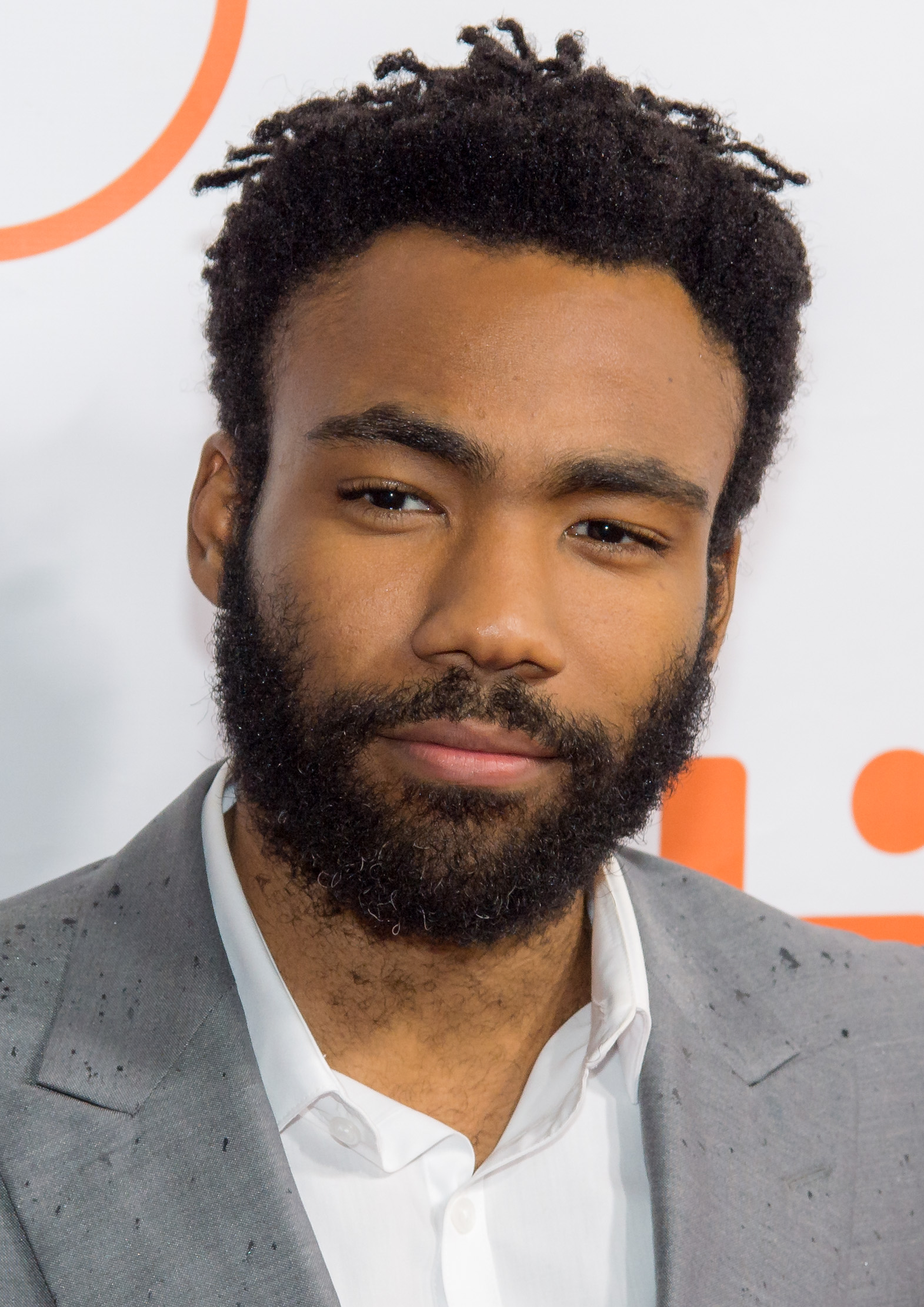
Donald Glover (pictured), a former 30 Rock writer, is referenced in the episode

In the beginning of the episode, Liz tells Jack that her writing staff have been replacing her name-plate title with various names including "F. Krueger." She explains that the name refers to a time in which she got a chemical peel, as well as wore a red and green sweater and a fedora. This is a reference to the fictional horror villain from the A Nightmare on Elm Street series Freddy Krueger's appearance. During the hearing in Washington D.C., Representative Rob Reiner says "The acclaimed director of When Harry Met Sally... would never do that!", a reference to Reiner who directed the 1989 romantic comedy When Harry Met Sally....

One of the applicants to become an NBC page plays a keyboard and sings in the tune of musician Billy Joel's 1989 song "We Didn't Start the Fire". After returning from the hearing in Washington, in which Representative Bookman accused NBC of being racist, Jack tells Liz that during the hearing he did not pay attention to Bookman's heartfelt speech as he was too busy trying to remember the name "of the black kid on Community", a reference to actor Donald Glover who stars in Community—another NBC program—and who Jack is referring to. In addition, Glover was a former writer on 30 Rock, and made several cameo appearances on the show. Coincidentally, guest star Queen Latifah executive produces the romantic comedy television series Let's Stay Together that airs on BET.

30 Rock and Studio 60 on the Sunset Strip—both of which debuted on 2006–07 NBC lineup—revolved around the off-camera happenings on a sketch comedy series. The first season episode "Jack the Writer" contained a self-referencing walk and talk sequence, which was commonly used on Studio 60 on the Sunset Strip and Sorkin's previous series The West Wing. In this episode, the walk and talk sequence is seen here in which Jack, before departing to Washington, has a discussion with Liz.

Let's Stay Together was a show conceived by Dot Com with a setting and characters similar to influential African American sitcom Good Times. John Amos, who played the father on Good Times, makes a cameo appearance as the lead in the scene being filmed for the new show. He has cheesy lines and co-stars with a talking dog, a corruption of the show's original concept reminiscent of comments Amos and others have made regarding wasted potential in Good Times.

== Reception ==
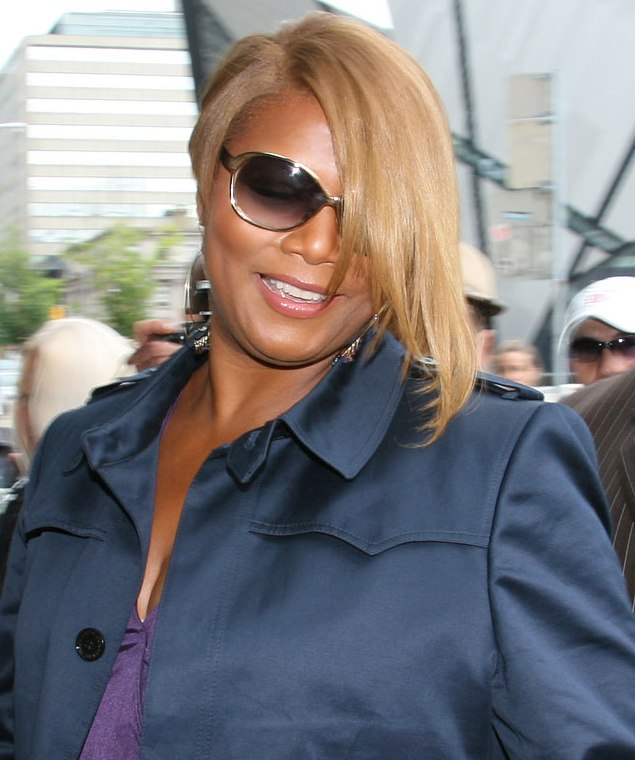
Queen Latifah's appearance was well received by critics

In its original American broadcast, "Let's Stay Together" was watched by 4.90 million households, according to the Nielsen Media Research. It received a 2.1 rating/7 share among viewers in the 18–49 demographic, that is 2.1 percent of all people in that group, and 7 percent of all people from that group watching television at the time, watched the episode. This was a decrease from the previous episode, "When It Rains, It Pours", which was watched by 5.688 million American viewers.

Andy Greenwald of New York magazine called "Let's Stay Together" a "pretty great episode for a show that ... seems to have gotten its groove back." Television columnist Alan Sepiwall for HitFix who enjoyed the previous week's episode as he believed the show was back in peak, noted that the show "was back to more uneven, but still funny, territory" with this episode. Sepinwall felt that parts of the episode "worked just fine", and enjoyed Liz's disastrous appearance on Right On. He, however, did not like Jenna and Kenneth's pageant story. A contributor from The Huffington Post said the episode had a "ton of hilarious moments", and that Queen Latifah "was the highlight of the show". Vanity Fair's Juli Weiner enjoyed Maulik Pancholy's appearance as Jack's assistant Jonathan, writing that Jonathan is "perhaps the most underutilized character on the show, and we were happy to see him get some screen time this episode." Further in her recap, Weiner said "Thank you, Jenna and Jack, for mercifully putting an end to the tension-less Kenneth's-rehiring narrative." Meredith Blake from the Los Angeles Times deemed it a "wildly clever and satiric episode" that also "delivered an important critique about the limitations of diversity programs." Blake said that Jane Krakowski's Jenna was on fire in "Let's Stay Together". Scott Eidler of The Cornell Daily Sun commented that the show has always dealt with racism issues "pretty well" and that the issue featured here "was no exception." Bob Sassone of AOL's TV Squad reported that "Let's Stay Together" was one of his favorite episodes of the season, and that it was a "massively pleasing episode." Caitlan Smith of The Atlantic wrote that Latifah "stole the show" and "drove the action" as her character Regina Bookman in this episode of 30 Rock.

The A.V. Club's Nathan Rabin called this episode "clumsy and tired", explaining it was "misfiring on all cylinders. The satire was toothless, the playing strained and the whole enterprise reeked of mild desperation." He continued in his recap that "Let's Stay Together" had a "golden opportunity to comment insightfully and hilariously about the tricky intersection of politics, power, race and privilege", however "it recycled jokes that were unfunny and overly familiar the first time around". In conclusion, Rabin gave it a C grade rating. Brad Sanders of the Indiana Daily Student opined that the show's writing "is still sharp – not 'as sharp as ever,' but sharp – but a lot of the most interesting plots have already played out, and a lot of the new plots aren't interesting." Sanders said that the stories featured here had "a few big laughs ... but they're assembled so haphazardly and put into such a bulky framework that the train just never gets enough steam to salvage the episode."
