= Everything Sunny All the Time Always =

- 30 Rock episode
- Episode no.: Season 5 Episode 22
- Directed by: John Riggi
- Written by: Kay Cannon; Matt Hubbard
- Production code: 522
- Original air date: April 28, 2011

Guest appearances
- Condoleezza Rice as herself; Margaret Cho as Kim Jong-il; Elizabeth Banks as Avery Jessup; Adriane Lenox as Sherry; Thomas Roberts as himself

Episode chronology
| ← Previous "100" | Next → "Respawn" |
- 30 Rock season 5

"Everything Sunny All the Time Always" is the twenty-second episode of the fifth season of the American television comedy series 30 Rock, and the 102nd overall episode of the series. It was written by producer Kay Cannon and co-executive producer Matt Hubbard and directed by John Riggi. The episode originally aired on NBC in the United States on April 28, 2011. Guest stars include Condoleezza Rice, Margaret Cho, Elizabeth Banks, Adriane Lenox, and Thomas Roberts.

In the episode, Jack Donaghy (Alec Baldwin) is shocked to discover that his wife, Avery Jessup (Elizabeth Banks), has been detained in North Korea by Kim Jong-il (Margaret Cho) to be used in propaganda. Meanwhile, Liz Lemon (Tina Fey) rearranges her personal life and comes upon an obstacle. Furthermore, Tracy Jordan (Tracy Morgan) settles back into TGS With Tracy Jordan, only to discover that his entourage members, Grizz (Grizz Chapman) and Dot Com (Kevin Brown), have bonded with Kenneth Parcell (Jack McBrayer) in his absence.

KUAM aired the episode on Sunday, May 1, 2011 due to The Royal Wedding, which aired the next morning on most NBC Stations, preempting the episode.

== Plot ==
Liz Lemon (Tina Fey) is clearing out her apartment following her discovery that Tracy Jordan (Tracy Morgan) had been living there. She comes to the conclusion that she needs to take control of her personal life. However, her hopes are dashed when a plastic bag (David Laundra) blows into a tree opposite her apartment and becomes stuck there. Liz is determined to get the plastic bag removed from the tree. She is told by her building's doorman that she will have to take it up with the city. Following a disastrous visit to City Hall, Liz attempts to take matters into her own hands and attacks the tree. As a result, she is apprehended by a police officer with a taser.

Meanwhile, Jack Donaghy (Alec Baldwin) is shocked to learn that his wife Avery Jessup has been kidnapped by Kim Jong-il while in North Korea. Avery is forced to take part in Anti-American propaganda. Jack turns to his ex-girlfriend, former Secretary of State Condoleezza Rice, with whom he broke up via text message, for help. However, she is unable to assist and Avery is forced into marrying Kim Jong-un.

Tracy returns to work at TGS but is shocked to discover his entourage members, Grizz (Grizz Chapman) and Dot Com (Kevin Brown), as well as Kenneth Parcell (Jack McBrayer) referring to an amusing incident that happened during his absence. Tracy forces the trio to recreate the events that led to the incident. Eventually, they admit that they missed Tracy.

== Cultural references ==
Invictus is a poem by William Ernest Henley. Liz recognizes the poem from the 2009 film Invictus and wonders aloud, "Who was the white guy in that?" She is thinking of Matt Damon, who had formerly portrayed her boyfriend Carol on 30 Rock. Kim Jong-il mentions that Laura Ling left North Korea because "she can't party as hard as we can".

At the end of the episode, there is another clip (possibly from the same movie as the first clip) starring Tracy Jordan and Kim Jong-il. The scene starts out with the "Coffee's for closers" bit from Glengarry Glen Ross (a movie in which Alec Baldwin, who plays Jack Donaghy, played the part of Blake) before Kim Jong-il says, "Luke, I am your father" (which is a misquoted line from The Empire Strikes Back), then says "Ghostbusters!" (in reference to the film).

== Reception ==
According to the Nielsen Media Research, this episode of 30 Rock was watched by 3.95 million households in its original American broadcast. It earned a 1.9 rating/5 share in the 18–49 demographic. This means that it was seen by 1.9 percent of all 18- to 49-year-olds, and 5 percent of all 18- to 49-year-olds watching television at the time of the broadcast.
