= College (30 Rock) =

- 30 Rock episode
- Episode no.: Season 5 Episode 8
- Directed by: Don Scardino
- Written by: Josh Siegal; Dylan Morgan
- Production code: 508
- Original air date: November 18, 2010

Guest appearance
- Daniel Sunjata as Chris

Episode chronology
← Previous "Brooklyn Without Limits"	Next → "Chain Reaction of Mental Anguish"
- 30 Rock season 5

"College" is the eighth episode of the fifth season of the American television comedy series 30 Rock, and the 88th overall episode of the series. It was directed by producer Don Scardino, and written by Josh Siegal and Dylan Morgan. The episode originally aired on NBC in the United States on November 18, 2010. The episode's only guest star is Daniel Sunjata.

In the episode, Liz Lemon (Tina Fey) wins the crew lottery and is booed by her coworkers but decides to treat them using the money at a bar and, from there, continues to impress her coworkers. Meanwhile, the TGS writers discover that Jack Donaghy's (Alec Baldwin) voice is used on an online dictionary. They use this discovery to trick Pete Hornberger (Scott Adsit) into thinking that Jack invited him to spend time with him. Meanwhile, Jack decides to visit the microwave division that he is boss of and makes a startling discovery.

== Plot ==
When Liz Lemon (Tina Fey) wins the TGS with Tracy Jordan crew lottery of $1000, she faces harsh criticism from her lesser paid co-workers and attempts to remedy the situation by buying everybody drinks at a bar. Her generosity brings her respect amongst the crew and reminds her of a time in her freshman year at college when she had been momentarily popular amongst her peers. As Liz's attempts to remain in favour grow increasingly out of hand, Jenna Maroney (Jane Krakowski) and Tracy Jordan (Tracy Morgan) warn her against her crusade, arguing that she was never meant to be one of the popular ones.

Meanwhile, Jack Donaghy (Alec Baldwin) pays a visit to the General Electric microwave division that he manages and makes the surprising discovery that they have achieved their highest sales quarter yet without any input from him. Dismayed at his apparent lack of influence on the brand's success, he ropes Kenneth Parcell (Jack McBrayer) into trying to find a flaw in the company's apparently perfect new microwave. Jack finally realizes that his influence on the company is declining when he is told by the malfunctioning microwave that it is time for him to leave. Finally, the TGS writers discover that Jack had been the voice of a perfect American English program called pronouncify.com when he was in college and decide to trick Pete Hornberger (Scott Adsit) into believing that Jack wants to be his friend.

Ultimately, Liz becomes unpopular with the crew again and comes to accept that this is how things are meant to be. Similarly, Jack accepts that he doesn't need to have a hands on involvement with the microwave brand. The TGS writers' plan backfires badly when Jack not only returns Pete's overtures of friendship, but exacts revenge on his co-workers for attempting to embarrass him.

== Cultural references ==
In the start of the episode, Liz says that playing card she gambled on has a 1-in-52 chance of being picked from the deck, Tracy tells her she's "like Rain Man" and asks how many toothpicks are on the ground. This refers to a scene in Barry Levinson's 1988 film Rain Man. In a diner, a waitress spills a box of toothpicks, to which Raymond immediately says there are 246 on the ground. His brother tells him he's close after the waitress said the box is of 250, but she then reveals there are 4 left in the box.

In a conversation with Liz, Jack discusses his scholarship at Princeton, which included recording words for the Linguistics Department. He laments that his voice has been dragged into various things like Thomas the Tank Engine and Wu-Tang Clan songs. This joke refers to Alec Baldwin's role as a storyteller for Thomas and Friends in the U.S., seasons 5 and 6. He was also cast in the role of Mr. Conductor in Thomas and the Magic Railroad in 2000.

Later, when Jack visits the microwave division of GE, the new microwave being developed is called TK-421, the same designation of a storm trooper on the Death Star in Star Wars. Jack states that all GE products must be "Six Sigmas" to perfection. This refers to a business management strategy to improve quality of production outputs; the "Six Sigma" concept was previously parodied in the season 3 episode "Retreat to Move Forward".

This episode features the song "Aqualung" by Jethro Tull. In the post-credits scene, the episode plays graduation music and mimics the well-known college movie National Lampoon's Animal House with lines over the credits that indicate what the characters did in the future. During this sequence, Jack is said to have "spent the night on a couch that costs more than your car", a reference to Baldwin's cameo appearance in Glengarry Glen Ross.

== Reception ==
According to the Nielsen Media Research, this episode of 30 Rock was watched by 5.11 million households in its original American broadcast. It earned a 2.2 rating/6 share in the 18–49 demographic. This means that it was seen by 2.2 percent of all 18- to 49-year-olds, and 6 percent of all 18- to 49-year-olds watching television at the time of the broadcast.

In writing for Hitfix, Alan Sepinwall gave it a mixed review, stating that it "felt like one of those episodes we often got in the third season, where a lot of funny things happened but things didn't quite work as a whole". He commented that the main plot line on Liz's popularity in college felt overused, like "a well the show had gone to a little too often". Nonetheless, he enjoyed the plot lines and found the episode funny.

Ian McDonald, writing for TV Over Mind, was very positive, commenting "tonight's 30 Rock hit the proverbial ball out of the proverbial park" and complimented the character development for Jack, praising the writers for having "created and molded one of the most interesting characters ever on a network comedy. From working his way through college being voted "Most" at Harvard to his very complicated youth being raised by an insane woman, there is always something new to learn about John Francis Donaghy."

Dan Forcella of TV Fanatic called the episode "a winner" and praised the "stellar performances by Alec Baldwin, Tina Fey and everyone in the writers' room". However, Louisa Mellor of Den of Geek was more mixed in her review, accusing the episode of rehashing the plot of earlier episode "The C Word" and calling it "clunkily themed" and the storyline "mostly humour-free".
