= Plan B (30 Rock) =

- 30 Rock episode
- Episode no.: Season 5 Episode 18
- Directed by: Jeff Richmond
- Written by: Josh Siegal; Dylan Morgan
- Production code: 518
- Original air date: March 24, 2011

Guest appearances
- Ken Howard as Hank Hooper; Aaron Sorkin as himself; Will Arnett as Devon Banks; Josh Fadem as Simon Behrens; Hannibal Buress as a homeless man

Episode chronology
← Previous "Queen of Jordan"	Next → "I Heart Connecticut"
- 30 Rock season 5

"Plan B" is the eighteenth episode of the fifth season of the American television comedy series 30 Rock, and the 98th overall episode of the series. It was directed by the show's composer and producer (and Tina Fey's husband) Jeff Richmond, and written by Josh Siegal and Dylan Morgan. The episode originally aired on NBC in the United States on March 24, 2011. Guest stars include Ken Howard, Aaron Sorkin and Will Arnett.

In the episode, Liz Lemon (Tina Fey) discovers that without Tracy Jordan (Tracy Morgan), NBC is putting TGS on a forced hiatus. However, when she passes on the news to the cast and crew, they all assume that the show will be cancelled and turn to their backup plans, leading Liz to wonder about her own. Meanwhile, Jack Donaghy (Alec Baldwin) is forced to hire his nemesis Devon Banks in order to turn around his disastrous acquisition of TWINKS, a network for gay men.

According to Nielsen Media Research, "Plan B" was watched by 4.359 million viewers during its original broadcast and received a 1.9 rating/5 share among adults aged 18–49.

== Plot ==
Jack Donaghy (Alec Baldwin) calls Liz Lemon (Tina Fey) into his office to inform her that while its primary star Tracy Jordan (Tracy Morgan) is in Africa, The Girlie Show with Tracy Jordan (TGS) will have to be placed on a forced hiatus. Initially, Liz herself is optimistic and believes that Jack will be doing all that he can to save the show. However, when her cast and crew hear the news, they quickly scramble to find other employment. Concerned, Liz decides to contact her agent, Simon (Josh Fadem), wanting to see if he can find her other work.

Jack gets Liz an interview with Nick Lachey for a writing job in The Sing-Off, where she meets Aaron Sorkin. Sorkin, in a walk and talk sequence, advises Liz that writing is a dying art. He then starts sucking up to Lachey himself. Ultimately, Liz doesn't get the writing job and is forced to try to save TGS, which even Kenneth Parcell (Jack McBrayer) has lost all hope of rescuing.

Meanwhile, Jack Donaghy has recently acquired a television network for gay men called TWINKS, which has turned out to be a ratings disaster. Kabletown boss Hank Hooper (Ken Howard) is unhappy with TWINKS and advises Jack to either find a gay version of himself to run the network or drop the network altogether. Jack realizes that there is a gay version of himself and calls upon his old nemesis Devon Banks for help. As it turns out, Banks has fallen from grace and is living in Brooklyn with his partner and three "gaybies".

Eventually, Liz's attempts to save TGS are met with a slight possibility of succeeding when Kenneth informs her that during his webcam talks with Tracy, he sometimes orders pizza from the same restaurant as she does. Liz immediately realizes that Tracy never left New York City.

Jack's plans for reviving TWINKS backfire when Devon Banks brings one of his "gaybies" to work and Hank Hooper, a family man himself, promotes him. However, Devon has an epiphany and realizes that he loves his children too much to leave them for Kabletown, turning down Hooper's offer in the process. While victorious, Jack realizes that he hasn't been spending enough time with his own baby daughter.

== Reception ==
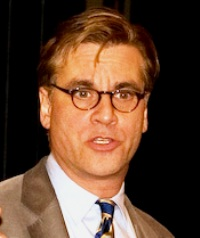
Aaron Sorkin's appearance in "Plan B" as himself was particularly appreciated by critics

According to the Nielsen Media Research, this episode of 30 Rock was watched by 4.359 million households in its original American broadcast. It earned a 1.9 rating/5 share in the 18–49 demographic. This means that it was seen by 1.9 percent of all 18- to 49-year-olds, and 5 percent of all 18- to 49-year-olds watching television at the time of the broadcast. The figure was an improvement on the previous episode, Queen of Jordan, which was seen by 4.192 million households.

Caitlan Smith of The Atlantic particularly praised the appearance of Aaron Sorkin, calling it "one of the most unexpected and excellent cameos this year". Dan Forcella of TVFanatic also praised Sorkin's appearance, as well as that of Ken Howard, whom he described as "a joy to watch on screen". However, he criticised the primary storyline, commenting that "Liz acting frantic is never really that funny".
