= Brooklyn Without Limits =

- 30 Rock episode
- Episode no.: Season 5 Episode 7
- Directed by: Michael Engler
- Written by: Ron Weiner
- Production code: 507
- Original air date: November 11, 2010

Guest appearances
- David Gregory as himself; John Slattery as Steve Austin; Sue Galloway as Sue; Nea McLin as Liz's Butt Double; Michael Cyril Creighton as BWL Salesman

Episode chronology
← Previous "Gentleman's Intermission"	Next → "College"
- 30 Rock season 5

"Brooklyn Without Limits" is the seventh episode of the fifth season of the American television comedy series 30 Rock, and the 87th overall episode of the series. It was written by co-executive producer Ron Weiner and directed by Michael Engler. The episode originally aired on NBC in the United States on November 11, 2010.

In the episode, Liz Lemon (Tina Fey) finds a pair of jeans that make her look sexy, but which leave her with an unexpected moral dilemma; Jack Donaghy (Alec Baldwin) attempts to stop Regina Bookman (Queen Latifah) from being elected by endorsing her political rival Steven Austin (special guest star John Slattery); and a jealous Jenna Maroney (Jane Krakowski) attempts to sabotage the chances of the new Tracy Jordan (Tracy Morgan) film winning a Golden Globe Award.

== Plot ==
While shopping at a store called "Brooklyn Without Limits" with Jenna Maroney (Jane Krakowski), Liz Lemon (Tina Fey) miraculously finds a pair of jeans that make her look sexy and win her new respect at work, but she is informed by Jack that the seemingly artsy and liberal store is, in fact, owned by Halliburton, and the jeans are made by a "Vietnamese slave tribe" on an "island prison" called Usa (pronounced "oosa"). Liz becomes conflicted over whether to keep the jeans and her new image, or stand up for what she believes in.

Meanwhile, Jack Donaghy (Alec Baldwin), in an attempt to keep Regina Bookman from being reelected, decides to endorse her rival, a Rhode Island independent candidate named Steven Austin (special guest star John Slattery). It soon becomes clear that Austin is mentally unstable, as he plans to return to the "Founding Father's America" which he envisions as "no paved roads, rum used as an anesthetic, [and] legal slavery." He also wants to build a casino on the moon. Despite this, Jack holds a fundraiser for him and edits a pre-recorded speech of Austin's to make him seem sane.

At the same time, Tracy Jordan (Tracy Morgan) has discovered that he is being considered for a Golden Globe, and that members of the Hollywood Foreign Press Association will be evaluating his film. Taking advantage of his inexperience, Jenna attempts to sabotage him by convincing him to hold a private screening of the film and bribe them. She does not reveal that she had attempted to do the same, only to be banned for life from the Golden Globes.

In the end, all three decide to do the right thing. At the screening of Hard to Watch, all in the audience, including Jenna, are moved to tears. At the last minute, Jenna tells Tracy to not bribe the critics, telling him that the film is good enough to win a Golden Globe on its own. Seeing this, Liz is convinced to return the jeans. She does, and returns to work in a ridiculously unflattering pair of "Shorteralls". Jack sees her and decides to let Bookman win rather than let an insane man into Congress. He convinces Austin to make a live speech, where he destroys all of the support Jack generated.

== Reception ==
According to the Nielsen Media Research, this episode of 30 Rock was watched by 5.09 million households in its original American broadcast. It earned a 2.4 rating/7 share in the 18–49 demographic. This means that it was seen by 2.4 percent of all 18- to 49-year-olds, and 7 percent of all 18- to 49-year-olds watching television at the time of the broadcast.

The episode received generally positive reviews from critics. Leonard Pierce of The A.V. Club awarded the episode a B score and complimented the fifth season of 30 Rock for demonstrating an improvement in quality over the fourth, but accused "Brooklyn Without Limits" of being "a step in the wrong direction". He mostly criticized the political overtones, commenting "this is a funny show, but it's not an especially politically astute one, and it tends to stick its foot in a bucket and clank around for half an hour when it turns to politically oriented storylines." However he concluded that "there was enough in the way of killer one-liners in this episode to keep it from sinking; this same episode, last season, would likely have been a disaster".

Alan Sepinwall of HitFix also spoke favourably about the quality of the fifth season, opining that "with a few exceptions, this young season is shaping up to be the show's best since year two". He particularly praised guest star John Slattery, commenting "everything about the Steve Austin character was just glorious in its absurdity. Often, when you introduce someone this ridiculous, the joke gets old after a scene or two, but the episode kept finding new levels of perversity to take the guy". Den of Geek writer Louisa Mellor wrote that John Slattery was the "best used guest role of the series so far".
