= Queen of Jordan (30 Rock) =

- 30 Rock episode
- Episode no.: Season 5 Episode 17
- Directed by: Ken Whittingham
- Written by: Tracey Wigfield
- Production code: 517
- Original air date: March 17, 2011

Guest appearances
- Sherri Shepherd as Angie Jordan; Susan Sarandon as Lynn Onkman; Tituss Burgess as D'Fwan; Paula Leggett Chase as Randi; Moya Angela as Portia; Ephraim Sykes as Michael

Episode chronology
← Previous "TGS Hates Women"	Next → "Plan B"
- 30 Rock season 5

"Queen of Jordan" is the seventeenth episode of the fifth season of the American television comedy series 30 Rock, and the 97th overall episode of the series. It was written by Tracey Wigfield and directed by Ken Whittingham. The episode originally aired on NBC in the United States on March 17, 2011. The episode follows a reality show format and often parallels the events of The Real Housewives franchise. Guest stars in this episode include Sherri Shepherd, Susan Sarandon and Tituss Burgess.

This episode aired as an episode of Queen of Jordan, a fictional reality series that started sometime during the events of "Mrs. Donaghy". In this episode, Jack Donaghy (Alec Baldwin) tasks Liz with convincing Angie to get Tracy to return from Africa. Meanwhile, Frank is found by his lost love. Throughout the episode, Jack gets into embarrassing situations and Jenna tries to be the focus of the reality show's cameras.

This episode of 30 Rock received generally positive reviews from television critics. According to Nielsen Media Research, "Queen of Jordan" was watched by 4.192 million households during its original broadcast, and received a 1.7 rating/5 share among viewers in the 18–49 demographic.

== Plot ==
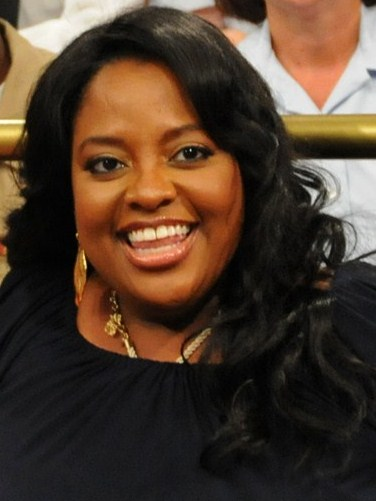
Sherri Shepherd guest starred as Angie Jordan, whose reality TV show Queen of Jordan replaced the usual 30 Rock format

Angie Jordan (guest star Sherri Shepherd) heads for a meeting with Jack Donaghy (Alec Baldwin) to discuss how her new single. Jack offers to throw a release party on the set of TGS, but during the conversation, he trips on camera. Liz Lemon (Tina Fey), head writer of TGS, begs Angie to get Tracy Jordan (Tracy Morgan) to come back from Africa, but Angie refuses. Liz is worried, but Jack tells Liz to continue trying to convince Angie to get Tracy back. Liz uses several attempts: impersonating Tracy, showing Angie their wedding video, and attempting to send an e-mail from Angie's computer to Tracy, which only further irritates Angie.

Jenna Maroney (Jane Krakowski) tries to get more screen time and promote her website Jennas-Side.com (which, when said out loud, sounds like "genocide") with the reality show cameras by throwing wine at people. Portia (Moya Angela) talks to Jenna about her alcoholism. Jenna pretends to not like the planned intervention, while actually loving it because it will get her more screen time. However, her plan backfires in the end when Pete, who led the intervention, sends Jenna to rehab in Minnesota. Jenna knocks the driver unconscious and sneaks off to Angie's release party.

Meanwhile, Jack Donaghy is being portrayed as a clumsy on the show. To deflect from these characterization, he discusses his football days at Princeton and says that he "went both ways" (i.e., played on both offense and defense in football) and was "on the DL" (i.e., the baseball disabled list), but these are misconstrued as euphemisms for his supposed homosexuality. Jack, in a talking head interview, says that he is not gay, but further embarrasses himself when a fart sound is heard as he stands up from the chair.

Lynn Onkman (Susan Sarandon), a teacher who had an affair with a student, is released from jail. At TGS office, one of the writers, Frank Rossitano (Judah Friedlander), is revealed to be Lynn's former student and lover when he was 14. This led to Lynn Onkman's arrest and status as a registered sex offender. Lynn meets Frank at the TGS office. Inspired by their love, Randi (Paula Leggett Chase) sets them up on a date at her pole-dancing studio and watches them while she dances on a pole. Frank and Lynn have an argument because she talks about how he has remained "stuck" as a boy who loves comic books and action figures. Frank storms out, but the next day, he brings all his toys to her workplace in a fast food restaurant and puts them in a deep fryer to prove that he is ready to become a man for her. Lynn is fired, but the two rekindle their relationship.

At the release party, Liz finally confronts Angie about getting Tracy back and flips a table in anger. Angie cries, but when Liz apologizes, she says that it is because of seeing how Frank and Lynn love each other. She goes on to say that she misses her "weird love" with Tracy. Angie confesses that she has been trying to get Tracy to come back since he left, but because he does not want to come back, she pretends to be happy about it.

== Reception ==
According to the Nielsen Media Research, this episode of 30 Rock was watched by 4.192 million households in its original American broadcast. It earned a 1.7 rating/5 share in the 18–49 demographic. This means that it was seen by 1.7 percent of all 18- to 49-year-olds, and 5 percent of all 18- to 49-year-olds watching television at the time of the broadcast. The figure was a decrease from the previous episode, "TGS Hates Women", which was seen by 4.501 million households.

Alan Sepinwall of HitFix was largely positive toward the episode, describing it as "a pretty thorough send-up of the cliches of the Real Housewives franchise" and opining that "Jack sinking deeper and deeper into the show's caricatured conception of him was hilarious". Sepinwall also noted that "Tracy Morgan's medical leave [had] forced the show to vamp a bit, and this was a particularly creative bit of vamping with some fine gags", however he commented that he looked forward to the show returning to normal the following week.

The A.V. Club critic Emily VanDerWerff commented on the improved quality that the fifth season of 30 Rock had demonstrated, attributing it to the show "rediscovering its sense of playfulness". She praised the primary plot, commenting that "the Liz storyline was unexpectedly moving, as Liz’s farcical attempts to get Tracy to come back [...] led to the revelation that Angie has been trying to get Tracy to come back to no avail". However, she also noted that the episode's format crowded out a number of storylines, including the one featuring Susan Sarandon.

Dan Forcella of TV Fanatic was also positive toward the episode, praising the character of Angie and saying that "everything about [the] spoof worked", whilst Ian McDonald of TVOverMind said that the humour in the episode "reads like a checklist for 'Housewife' reality shows to adhere to" and concluded that "including the minor hiccups, 'Queen of Jordan' was the best episode of the season, if not the most memorable".
