= The Fabian Strategy =

- 30 Rock episode
- Episode no.: Season 5 Episode 1
- Directed by: Beth McCarthy-Miller
- Written by: Tina Fey
- Production code: 501
- Original air date: September 23, 2010

Guest appearances
- Mario Brassard as James; Matt Damon as Carol; Jan Owen as Grace; Paula Pell as Paula Hornberger; Jeffrey Schara as the new NBC page

Episode chronology
← Previous "I Do Do"	Next → "When It Rains, It Pours"
- 30 Rock season 5

"The Fabian Strategy" is the first episode of the fifth season of the American television comedy series 30 Rock, and the 81st overall episode of the series. It was directed by Beth McCarthy-Miller, and written by series creator, executive producer and lead actress Tina Fey. The episode originally aired on NBC in the United States on September 23, 2010. Guest stars in this episode include Mario Brassard, Matt Damon, Jan Owen, Paula Pell, and Jeffrey Schara.

In the episode, Jack Donaghy (Alec Baldwin) interferes in Liz Lemon's (Fey) relationship with Carol (Damon) as he is determined to help Liz have a relationship that lasts for once. At the same time, Jack struggles to compromise with his girlfriend Avery Jessup (Elizabeth Banks) as she redecorates his apartment. Meanwhile, Tracy Jordan (Tracy Morgan) has trouble coming to terms with Kenneth Parcell (Jack McBrayer) getting fired as an NBC page and Jenna Maroney (Jane Krakowski) becomes a producer of the fictional sketch comedy show The Girlie Show with Tracy Jordan (TGS). This episode also continued a story arc involving Carol as a love interest for Liz, which began in the previous episode, the season finale of the show's fourth season "I Do Do".

Before the airing, NBC moved the program to a new timeslot at 8:30 p.m., moving it from its 9:30 p.m. slot. This episode of 30 Rock received generally positive reviews from television critics. According to Nielsen Media Research, it was watched by 5.85 million households during its original broadcast, and received a 2.6 rating/8 share among viewers in the 18–49 demographic.

== Plot ==
Liz Lemon (Tina Fey), the head writer of the sketch show TGS with Tracy Jordan, goes back to work following the summer break and prepares for the show's fifth season. At the 30 Rock building, where she works, Liz and TGS producer Pete Hornberger (Scott Adsit) meet their boss, Jack Donaghy (Alec Baldwin) to discuss cutting the show's expenses. During the meeting, Pete reveals that star Jenna Maroney (Jane Krakowski) now has a producer credit because of changes in her contract that were not set to start until the fifth season of TGS (nobody thought that the show would last that long). Jenna takes this role seriously and takes on the job of firing people. Eventually, on reviewing the budget, she realizes that her producer credit is costly—and unnecessary—and asks Pete to fire her.

Later, Jack asks Liz about her relationship with her boyfriend Carol (Matt Damon), an airline pilot. She tells him that during the summer break the two met twice a month in a hotel. Jack does not believe that the relationship is serious since Carol never stays at Liz's apartment. He decides to force Carol to stay with Liz and reserves all the rooms of the hotel that Liz and Carol stay in when he is in New York. During his stay with Liz, Carol bursts into tears and asks her where their relationship is heading as he believes that she is resisting him, which she denies. The next day, Carol decides to leave New York early, but tells Liz that they need to work on their relationship. The two go their separate ways and agree to meet again on October 14.

During the summer break, Jack's girlfriend CNBC host Avery Jessup (Elizabeth Banks) moved in with him. Avery decides to redecorate Jack's apartment. He is not keen on the idea, but not wanting to say no or give into Avery's demands, decides to employ the Fabian strategy—named after Fabius Maximus, a Roman general who employed a strategy of avoiding battles, instead wearing the enemy down by attrition. Jack is successful in avoiding redecorating the apartment; he agrees to knock down a wall instead. At the end of the episode, however, he realizes that Avery has emulated the military genius of Hannibal, outmaneuvering his Fabian strategy, and he ecstatically realizes they are a perfect match, far beyond the level of mere soul-mates.

Elsewhere, Tracy Jordan (Tracy Morgan) is missing Kenneth Parcell (Jack McBrayer), a former NBC page who was fired in the previous episode, "I Do Do". When Tracy returns to work for the new season of TGS, he begins to hallucinate Kenneth everywhere he goes, mistaking the new page (Jeffrey Schara) and Liz for him. Later, Tracy roams the city and sees Kenneth, who is now working as a page at CBS. Tracy believes Kenneth is a hallucination. Later, the two run into each other again and Kenneth tries to talk to Tracy, but Tracy refuses to acknowledge him as he believes his mind is playing tricks on him. To prove he is real, Kenneth throws himself in front of a car, thus making Tracy believe him. He pleads with Kenneth to come back to NBC, but Kenneth says he is happy working at CBS. At the end of the credits, Kenneth admits to himself that he lied to Tracy and that he misses everyone at TGS. Kenneth then starts hallucinating Tracy.

== Production ==
"The Fabian Strategy" was written by series creator, executive producer and lead actress Tina Fey, and directed by Beth McCarthy-Miller, a long-time television director who worked with Fey on the sketch comedy show Saturday Night Live. This was Fey's twenty-second writing credit, and McCarthy-Miller's thirteenth helmed episode. "The Fabian Strategy" originally aired on NBC in the United States on September 23, 2010, as the season premiere episode of the show's fifth season and the 81st overall episode of the series. This episode of 30 Rock was filmed on August 30, 2010.

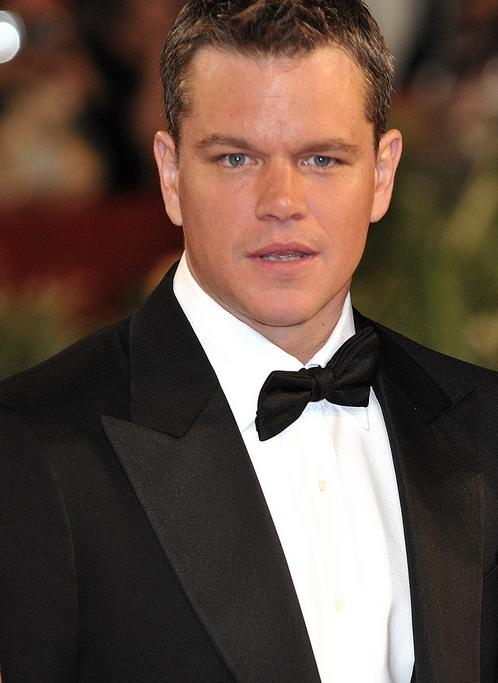
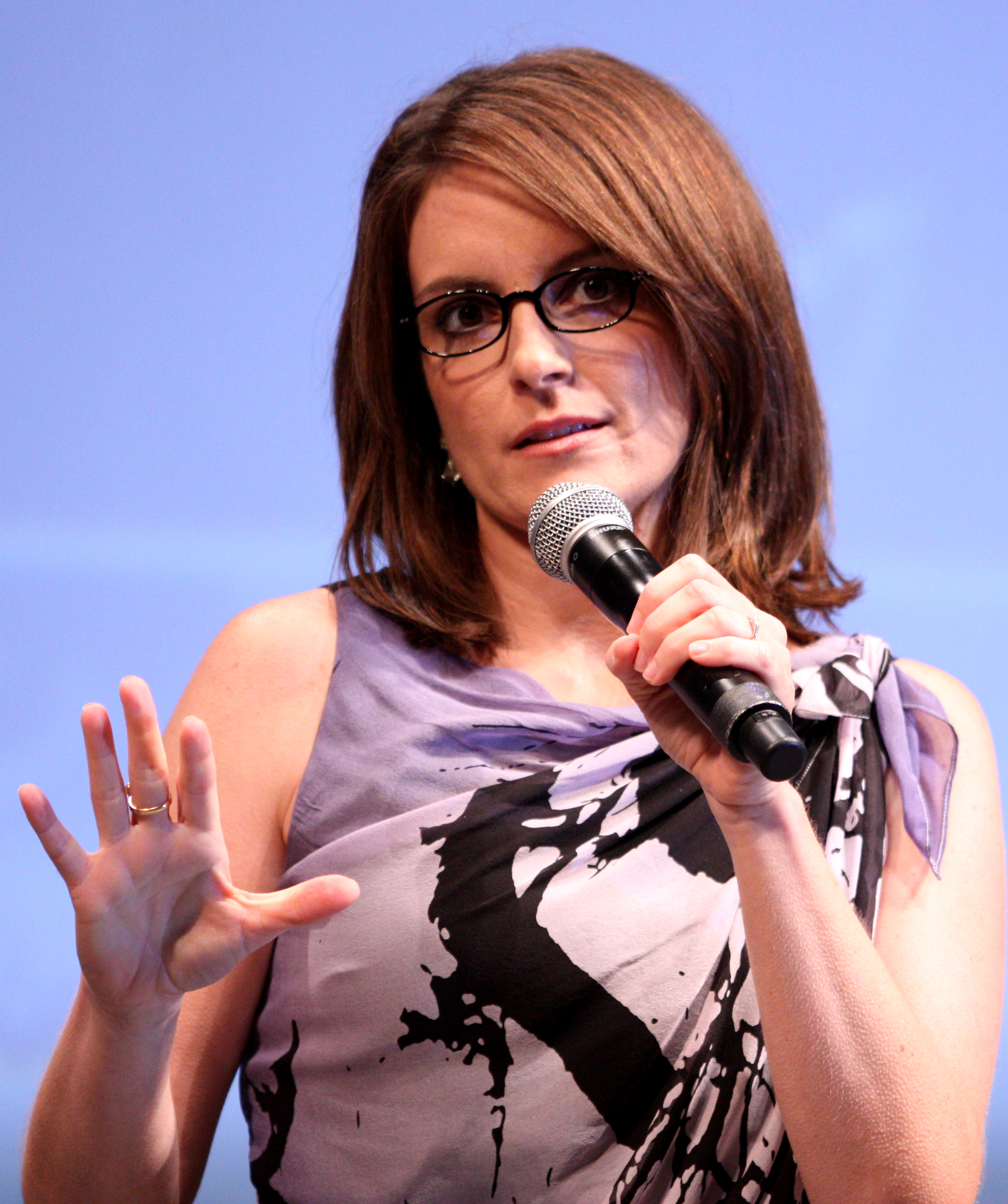
Matt Damon (left) made his second guest appearance as Carol, a love interest for Tina Fey's (right) character, Liz Lemon.

In March 2010, it was announced that actor Matt Damon would guest star on 30 Rock. He made his debut in the fourth season finale episode "I Do Do" as Carol, an airline pilot and love interest for Fey's character, Liz Lemon, and reprised the role in "The Fabian Strategy". In December 2009, prior to the confirmation of his first guest appearance, Entertainment Weekly informed Damon that he was at the top of Fey's guest star wish list for the show. A fan of the series, Damon replied "I would do [30 Rock] in a heartbeat if they asked me to come on. She should call my people—or even better me. Or I could call her. Let's make this happen." A day after the airing of "I Do Do" he was asked if he would reprise his role as Carol in the upcoming season and responded "If they'll have me, I would love to pop in and see the gang again. I had a great time doing it." In August 2010, Fey confirmed Damon's return saying that he would play her boyfriend once the new season began.

Jane Krakowski, who plays Jenna Maroney, revealed to Entertainment Weekly's Michael Ausiello her character's plot in which Jenna becomes a television producer as part of her contract as TGS begins its fifth season. "[Jenna] has all these wacky things built into her contract [that kick in at this point], because nobody thought we'd still be on the air. So I get to be a producer." Series producer Paula Pell reprised her role as Paula Hornberger, the wife of Scott Adsit's character Pete Hornberger. The episode references the ongoing storyline of Liz's desire to become a mother when she tells Carol that she is on a waiting list to adopt a child. This story first began in the show's first season, and continued in the third season.

Two months after the airing of the fourth season finale episode, co-showrunner and executive producer Robert Carlock was asked if Jack McBrayer's character Kenneth Parcell would return in the upcoming season after he was fired as an NBC page in "I Do Do". Carlock said "We haven't cracked [how] he is getting [his job] back, but of course he will get back somehow. We wanted a fun thing to shuffle the deck a little bit and send him off into the world. Of course, he will miss it and he will be missed. Events will bring him back." In "The Fabian Strategy", Kenneth is now working at CBS as a page for the Late Show with David Letterman. The scene in which Kenneth throws himself in front of a car to prove to Tracy Jordan that he is real and not Tracy's imagination was filmed on August 27, 2010, in front of the Ed Sullivan Theater.

== Cultural references ==
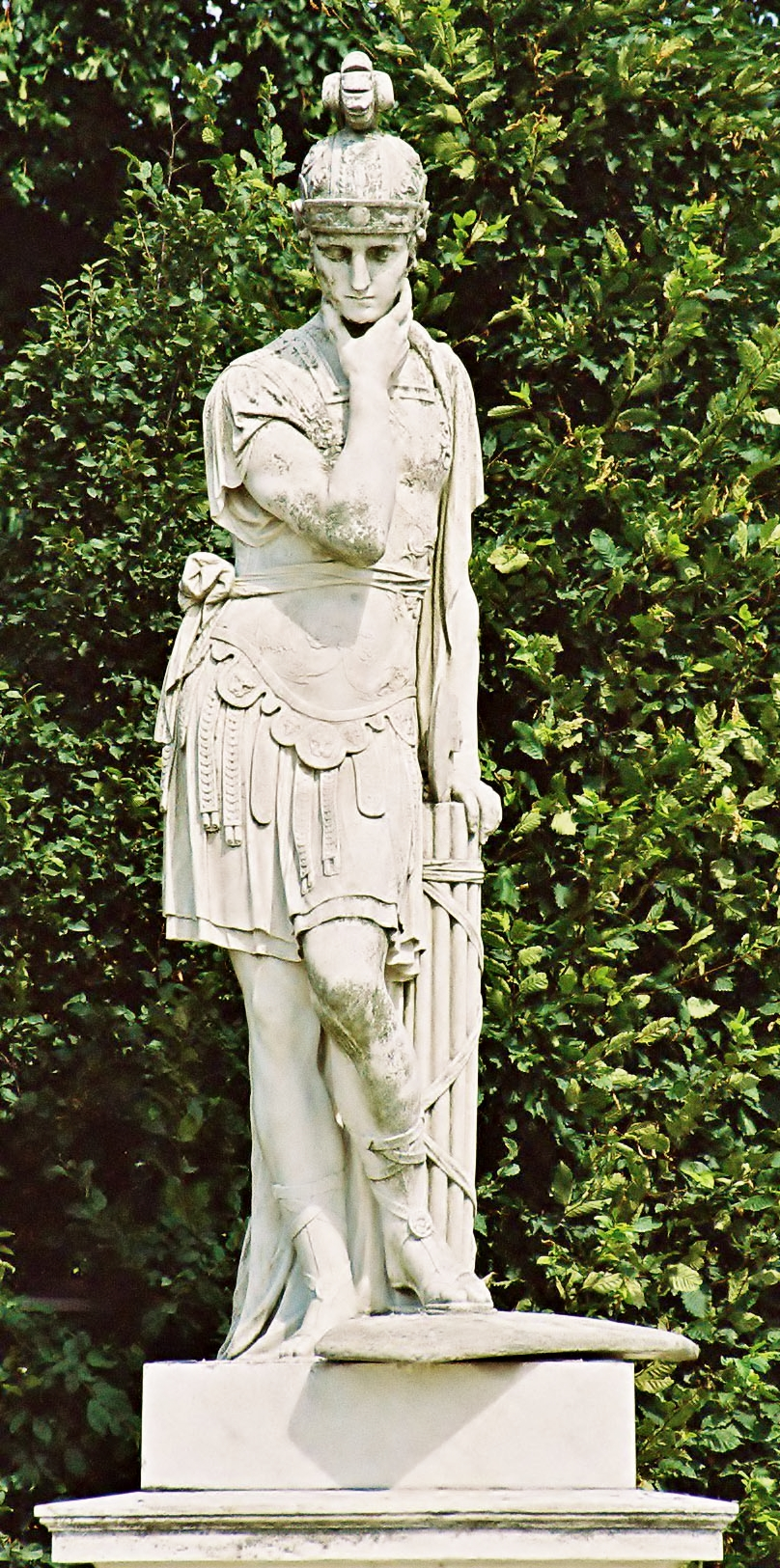
Jack employs the Fabian strategy named after Roman general Fabius Maximus (pictured), who delayed direct battle with Hannibal to take advantage of the Carthaginian's supply weaknesses

At the start of the episode, Liz says while sleeping, "No, Tom Jones, no!" before waking up. This is a reference to a future plot in the episode "Reaganing" in which Liz is having intimacy issues because of a traumatic incident from her childhood that involved a poster of singer Tom Jones. Throughout the episode, Jack refers to the Fabian strategy, a strategy named after Roman general Fabius Maximus, which avoids direct battle in favor of attrition warfare. Jack uses the strategy as he does not want to say no to Avery or give in to her demands. In addition, Jack hails Fabius Maximus as his role model. When Carol surprises Liz at the TGS writers' room, staff writer J.D. Lutz (John Lutz) asks Carol if he is on Facebook. Later, Liz tells Jack not to interfere in her relationship with Carol, as she believes she has the perfect relationship with him. She reveals that she is modeling her life on that of chef Ina Garten of the Food Network show Barefoot Contessa. Jack responds by saying that Liz will never be like Garten, including the "barefoot" part, referring to the fact that Liz has never let anyone see her feet, which is a real life trait of Fey's.

Liz and Carol discover that one of the things they have in common is that they both love to watch The Muppets presenting award shows. Later, Liz reveals that she has a Life Alert Emergency Response necklace; this necklace helps the elderly contact emergency services in case of an accident. Carol wonders why Geico—an auto insurance company—has multiple mascots, a reference to Geico's advertising campaigns. Jack plans to seduce the gay interior designer that Avery hired and hopes to get the designer to agree with him to leave the apartment the way it is, explaining to Liz "Do you know what a prize I am in the gay community? There's a term for it. I'm a bear. And I'm a daddy. I'm a daddy bear." Before parting ways, Liz says to Carol "See you October 14", a reference to the live episode of 30 Rock entitled "Live Show" that aired on October 14, 2010.

30 Rock and Studio 60 on the Sunset Strip—both of which debuted on 2006–07 NBC lineup—revolved around the off-camera happenings on a sketch comedy series. Evidence of the overlapping subject matter between the shows, as well as the conflict between them, arose when Aaron Sorkin, the creator of Studio 60 on the Sunset Strip, asked Lorne Michaels to allow him to observe Saturday Night Live for a week, a request Michaels, the creator of Saturday Night Live and executive producer of 30 Rock, denied. Despite this, Sorkin sent Fey flowers after NBC announced it would pick up both programs, and wished her luck with 30 Rock. Fey succeeded where Sorkin did not when Studio 60 on the Sunset Strip was canceled after one season and 30 Rock was renewed for a second. Though 30 Rock's first season ratings proved lackluster and were lower than those of Studio 60 on the Sunset Strip, the latter was more expensive to produce. In the ending sequence of "The Fabian Strategy", Kenneth watches the credits for TGS, which include Ricky Tahoe and Ronnie Oswald as writers, the two former head writers on Studio 60 on the Sunset Strip.

== Reception ==
Before the airing of this episode, NBC unveiled its 2010–11 primetime schedule in May 2010 with the network moving the program from the 9:30 p.m. time to the 8:30 p.m. timeslot. According to the Nielsen Media Research, this episode of 30 Rock was watched by 5.85 million households in its original American broadcast. It earned a 2.6 rating/8 share in the 18–49 demographic. This means that it was seen by 2.6 percent of all 18- to 49-year-olds, and 8 percent of all 18- to 49-year-olds watching television at the time of the broadcast. A contributor from Variety reported that Community, an NBC show that airs at 8:00 p.m., and 30 Rock "held up nicely" in their respective timeslots and that the two programs "were up over last year's opening Thursday hour for NBC in premiere week."

The A.V. Club's Nathan Rabin reported that past season premieres of 30 Rock had a solid track record as being the worst episodes of the season, nonetheless Rabin found "The Fabian Strategy" hilarious and breaking that barrier. He wrote that Matt Damon has been great on the show as Carol; however, his only complaint was Carol's character flaw as being too sensitive. Rabin, who has complained "extensively" about Jenna's character in the past, said the character was in "fine form" in her role as a TGS producer. Rabin gave the episode an A− grade rating. Bob Sassone of TV Squad deemed this episode a "solid season-opener" that featured "lots of great lines and plot development". Meredith Blake, a contributor from the Los Angeles Times, was thrilled that the Jack and Avery relationship "not only lasted the summer, but is thriving", and wrote that she was looking forward to the pregnancy storyline involving Avery. Blake noted that Damon's character was "darn-near perfect, by which I mean 'a male version of Liz.'" Television columnist Alan Sepinwall for HitFix said that "The Fabian Strategy" did not "live up to the good old days" of past episodes, nonetheless reported that he "laughed enough" and was pleased with the direction the show took Liz and Carol's relationship. Sepinwall did not like Tracy and Kenneth's story, calling it a complete miss, but was appreciative of the other storylines, choosing Pete and Jenna's as his favorite. Alessandra Stanley from The New York Times was positive about Damon's role on the show, noting that he has been a "hoot". Scott Eidler of The Cornell Daily Sun commented that the episode was a "nice start to the [fifth] season" of 30 Rock as it was "perhaps more plot-driven than packed with the emotional and uproariously funny episodes that concluded last season." Eidler commented that "The Fabian Strategy" never did "[reach] the utter hilariousness of last season, but I hope that wasn't the climax ... and it can eventually return to its previous heights of hilarity". TV Guide's Bruce Fretts was complimentary towards Damon's role as Tina Fey's love interest, writing that Damon "showed a refreshingly silly side in keeping with 30 Rock's anything-goes spirit." Matt Wilstein of The Huffington Post called the premiere "a very solid first episode", enjoying Damon's part on the show and the Kenneth story of him still being fired by NBC.

Time contributor James Poniewozik reported that the Pete/Jenna and Tracy/Kenneth plots were a "hit-and-miss", however noted it was good to see the show giving the Jack and Liz characters "ongoing direction, not just in their personal lives". The Atlantic's Caitlan Smith was skeptical about Liz and Carol's relationship lasting, saying that Damon "who commands more than $20 million per movie, won't stick around for long, leaving Liz Lemon Carol-less and in for another round of the entertaining self-loathing that we've all been coming back for four seasons."
