= Emanuelle Goes to Dinosaur Land =

- 30 Rock episode
- Episode no.: Season 4 Episode 21
- Directed by: Beth McCarthy-Miller
- Written by: Matt Hubbard
- Production code: 421
- Original air date: May 13, 2010

Guest appearances
- John Anderson as Mike; Elizabeth Banks as Avery Jessup; Jon Hamm as Drew Baird; Kristin McGee as Kaitlin; Julianne Moore as Nancy Donovan; Michael Sheen as Wesley Snipes; Jason Sudeikis as Floyd DeBarber; Dean Winters as Dennis Duffy

Episode chronology
← Previous "The Moms"	Next → "I Do Do"
- 30 Rock season 4

"Emmanuelle Goes to Dinosaur Land" is the twenty-first episode of the fourth season of the American television comedy series 30 Rock, and the 79th overall episode of the series. It was written by supervising producer Matt Hubbard and directed by Beth McCarthy-Miller. The episode originally aired on NBC in the United States on May 13, 2010. Guest stars in this episode include John Anderson, Elizabeth Banks, Jon Hamm, Kristin McGee, Julianne Moore, Michael Sheen, Jason Sudeikis, and Dean Winters.

In the episode, Jack Donaghy (Alec Baldwin) becomes even more entangled in his love triangle between Avery Jessup (Banks) and Nancy Donovan (Moore), and he turns for advice to Liz Lemon (Tina Fey), who is focusing on her own romantic problems. When Liz cannot find a date to her ex-boyfriend's (Sudeikis) wedding, she revisits her old boyfriends Drew and Dennis (Hamm and Winters) in hope that a spark will reignite. Meanwhile, Tracy Jordan (Tracy Morgan) continues his journey to earn his EGOT.

"Emmanuelle Goes to Dinosaur Land" received generally positive reviews from television critics. According to the Nielsen Media Research, the episode was watched by 4.996 million households during its original broadcast, and received a 2.5 rating/7 share among viewers in the 18–49 demographic. For his performance in this episode, Jon Hamm received a Primetime Emmy Award nomination in the category for Primetime Emmy Award for Outstanding Guest Actor in a Comedy Series.

== Plot ==
Liz Lemon (Tina Fey) is dateless for ex-boyfriend Floyd DeBarber's (Jason Sudeikis) wedding, and does not want to be alone. She revisits her old boyfriends—Drew Baird (Jon Hamm) and Dennis Duffy (Dean Winters)—but the visits do not go well. Later, at a party, Liz learns from Cerie Xerox (Katrina Bowden), her office assistant, that she will be seated next to Wesley Snipes (Michael Sheen)—a man whom Liz despises—at Cerie's wedding. As a result of this, Liz invites Wesley as her date to Floyd's wedding. At the wedding, Wesley reveals that he has lost his job, and needs Liz to get him U.S. residency, and proposes marriage to her. After an unsuccessful conversation with Mike (John Anderson), a friend of Floyd's, Liz agrees to marry Wesley.

Meanwhile, Jack Donaghy (Alec Baldwin) is still in a dilemma in whom to choose from between CNBC host Avery Jessup (Elizabeth Banks) and his high school sweetheart Nancy Donovan (Julianne Moore). Avery decides not to be Jack's date to Cerie's wedding, and that while she is gone, Jack should think about whether or not he wants to be with her. As soon as Avery leaves, Nancy shows up at the 30 Rock building unannounced, and decides to spend the weekend with Jack. Liz tries to talk him out of going on a date with Nancy after he asked her for advice. He decides to keep things platonic with Nancy, so that no problem ensues in his decision to choose between them, but Jack ends up sleeping with Nancy. The next morning, Nancy admits that the two spending the night together was a big deal, as Jack was the first man she slept with after her divorce. At Floyd's wedding, Jack tells Nancy about Avery, and as a result, Nancy threatens to leave him forever once the ceremony is over. While Liz gives a reading, Jack texts her to stall, resulting in Liz reading inappropriate scripture recitations at the wedding.

Finally, Tracy Jordan (Tracy Morgan) informs "Dot Com" Slattery (Kevin Brown) and NBC page Kenneth Parcell (Jack McBrayer) that he wishes to be part of the film Garfield 3: Feline Groovy. Dot Com and Kenneth tell Tracy that he should instead focus on his chances of getting an Oscar, as part of his EGOT quest. The two encourage him to audition for Hard To Watch, a story of an inner-city boy living in the ghetto, something that Tracy can directly relate to. Tracy decides to audition for Hard To Watch, but realizes that playing the role may bring up too many repressed memories. Dot Com and Kenneth, along with Tracy, visit all the places from Tracy's childhood in order to prepare him for the role, but this backfires when Tracy is brought to tears because of his past.

== Production ==
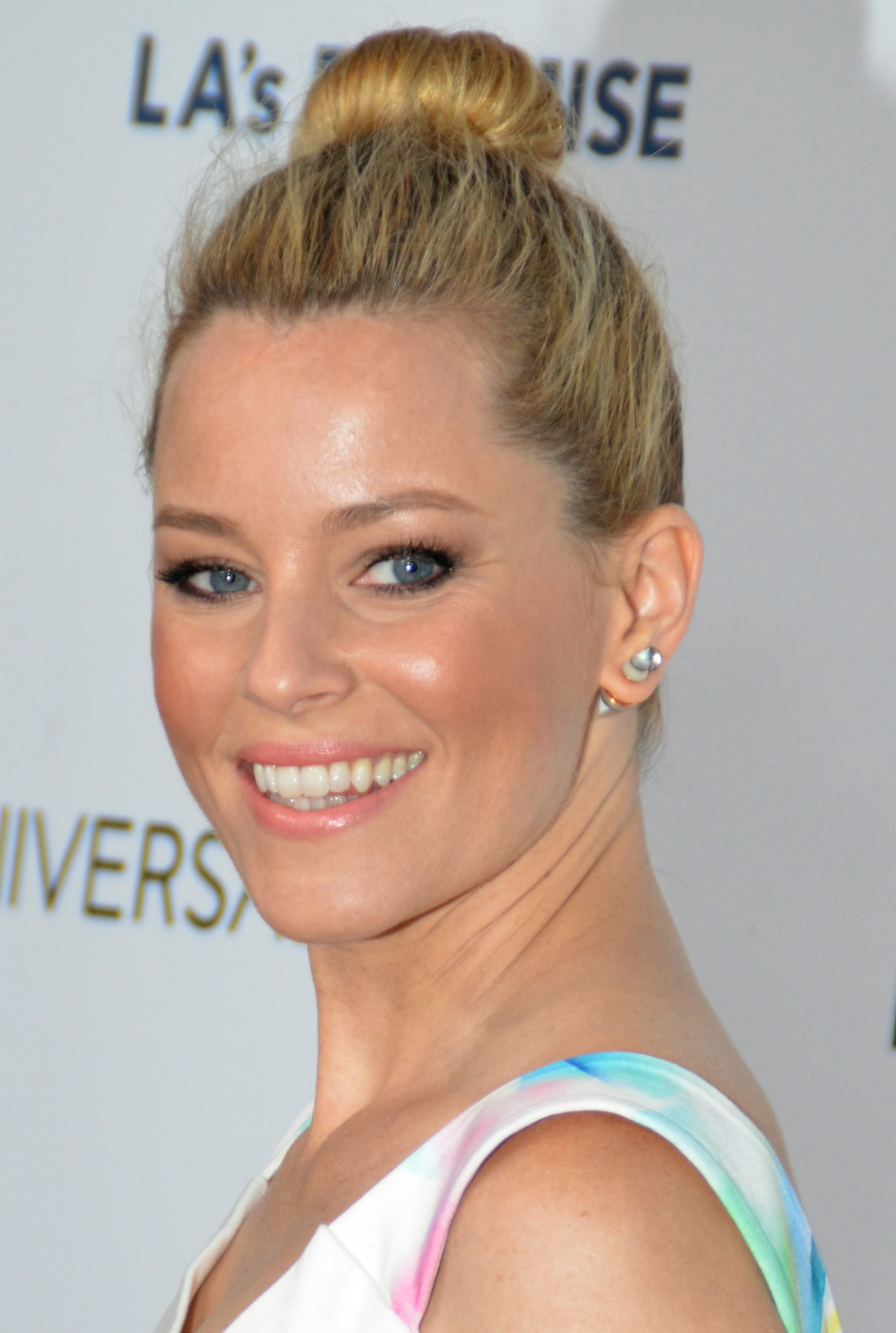
Elizabeth Banks made her sixth guest spot as Avery Jessup

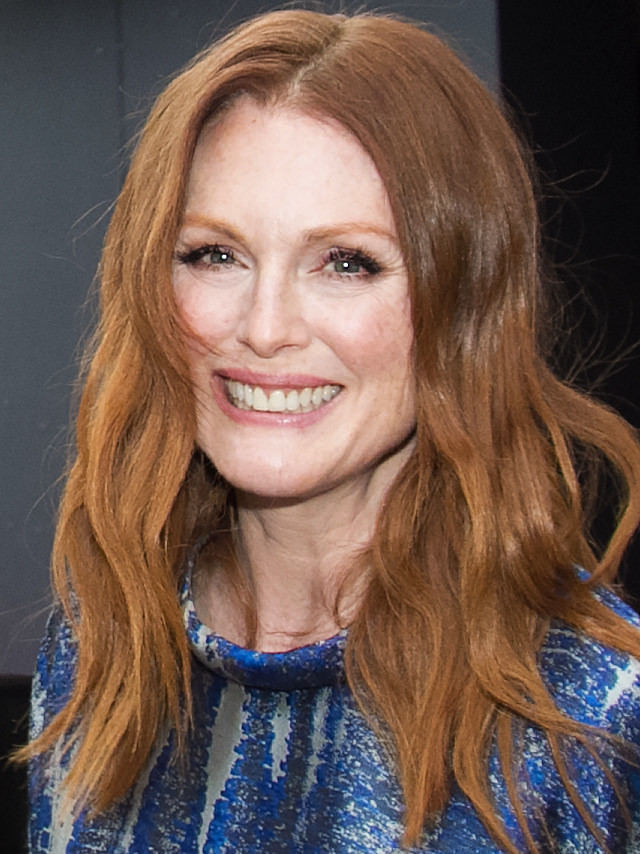
Julianne Moore made her fourth appearance with this episode as Nancy Donovan

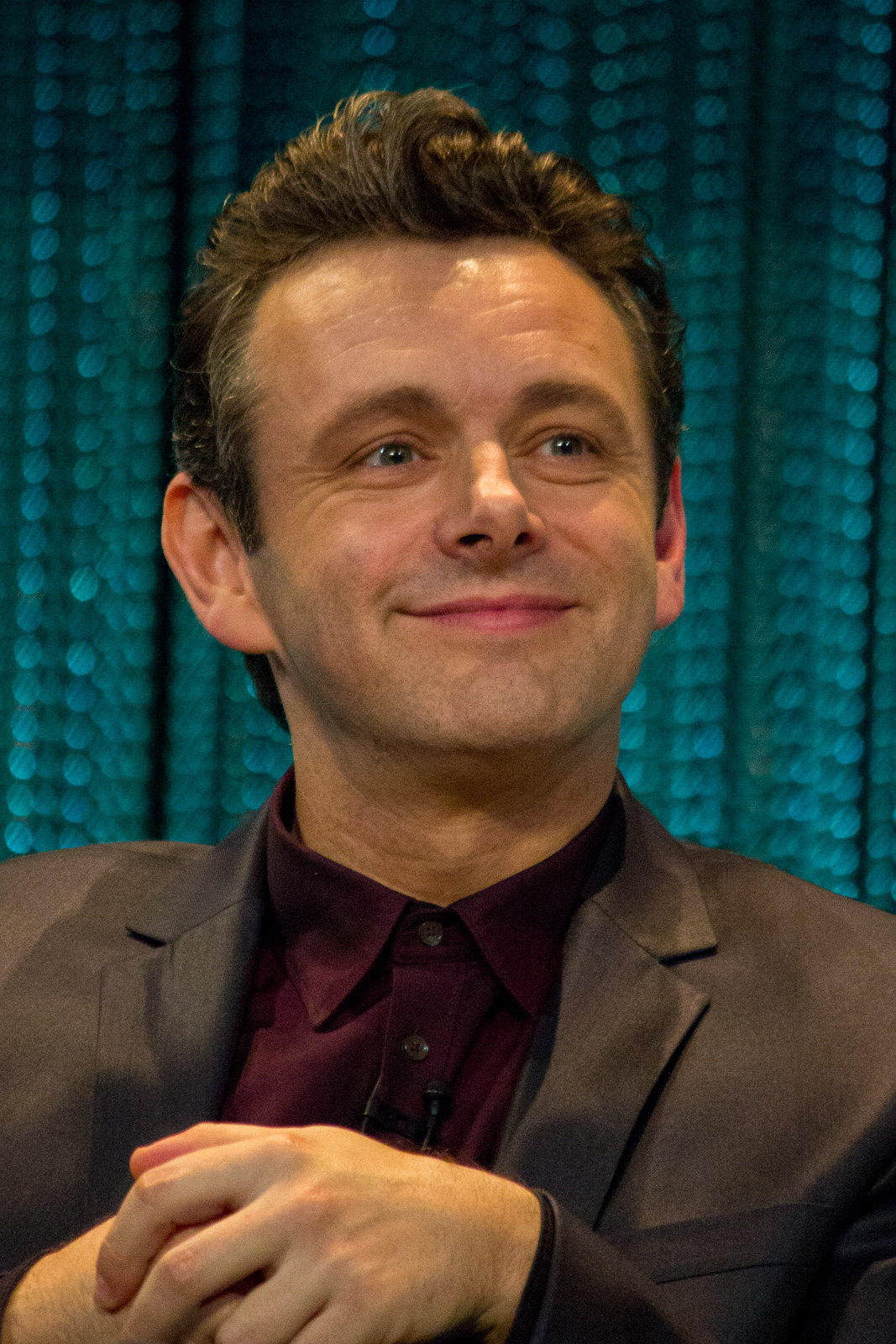
Michael Sheen reprised his role as Wesley Snipes

"Emmanuelle Goes to Dinosaur Land" was written by series supervising producer Matt Hubbard, making it his tenth writing credit after "The Rural Juror", "Hard Ball", "The Collection", "MILF Island", "Reunion", "Larry King", "Cutbacks", "Audition Day", and "Anna Howard Shaw Day". The episode was directed by Beth McCarthy-Miller, making it her twelfth for the series. "Emmanuelle Goes to Dinosaur Land" originally aired in the United States on May 13, 2010, on NBC as the twenty-first episode of the show's fourth season and the 79th overall episode of the series.

This episode was filmed on March 10, 2010. Saint Cecilia's Catholic Church in Greenpoint, Brooklyn served as the church for Floyd and Kaitlin's (Kristin McGee) wedding. This episode of 30 Rock was actress Julianne Moore's fourth appearance as Nancy Donovan on the show, and was actress Elizabeth Banks' sixth guest spot. Comedian actor Jason Sudeikis, who played Floyd DeBarber in this episode, has appeared in the main cast of Saturday Night Live (SNL), a weekly sketch comedy series which airs on NBC in the United States. Tina Fey, the series creator of 30 Rock, was the head writer on SNL from 1999 until 2006. This was Sudeikis's eleventh appearance on the show. Actor Michael Sheen made his third appearance as Wesley Snipes. In addition, actors Jon Hamm and Dean Winters reprised their roles as Drew Baird and Dennis Duffy, respectively, as former boyfriends of Liz Lemon.

This was the third time the show referenced Tracy Jordan trying to get his EGOT. This plot first began in the December 3, 2009, episode "Dealbreakers Talk Show" in which Tracy finds a diamond encrusted "EGOT" necklace and sets a new life goal to achieve EGOT status by winning four major awards: an Emmy, a Grammy, an Oscar, and a Tony. In "Emmanuelle Goes to Dinosaur Land", Tracy decides to do the movie Hard To Watch, in hopes that he can get an Oscar for his performance.

== Cultural references ==
Tracy decides to play the Garfield character—an orange tabby cat—in an upcoming film Garfield 3: Feline Groovy. When Liz visits Drew, in hopes that he can be her date to Floyd's wedding, Drew is surprised to see Liz, but tells her that he was thinking about her when he saw "this gorgeous woman ... putting glasses on her daughter's Mrs. Potato Head." Later, at a park, Liz visits Dennis, in which she sees that he is building a strange contraption. Dennis tells her that he is trying to recreate and improve on the Balloon boy incident, a reference to the October 2009 hoax in which two parents claimed their son was on board a helium balloon that had floated away, but later turned out to be a publicity stunt. At Floyd's wedding, Wesley, who is English, tells Liz that he does not want to go back to England, as he does not want to witness the 2012 Summer Olympics, which is scheduled to take place in London, explaining "Did you see the Beijing opening ceremonies? We don't have control over our people like that." The episode's title is a reference to the Emmanuelle series of erotic films.

== Reception ==
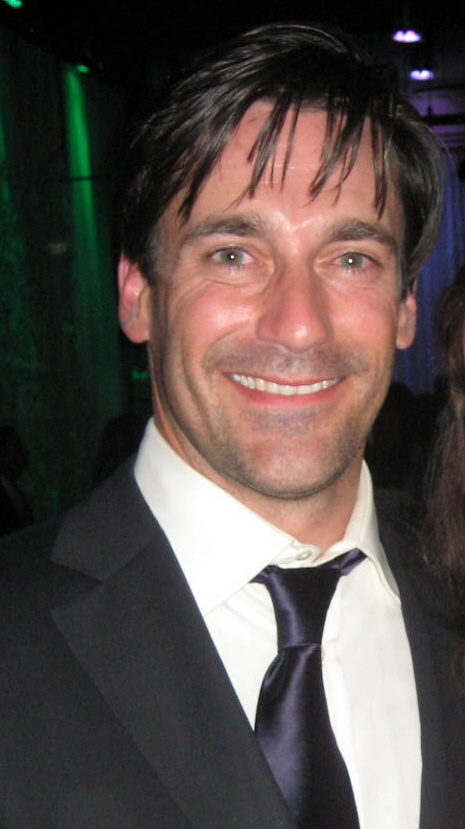
Jon Hamm received a nomination for the Primetime Emmy Award for Outstanding Guest Actor in a Comedy Series for his performance in this episode.

According to the Nielsen Media Research, "Emmanuelle Goes to Dinosaur Land" was watched by 4.996 million households in its original American broadcast. It earned a 2.5 rating/7 share in the 18–49 demographic. This means that it was seen by 2.5 percent of all 18- to 49-year-olds, and 7 percent of all 18- to 49-year-olds watching television at the time of the broadcast. This was a decrease from the previous episode, "The Moms", which was watched by 5.420 million American viewers. During its original broadcast, "Emmanuelle Goes to Dinosaur Land" ranked fourth in its 9:30 p.m. slot, behind ABC's Grey's Anatomy, CBS' CSI: Crime Scene Investigation, and Fox's Fringe. Jon Hamm received a Primetime Emmy Award nomination for Outstanding Guest Actor in a Comedy Series at the 62nd Primetime Emmy Awards for his work in this episode, but lost it to actor Neil Patrick Harris for his guest appearance on Glee. "Emmanuelle Goes to Dinosaur Land" received generally positive reviews from television critics.

Bob Sassone of AOL's TV Squad liked the episode because of its "non-stop one liners and great guest cameos." Sassone's only complaint was that the Jack, Nancy, and Avery love triangle be over, pointing out that he was sick of seeing Jack running around trying to keep Avery and Nancy from seeing each other. IGN contributor Robert Canning said that "we got one of the best episode titles of any show this year", and was favorable to the guest spots from Jon Hamm, Dean Winters, and Michael Sheen, observing "[t]he episode joyfully gave us three great pairings for Liz to deal with, each presenting their own unique set of laughs." In conclusion, Canning gave the episode a 9 out of 10 rating. Linda Holmes for National Public Radio said that "Emmanuelle Goes to Dinosaur Land" was "very funny", and commented that her favorite scene was when Liz visited Drew in hopes that the two can get back together.

The A.V. Club's Nathan Rabin commented that this episode might have been the "best Tracy [Jordan] episode of the season" explaining that Tracy Morgan "delivered one genius non sequitur after another describing the comically over-the-top horrors of his childhood. [...] The insane, eminently quotable one-liners were flying so fast and so furious that I could barely keep up with them." In regards to Jack's love triangle, Rabin opined that this arc "could easily have worn out its welcome long ago" but that Alec Baldwin, Julianne Moore, and Elizabeth Banks "have kept lively and vibrant." In conclusion, he gave it an A− grade rating. Meredith Blake, writing for the Los Angeles Times, was positive about Liz getting engaged, noting that she has become a woman, and concluded that "it will no doubt be one of television's most memorable weddings" if Liz and Wesley get married. Nick Catucci of New York magazine said that "Emmanuelle Goes to Dinosaur Land" was good, "[m]aybe the best episode ever." TV Guide's Adam Mersel said that Banks played her role "perfectly", but that he was still not convinced that Sheen's Wesley is the right man for Liz.
