= Respawn (30 Rock) =

- 30 Rock episode
- Episode no.: Season 5 Episode 23
- Directed by: Don Scardino
- Written by: Hannibal Buress; Ron Weiner
- Production code: 523
- Original air date: May 5, 2011

Guest appearances
- Victor Garber as Eugene Gremby; Chris Parnell as "Dr." Spaceman; Will Forte as Paul L'Astnamé; Donna Mitchell as U. Jean Gremby; Ina Garten as herself; Adriane Lenox as Sherry

Episode chronology
← Previous "Everything Sunny All the Time Always"	Next → "Dance Like Nobody's Watching"
- 30 Rock season 5

"Respawn" is the twenty-third episode and season finale of the fifth season of the American television comedy series 30 Rock, and the 103rd overall episode of the series. It was directed by Don Scardino, and written by Hannibal Buress and Ron Weiner. The episode originally aired on NBC in the United States on May 5, 2011. Guest stars in this episode include Victor Garber, Chris Parnell, Will Forte, Adriane Lenox, and Ina Garten.

In the episode, TGS head writer Liz Lemon (Tina Fey) has her vacation ruined when Tracy Jordan (Tracy Morgan) shows up; Jack Donaghy (Alec Baldwin) uses Kenneth Parcell (Jack McBrayer) to get over the abduction of his wife Avery (Elizabeth Banks); Jenna Maroney (Jane Krakowski) has to choose between her role as spokeswoman for the Wool Council and her relationship with Paul (Will Forte); and the TGS writers are engaged in a continuous Halo: Reach session.

== Plot ==
With the fifth season of TGS with Tracy Jordan over and having been fined for incurring a hate crime against what the council is claiming to be a "Jewish tree" in the previous episode, Liz Lemon (Tina Fey) escapes to The Hamptons for a relaxing summer vacation. However, her peace and quiet is disturbed when she discovers that Tracy Jordan (Tracy Morgan) is staying in the house next door to hers and plans on having a disruptive summer full of loud partying.

Meanwhile, Jack Donaghy (Alec Baldwin) is coming to terms with the abduction of his wife Avery (Elizabeth Banks) by North Korean dictator Kim Jong-il. He begins to grow very close to Kenneth Parcell (Jack McBrayer), as he seeks to fill the void left in his life by Avery's absence. Elsewhere, Jenna Maroney (Jane Krakowski) has been made honorary spokeswoman of the Wool Council. Her new employer, Eugene Gremby (special guest star Victor Garber), warns her that her relationship with boyfriend and crossdresser Paul (Will Forte) creates an unwholesome image that the council doesn't wish to be associated with.

Back at TGS, the writers celebrate the end of the season by having a Halo: Reach marathon. In the marathon, they each avoid being killed by one of the others by purposefully dying and "respawning". In order to get away from Tracy, Liz refuses to pay her fine and is sentenced to community service all summer. Meanwhile, Kenneth is forced to literally take on the role of Avery in order to make Jack see what he is doing to him. Moreover, Jenna decides that her relationship with Paul is more important than the Wool Council. With the summer over, Liz returns to TGS and finds the writers still playing Halo: Reach.

== Reception ==
According to the Nielsen Media Research, this episode of 30 Rock was watched by 4.20 million households in its original American broadcast. It earned a 2.1 rating/6 share in the 18–49 demographic. This means that it was seen by 2.1 percent of all 18- to 49-year-olds, and 6 percent of all 18- to 49-year-olds watching television at the time of the broadcast.
