= 100 (30 Rock) =

- 30 Rock episodes
- Episode nos.: Season 5 Episodes 20/21
- Directed by: Don Scardino
- Written by: Jack Burditt; Robert Carlock; Tina Fey
- Production code: 520/521
- Original air date: April 21, 2011

Guest appearances
- Michael Keaton as Tom the Janitor; Tom Hanks as himself; Dean Winters as Dennis Duffy; Ken Howard as Hank Hooper; Cheyenne Jackson as Danny Baker; Rachel Dratch as Blue Man / Greta; Will Forte as Paul; Chris Parnell as Leo Spaceman; Brian Williams as himself; Matt Lauer as himself; Regis Philbin as himself; Kelly Ripa as herself; Rachael Ray as herself; Hannibal Buress as a homeless man; Ben Sinclair as a Brooklynite; Bono as himself

Episode chronology
← Previous "I Heart Connecticut"	Next → "Everything Sunny All the Time Always"
- 30 Rock season 5

"100" is a double episode of the American television comedy series 30 Rock, comprising the 20th and 21st episodes of the fifth season, and the 100th and 101st episodes overall of the series. It was written by Jack Burditt and the show's executive producers Robert Carlock and Tina Fey, who is also the series' creator, head writer, and star. The episode originally aired on NBC in the United States on April 21, 2011. Commemorating the 100th episode of the series, this episode was one hour long and included a multitude of guest stars including Michael Keaton, Tom Hanks, Rachel Dratch, Will Forte, Brian Williams, among others.

In the episode, Liz Lemon (Tina Fey) faces news of cancellation for TGS from Hank Hooper after the departure of Tracy Jordan (Tracy Morgan) brought in terrible ratings. Jack Donaghy (Alec Baldwin) promises Hank the return of Tracy and asks for one more chance for TGS to prove itself with its 100th episode. Meanwhile, a gas leak in the building leads to hallucinations among the characters, such as Jack's imaginings of alternate versions of himself visiting him. In a subplot, Jenna Maroney (Jane Krakowski) considers becoming a mother following a joke she made to Kenneth Parcell (Jack McBrayer) five years earlier.

== Plot ==
Hank Hooper (Ken Howard), CEO of the fictional NBC parent Kabletown, informs Liz Lemon (Tina Fey) and Jack Donaghy (Alec Baldwin) of his decision to cancel TGS due to its struggles during the absence of Tracy Jordan (Tracy Morgan). Jack supports Liz, informing Hank that Tracy is returning and convinces him to reconsider the cancellation until after their upcoming hundredth episode. Meanwhile, Kenneth Parcell (Jack McBrayer) suggests to Jenna Maroney (Jane Krakowski) that she'd make a great mother, which causes her to have a hysterical pregnancy in order to augment her career.

Tom the janitor (Michael Keaton) discovers a gas leak that is seeping into the ventilation system of TGS, necessitating the evacuation of all personnel and delaying production of the 100th episode. While repairing the gas leak, Tom inadvertently breaks the ventilation system on the 52nd floor, causing Jack to hallucinate a visit by an alternate reality version of himself. Alternate Jack declares that he fired Liz because she was holding him back and that without her, he had made his way to the top of GE. As a consequence, Jack meets with Liz and severs their relationship.

Liz is then approached by her ex-boyfriend, Dennis (Dean Winters), whom she had apparently called while under the influence of the gas, hoping to rekindle their relationship. Liz rejects Dennis, who subsequently realizes that he needs to sabotage the ventilation system in order to get her back.

Elsewhere, Tracy goes on multiple morning television shows in an attempt to sabotage the respect he has earned. Unfortunately, his attempts fail, as not only do the hosts interpret his crude behavior as artistic expression, but he also manages to save a man from drowning. Tracy discusses the problem with Jenna and the two realize the only way he could ruin his public image is to shoot someone. Tracy convinces Kenneth to volunteer as his shooting victim on the roof of the building.

As the gas spreads, Jack is visited by two more versions of himself. One is a past version who agrees with his original alternate version. The other is a future version who claims that he needs Liz to distract him from his blind ambition and that he will be much happier if he doesn't fire her. He warns Jack that Liz is about to sign a lease with Dennis, which will lead to them getting married and living in Jacksonville, Florida.

Jack finds Liz and prevents her from signing the lease. Meanwhile, Tom repairs the sabotaged gas line and Dennis is escorted out of the building. Liz then tells Jack that she saw Kenneth and Tracy heading for the roof with a gun. Jenna joins them and the group runs into Hank Hooper on the way, who pitches Jenna a daytime talk show, which causes her hysterical pregnancy to suddenly vanish in light of this new opportunity. They reach the roof just in time to prevent Tracy from shooting Kenneth. Jack advises Tracy that the best way to lose respect as an actor is to return to television, giving a speech alluding to events from Baldwin's own career.

Jack, Liz, Tracy, Jenna, and Kenneth make it back to the TGS set, where Liz discovers that the entire show was written under the influence of the gas and is essentially worthless. She breaks the gas line once again, and with Hooper and the entire studio audience affected by the gas, the show is a hit. A hallucinatory Hooper renews it for "a billion more episodes". Liz and Jack apologize to each other. They then toast to their friendship with imaginary champagne. Tom Hanks, upon seeing Tracy back on TV while watching the episode at home, calls George Clooney (who does not appear) on a red phone and tells him to have Tracy removed from the "official A-list".

== Reception ==
According to the Nielsen Media Research, this episode of 30 Rock was watched by 4.60 million households in its original American broadcast—with 4.80 million watching the first half-hour and 4.44 million watching the last half hour. It earned a 2.2 rating/6 share in the 18–49 demographic. This means that it was seen by 2.2 percent of all 18- to 49-year-olds, and 6 percent of all 18- to 49-year-olds watching television at the time of the broadcast.

"100" received positive reviews. The A.V. Club gave the episode a B− grade, praising the characterisation but criticising some of the more implausible plot elements (such as the gas leak and Jenna's sudden yearning for children).
