= 30 Rock season 5 =

30 Rock
- Season 5
- DVD cover
- Starring: Tina Fey; Tracy Morgan; Jane Krakowski; Jack McBrayer; Scott Adsit; Judah Friedlander; Alec Baldwin; Katrina Bowden; Keith Powell; Kevin Brown; Grizz Chapman; Maulik Pancholy; John Lutz
- No. of episodes: 23

Release
- Original network: NBC
- Original release: September 23, 2010 – May 5, 2011

Season chronology
- ← Previous; Season 4 Next → Season 6

The fifth season of 30 Rock, an American television comedy series on the NBC network in the United States, began airing on September 23, 2010. NBC announced on March 5, 2010, that 30 Rock would be returning for a fifth season in the 2010–2011 television season. Beginning with episode 11, 30 Rock was moved to the 10:00 PM timeslot, but, as a consolation, was renewed earlier than the other NBC sitcoms. During this time, Tracy Morgan underwent an emergency operation, causing his character to be written out for several episodes.

On July 31, 2010, NBC announced that an episode of 30 Rock's fifth season would be filmed and broadcast live, twice, on the evening of October 14, 2010. The two separate recordings resulted in a live telecast of the episode to American viewers in both the West and East Coast. The episode was a ratings success and was met with very positive reviews. The season also featured the show's 100th episode, which aired as a one-hour episode.

== Synopsis ==
Season 5 continues with Liz in a relationship with Carol (Matt Damon), a man she met in the episode "I Do Do", and Jack practicing to be and then being a father. Jack finally marries the woman he chose in "I Do Do", but an error in the wedding certificate leads to shocking results. Jack meets with Kabletown's boss, Hank Hooper (Ken Howard), who acts rather like Kenneth, and meets his competition in his granddaughter, Kaylee Hooper (Chloë Grace Moretz). Meanwhile, Tracy also becomes a father and finally gets an EGOT ("E" standing for "Emmy", "G" for "Grammy", "O" Oscar", and "T" for "Tony" ). However, the pressure of being an award-winning celebrity leads Tracy to nearly bring TGS to cancellation. With the help of Jenna, Kenneth tries to get back into the NBC Page Program. Tracy's wife, Angie, is given a reality show of her own, "Queen of Jordan", which was aired as an episode of 30 Rock. In the middle of the season, Jack and Avery's daughter is born, but a few episodes later, something happens in their relationship that separates them, possibly forever. Jenna continues her relationship with Paul. The Girlie Show with Tracy Jordan (TGS) celebrates its 100th episode.

== Cast ==
Tina Fey portrays Liz Lemon, the head writer of a fictitious live sketch-comedy television series TGS. The TGS cast consists of two main actors. The lead actor is the loose cannon movie star Tracy Jordan, portrayed by Tracy Morgan. His co-star is the extremely narcissistic Jenna Maroney, portrayed by Jane Krakowski. Jack "Danny" Baker (Cheyenne Jackson) is the newest TGS cast member. Jack McBrayer plays the naïve NBC page Kenneth Parcell. Scott Adsit acts as the witty and wise TGS producer, Pete Hornberger. Judah Friedlander portrays trucker hat-wearing staff writer Frank Rossitano. Alec Baldwin plays the NBC network executive Jack Donaghy. Donaghy's full corporate title for the majority of the season is "Head of East Coast Television and Microwave Oven Programming". Keith Powell plays the Harvard University alumnus and TGS staff writer James "Toofer" Spurlock. Katrina Bowden acts as writers' assistant Cerie Xerox. Other cast members include, Maulik Pancholy as Jonathan, Grizz Chapman as Grizz Griswold, Kevin Brown as "Dot Com" Slattery, and John Lutz as J.D. Lutz. The cast also features recurring guest stars Elizabeth Banks, who stars as Avery Jessup, Jack's wife, and Matt Damon as Carol, Liz's pilot boyfriend. Banks was prominently featured throughout the season. Condoleezza Rice appeared as a fictional version of herself, an old girlfriend of Jack Donaghy.

=== Main cast ===
- Tina Fey as Liz Lemon, the head writer of TGS, a live sketch comedy television show. (23 episodes)
- Tracy Morgan as Tracy Jordan, a loose cannon movie star and cast member of TGS. (21 episodes)
- Jane Krakowski as Jenna Maroney, a vain, fame-obsessed TGS cast member and Liz's best friend. (23 episodes)
- Jack McBrayer as Kenneth Parcell, a naïve, television-loving NBC page from Georgia. (23 episodes)
- Scott Adsit as Pete Hornberger, the witty and wise producer of TGS. (20 episodes)
- Judah Friedlander as Frank Rossitano, an immature staff writer for TGS. (18 episodes)
- Alec Baldwin as Jack Donaghy, a high-flying NBC network executive and Liz's mentor. (23 episodes)
- Katrina Bowden as Cerie Xerox, the young, attractive TGS general assistant. (9 episodes)
- Keith Powell as James "Toofer" Spurlock, a proud African-American staff writer for TGS. (14 episodes)
- Kevin Brown as Walter "Dot Com" Slattery, a member of Tracy's entourage. (13 episodes)
- Grizz Chapman as Warren "Grizz" Griswold, a member of Tracy's entourage. (13 episodes)
- Maulik Pancholy as Jonathan, Jack's assistant who is obsessed with him. (11 episodes)
- John Lutz as J.D. Lutz, a lazy, overweight TGS writer who is often ridiculed by his co-workers. (14 episodes)

=== Recurring cast ===
- Elizabeth Banks as Avery Jessup, Jack's fiancé and later wife. (6 episodes)
- Hannibal Buress as Hannibal, a homeless man. (6 episodes)
- Sue Galloway as Sue LaRoche-Van der Hout, a TGS writer from the Netherlands. (6 episodes)
- Chris Parnell as Dr. Leo Spaceman, a physician who practices questionable medical techniques. (6 episodes)
- Will Forte as Paul L'astnamé, Jenna's boyfriend who is also a Jenna Maroney impersonator. (5 episodes)
- Subhas Ramsaywack as Subhas, a janitor at 30 Rockefeller Plaza. (5 episodes)
- Ken Howard as Hank Hooper, the owner of Kabletown, the company that purchases NBC. (4 episodes)
- Cheyenne Jackson as Danny Baker, a TGS cast member. (4 episodes)
- Sherri Shepherd as Angie Jordan, Tracy's no-nonsense wife and reality television star. (4 episodes)
- Brian Williams as himself (4 episodes)
- Matt Damon as Carol Burnett, a pilot and Liz's boyfriend. (3 episodes)
- Rachel Dratch as various characters (3 episodes)
- Dean Winters as Dennis Duffy, Liz's immature ex-boyfriend. (3 episodes)

=== Guest stars ===
- Todd Buonopane as Jeffrey Weinerslaw, an employee in GE's human resources department. (2 episodes)
- Tituss Burgess as D'Fwan, Angie's hair stylist and cast member in her reality show. (2 episodes)
- Tom Hanks as himself (2 episodes)
- Lester Holt as himself (2 episodes)
- Michael Keaton as Tom, a maintenance man working at 30 Rockefeller Plaza. (2 episodes)
- Matt Lauer as himself (2 episodes)
- Adriane Lenox as Sherry, a nanny hired by Jack to look after his daughter. (2 episodes)
- Regis Philbin as himself (2 episodes)
- Rachael Ray as herself (2 episodes)
- Kelly Ripa as herself (2 episodes)
- Alan Alda as Milton Greene, Jack's biological father. (Episode: "Christmas Attack Zone")
- John Amos as the protagonist of the television show Let's Stay Together. (Episode: "Let's Stay Together")
- Will Arnett as Devon Banks, Jack's nemesis. (Episode: "Plan B")
- Ben Bailey as himself (Episode: "When It Rains, It Pours")
- Eion Bailey as Anders, a Swiss prostitute hired by Liz's friends to seduce her. (Episode: "It's Never Too Late For Now")
- Richard Belzer as Sergeant John Munch, a character from Law & Order: Special Victims Unit. (Episode: "¡Qué Sorpresa!")
- Reg E. Cathey as Rutherford Rice, the host of the fictional talk show Right On. (Episode: "Let's Stay Together")
- John Cho as Lorne, a Canadian meth smuggler. (Episode: "Double-Edged Sword")
- Margaret Cho as Kim Jong-Il, the North Korean dictator. (Episode: "Everything Sunny All the Time Always")
- Ann Curry as herself (Episode: "Gentleman's Intermission")
- Robert De Niro as himself (Episode: "Operation Righteous Cowboy Lightning")
- Victor Garber as Eugene Gremby, the chairman of the Wool Council. (Episode: "Respawn")
- Ina Garten as herself (Episode: "Respawn")
- Paul Giamatti as Ritchie, a television editor. (Episode: "When It Rains, It Pours")
- Kelsey Grammer as himself (Episode: "Reaganing")
- David Gregory as himself (Episode: "Brooklyn Without Limits")
- Bill Hader as Kevin, Carol's co-pilot. (Episode: "Live Show")
- Jon Hamm as Dr. Andrew "Drew" Baird, a pediatrician and Liz's former boyfriend. (Episode: "Live Show")
- Buck Henry as Dick Lemon, Liz's father. (Episode: "Gentleman's Intermission")
- Ice-T as Detective Odafin Tutuola, a character from Law & Order: Special Victims Unit. (Episode: "¡Qué Sorpresa!")
- Queen Latifah as Regina Bookman, a congresswoman who comes into conflict with Jack. (Episode: "Let's Stay Together")
- Julia Louis-Dreyfus as flashback Liz Lemon. (Episode: "Live Show")
- Cristin Milioti as Abby Flynn, a seductive female comedian. (Episode: "TGS Hates Women")
- Vanessa Minnillo as Carmen Chao, a journalist and Avery's rival. (Episode: "¡Qué Sorpresa!")
- Chloë Grace Moretz as Kaylie Hooper, Hank Hooper's cunning young granddaughter. (Episode: "TGS Hates Women")
- Paula Pell as Paula Hornberger, Pete's wife. (Episode: "The Fabian Strategy")
- Rob Reiner as a fictional version of himself in which he is a congressman. (Episode: "Let's Stay Together")
- Condoleezza Rice as herself (Episode: "Everything Sunny All the Time Always")
- Rob Riggle as Reggie, a TGS crew member who bullies Pete. (Episode: "I Heart Connecticut")
- Thomas Roberts as himself (Episode: "Everything Sunny All the Time Always")
- Philip Rosenthal as himself (Episode: "I Heart Connecticut")
- Susan Sarandon as Lynn Onkman, Frank's former teacher and lover. (Episode: "Queen of Jordan")
- John Slattery as Steve Austin, a congressional candidate from Rhode Island that Jack backs. (Episode: "Brooklyn Without Limits")
- Aaron Sorkin as himself (Episode: "Plan B")
- Elaine Stritch as Colleen Donaghy, Jack's cold and overbearing mother. (Episode: "Christmas Attack Zone")
- Daniel Sunjata as Chris, a member of the TGS crew. (Episode: "College")
- Meredith Viera as herself (Episode: "Gentleman's Intermission")

== Episodes ==
No. overall	No. in season	Title	Directed by	Written by	Original release date	Prod. code	U.S. viewers (millions)
81	1	"The Fabian Strategy"	Beth McCarthy-Miller	Tina Fey	September 23, 2010	501	5.91
Determined to help Liz stay in a relationship for once, Jack meddles in her relationship with Carol (Matt Damon). While at home, Jack struggles to compromise with Avery (Elizabeth Banks) as she redecorates his apartment. Tracy has trouble coming to grips with Kenneth getting fired and Jenna becomes one of the newest TGS producers.
82	2	"When It Rains, It Pours"	Don Scardino	Robert Carlock	September 30, 2010	502	5.68
Liz uses her newfound confidence of men noticing her to solve Pete's problem with a difficult television editor named Ritchie (Paul Giamatti). Meanwhile, Jack decides to teach his unborn child with his girlfriend Avery how to live. Elsewhere, Tracy is determined to be there when his wife Angie (Sherri Shepherd) gives birth, and a mysterious individual is making sure page duties at TGS at NBC are still getting done.
83	3	"Let's Stay Together"	John Riggi	Jack Burditt	October 7, 2010	503	4.90
Jack appears before Congress to discuss the NBC merger with KableTown. He hopes to win over the celebrity members, but one congresswoman (Queen Latifah) demands that there be more diversity in the programming lineup. So Jack enlists Tracy's help to come up with some new ideas for programming. Meanwhile, Liz is fed up with the grief her staff gives her, and Jenna helps Kenneth reapply for the NBC page program.
84	4	"Live Show"	Beth McCarthy-Miller	Robert Carlock & Tina Fey	October 14, 2010	504	6.70
Jack is on edge after promising to remain sober during Avery's pregnancy. Liz is upset that no one seems to remember it is her 40th birthday. Tracy is convinced that breaking character during a TGS taping will be hilarious while Jenna balks at the idea.
85	5	"Reaganing"	Todd Holland	Matt Hubbard	October 21, 2010	505	5.18
Jack is having a perfect day and succeeding at all of his tasks, so he decides to use his winning streak and help Liz figure out her relationship with Carol. Meanwhile, Jenna and Kenneth enlist actor Kelsey Grammer to help them pull off an ice cream scam, and Tracy tries to shoot a commercial for the Boys and Girls club.
86	6	"Gentleman's Intermission"	Don Scardino	John Riggi	November 4, 2010	506	5.31
Avery forces Jack to set some boundaries in his friendship with Liz. At the same time, Liz gets a surprise visit from her father Dick Lemon (Buck Henry). Meanwhile, Tracy asks Kenneth's help to remake his pre-produced video obituary, and when Jenna learns of this, she decides to make a video of her own.
87	7	"Brooklyn Without Limits"	Michael Engler	Ron Weiner	November 11, 2010	507	5.09
Jack tries to influence a congressional election in favor of a particular (albeit questionable) candidate (John Slattery) for the benefit of the network. Meanwhile, Liz has newfound confidence when Jenna helps her find the perfect pair of jeans. At the same time, Jenna helps Tracy plan a Golden Globe event.
88	8	"College"	Don Scardino	Josh Siegal & Dylan Morgan	November 18, 2010	508	5.11
Jack worries that GE's microwave sales have improved too much without his help and tries to find glitches in their newest design. Meanwhile, Liz partakes in a crew lottery despite Jenna and Tracy's warning her not to do so. Elsewhere, the TGS writers discover that Jack is the voice of an online dictionary's pronunciation guide.
89	9	"Chain Reaction of Mental Anguish"	Ken Whittingham	Kay Cannon	December 2, 2010	509	5.03
After Jack suggests that she go and see a therapist, Liz starts talking to Kenneth about her relationship with Carol. Meanwhile, Tracy tries to get Jack to invest in his son's theme restaurant in Times Square and Jenna and Paul celebrate their half year anniversary.
90	10	"Christmas Attack Zone"	John Riggi	Tracey Wigfield	December 9, 2010	510	4.76
Liz and Avery try to convince Jack to reveal secrets to his visiting mother at Christmas time. Liz also tries to fix Jenna's relationship with Paul, and Tracy tries to stop the release of his new film before it ruins his new serious persona.
91	11	"Mrs. Donaghy"	Tricia Brock	Jack Burditt	January 20, 2011	511	5.34
The "TGS" staff is affected by budget cuts at NBC. Liz's New Year's resolution could mean more trouble for Jack's wedding. Jenna shares a dressing room with Danny. Tracy has a health scare.
92	12	"Operation Righteous Cowboy Lightning"	Beth McCarthy-Miller	Robert Carlock	January 27, 2011	512	4.92
Liz tries to exploit the situation when crew members from Angie's TV show (Queen of Jordan) follow Tracy for the day. Jack pre-tapes a disaster telethon, but his efforts have unexpected results when a storm ravages the island of Mago.
93	13	"¡Qué Sorpresa!"	John Riggi	Matt Hubbard	February 3, 2011	513	4.78
Liz helps Avery against her work competition by pretending to be pregnant. Jack works to impress the new boss, even going as far as to steal one of Kenneth's ideas. Meanwhile, the new boss sends Tracy and Jenna some gifts and they start to fight when they realize that they were only sent one Kabletown sweater and they both want it.
94	14	"Double-Edged Sword"	Don Scardino	Kay Cannon & Tom Ceraulo	February 10, 2011	514	4.59
Jack and Avery try to delay labor on a romantic vacation, while Liz and Carol get stuck on the runway on the way to their own getaway. Meanwhile, Tracy finally earns an EGOT but is besieged by all the responsibility that comes with it.
95	15	"It's Never Too Late for Now"	John Riggi	Vali Chandrasekaran	February 17, 2011	515	4.07
To help Liz after her breakup with Carol, Jenna, Jack and the "TGS" staff members, come up with a plan to show Liz that she can still find love again, through having a one night stand. Meanwhile, Jack has trouble negotiating with his nanny due to sleepless nights as a new father and Pete and Frank decide to start a band.
96	16	"TGS Hates Women"	Beth McCarthy-Miller	Ron Weiner	February 24, 2011	516	4.50
Liz hires a new female writer who turns out to be an embarrassing female stereotype; Jack works to position himself in KableTown's line of succession.
97	17	"Queen of Jordan"	Ken Whittingham	Tracey Wigfield	March 17, 2011	517	4.19
Jack appoints Liz in charge of an event for Angie in the hopes that Liz can manipulate Angie into manipulating Tracy. Meanwhile, the Queen of Jordan cameras embarrass Jack and completely ignore Jenna, and Frank finds a lost love. Susan Sarandon guest stars.
98	18	"Plan B"	Jeff Richmond	Josh Siegal & Dylan Morgan	March 24, 2011	518	4.36
The staff searches for work when the show goes on hiatus and Jack attempts to salvage a disastrous network acquisition. Aaron Sorkin and Will Arnett guest star.
99	19	"I Heart Connecticut"	Stephen Lee Davis	Vali Chandrasekaran & Jon Haller	April 14, 2011	519	4.45
Liz and Kenneth try to find Tracy's whereabouts before "TGS" can be cancelled. Meanwhile Pete, feeling emasculated, challenges the writers and crew to a contest of strength. Philip Rosenthal and Rob Riggle guest star.
100	20	"100"	Don Scardino	Jack Burditt & Robert Carlock & Tina Fey	April 21, 2011	520	4.60
101	21	"100"	Don Scardino	Jack Burditt & Robert Carlock & Tina Fey	April 21, 2011	521	4.60
Jack convinces management to give "TGS"'s cancellation an eleventh hour reprieve to prove their worth with the 100th episode; Jenna considers becoming a mother. Guest stars include Dean Winters, Michael Keaton, and Tom Hanks.
102	22	"Everything Sunny All the Time Always"	John Riggi	Kay Cannon & Matt Hubbard	April 28, 2011	522	3.95
Liz realizes that she needs to take control of her personal life by fixing up her dream apartment, but she encounters an obstacle along the way. Meanwhile, Jack has his own problems to deal with when Avery is held hostage. Elsewhere, Tracy finds out that Kenneth, Dotcom and Grizz have bonded in his absence. Guest stars Margaret Cho and Condoleezza Rice as herself.
103	23	"Respawn"	Don Scardino	Hannibal Buress & Ron Weiner	May 5, 2011	523	4.20
Tracy interrupts Liz's summer vacation. Meanwhile Jack feels lonely and turns to Kenneth, while Jenna must choose between being the Wool Council spokeswoman and her relationship with Paul.

== Reception ==
=== Critical reception ===
On Rotten Tomatoes, the season has an approval rating of 86% with an average score of 7.6 out of 10 based on 21 reviews. The website's critical consensus reads, "Liz Lemon continues to fire off tart zingers in a resilient fifth season that maintains 30 Rock's streak of innovative – if somewhat inconsistent – gags, pulled off with tremendous heart." The fifth season earned positive reviews from critics, a number of whom noted that it had staged a "comeback" after what they had considered a disappointing fourth season. Writing for HitFix, reviewer Alan Sepinwall noted his disappointment in the fourth season and opined that the fifth had "rebounded", commenting "there have been weeks [...] where 30 Rock made me laugh longer, louder and more frequently than not only every other NBC sitcom, but every comedy on TV". Sepinwall cited a tighter focus on its main characters, a happier Liz Lemon, smarter use of guest stars and a general improvement in quality as the reasons why the series had demonstrated such a turnaround. Nathan Rabin of The A.V. Club expressed similar sentiments in regard to the fourth season, noting "the growing pains hit hard [...] the show devolved into self-parody". However he considered that "30 Rock found its footing in its fifth season [...] it has at least aged into a show that no longer feels such a desperate need to impress. For all its busyness, it feels a little more comfortable in its own skin". He also described the series as having "experienced a hell of a comeback" during its fifth season.

Francis Rizzo of DVD Talk was also positive about the season, commenting that "the joy of 30 Rock is the way it manages to keep surprising after years of following the same, relatively unchanging characters, thanks to writing that's frequently ridiculous and hilarious, and a cast that makes even the most over-the-top situation feel real, and thus even funnier".

=== Ratings ===
The fifth-season premiere, "The Fabian Strategy", drew 5.9 million viewers, an increase from the previous episode, "I Do Do" (5.5 million), but a decrease on the fourth season premiere, "Season 4", which had drawn an audience of 6.4 million. The fourth episode of the season, "Live Show", aired live and demonstrated a turnaround, attracting a season high of 6.7 million viewers. This figure was the highest overall for NBC in the 8:30 p.m. Thursday timeslot for non-sports events since December 2009. Following NBC's decision to move 30 Rock to the later time of 10:00 p.m. for the second half of the season, ratings declined to beneath five million viewers per week, starting with the episode "Operation Righteous Cowboy Lightning". The penultimate episode of the season, "Everything Sunny All the Time Always" became the new lowest-rated episode of the series, with less than four million viewers tuned in. Previously, the fourth-season episode "Lee Marvin vs. Derek Jeter" had been the lowest-rated, with four million. The season finale, "Respawn", attracted 4.2 million viewers, and overall, the season averaged 5.3 million viewers, ranking one hundred and sixth for the year, according to Nielsen Media Research.

30 Rock season five was found to have added an average of 30 percent more viewers in the 18–49 demographic, when DVR plus seven day viewers were factored in. This is a measurement of the viewers who recorded the series and viewed it within seven days of broadcast. In all, the season added 1.4 million (28 percent) more total viewers when seven day results were factored in.

=== Awards and nominations ===
30 Rock season five received nine nominations at the 63rd Primetime Emmy Awards, including Outstanding Lead Actress in a Comedy Series for Fey, Outstanding Lead Actor in a Comedy Series for Baldwin, Outstanding Supporting Actress in a Comedy Series for Krakowski, Outstanding Guest Actress in a Comedy Series for Elizabeth Banks, Outstanding Guest Actor in a Comedy Series for both Matt Damon and Will Arnett, Writing, Directing, and the series' fifth consecutive nomination for Outstanding Comedy Series, although it did not win in any of these categories.

== Production ==
=== Timeslot ===
During the fall of 2010, the show aired at 8:30 p.m., after Community and before The Office on Thursdays. On November 15, 2010, it was announced 30 Rock would move to 10:00 p.m., following Parks and Recreation starting January 20, 2011 (the show's sixth season renewal was also announced along with this information). Episode 22 - "Everything Sunny All the Time Always" aired at the special time of Thursday at 10:30-11:00 (ET/PT), due to extended episodes of The Office and Parks and Recreation.
