= I Do Do =

- 30 Rock episode
- Episode no.: Season 4 Episode 22
- Directed by: Don Scardino
- Written by: Tina Fey
- Production code: 422
- Original air date: May 20, 2010

Guest appearances
- Elizabeth Banks as Avery Jessup; Craig Castaldo as Moonvest; Matt Damon as Carol; Will Forte as Paul; Susan Heyward as Feyoncé; Kristin McGee as Kaitlin; Julianne Moore as Nancy Donovan; Paula Pell as Paula Hornberger; Michael Sheen as Wesley Snipes; Jason Sudeikis as Floyd DeBarber

Episode chronology
← Previous "Emanuelle Goes to Dinosaur Land"	Next → "The Fabian Strategy"
- 30 Rock season 4

"I Do Do" is the twenty-second episode and season finale of the fourth season of the American television comedy series 30 Rock, and the 80th overall episode of the series. It was directed by series producer Don Scardino, and written by series creator, executive producer and lead actress Tina Fey. The episode originally aired on NBC in the United States on May 20, 2010. Guest stars in this episode include Elizabeth Banks, Craig Castaldo, Matt Damon, Will Forte, Susan Heyward, Kristin McGee, Julianne Moore, Paula Pell, Michael Sheen, and Jason Sudeikis.

In the episode, Liz Lemon (Fey) meets the man of her dreams (Damon). Meanwhile, Jack Donaghy's (Alec Baldwin) love triangle with Avery Jessup (Banks) and Nancy Donovan (Moore) comes to a head. At the same time, NBC page Kenneth Parcell (Jack McBrayer) tries to avoid a promotion that would send him to Los Angeles, and Jenna Maroney's (Jane Krakowski) new relationship may be ruined after her boyfriend (Forte) falls for another woman.

"I Do Do" was generally, though not universally, well received among television critics. According to the Nielsen Media Research, this episode was watched by 5.5 million households during its original broadcast, and received a 2.8 rating/8 share among viewers in the 18–49 demographic. "I Do Do" received two Primetime Emmy Award nominations for Outstanding Directing for a Comedy Series and Outstanding Costumes for a Series.

== Plot ==
The episode starts where the previous one ended, at Kaitlin (Kristin McGee) and Floyd DeBarber's (Jason Sudeikis) wedding. Liz Lemon (Tina Fey), who is scheduled to do a reading at the ceremony, wastes time so that her boss, Jack Donaghy (Alec Baldwin), after sending her a text message to stall for time, can talk things over with Nancy Donovan (Julianne Moore). He has admitted to Nancy that he is in love with both her and Avery Jessup (Elizabeth Banks), but she cannot cope with what Jack has told her. The two talk the situation over, and Jack eventually tells Nancy that he cares for her and decides he wants to be with her.

After Floyd's wedding, Liz goes to the office of her fiancé, Wesley Snipes (Michael Sheen), to retrieve his shoes for Cerie Xerox's (Katrina Bowden) wedding. At Wesley's office, she meets an airline pilot named Carol (Matt Damon). When she learns that Carol is a big fan of The Girlie Show with Tracy Jordan (TGS), for which Liz is the head writer, she asks Carol to go with her to Cerie's wedding, which he accepts. At Cerie's wedding, Wesley is distraught that Liz ended their engagement through a text message she sent to him. Liz tells him that fate brought them together so that she would meet Carol, with whom she can see herself spending the rest of her life. Wesley is devastated and leaves. Unbeknownst to Liz, Carol, who Liz thought had stepped out from the party area, heard everything she told Wesley, which shocks Carol, prompting him to leave. At the same time, at Cerie's wedding, Nancy learns that Avery is pregnant after having a conversation with her in the ladies room, and tells Jack before she leaves him. When Jack finds Avery, he tells her he wants to marry her, which she accepts.

Meanwhile, NBC page Kenneth Parcell (Jack McBrayer) is notified by TGS producer Pete Hornberger (Scott Adsit) that he has received a promotion as "junior-in-charge-boy of the entire NBC page program" but that he will have to move out to Los Angeles, which does not sit well with Kenneth. Kenneth tells Tracy Jordan (Tracy Morgan) about this, but Tracy advises him to do a lousy job so that he loses the promotion. While giving a tour around the 30 Rock building, Kenneth does a terrible job, and as a result of his behavior, Pete is forced to dismiss him. At the same time, Jenna Maroney (Jane Krakowski) is shocked to see her boyfriend and Jenna impersonator, Paul (Will Forte), dressed as singer Cher. At Feyoncé (Susan Heyward) and Grizz Griswold's (Grizz Chapman) wedding, which is being held at the TGS set, Jenna is not amused that Paul showed up dressed as Cher, but is surprised that Paul is dressed as her on his left side and Cher on his right, and as a result, the two make-up. Later, at Grizz's wedding, Jack tells Liz that Carol is looking for her. Carol tells Liz that he would like to give her a chance so that the two can have a relationship. At the same time, Kenneth, who is drunk, gets on stage, and gives a ranting speech to his former co-workers, at first appearing as if he is going to insult them all, but ultimately telling them that he loves them all and hopes that they get everything they want in life.

== Production ==
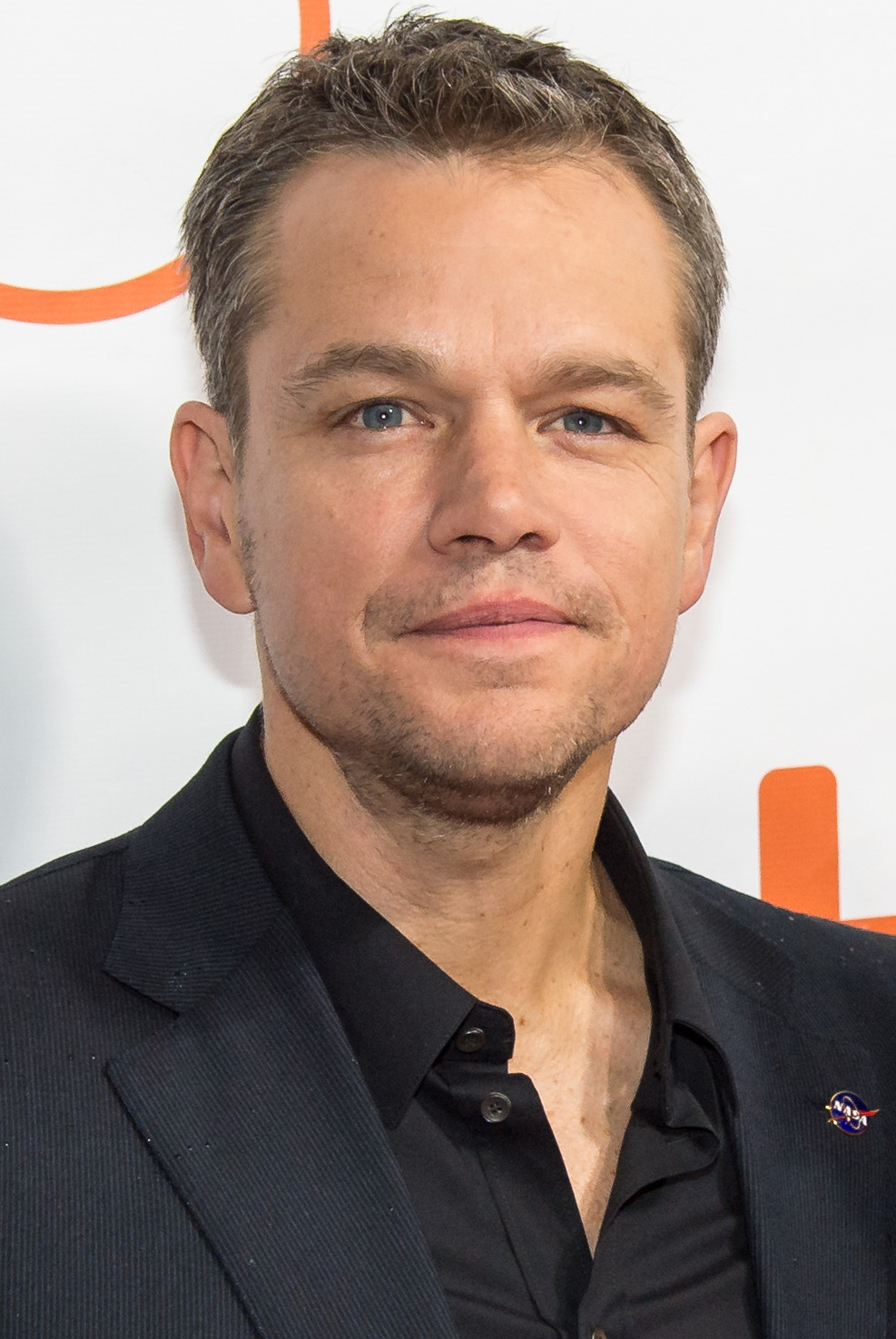
Matt Damon guest starred in the season finale episode of 30 Rock.

"I Do Do" was written by series creator, executive producer and lead actress Tina Fey, and directed by series producer Don Scardino. This was Fey's twenty-first writing credit, and Scardino's twenty-seventh directed episode. "I Do Do" originally aired on NBC in the United States on May 21, 2010, as the twenty-second episode and season finale of the show's fourth season and the 80th overall episode of the series. This episode of 30 Rock was filmed on March 16, April 7, and April 8, 2010. Saint Cecilia's Catholic Church in Greenpoint, Brooklyn served as the church for Floyd and Kaitlin's wedding.

In March 2010, it was confirmed that actor Matt Damon would guest star on 30 Rock, and in this season finale episode, he played Carol, an airline pilot and love interest for Fey's character, Liz Lemon. In December 2009, Entertainment Weekly informed Damon that he was at the top of Fey's guest star wish list for the show. When told about this, Damon, a fan of the show, responded "I would do [30 Rock] in a heartbeat if they asked me to come on. She should call my people – or even better me. Or I could call her. Let's make this happen." Damon had worked with Alec Baldwin in the 2006 feature films The Departed and The Good Shepherd. Damon's role on the show made it his second prime-time television appearance following his guest spot on Will & Grace—a series that previously aired on NBC—in 2002. When asked if he would return as Carol in the show's fifth season, Damon said "If they'll have me, I would love to pop in and see the gang again. I had a great time doing it."

In "I Do Do", actors Elizabeth Banks, Will Forte, Julianne Moore, Michael Sheen, and Jason Sudeikis reprised their roles as Avery Jessup, Paul, Nancy Donovan, Wesley Snipes, and Floyd DeBarber, respectively. This episode concluded Jack's love triangle arc with Avery and Nancy, which first began in "Lee Marvin vs. Derek Jeter", after it was revealed that Avery was pregnant with Jack's child, and Jack ultimately choosing Avery. Show producer and writer Paula Pell made an appearance on the episode as Paula Horneberger, the wife of Pete Horneberger, played by Scott Adsit. In one scene of this episode, Jack sees Avery and tells her he wants to be with her, though, music is played in the background as Jack talks to Avery. Jack then asks that the music be turned down, which is shut off by a man. The man was credited as "Moonvest" and was played by Craig Castaldo, or known as Radio Man. Castaldo has made numerous appearances on the show.

The cake shown briefly in Grizz Griswold's wedding was designed by bakers from Food Network's reality television show Ace of Cakes. There was an entire episode of Ace of Cakes devoted to designing this cake and the cake for the season four wrap party.

== Cultural references ==
The episode opens with Liz at Kaitlin and Floyd's wedding, and she plays Mash with the Bible. "So I'm going to marry ... Yafet. And we're going to live in ... Nineveh. And I'm going to be a ... prostitute." Afterwards, Liz rewords the lyrics to "The Wedding Song (There Is Love)" by folk-singing trio Peter, Paul and Mary. Nancy tells Jack that she cannot share him with another woman. She says, "I can't share you with another woman like you're that Mormon guy on HBO who was in that tornado movie with that blond woman who was married to that Jewish guy." Her statement is a reference to actor Bill Paxton who appeared in the 1996 movie Twister, and starred in the HBO show Big Love, a series about a fundamentalist Mormon family in Utah who practice polygamy. The "blonde woman" and "Jewish guy" Nancy is referring to are actors Helen Hunt and Paul Reiser in their sitcom Mad About You.

Jenna is shocked that Paul is dressing up as singer Cher. She tells him that she expected fidelity from him, as he is a Jenna impersonator, and says "Fidelity, Paul. It's not just the name of a bank that sued me." Fidelity Investments is one of the largest mutual fund groups in the world. Later, Nancy recognizes Avery from an Overshoppe.com commercial. In a flashback, Avery repeatedly pronounces the letter "O" with a Maryland accent. The commercial is a parody to Overstock.com's commercials, an online seller of surplus merchandise. During her speech, Liz cites her foot problem, meaning she has never let anyone see her feet, which is a real life trait of Fey's. After Liz's speech, Wesley tells her that losing him is her loss and "There's only one Wesley Snipes in this world", though, Liz says "You know there isn't", a reference to the other Wesley Snipes, an American actor.

== Reception ==
According to the Nielsen Media Research, "I Do Do" was watched by 5.5 million households in its original American broadcast. The rating was a 12 percent increase in viewership from the previous week's episode, "Emanuelle Goes to Dinosaur Land", which was seen by 4.996 million American viewers. The show claimed a 2.8 rating/8 share among viewers aged 18 to 49, meaning that 2.8 percent of all people in that group, and 8 percent of all people from that group watching television at the time, watched the episode. Don Scardino received a Primetime Emmy Award nomination for Outstanding Directing for a Comedy Series for his work in "I Do Do" at the 62nd Primetime Emmy Awards, but lost it to Ryan Murphy. In addition, Tom Broecker, Remy Pearce, and Joanna Brett, costume designers on the show, received a nomination for Outstanding Costumes for a Series for this episode at the same awards show, however, they lost the award to Joan Bergin and Susan Cave of The Tudors.

Bob Sassone of AOL's TV Squad said that he was not certain if "this was a great 30 Rock episode" but that it "had all of the elements that make the good ones: funny one-liners and Liz and Jack both looking for something better in their lives." He was complimentary towards Matt Damon's appearance, writing that he "was one of the best things about this season finale episode", but admitted he could not see Damon "being Liz's boyfriend or husband next season." The A.V. Club's Nathan Rabin wrote that he enjoyed Kenneth's rant against his former co-workers, and said that this episode "was a terrific end to a season that wobbled for a while but ended strongly." Sean Gandert of Paste magazine said that Kenneth's story was "an enjoyable diversion". In regard to the finale, itself, Gandert noted that it was "pretty good, but not outstanding, which is a fitting way to conclude a season that never quite hit its stride but was still consistently entertaining." Entertainment Weekly contributor Emily Exton noted that Damon's character was a "perfect match" for Liz. Meredith Blake, writing for the Los Angeles Times, wrote that Damon was "perfectly Damon-esque". Blake reported that she had been rooting for the Avery character since first appearing in the series, but acknowledged "that there's something undeniably sweet about Jack and Nancy." IGN contributor Robert Canning complimented Julianne Moore's performance, writing that she was "engaging". Canning said that Kenneth and Jenna's plots "added more hilarity to the episode" and that on their own "these storylines [were] very entertaining. But combine them into one fantastic, fast and funny half hour and you're left with near perfection." Alexandra Martell of New York magazine said that Avery's pregnancy was "going to drive much of next season, but if that means more Elizabeth Banks, we're cool." Martell wrote that Kenneth getting fired was a "nice twist", but that "the highlight" of "I Do Do" was Jenna discovering Paul dressing up as Cher. TV Guide's Adam Mersel opined that the "biggest twist in the series' history" was Nancy revealing that Avery was pregnant.

Not all reviews were positive. Television columnist Alan Sepinwall for HitFix wrote that the finale had "funny throwaway lines and moments" but that overall "it was another largely flat episode, and one that leaned too heavily on the guest stars." Callie Carmichael of CNN was less positive, writing that "I Do Do" fell "a bit flat", and concluded "As a rule of thumb, sitcoms usually fall short when you take the characters out of their element, and this one definitely did with three weddings in three separate places." Eleanor Barkhorn from The Atlantic had issues with the plot twists, citing that they would not "bode well for the future of the series." She explained that Jack and Avery having a child was "problematic", observing that it puts a "relatively definite end" to the sexual tension between Liz and Jack that occurred in the show's first season. In addition, Barkhorn noted that Damon's character was a "great match" for Tina Fey's Liz, but believed that the relationship between the two would not last.
