= I Heart Connecticut =

- 30 Rock episode
- Episode no.: Season 5 Episode 19
- Directed by: Stephen Lee Davis
- Written by: Vali Chandrasekaran; Jon Haller
- Production code: 519
- Original air date: April 14, 2011

Guest appearances
- Rob Riggle as Reggie; Phil Rosenthal as himself; Steve Cirbus as Slaughterface; Seth Kirschner as Shawn

Episode chronology
← Previous "Plan B"	Next → "100"
- 30 Rock season 5

"I Heart Connecticut" is the nineteenth episode of the fifth season of the American television comedy series 30 Rock, and the 99th overall episode of the series. It was directed by Stephen Lee Davis, and written by Vali Chandrasekaran and Jon Haller. The episode originally aired on NBC in the United States on April 14, 2011. Guest stars in this episode include Rob Riggle, Phil Rosenthal, Steve Cirbus, and Seth Kirschner.

In the episode, Liz Lemon (Tina Fey) and Kenneth Parcell (Jack McBrayer) go on a quest to find Tracy Jordan (Tracy Morgan) now that they know he is not in Africa. Meanwhile, Jenna Maroney (Jane Krakowski) is set to star in a torture porn movie called Take My Hand, but after several issues with the budget, Jack Donaghy tries to make sure that the movie is profitable by doing almost anything, including adding Wal-Mart and Phil Rosenthal as sponsors. At TGS, Pete Hornberger (Scott Adsit) unexpectedly becomes an arm wrestling champion amongst the crew.

== Plot ==
With the revelation that Tracy Jordan (Tracy Morgan) is still in New York City somewhere, Liz Lemon (Tina Fey) and Kenneth Parcell (Jack McBrayer) conduct a search to find him before upper management can cancel TGS in his absence. Their search leads them to a warehouse that Tracy appears to have been hiding out in until recently. Meanwhile, Jenna Maroney is set to star in a torture porn movie called Take My Hand, which Jack Donaghy (Alec Baldwin) recognizes as a failed NBC production from a number of years ago. With the budget threatening to overrun, Jack is determined to make the film profitable in some way.

In the writers room, Pete Hornberger (Scott Adsit) argues with Frank Rossitano (Judah Friedlander) over where they should order their lunch from, which results in the pair having an arm wrestling match that Pete wins. His victory earns him newfound respect amongst the TGS crew, but brings him into a confrontation with an unpleasant member of staff named Reggie (Rob Riggle), whom he challenges to a match. However, Pete and Reggie unexpectedly end up bonding, as they discuss their respective families. The pair learn that they both have experienced their kids thinking they're losers. Reggie has invited his family to watch the arm wrestling match, so Pete decides to let him win so that his son can feel proud of his father. Ultimately, everything turns out to have been a fabrication within Pete's mind and he reawakens to find himself losing the original match with Frank.

Finally, Jack's quest to make Take My Hand profitable leads him to enlist Wal-Mart as a sponsor and rope in Everybody Loves Raymond producer Phil Rosenthal, before ultimately modifying the film to suit a family audience. Liz decides to stage another webcam conversation between Kenneth and Tracy, hoping that the latter will in some way give up his location. Despite Kenneth largely giving the ploy away, Liz recognizes where he is hiding — the unused upstairs level of her apartment that she had acquired from her upstairs neighbor ("Sun Tea"). The pair finally apprehend Tracy and convince him to destroy his good reputation so he can return to TGS.

== Reception ==
According to the Nielsen Media Research, this episode of 30 Rock was watched by 4.45 million households in its original American broadcast. It earned a 2.2 rating/6 share in the 18–49 demographic. This means that it was seen by 2.2 percent of all 18- to 49-year-olds, and 6 percent of all 18- to 49-year-olds watching television at the time of the broadcast.
