= Walk and talk =

Storytelling technique

Walk and talk is a storytelling technique used in filmmaking and television production in which a number of characters have a conversation while walking somewhere. Walk and talk often involves a walking character who is then joined by another character. On their way to their destinations, the two talk. Variations include interruptions from other characters and walk and talk "relay races," in which new characters join the group and one of the original characters leaves the conversation, while the remaining characters continue the walking and talking.

== Purpose ==
The technique is frequently used as a means of emphasizing how busy the characters are. It suggests that there is so much to do and so little time to do it in that even traveling time must be used to serve additional functions. It also serves the purposes of smoothing transitions from one location to another and adding visual interest to what might otherwise be static "talking heads" sequences. The main Law & Order series in the U.S. have used the technique to this purpose occasionally, and the CSI franchise has used it frequently. It has been used as a prominent story-enhancer in numerous episodes of The West Wing, The Bill, House, Ugly Betty, ER and Grey's Anatomy.

The Walk and Talk technique is also often used as a way of combining exposition with a visual introduction to major areas (and their locations in relation to one another) that will be used in a production. Examples of this can be seen in both film (the opening conversation between Mal and Simon in Serenity) and television (the similar conversation between Sinclair and Lyta in the pilot episode of Babylon 5, "The Gathering"). This use of the technique is regularly seen in opening scenes in the UK series Hollyoaks as a way of recapping current story lines and showing how the plot streams interrelate with the characters.

== Use ==
An early use of the technique is in the British police procedural The Bill, and it was used widely on St. Elsewhere but it was arguably popularized by ER, which used the technique to get doctors from place to place.

Director Thomas Schlamme also favored the technique in Sports Night when working with writer Aaron Sorkin. Schlamme adapted it from the typical wide-angle shot of the time to a closer tight-angle shot, usually encompassing only the subjects' upper torsos. Subsequently, Schlamme used this technique heavily in Sorkin's NBC show The West Wing, and it remains a favorite of Sorkin, who continued its use in his show, Studio 60 on the Sunset Strip.

In both shows, Sorkin has at times referenced his own use of the technique in character dialogue. One example of this can be found in the West Wing first-season episode "Five Votes Down", where Josh and Sam talk while meandering around the office before Sam asks, "Where are you going?" each man then claims to have been following the other. This is repeated in the episode "Mandatory Minimums" when Sam and Toby are walking to breakfast and pass the restaurant by an entire block because they were "having a nice conversation".

Sorkin later parodied the technique during a guest stint on 30 Rock in the season 5 episode "Plan B". Sorkin and show star Tina Fey are each waiting their turn for a meeting, when they engage in conversation. Sorkin suggests they "walk and talk", and they end up meandering through the hallways of the office building for about a minute before they end up back where they started.

In Late Night with Seth Meyers, the "Sorkin Sketch" parodies Sorkin's signature writing including walk and talk, where Meyers and an employee converse about the subject while walking down the hallway.

In the direct-to-video Family Guy movie Stewie Griffin: The Untold Story, a cutaway gag depicts Chris guest-starring on The West Wing and engaging in a "walk and talk" scenario. The camera eventually pulls back to reveal that Chris is actually inside a giant maze like those associated with lab mice, and he becomes excited at finding a piece of cheese.

== See also ==
- Steadicam
- Tracking shot
