= Acquisition of NBC Universal by Comcast =

Business transaction held from 2009 to 2013

- The logo of Comcast from late 2006 to 2013

- NBCUniversal logo as of January 31, 2011

- Alternate NBCUniversal logo, created after the company's takeover and featuring Comcast's updated NBC peacock logo to promote its ownership
- Initiator: Comcast
- Target: NBC Universal from GE
- Type: Majority stake (until March 2013); Full acquisition (from March 2013)
- Cost: US$13.75 billion
- Initiated: December 3, 2009; 16 years ago
- Completed: January 28, 2011; 15 years ago (majority); March 19, 2013; 13 years ago (full ownership)
- Resulting entity: NBCUniversal

On December 3, 2009, telecommunications company Comcast announced its intent to acquire mass media company NBC Universal from General Electric (GE). The acquisition was subject to scrutiny from activists and government officials; their concerns primarily surrounded the potential effects of the vertical integration that the acquisition could create, as Comcast is also heavily involved in cable television and internet services in many media markets. The deal went through on January 28, 2011, resulting in Comcast owning 51% of the company until March 19, 2013, when GE divested its stake to give Comcast sole ownership. Through this acquisition, Comcast gained ownership of the National Broadcasting Company (NBC), the film studio Universal Pictures, cable channel (Bravo), and Universal Parks & Resorts, among other assets owned by NBC Universal. It has also integrated its own cable channels – including Versus – into NBC Universal. As a result of the acquisition, NBC Universal slightly changed its name to "NBCUniversal", rendered in camel case, to indicate the integration between NBC and Universal Studios.

== History ==
=== Background ===
Evolution of Comcast
- 1909: Independent Moving Pictures was founded by Carl Laemmle as the predecessor to Universal
- 1912: Universal Studios Hollywood was founded after Independent Moving merged with several smaller film studios
- 1915: Universal City, California, was established as the entertainment district for the Universal Studios Lot.
- 1924: MCA Inc. was founded by Jules Stein as a talent agency to book musicians
- 1926: RCA Corporation launched the NBC Radio Network, and by 1939, NBC began broadcasting on television.
- 1934: Decca Records America was established and would later grow to become Universal Music Group
- 1946: William Goetz and Leo Spitz began managing Universal Pictures, after merging International Pictures
- 1952: Decca Records America acquired a controlling stake in Universal Pictures
- 1958: MCA acquired the Universal Studios film lot and later purchased Decca Records America, and Universal Pictures in 1962
- 1963: Comcast was founded as American Cable Systems by Ralph J. Roberts
- 1973: Decca Records America is retired as a brand and renamed to MCA Records
- 1986: General Electric acquired RCA Corp and dissolved the company while retaining ownership of NBC
- 1990: Panasonic acquired a Controlling interest in MCA, but sold it to Seagram within five years after growing costs
- 1998: MCA Records acquired Polygram N.V. from Philips and was renamed to Universal Music Group
- 2000: Seagram Entertainment was sold to Vivendi and merged with StudioCanal to become Vivendi Universal
- 2002: NBC acquired Telemundo while Comcast acquired AT&T Broadband
- 2004: Vivendi Universal was consolidated with General Electric's wholly owned NBC to form NBCUniversal, while Universal Music Group was separated
- 2013: Comcast closed its acquisition of NBCUniversal from General Electric
- 2018: Sky Group was acquired from 21st Century Fox after a bidding war
- 2020: Peacock was launched
- 2026: Majority of NBCU's cable networks were spun off into another company named Versant, while Comcast later announced it would spin-off NBCUniversal and Sky into a separate company

Comcast was, at the time, the largest cable television provider in the United States. It also owned a number of major cable networks, including E!, Golf Channel, and Versus. In 2004, Comcast attempted a hostile takeover of The Walt Disney Company for $41 billion, which would have made Comcast the world's largest media conglomerate, if approved. The deal fell through, however; Comcast's motivation for the deal was centered around gaining control of ESPN, which a Comcast executive described as "the most important and valuable asset" in Disney's portfolio. The same year, General Electric (GE) acquired an 80% stake in Universal Studios from Vivendi, merging it into NBC to form NBC Universal. By 2009, NBC Universal's financial performance had struggled due in part to the poor performance of recent Universal Studios' productions, and NBC ranked fourth at the time among the major broadcast television networks in the United States. By contrast, some of NBC Universal's cable networks (such as MSNBC, Syfy, and USA Network) were reporting steady gains in viewership. After the failed Disney deal, Comcast focused on its existing networks (along with its Comcast SportsNet regional sports networks), and acquired a stake in the film studio Metro-Goldwyn-Mayer (MGM).

=== Proposal ===
Negotiations between Comcast and NBC Universal for a potential acquisition began as early as March 2009; News Corporation and Time Warner were also reportedly interested in purchasing NBC Universal. By September 2009, Comcast had negotiated a purchase of a stake in NBC Universal from GE, but the overall deal was held up by negotiations with Vivendi for the sale of its 20% stake to GE. On December 3, 2009, Comcast and NBC Universal confirmed a $6.5 billion deal to merge the two companies, pending approval from the United States Department of Justice Antitrust Division; the deal would be structured as sale of Vivendi's stake in the company to GE for $5.8 billion, followed by Comcast acquiring a 51% controlling stake of NBC Universal, and contributing its existing media properties to the company, themselves valued at $7.25 billion. As a result, NBC Universal would become a joint venture between Comcast and GE, with Comcast holding a 51% majority stake. As a whole, the deal valued NBC Universal at $30 billion. The deal included an option for General Electric to sell further stakes in the company to Comcast over seven years, or for Comcast to buy stakes at "specified times". Jeff Zucker was to remain CEO of NBC Universal after the acquisition, and remain headquartered in New York, but would report to Comcast.

Comcast CEO Brian L. Roberts described the deal as a "perfect fit" for the company, as Comcast would be able to bolster its role as a creator and distributor of content, with a particular emphasis on "[the] multiplatform ‘anytime, anywhere’ media that American consumers are demanding"; increasing access to NBC-owned content through various platforms. The deal would also add Comcast's cable channels to NBCU's existing suite of cable networks, contributing to 82% of the merged company's total revenue. Despite the focus on cable, Comcast promised to remain committed to over-the-air broadcasting and promised an increased amount of local news, children's programming, and Spanish language programming across various platforms, including over-the-air. GE's CEO Jeffrey R. Immelt justified the deal, citing a desire to move purely back into the industrial sector, and was also motivated by the Great Recession.

The deal was subject to the approval of the Federal Communications Commission (FCC); due to the magnitude of the agreement, it was placed under heavy scrutiny by the commission, which held hearings on the deal and its effects on the public's access to media.

=== Opposition ===
The acquisition was opposed by several media activists, particularly those who were against vertical integration. Free Press argued that Comcast would use the deal to stifle competition in online video by restricting where NBC-owned content can be offered, and charging higher rates to television providers for accessing NBC-owned networks, having to pass these charges on to consumers. There were concerns from the owners of NBC's affiliates, who urged the FCC to require that Comcast maintain NBC programming on over-the-air television, and not move it exclusively to cable. Several competing internet service and television providers urged the FCC to place conditions on Comcast if the deal were to be approved, including requiring that Comcast adhere to the principles of net neutrality, offer wholesale access to its broadband services, and place limits on how Comcast can leverage its NBC-owned stations in retransmission consent negotiations to inhibit competition. AOL proposed that the FCC enforce its program access rules for Comcast's online video content as well, requiring the provider to offer it to competitors at a fair rate. By June 22, 2010, over 32,000 comments about the deal had been sent to the FCC.

=== Approval and closure of acquisition ===
On January 18, 2011, the FCC and the United States Department of Justice (DOJ) approved the acquisition. Four months later, Meredith Attwell Baker, the FCC commissioner who approved the deal, was hired as a lobbyist by Comcast. Upon the completion of the acquisition, which took place on January 28, NBC Universal was slightly renamed to "NBCUniversal", with the change intended to reflect "unity" between NBC and Universal Studios. Comcast and GE formed the joint venture holding company NBCUniversal, LLC on the same day. NBC Universal, Inc. became a wholly owned subsidiary of the holding company and was renamed NBCUniversal Media, LLC on January 29.

Comcast agreed to offer an internet service plan for qualifying low-income families for at least three years as part of the acquisition. The plan, "Internet Essentials", initially offered a 1.5-megabit connection for $9.95 per month (increased to 5 megabits in 2013) with no activation or equipment fees, as well as an opportunity to purchase a discounted netbook and receive free "internet training". Of an estimated 2.60 million households eligible for the program, about 0.22 million households participated in the program as of June 2013. Comcast stated that the program would accept new customers for the duration of the mandate. In March 2014, as he met with FCC concerning a proposal to acquire Time Warner Cable, Comcast vice president David Cohen told reporters that the Internet Essentials program would be extended indefinitely.

Comcast intended to buy out the rest of GE's stake in NBCUniversal over the following seven years. Ownership remained split at 51%–49% for two years, and later, on February 12, 2013, Comcast announced its intention to complete the purchase all at once and assume 100% ownership of the company by the end of March. The deal was officially completed on March 19.

== Scale of new company ==
The merger expanded Comcast's scale significantly; Comcast's position as a cable television provider produced vertical integration with its ownership of NBC Universal's broadcast television and cable networks, while Comcast's existing cable networks (which consisted of E!, Style Network, PBS Kids Sprout, G4, Golf Channel, and Versus) and regional sports networks were horizontally integrated with the television properties of NBC Universal. Mark Leccese of The Boston Globe noted that the combined company consisted of "10 TV and movie production studios (including Universal Pictures), 20 cable channels, 11 regional broadcast TV stations, 15 Telemundo stations, 9 regional sports cable networks, one regional news cable station (New England Cable News), a whole bunch of websites, two pro sports teams in Philadelphia and two arenas, a food service vendor, a ticket agency, and four theme parks. And some other stuff."

== Influence ==
The video marketplace has changed structurally with or without the Comcast-NBCUniversal acquisition. More and more videos, programs, and advertisements are displayed on the Internet, not the traditional media channel, television. As a result, the video business model has gradually changed as time goes by. Comcast has reached such a significant scale that it now owns many media and entertainment properties. However, facing the uncertainty of the video marketplace, many people proposed their concerns:

=== Impact on the video market ===
One of the claims is "Comcast would be able to use its vertically integrated position to deny rival distributors access to programming or to raise the cost of that programming". Comcast-NBC will face two rival distributors – the satellite and telephone company and the new entrant. Of course, both of them worry about the domination that Comcast-NBCUniversal may be capable of establishing and the entry barrier. The big challenge for the satellite and telephone company is to find a new business model to convince the programmers that their model will benefit them more than Comcast-NBCUniversal. However, Comcast-NBCUniversal also keeps improving its business model, which is unhappy to the new entrant.

The other claim is that "Comcast will use the merger to change NBC into a cable network, at the expense of local programming". Some observers predict that Comcast may convert NBC to a cable network. They think that Comcast must have to make some changes because NBC broadcast station traditionally has only one revenue path, the advertising;

=== Impact on competition, diversity, and localism of media company ===
The three major topics are media ownership, competition, diversity, and localism. Once two or more media companies amalgamated, such as in the case of the merger of News Corp/DirecTV and SiriusXM, many critics suggested that a merged company with too much power will harm the competition, diversity of the media marketplace and even the democracy of this country. Some of them directly called it "merger to monopoly". FCC Commissioner Copps once said, "It will create a single company with enormous influence over politics, art, and culture across the nation and especially in the New York metropolitan area." Localism may also be affected by this merger. The new entity that acts as a gatekeeper could limit the local or independent voices to get to the slots on the media distribution system. Adam Thierer has conveyed this concern, "The new entity will have the incentive to prioritize NBC shows over other local and independent voices and programs, making it even harder to find alternatives on the cable dial."

=== Benefits to shareholders and consumers ===
One of the claims is, "A combined Comcast-NBC Universal might have the unique ability to craft new business models that benefit consumers." With new digital technologies to distribute videos, advertising revenues have yet to be generated in the new market. Therefore, these enterprise operators must find a new business model to make the revenues financially available. Facing the uncertain environment, Comcast Senior Vice President for Corporate Development, Robert Pick, still shows his determination. He says, "the combination would ameliorate the negotiations friction that had made it difficult for Comcast, primarily a distribution and communications company, to convince content owners and programmers to work with us to create and deliver more content to consumers in a greater variety of ways."

=== Impact on price of video markets ===
Many observers, such as journalist Adam Thierer, predict that the price of distributing videos were going to fall dramatically in the near future because three distribution products of Comcast (broadcasting, television, and internet) are all merging into the network. Wall Street Journal business columnist Holman Jenkins said that "customers want the product for free. Comcast's lifeblood, the $100-a-month cable bill and the $50-a-month broadband bill, increasingly look like duplicative expenses. And so on." In order to recover the lost revenue from content, Comcast-NBCUniversal may enhance their business on service of advertising, subscription etc.

== On-air effects ==
The first major on-air effects of the deal occurred in February 2011, when Comcast began to align its sports properties with the NBC Sports division; the Comcast Sports Group was renamed NBC Sports Group, with Mark Lazarus, formerly the head of Turner Entertainment Group, heading its cable networks. NBC Sports talent could now appear on Comcast networks such as Golf Channel; NBC's golf coverage was re-branded as Golf Channel on NBC beginning at the 2011 WGC-Accenture Match Play Championship. On August 1, 2011, Comcast announced that its Versus network would be renamed NBC Sports Network on January 2, 2012, to directly align it with NBC Sports.

The NBC sitcom 30 Rock (which depicts a fictionalized version of the network) referenced the merger via a recurring storyline in its fourth season, which saw the Philadelphia-based cable company Kabletown similarly acquire the in-universe NBC from GE; the January 27, 2011 episode "Operation Righteous Cowboy Lightning", which aired the day Comcast's Steve Burke met his new NBC employees, opens with a scene depicting a Kabletown sign being installed on 30 Rockefeller Center to replace the existing neon GE sign,. The subsequent episode "¡Qué Sorpresa!" introduced Kabletown's CEO Hank Hooper (Ken Howard) as an equivalent to Comcast's Ralph J. Roberts.

In 2014, Comcast received approval by the city of New York to perform a similar modification to the actual 30 Rock, replacing the GE lettering with signs depicting its corporate logo and the NBC peacock.

== See also ==
- Merger of AOL and Time Warner (2001)
- Acquisition of Time Warner by AT&T (2018)
- Acquisition of 21st Century Fox by Disney (2019), a corporate act of The Walt Disney Company which acquired the majority of 21st Century Fox assets, mostly film, television studios and entertainment pay television channels.
- 2019 merger of CBS and Viacom (2019), a media merger deal that combined the operations of CBS Corporation and Viacom, which had previously split in 2006, into a new company called ViacomCBS (now Paramount Skydance).
- Merger of Discovery, Inc. and WarnerMedia (2022)
- Merger of Skydance Media and Paramount Global (2025)
- Acquisition of Warner Bros. Discovery by Paramount Skydance (2026), a media acquired and merger Paramount Skydance and Warner Bros. Discovery into a new company called Skydance Corporation.
- Concentration of media ownership
