= Namalata =

Village and island in Fiji

- Village
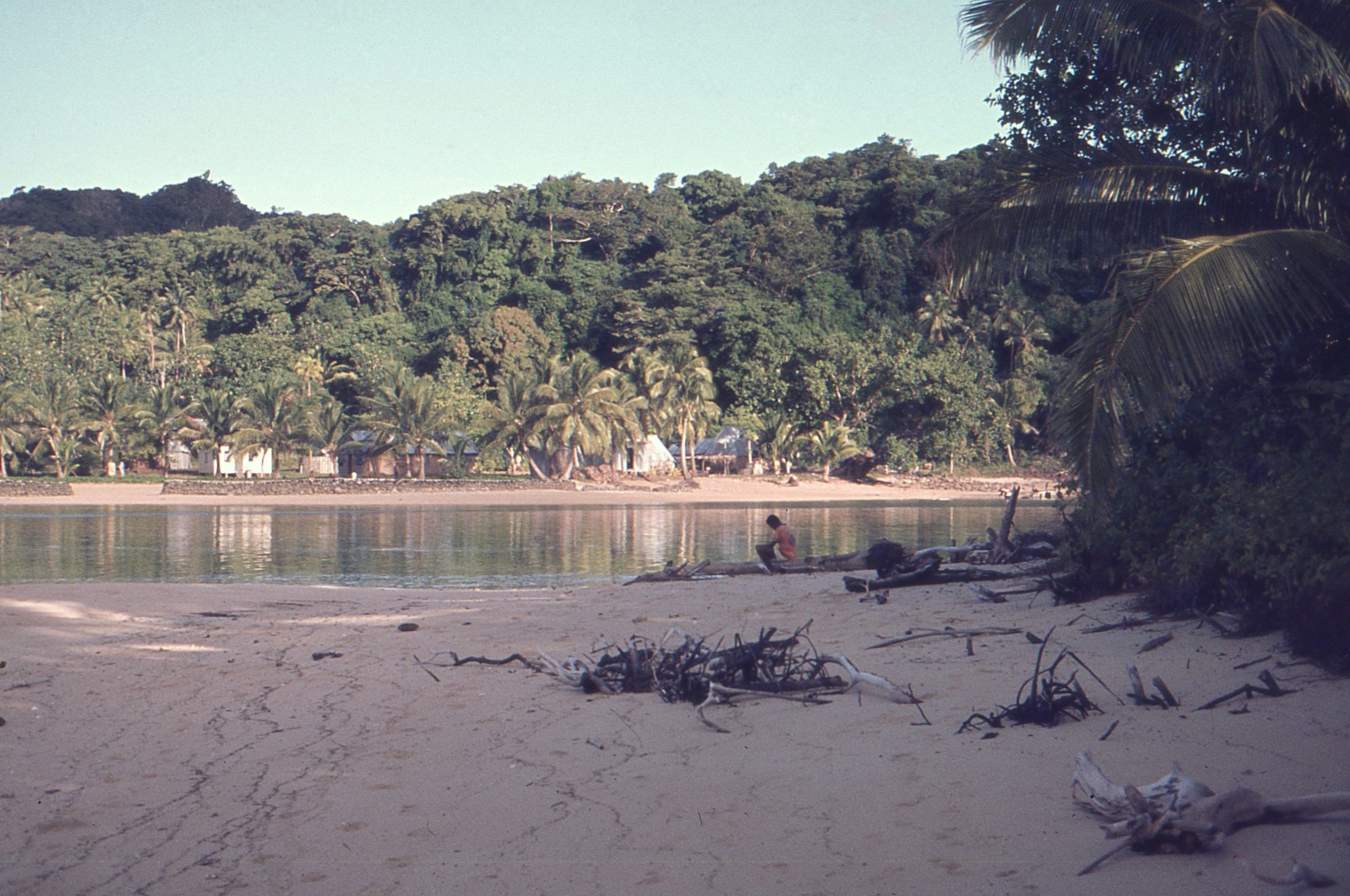
- Namalata Village

- Vanua Balavu

- Location in Fiji
- Country: Fiji
- Division: Eastern Division
- Province: Lau
- Island: Vanua Balavu
- Archipelago: Lau Islands
- Time zone: UTC+12

Namalata (Fijian pronunciation: [namalata]) is a village and island in Fiji. It is located in the southern portion of the Vanua Balavu island group, part of Fiji's Lau Islands. The village is a constituent of the larger Lomaloma village.

The people of Namalata descend from the original inhabitants of Mago Island, who were displaced in the nineteenth century.

== Chiefly titles ==
The Chief of Namalata Village is the Tui Mago.

== From Mago to Namalata ==
In the mid-19th century, Fiji's two dominant chiefs at the time, the Vunivalu of Bau (Seru Epenisa Cakobau) and the Tui Cakau were threatened by the Tongan warlord, Enele Ma'afu. They sought the help of the Namalata people while Ma'afu was in Lomaloma, on Vanua Balavu, as they could provide information on his movements.

The island of Mago was then given to Europeans in order to slow Ma'afu's advancement into Fiji, as the threat of retaliation from their respective homelands deterred him from attacking Europeans. When Fiji was ceded to the United Kingdom in 1874, those occupying the island were registered as the rightful owners, thus dispossessing the Namalata people. Mago Island is now owned by actor and film director Mel Gibson.
