= Mago Island =

Fijian Island

Coordinates: 17°27′S 179°09′W

Mago
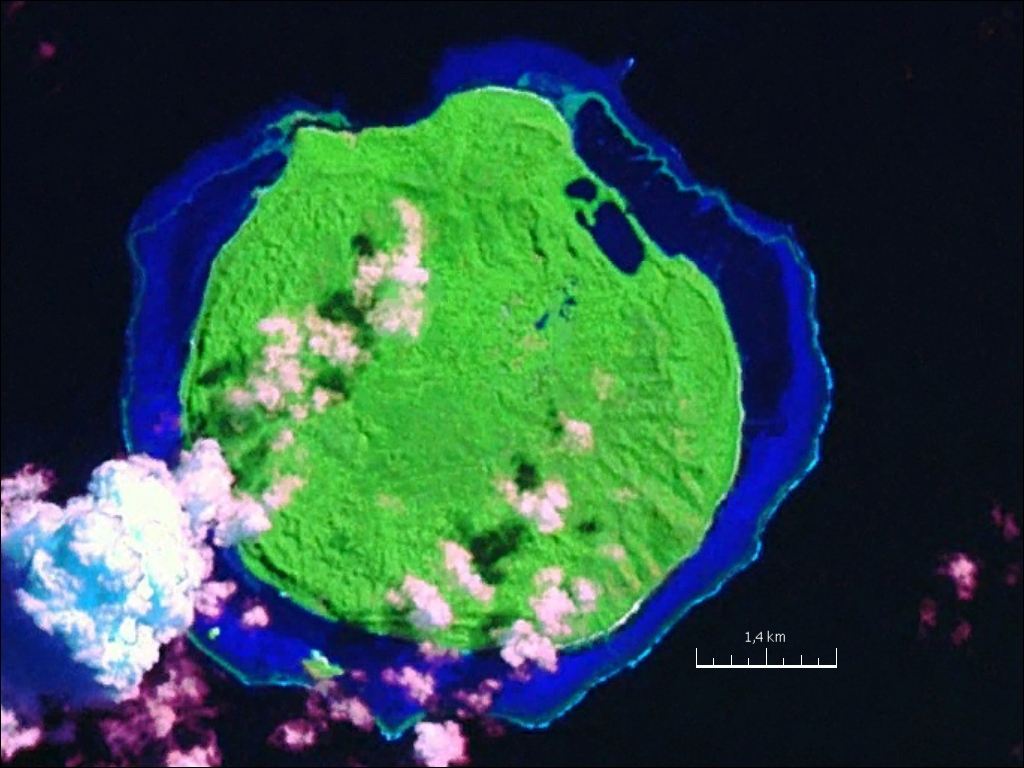
- NASA Geocover 2000 satellite image

- Location within Fiji

Geography
- Location: South Pacific Ocean
- Archipelago: Lau Islands
- Adjacent to: Koro Sea
- Area: 22 km^{2} (8.5 sq mi)

Administration
- Fiji
- Division: Eastern Division
- Province: Lau
- District: Lau Other Islands

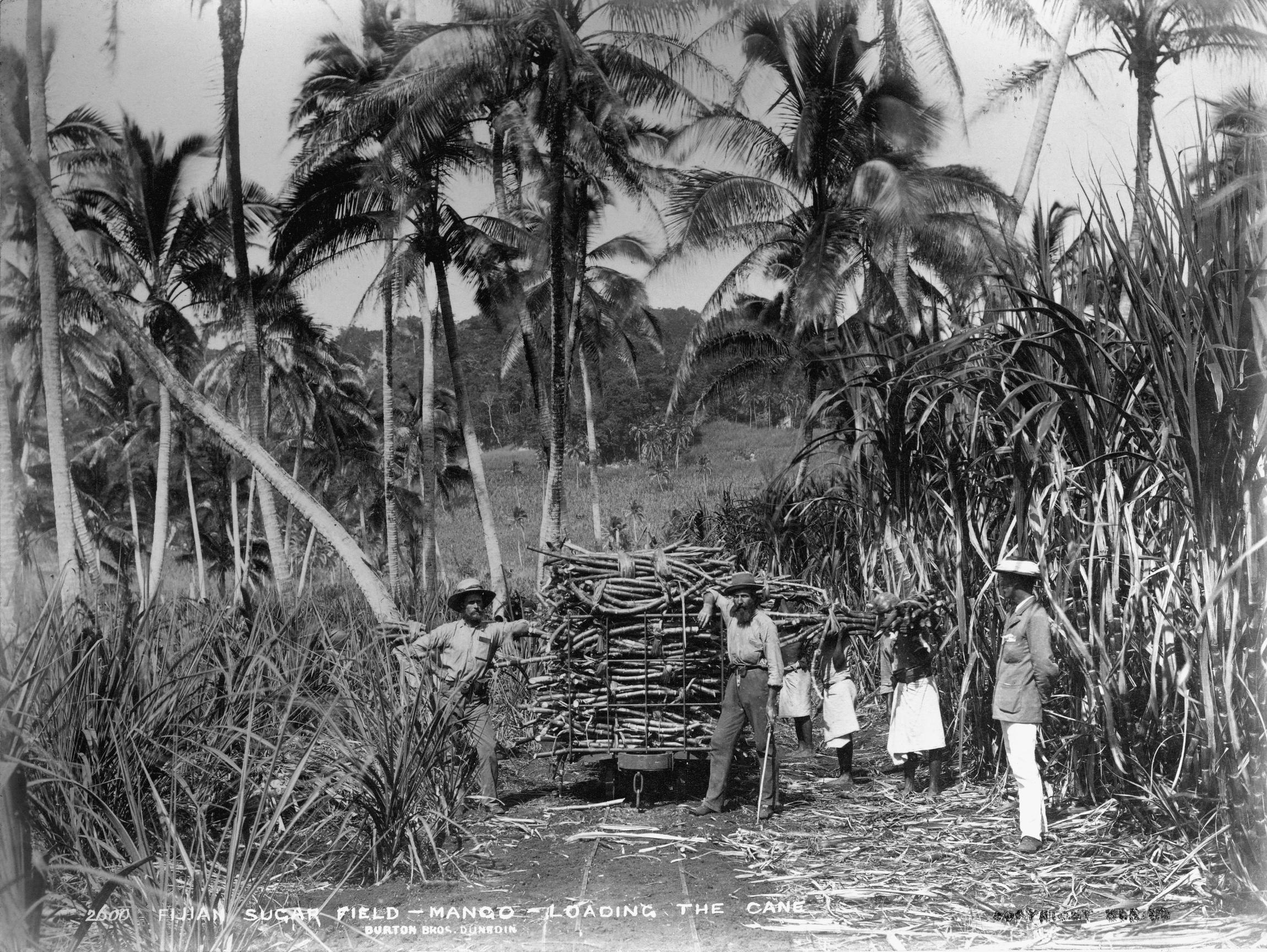
View of men loading sugar cane in the fields of Mago in 1884.

Mago Island (pronounced [ˈmaŋo]) is a volcanic island that lies in the northwest sector of Fiji's northern Lau Group of islands. One of the largest private islands in the southwestern Pacific Ocean, the island has an area of 22 square kilometres (8.5 sq mi). The island is privately owned by actor and director Mel Gibson.

Mago is located 166 miles (267 km) east-northeast of the Fiji capital of Suva and 14 miles (23 km) southwest of the tiny island of Namalata, near Vanua Balavu, where descendants of original Mago inhabitants still reside. Mago Island is relatively undeveloped at present and inhabited only by a few caretakers of Indo-Fijian descent.

== History ==
During the 1860s, a cotton plantation established by the Ryder brothers of Australia flourished there. In 1884 there was a well-established sugar cane plantation plus a sugar mill on the island. The Mill was shut down in 1895 and it was dismantled and used to enlarge the Penang Mill in Ra. The Ryders were succeeded by the Borron family.

In early 2005 Mago Island was purchased by Hollywood actor/director Mel Gibson for $15 million from Japan's Tokyu Corporation. Descendants of original native inhabitants of Mago, who were displaced in the 1860s, have protested against Gibson's purchase.

Satellite images of the island dating from 2008 show a dirt airstrip of 1,100 metres (3,600 ft). There is no port on the island; a short stone pier is located on the island's north side. There is only one loosely arranged village on the island whose appearance is more indicative of a resort. Agriculture consists of only a few small areas of fields.

An episode of the NBC sitcom 30 Rock titled "Operation Righteous Cowboy Lightning" (Season 5, Episode 12) featured a story about a disaster on the island. Jack Donaghy, played by Alec Baldwin, decides to air a pre-recorded telethon to benefit the victims of the disaster. However, Donaghy is shocked to learn the only "victims" of the disaster are Mel Gibson and his guest, Jon Gosselin.
