= Christmas Attack Zone =

- 30 Rock episode
- Episode no.: Season 5 Episode 10
- Directed by: John Riggi
- Written by: Tracey Wigfield
- Production code: 510
- Original air date: December 9, 2010

Guest appearances
- Alan Alda as Milton Greene; Elizabeth Banks as Avery Jessup; Will Forte as Paul L'Astname; Elaine Stritch as Colleen Donaghy

Episode chronology
← Previous "Chain Reaction of Mental Anguish"	Next → "Mrs. Donaghy"
- 30 Rock season 5

"Christmas Attack Zone" is the tenth episode of the fifth season of the American television comedy series 30 Rock, and the 90th overall episode of the series. It was written by show story editor Tracey Wigfield and directed by co-executive producer John Riggi. It originally aired on NBC in the United States on December 9, 2010. Guest stars in this episode include Alan Alda, Elizabeth Banks, Will Forte, and Elaine Stritch.

In the episode, Liz Lemon (Tina Fey) and Avery Jessup (Banks) convince Jack Donaghy (Alec Baldwin) to confide in and grow closer to his visiting mother Colleen Donaghy (Stritch) at Christmas time. At the same time, actor Tracy Jordan (Tracy Morgan) tries to stop the release of his new film before it ruins his new serious persona, and Liz also tries to fix Jenna Maroney's (Jane Krakowski) relationship with her former boyfriend Paul L'Astname (Forte).

This episode of 30 Rock received generally positive reviews from television critics. According to Nielsen Media Research, "Christmas Attack Zone" was watched by 4.759 million households during its original broadcast, and received a 2.9 rating/5 share among viewers in the 18–49 demographic.

On June 22, 2020, it was revealed that this would be one of three episodes being pulled from syndication due to a scene in which Jenna wears blackface.

== Plot ==
Liz Lemon (Tina Fey) is invited by her boss Jack Donaghy (Alec Baldwin) to spend Christmas with him to help him deal with a visit from his mother, Colleen Donaghy (Elaine Stritch). Liz finds it strange that Jack's fiancée Avery Jessup (Elizabeth Banks) will not spend the holiday with him and immediately realizes that Jack has not told his mother about Avery's pregnancy. Avery becomes angry, but she and Liz convince him to tell her, which he promises to do. Jack tells Colleen about the news but she is not excited about the pregnancy as Jack and Avery are not married. To get back at her, Jack calls his biological father Milton Greene (Alan Alda), the father she never told him he had, and invites him to spend Christmas with him, and does not inform him that Colleen will be present. The next day, Milton arrives and Jack explains the reason for his visit is so that he can ambush Colleen as she looks down on his relationship with Avery. Later, Avery arrives and is angered about what Colleen said about her relationship with Jack. Liz tries to warn Colleen about Jack's plan but to no avail. She is shocked to see Milton, but immediately figures out what Jack is up to. Colleen gets even with Jack by faking a heart attack, which causes Milton and Avery to feel sorry for her, thus abandoning their plan to reprimand Colleen. At the hospital, Avery reveals that she and Jack had planned to elope over New Year's and extends an invitation to everyone. After the announcement, Liz leaves and travels to White Haven, Pennsylvania to spend Christmas with her family.

Meanwhile, actor Tracy Jordan (Tracy Morgan) is nominated for a Golden Globe Award for his role in the drama feature Hard To Watch, but realizes that in order to win the award, he needs to act as a serious actor. As a result, Tracy buys the rights to his new comedy movie, The Chunks 2: A Very Chunky Christmas, in order to block the distribution of the feature and improve his chances at winning the award. Later, Tracy decides to do a charity event by screening Hard To Watch—a story of an inner-city boy living in the ghetto—for a women's shelter. At the charity event, Tracy introduces the movie but decides against showing it, realizing that laughter is the best medicine and instead screens The Chunks 2: A Very Chunky Christmas. The people in the shelter find the movie hilarious, thus making Tracy happy.

At the same time, Jenna Maroney (Jane Krakowski) is having a hard time dealing with her break-up with Paul L'Astname (Will Forte). Liz, seeing Jenna miserable, visits Paul and tells her that Jenna misses him. Paul visits Jenna, though not to resume their relationship, instead to tell her that he has come up with a brilliant costume for the New Queer's Eve party in which guests dress up as a pop culture phenomenon from the previous year. Unbeknownst to Paul, Jenna also has the same costume idea as his and as a result, the two get back together. At the party, Paul dresses like actress Natalie Portman's character in the 2010 movie Black Swan and Jenna dresses up as former Pittsburgh Steelers wide receiver Lynn Swann.

== Production ==
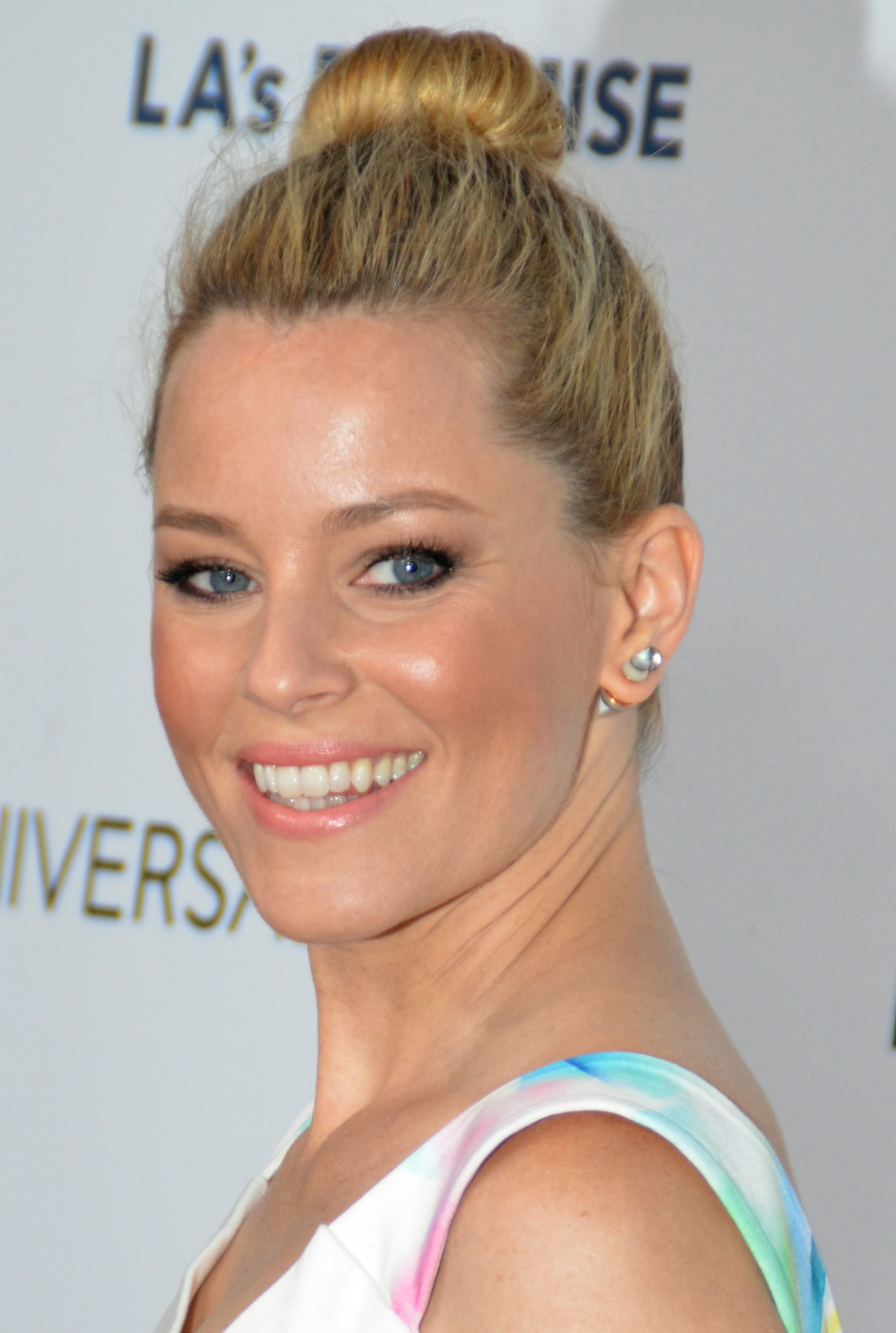
Elizabeth Banks guest starred in "Christmas Attack Zone" as the character Avery Jessup.

"Christmas Attack Zone" was written by 30 Rock story editor Tracey Wigfield, her first episode for the fifth season, and her fourth writing credit overall after "Jackie Jormp-Jomp", "Future Husband", and "Don Geiss, America and Hope". This episode was directed by co-executive producer and staff writer John Riggi, making it his fifth for the series after directing "Goodbye, My Friend", "The Problem Solvers", "The Moms", and "Let's Stay Together". This episode of 30 Rock originally aired in the United States on December 9, 2010, on NBC as the tenth episode of the show's fifth season and the 90th overall episode of the series.

Co-showrunner and executive producer Robert Carlock revealed to Entertainment Weekly that "Christmas Attack Zone" was "the big [episode] for us. It's the long-awaited reunion of Jack's biological parents. A couple of years ago, Jack discovered his real father, but just to avoid an argument, he hasn't told his mother that he knows her shameful sex secret." The character Professor Milton Greene, Jack Donaghy's biological father, was played by guest actor Alan Alda, best known for his role as Hawkeye Pierce from the television series M*A*S*H. Alda and Alec Baldwin have worked together, having appeared in the 2004 biographical drama film The Aviator. This was Alda's third appearance on the show. After the airing of the season three finale episode "Kidney Now!', in which Jack organizes a benefit concert to get Milton a kidney, it was unknown whether or not the benefit concert for Milton was a success, however, in the season four episode "Into the Crevasse", Milton is shown to have written his book From Peanut to President, a biography of United States President Jimmy Carter. In this episode it is revealed that Jack sent Milton a kidney from British singer-songwriter Elvis Costello who participated in the benefit concert in "Kidney Now!". In October 2010, it was confirmed that Alda would return as his 30 Rock character on the fifth season. In an interview with TV Guide, Alda said that he first met Elaine Stritch twenty years ago "but never worked with her before. I always knew the reunion would be interesting. We kid with each other a lot, and our characters have a common enemy in their son." This was Elaine Stritch's seventh appearance as Colleen Donaghy, Jack's mother, on the series. She guest starred in the episodes "Hiatus", "Ludachristmas", "Christmas Special", "Señor Macho Solo", "The Natural Order", and "The Moms".

Avery Jessup, fiancée of Baldwin's character, was played by actress Elizabeth Banks, who first guest starred as the character in the show's fourth season. This was Banks' tenth time as the Avery character. Banks told Michael Ausiello of Entertainment Weekly that she approached the 30 Rock staff about making an appearance as she is a fan of the show. "I definitely put feelers out, like, 'I would love to be on your show.' And they did it. They made it happen! I'm a huge fan, so this is a dream come true." Banks also revealed that she has no intention on becoming a series regular, explaining that she has been having "too much fun" making films to commit to a television show full-time. Comedian actor Will Forte made his fourth appearance in the show, having guest starred as a different character in the February 1, 2007, episode "Black Tie" from the show's first season. In the previous season, Forte played Jenna Maroney's boyfriend and Jenna impersonator. Forte has appeared in the main cast of Saturday Night Live (SNL), a weekly sketch comedy series which airs on NBC in the United States. Tina Fey, the series creator and lead actress on 30 Rock, was the head writer on SNL from 1999 until 2006. In June 2010, Jane Krakowski, who plays Jenna, confirmed that Forte would reprise his role as her boyfriend in the upcoming season. Carlock also noted in the Entertainment Weekly interview that the Jenna and Paul characters "have some ups and downs. He wants to try to be a normal couple, and she is afraid of that level of commitment." In the previous episode, "Chain Reaction of Mental Anguish", Jenna and Paul break-up. In "Christmas Attack Zone", the two get back together.

== Cultural references ==
Liz says that she watches the CBS police procedural television series The Mentalist and that she has become a body language expert, in which she figures out that Jack has not told Colleen about Avery's pregnancy, similar to the show's series protagonist played by actor Simon Baker. Some reviewers have noted that Tracy's movie The Chunks 2: A Very Chunky Christmas is a parody to the movies Nutty Professor II: The Klumps (2000), Norbit (2007), and the comedic fictional character Madea. Later, Tracy says "As an actor, it is my job to tell the truth, hold the mirror to humanity, and sell Proactiv", this is a reference to Proactiv Solution, an over-the-counter topical treatment for mild to moderate forms of acne and the fact that the product has many celebrity spokespeople. At the New Queer's Eve, in which guests dress up as a pop culture phenomenon from the previous year, Paul dresses as actress Natalie Portman's character in the 2010 psychological thriller Black Swan, and Jenna dresses up as former Pittsburgh Steelers wide receiver Lynn Swann. Their rendition of "O Holy Night" with which the episode concludes is an homage to Episode 4:11 of The West Wing, "O Holy Night."

== Reception ==
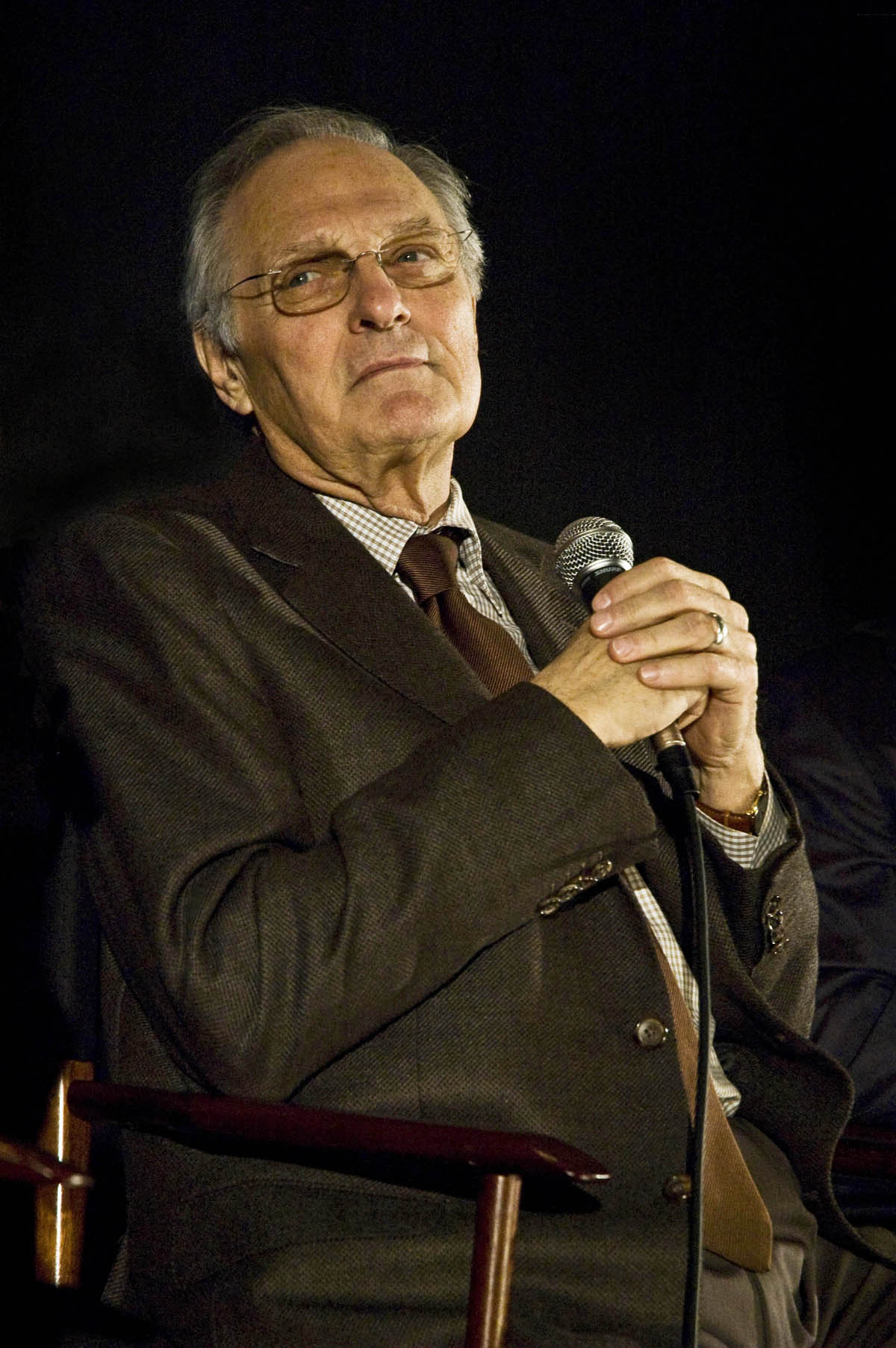
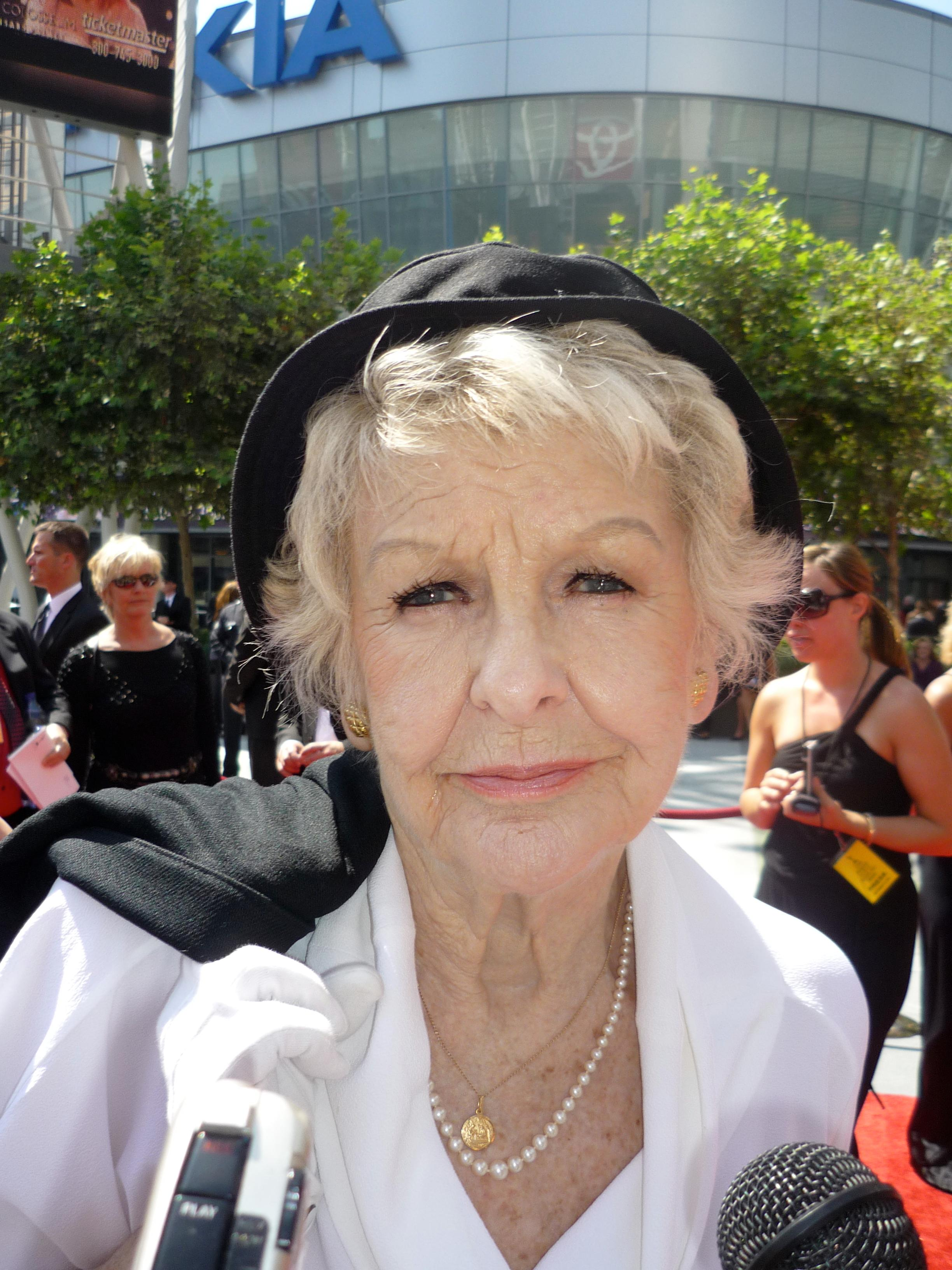
Alan Alda (left) and Elaine Stritch's (right) guest appearances on this episode were well received.

According to Nielsen Media Research, this episode of 30 Rock was watched by 4.759 million viewers during its original United States broadcast. The show claimed a 2.9 rating/5 share among viewers aged 18 to 49, meaning that 2.9 percent of all people in that group, and 5 percent of all people from that group watching television at the time, watched the episode. This was a decrease from the previous episode, "Chain Reaction of Mental Anguish", which was watched by 5.034 million American viewers.

Zack Handlen of The A.V. Club wrote that "Christmas Attack Zone" was a "nice holiday outing with a lot of great gag-writing", however "...I wouldn't put this up there with the show's best Christmas episodes. But I'd say it fits in nicely with the general run of competency to excellence we've been seeing so far this season. It was modestly funny, a little sweet, and not at all horrible." Alan Sepinwall from HitFix who is not a fan of Elaine Stritch's role on the show enjoyed her in this episode, writing that along with the appearances of Elizabeth Banks and Alan Alda "I decided to hope their presence would counteract my feelings about hers – which is pretty much what happened." Sepinwall enjoyed the subplots commenting that Tracy's "played well" and Jenna and Paul's "was both sweet and ridiculous". Brad Sanders of the Indiana Daily Student said it was "a ton of fun to watch" all the subplots play out and considered "Christmas Attack Zone" as "probably one of the two or three best episodes of the season thus far. In fact ... it may have been the best Christmas episode of 30 Rock yet." Johnny Firecloud of CraveOnline enjoyed Stritch and Alda's "wonderfully funny roles".

Entertainment Weekly's Annie Barrett opined that Stritch and Alda "really made this episode great." Meredith Blake, a contributor for the Los Angeles Times, opined that television Christmas episodes "are a sitcom staple, but ... they're also a risky proposition for a show like 30 Rock. Just how do you maintain the right balance between holiday cheer and year-round irreverence? It's a delicate formula, and on Thursday night 30 Rock got it just right. That is, they leaned toward the former, delivering a Christmas episode full of cynicism – but topped with just a sprinkle of sweetness." In addition, Blake was complimentary toward Stritch's role on the show. Bob Sassone of AOL's TV Squad wrote that this episode of 30 Rock "wasn't the best Christmas episode that [the show] has had. Past episodes like 'Ludachristmas,' 'Christmas Special' and 'Secret Santa' were put together better and had more heart". Sassone noted that the problem with "Christmas Attack Zone" was Tracy's subplot "as it wasn't very funny" and the one that dragged the episode down.
