= Mrs. Donaghy =

- 30 Rock episode
- Episode no.: Season 5 Episode 11
- Directed by: Tricia Brock
- Written by: Jack Burditt
- Production code: 511
- Original air date: January 20, 2011

Guest appearances
- Adam B. Shapiro as Jewish Man; Meng Ai as a technician; Jean Brassard as the minister; Todd Buonopane as Jeffrey Weinerslav; Tituss Burgess as D'Fwan; Cheyenne Jackson as Danny Baker; Chris Parnell as Dr. Leo Spaceman; Sherri Shepherd as Angie Jordan

Episode chronology
← Previous "Christmas Attack Zone"	Next → "Operation Righteous Cowboy Lightning"
- 30 Rock season 5

"Mrs. Donaghy" is the eleventh episode of the fifth season of the American television comedy series 30 Rock, and the 91st overall episode of the series. It was written by co-executive producer Jack Burditt and directed by Tricia Brock. The episode originally aired on NBC in the United States on January 20, 2011. Guest stars in this episode include Meng Ai, Jean Brassard, Todd Buonopane, Tituss Burgess, Cheyenne Jackson, Chris Parnell, and Sherri Shepherd.

In the episode, The Girlie Show with Tracy Jordan (TGS) staff are affected by budget cuts at NBC. Meanwhile, Jack Donaghy (Alec Baldwin) married his girlfriend Avery Jessup (Elizabeth Banks), but following the wedding, he learns that the minister (Brassard) did not marry the two of them. At the same time, TGS star Jenna Maroney (Jane Krakowski) shares a dressing room with her co-star Danny Baker (Jackson), and Tracy Jordan (Tracy Morgan) has a health scare.

Before the airing, NBC moved the program to a new timeslot at 10:00 p.m., moving it from its 8:30 p.m. slot that began in the beginning of the fifth season. This episode of 30 Rock was universally well received among television critics. According to Nielsen Media Research, "Mrs. Donaghy" was watched by 5.338 million households during its original broadcast, and received a 2.7 rating/7 share among viewers in the 18–49 demographic.

== Plot ==
Jack Donaghy (Alec Baldwin) married his girlfriend Avery Jessup (Elizabeth Banks) in the French Caribbean over New Year's. However, when he returns to New York following the nuptials, he discovers that he is instead married to his employee and friend Liz Lemon (Tina Fey). At the wedding, Liz was Jack's best man and wore a white shirt with a head net, while Avery wore a black dress. As a result of what Liz was wearing, the minister (Jean Brassard) instead married Jack and Liz. Jack informs Liz that the minister married the two of them instead of him and Avery. The two set out for a divorce; however, TGS with Tracy Jordan producer Pete Hornberger (Scott Adsit) tells Liz not to sign the divorce papers, as she can use their marriage to her advantage because TGS is affected by budget cuts at NBC as part of the merger with its new parent company, Kabletown. She demands that Jack, an executive at NBC, give the show its lost budget, but he denies the request. As a result, Liz will not sign the divorce papers unless her conditions are met.

Meanwhile, TGS star Jenna Maroney's (Jane Krakowski) dressing room is now a temporary room for a technician (Meng Ai), as Jack is renting space on the TGS floor in the 30 Rock building to keep the budget down. As a result, Jenna is forced to share a dressing room with her TGS co-star Danny Baker (Cheyenne Jackson). Immediately, the two start behaving like an old married couple. NBC page Kenneth Parcell (Jack McBrayer) gets upset about Jenna and Danny fighting and decides to stop their bickering. Kenneth interrupts one of their arguments by showing them a childish picture he drew of the two. This works to no avail, as Jenna and Danny continue arguing. To put a stop to this, Danny moves out from his dressing room and into the Y.

At the same time, TGS star Tracy Jordan (Tracy Morgan) is informed by Dr. Leo Spaceman (Chris Parnell) that he has health problems only found on dead people. Tracy and his wife Angie Jordan (Sherri Shepherd) meet with Jack and Tracy reveals what Dr. Spaceman told him. Angie becomes concerned on whether or not their family will be taken care of after Tracy dies. Jack offers Angie a job in the entertainment business and takes the opportunity to get even with Liz by assigning Angie as Liz's intern. Liz realizes that Angie's new job is Jack's way of messing with her. She explains to Angie that she is not getting paid to be her intern and fires her. Angie gets upset with Jack and Liz, but Jack offers her a reality show during TGS's time slot unless Liz signs the divorce papers. Liz, however, still refuses—even admitting she likes the concept of a reality show starring Angie and would watch it. To get back at Jack, Liz holds a press conference and announces that she and Jack have decided to donate $5 million to The Jack and Elizabeth Donaghy High School for Teen Drama, The Arts, and Feelings. The next day, Jack and Liz have a sit down meeting with NBC Human resource mediator Jeffrey Weinerslav (Todd Buonopane) to discuss their marriage, as NBC has strict anti-nepotism guidelines. During the meeting, the two realize that they have had the longest and most meaningful relationship either of them has ever had. They apologize to each other and Liz agrees to sign the divorce papers, while Jack promises to restore TGS's budget.

== Production ==
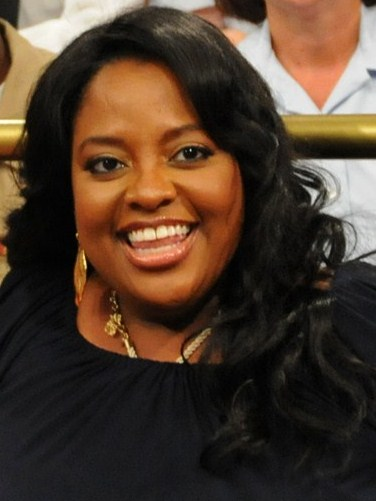
Sherri Shepherd guest starred in "Mrs. Donaghy" as Angie Jordan

This episode of 30 Rock was written by co-executive producer Jack Burditt, his second episode for the fifth season, and his fourteenth writing credit after "Jack Meets Dennis", "The Baby Show", "The Fighting Irish", "Cleveland", "Rosemary's Baby", "Subway Hero", "Sandwich Day", "The One with the Cast of Night Court", "St. Valentine's Day", "The Ones", "Kidney Now!", "Don Geiss, America and Hope", and "Let's Stay Together". The episode was directed by Tricia Brock, making it her second for the series after directing the March 19, 2009, episode "The Bubble" from the show's third season. "Mrs. Donaghy" originally aired in the United States on January 20, 2011, on NBC as the eleventh episode of the show's fifth season and the 91st overall episode of the series.

The episode featured several appearances by several frequent guest stars, including Todd Buonopane as NBC Human resource mediator Jeffrey Weinerslav, Cheyenne Jackson as TGS cast member Danny Baker, Chris Parnell as Dr. Leo Spaceman, and Sherri Shepherd as Angie Jordan the wife of Tracy Jordan. Buonopane, Jackson, Parnell, and Shepherd made their fifth, eighth, sixteenth, and sixth appearances on the show, respectively. In an interview with TV Guide in November 2010, co-showrunner and executive producer Robert Carlock revealed that Shepherd's character "will be getting her own Real Housewives-type reality show. Having the cameras around forces Tracy to act on better behavior." This is evident in the following episode "Operation Righteous Cowboy Lightning". Tina Fey, the series creator, executive producer and lead actress on 30 Rock, told Entertainment Weekly, in regards to Angie's reality show, "We're hoping to, maybe, if we can get away with it, do an entire episode that's just an episode of Queen of Jordan. Now I'm just superimposing my own TV viewing habits onto 30 Rock." In the episode, Dr. Spaceman informs Tracy Jordan—played by Tracy Morgan—that he is dying. Television columnist Meredith Blake from the Los Angeles Times wondered if this subplot was written as a way to deal with Tracy Morgan's recent kidney transplant, as he was expected to miss several episodes to recover from the procedure.

In the episode, it is revealed that Jack Donaghy accidentally married Liz Lemon instead of his girlfriend Avery Jessup (Elizabeth Banks). At the wedding, Liz was Jack's best man and wore a white shirt with a head net, while Avery wore a black cocktail dress. As a result of what Liz was wearing, the minister (Jean Brassard) instead married Jack and Liz. The two decide to get a divorce; however, they use their marriage to get the upper hand over one another. Ultimately, Jack and Liz decide to stop their feud and get a divorce. Since beginning, the series has occasionally hinted at a romantic relationship between the two characters. In one episode, Jack passes Liz off as his live-in girlfriend to his ex-wife Bianca (Isabella Rossellini) to make her jealous. In another episode, Jack's mother Colleen Donaghy (Elaine Stritch) tells him that Liz is a perfect match for him. In the same episode, he has Liz listed as his emergency contact. In an April 2010 Esquire interview, Fey said that one of the plots that 30 Rock will never do is have Liz and Jack get together. "Let me put the Internet at ease: Liz and Jack will never be together." Alec Baldwin was asked if the two characters will ever hook-up, he responded "I sincerely doubt it, and I think the show is better off that way. Once they cross that line, all the tension goes out of those relationships. And I think the lesson we learned about both those characters is that they are married to their jobs and they are married to their work."

== Cultural references ==
Dr. Spaceman tells Tracy that he is dating Squeaky Fromme and says that she is a handful. Fromme is a member of the Manson Family, and was sentenced to life imprisonment for attempting to assassinate United States President Gerald Ford in 1975. Jenna and Danny begin arguing after the two are forced to share a dressing room. She takes down Danny's poster of the Montreal Alouettes, a Canadian Football League team based in Montreal, Quebec, which was signed by Marc Trestman, the head coach of the Alouettes. Jenna says that she took down the poster because it was tacky, as are his mother's chain e-mails (a message that attempts to induce the recipient to make a number of copies of the letter and then pass them on to as many recipients as possible).

Later, Jack gives Angie a reality show that will feature her friends and family. The show is a parody of the reality show The Real Housewives of..., which airs on the cable network Bravo and follows the lives of relatively affluent, bourgeois housewives and professional women in the suburban or urban areas of several American cities. During the press conference, in which Liz announces that she and Jack have decided to donate $5 million to "a high school for drama, the arts, and feelings", Liz spoke as socialite Edith Bouvier Beale. Later, Jack asks Liz what that voice was with Liz responding that it was "Drew Barrymore's impression of that crazy lady," a reference to actress Drew Barrymore who portrayed Beale in the 2009 HBO film Grey Gardens.

== Reception ==
=== Ratings ===
Before the airing of this episode, NBC unveiled its 2010–11 primetime schedule in May 2010 with the network moving 30 Rock from the 9:30 p.m. time to the 8:30 p.m. timeslot for the show's fifth season. In November 2010, it was announced that the program would move from 8:30 to the 10:00 timeslot. The network moved 30 Rock to the 10:00 time in order to "make room" for the return of the comedy show Parks and Recreation and the debut of the new comedy Perfect Couples. Many questioned whether or not it was a good decision to move the show to 10:00 as it is a low rated show. According to Nielsen Media Research, "Mrs. Donaghy" was watched by 5.338 million households in its original American broadcast. According to New York magazine the staff were most worried about how 30 Rock and Community—another program that airs on NBC's Thursday lineup—would do in the new time change but said that both shows "did great." The episode earned a 2.7 rating/7 share in the 18–49 demographic. This means that it was seen by 2.7 percent of all 18- to 49-year-olds, and 7 percent of all 18- to 49-year-olds watching television at the time of the broadcast. "Mrs. Donaghy" was up nearly 30 percent against the previous episode, "Christmas Attack Zone", that aired at 8:30 p.m. on December 9, 2010.

=== Reviews ===
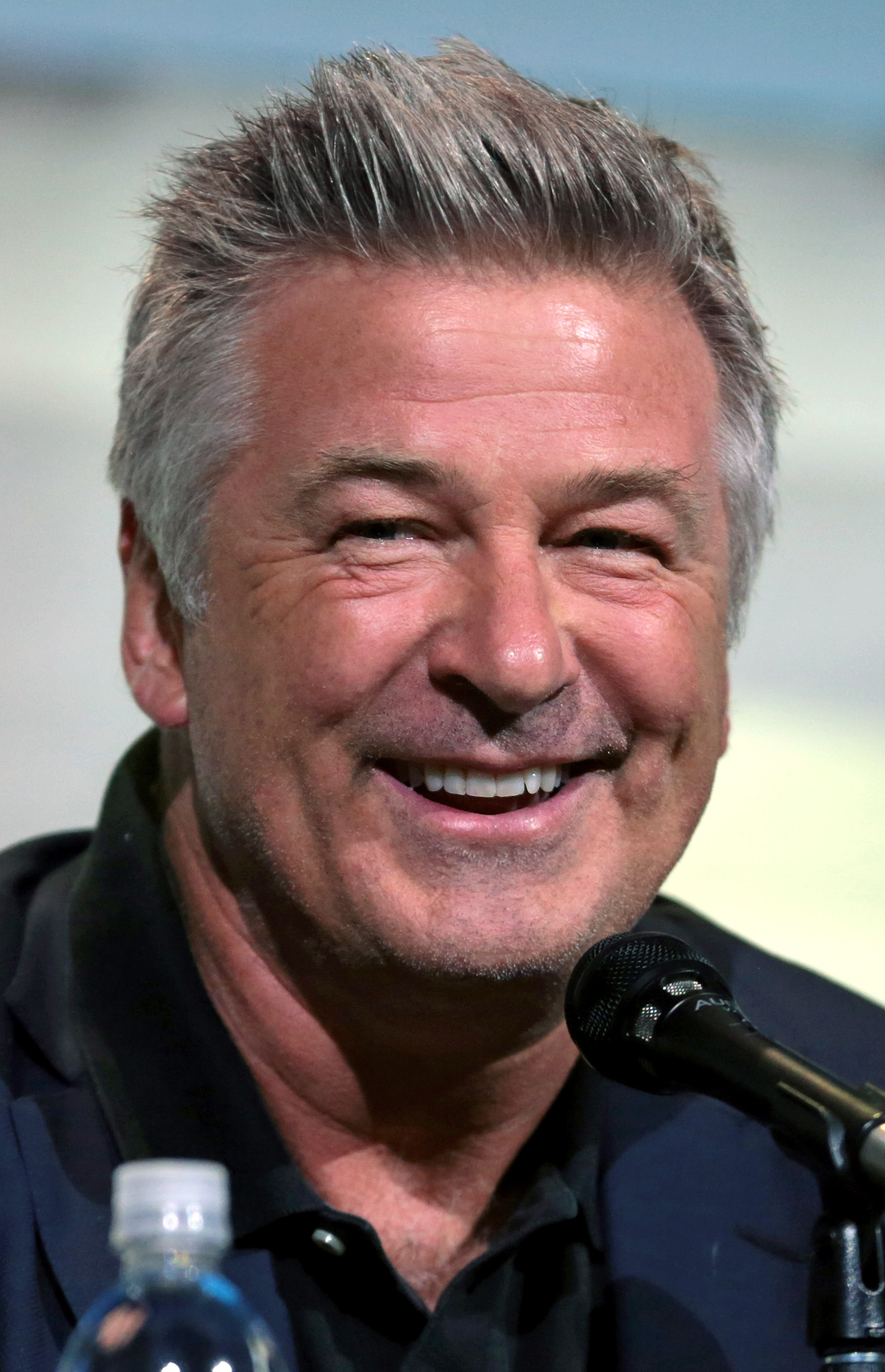
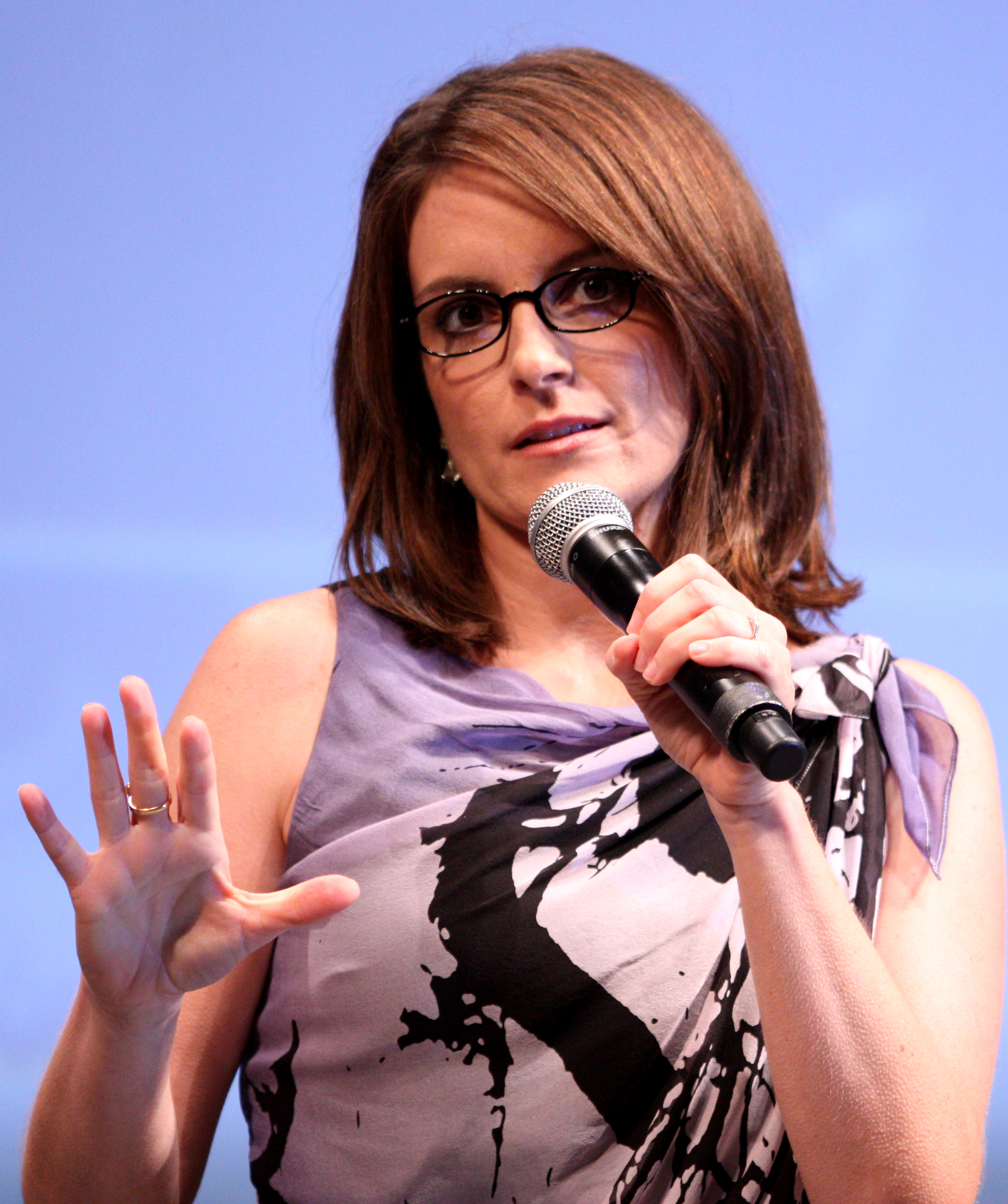
Johnny Firecloud of CraveOnline wrote that the chemistry between Alec Baldwin (left) and Tina Fey (right) "is uniquely special, both affectionately antagonistic and creepily parental at times. [...] [Their television characters] very much belong together, but certainly not romantically, and the writers' ability to recognize this without diving too seriously into the 'will they or won't they?' ... is a true testament to the self-restraint and greatness of the show."

The A.V. Club's Zack Handlen noted that the Jack and Liz being married plot "was strong enough to carry the episode overall, as watching Liz drive Jack crazy is almost always entertaining." Handlen did not enjoy the other two stories from the episode, citing that Jenna and Danny's "had some good lines" and that it was good to see these two characters play off each other, but "this really needed to get a lot crazier, or else have some sort of character development", and that the third plot was only worth towards the opening credits to Angie's reality show. "This was hilarious ... but everything else was like watching echoes of old gags. [...] There wasn't a lot of connective tissue to hold any of this together, so it came across as haphazard." Juli Weiner of Vanity Fair wrote that this was a "fine episode about marriage and mistranslation." Weiner, however, opined that the portrayal of Angie Jordan here, played by Sherri Shepherd, "was less than ideal." Alan Sepinwall from HitFix wrote that the show is having a strong season with its fifth season, but wrote that this episode was not a particularly strong one nonetheless "the writers can almost always rely on the Jack/Liz relationship for both heart ... and comedy. It was the first part of the episode that made me consistently laugh, and it also worked because I like Jack and Liz – and like that the show remains committed to a complete lack of romantic tension between them". TV Guide's Matt Roush was glad that Chris Parnell returned as his 30 Rock character in this episode. Ian McDonald of Zap2it wrote that the Jeffrey character "made one of the best in-jokes of the episode, recapping (and misinterpreting) Liz and Jack's 'will they/won't they chemistry.' The kicker, though, was we're meant to realize that Liz and Jack are perfect for each other in a completely platonic way." McDonald was positive about Jane Krakowski and Cheyenne Jackson's subplot, saying it was nice to see them share a story, and that their characters "have great, toxic chemistry." Bob Sassone of TV Squad said that the ending in which the Jeffrey character summarized Jack and Liz's friendship "was a perfect summation of the heart of 30 Rock itself."

IGN contributor Matt Fowler commented that the Jenna and Danny story "felt weak" but that Angie getting her own show "more than made up for it." Fowler gave the episode an 8 out of 10 rating. Brad Sanders of the Indiana Daily Student commented that "Mrs. Donaghy" had a "solid comeback", while Entertainment Weekly's Breia Brissey was glad that the show returned. "The strength of ['Mrs. Donaghy'] was that, however silly, all of the illogical circumstances of the show can be explained with a bit of reason", reported Caitlin Smith of The Atlantic. Smith said her favorite scene was when Jack and Liz have a sit down meeting with Jeffrey, and "[h]e's counseling the newly married couple to avoid bringing their personal relationship into work and reads off a lengthy checklist of things to avoid." Meredith Blake from the Los Angeles Times explained that the reason the series is having a strong season is due to it returning to the basics with the Jack and Liz friendship; "Somehow, Liz and Jack are such a perfect, if unexpected, pair that this theme manages not to wear thin. Their accidental marriage ... was almost inevitable, the logical end to which the writers could stretch the relationship. It does make you wonder what the writers can possibly do next, but I have faith." New York magazine's Willa Paskin enjoyed Tina Fey's impression of Edith Bouvier Beale during her press conference. Elliott Hammer of The Collegian wrote that Angie's tagline for her reality show "I'm Angie and I think elegance and attitude are the same thing" was brilliant.

Dan Forcella of TV Fanatic commented that "[t]here were moments when I laughed" but that "Mrs. Donaghy" did not come together to make a great episode. He noted that Jack and Liz discovering that they were married "didn't bring much new to the table. Jack and Liz arguing like this is standard for 30 Rock, and I got bored of their story rather quickly." Further in his recap, Forcella said that the ending scene, with Jeffrey explaining all of the things Jack and Liz have done together as close friends, "was almost as if they expected us to predict one of them was going to think it was something more than a friendship, and then flip it on the audience." Kelsea Stahler of the New York Post noted that when it was revealed that Jack accidentally married Liz that it "fell a little flat", reasoning "I mean, Jack accidentally married [Liz], this scene could have reached so many levels of insanity, but instead they settled for Jonathan's (Maulik Pancholy) piercing squeal before moving onto the rest of the show." Johnny Firecloud of CraveOnline did not enjoy the Jenna, Danny, and Kenneth plot explaining that it unfolded "very strangely, and eventually saps a good deal of energy out of the show. It's a dead-end sub-plot that's simply useless." Firecloud gave this episode a 7 out of 10 rating.
