= Chain Reaction of Mental Anguish =

- 30 Rock episode
- Episode no.: Season 5 Episode 9
- Directed by: Ken Whittingham
- Written by: Kay Cannon
- Production code: 509
- Original air date: December 2, 2010

Guest appearances
- Will Forte as Paul; Kelly Coffield Park as Aunt Linda; Michael Benjamin Washington as Donald; Benjamin Cook as Young Jack

Episode chronology
← Previous "College"	Next → "Christmas Attack Zone"
- 30 Rock season 5

"Chain Reaction of Mental Anguish" is the ninth episode of the fifth season of the American television comedy series 30 Rock, and the 89th overall episode of the series. It was written by co-producer Kay Cannon and directed by Ken Whittingham. The episode originally aired on NBC in the United States on December 2, 2010.

In the episode, Jack Donaghy (Alec Baldwin) tries to help Tracy Jordan (Tracy Morgan) when his "son" returns and asks for money to fund an ill-conceived theme restaurant; Liz Lemon (Tina Fey) turns to Kenneth Parcell (Jack McBrayer) as a relationship therapist; and Jenna Maroney (Jane Krakowski) thinks her boyfriend Paul (Will Forte) may pop an important question.

== Plot ==
When Tracy Jordan (Tracy Morgan) asks Jack Donaghy (Alec Baldwin) to invest in his con artist "son" Donald's (guest star Michael Benjamin Washington) ill-conceived theme restaurant, Jack becomes concerned. He believes that Tracy is letting sentiment get in the way and allowing himself to be taken for a ride. Jack tells Tracy he needs to cut Donald off like any other parent. Therefore, Donald would be prevented from scamming Tracy out of any more of his money.

At the same time, Liz Lemon (Tina Fey) is having doubts about her relationship with Carol (Matt Damon) but is unable to vent her concerns to Jack since he is too busy trying to sort out Tracy's problem. Instead, Jack recommends that she sees a therapist, so she appoints Kenneth Parcell (Jack McBrayer) as her relationship therapist. However, this leads to further problems when Liz makes a comment about her uncle Harold that reminds Kenneth of one of his own traumas. Jack ends up having to resolve this issue as well by appointing himself Kenneth's therapist. Kenneth explains to Jack that he once had a pig named Harold whom he loved and looked up to as a father, but was eventually forced to sell. Later, when he needed money for a ferry ride to NBC, he was forced to eat Harold in a pig eating contest. Jack tells Kenneth that by eating Harold, he gave his death meaning, but this brings back memories of problems with his father, Jimmy Donaghy. At the end, Jack reveals to Tracy and Donald that when he received the part of protein in a school play, his father Jimmy Donaghy destroyed his confidence, which resulted in him forgetting his lines. He therefore tells Tracy to support Donald in his dreams since his father never did. After hearing of Jack's blunders, Donald is reluctant to accept his father's help until Jack recites his part in the school play.

Finally, Jenna Maroney (Jane Krakowski) is excited about her relationship with Jenna impersonator Paul (Will Forte), believing that he is going to pop the question, although the question she has in mind is that of a sex tape. As it turns out, Paul wants to solidify their relationship and take it to the next level by inviting Jenna to meet his parents. This worries Jenna, who doesn't want to commit herself to a long term relationship and instead decides to break up with Paul.

== Reception ==
According to the Nielsen Media Research, this episode of 30 Rock was watched by 5.03 million households in its original American broadcast. It earned a 2.3 rating/6 share in the 18–49 demographic. This means that it was seen by 2.3 percent of all 18- to 49-year-olds, and 6 percent of all 18- to 49-year-olds watching television at the time of the broadcast.

Alan Sepinwall, writing for HitFix called the episode "flawed but funny" and opined that "an episode filled with things I don't usually enjoy about 30 Rock these days - Liz freaking out about a relationship for no particular reason, Kenneth stories from home (and a lot of Kenneth, period), Tracy's ridiculous "son" Donald, etc. - and yet one where I kept laughing in spite of that." Writing for The A.V. Club, Nathan Rabin scored the episode A− and called it "an all-around winner, an elegantly constructed episode that delivered a steady stream of laughs and managed to somehow make the ridiculous moment when Jack recites his spiel from an elementary school play about science both funny and strangely moving".

Dan Forcella for TV Fanatic commented that the episode "was the continuation of a decent season, but it didn't pack as much of a punch as the past two episodes" and criticized Jenna's storyline particularly, writing that the character "having a boyfriend that dresses up like her and does strange sexual things with her is just weird and gross".
