= Operation Righteous Cowboy Lightning =

- 30 Rock episode
- Episode no.: Season 5 Episode 12
- Directed by: Beth McCarthy-Miller
- Written by: Robert Carlock
- Production code: 512
- Original air date: January 27, 2011

Guest appearances
- Robert De Niro as himself; Lester Holt as himself; Sherri Shepherd as Angie Jordan; Dean Winters as Dennis Duffy

Episode chronology
← Previous "Mrs. Donaghy"	Next → "¡Qué Sorpresa!"
- 30 Rock season 5

"Operation Righteous Cowboy Lightning" is the twelfth episode of the fifth season of the American television comedy series 30 Rock. It was written by executive producer Robert Carlock. The director of this episode was Beth McCarthy-Miller. It originally aired on NBC in the United States on January 27, 2011. Guest stars in this episode include Robert De Niro, Lester Holt, Sherri Shepherd, and Dean Winters.

In the episode, Jack Donaghy (Alec Baldwin) decides to pre-tape a celebrity benefit for a natural disaster, but his plan goes terribly wrong. Meanwhile, Tracy Jordan (Tracy Morgan) continues to drive Liz Lemon (Tina Fey) crazy with his irresponsibility. However, when a reality show camera crew starts to follow Tracy around, Liz tries to use it to her advantage.

"Operation Righteous Cowboy Lightning" was universally well received and praised by television critics. According to Nielsen Media Research, the episode was watched by 4.922 million households during its original broadcast, and received a 2.4 rating/7 share among viewers in the 18–49 demographic.

== Plot ==
Liz Lemon (Tina Fey) and Jack Donaghy (Alec Baldwin) watch the installation of a large Kabletown sign on 30 Rockefeller Plaza. No longer a GE employee and now working for Kabletown, Jack decides to conquer this new phase in his life just as he did before. After researching, he finds that the most watched reality programs of the past five years are celebrity benefits for natural disasters. Since all the networks air benefits at the same time, no one network has an advantage nor dominates in the ratings. To combat this, Jack decides to pre-tape a benefit to air on the night of the next natural disaster. When a disaster devastates an island called Mago, Jack is ecstatic until he finds out that the island is owned by the infamous troubled actor, Mel Gibson. Regardless, the event is a success.

Meanwhile, Tracy Jordan (Tracy Morgan) pushes Liz's buttons as usual by not showing up to rehearsals and leaving work to do something insane. However, Tracy's demeanor instantly changes when a camera crew starts to follow him around for his wife's new reality show. He starts to act responsible and respectful in front of the cameras, as he wants to avoid ruining his chances of winning an Oscar. Liz has the idea to use Tracy's fake good behavior to get him to do things he blew off in the past, knowing that he can't refuse while taped. This works until Tracy finds a loophole. When Liz tries to get Tracy to do more things, he refuses and insults Liz to the melody of "Uptown Girl" by Billy Joel. Since the song is copyrighted, any footage containing that song can't be used. Therefore, Tracy's irresponsibility wouldn't be aired on the show. Liz tries to outcrazy him with autotune, but she later realizes that she can't match his insanity. They finally talk it out alone and each argues that the other person would have been a failure without their help. Nevertheless, cameras manage to film this and Tracy and Liz refuse to make up. However, when the show edits their various confrontations and uses two look-alikes to create a make up scene along to the song "Secrets" by OneRepublic, both Liz and Tracy are moved to tears and make up for real.

At the same time, the TGS writers become paranoid thinking of disasters for the pre-recorded specials, and come up with a plan to regroup in the event of a disaster. However, while deciding what skills each has, they figure that Lutz (John Lutz) has no useful skills, until he mentions that he has a car which can drive them; but it is a small car and can only hold three passengers. The other staffers all dote on Lutz in order to get a spot, but Lutz in truth does not have a car. However, when Frank gets four tickets to a film test screening in New Jersey, Lutz runs out and buys a beat-up used car. The staff realize that he just bought the car (which has flames put on the side by Lutz with magic marker and tape), and refuse to ride in it. Lutz tries to stop them, but the car is stolen while he is not looking.

== Cultural references ==
This episode continues to satirize the acquisition of NBCUniversal by Comcast. Liz tries to tell Jack what a Snart is (which is to sneeze and fart simultaneously) because it is ten o'clock. This refers 30 Rock's move from the 8:30 pm to the 10:00 pm timeslot. Tracy plans to get an island like Nicolas Cage, Celine Dion, and Charles Widmore, the latter being a fictional character from Lost. The whole cast of TGS is being filmed by the cameras of Angie Jordan's (wife of Tracy) new reality show, Queen of Jordan, which Jack commissioned in the previous episode, "Mrs. Donaghy". Eventually, an episode of 30 Rock was filmed as an episode of "Queen of Jordan".

The episode references the ongoing storyline of Liz's desire to become a mother when Kenneth gives Liz a memo he could not put in her mailbox because it was full of unread adoption materials. This story first began in the show's first season and continued in the third season.

Tracy and Liz fight in several ways, all of them involving masking their arguments in ways that cannot be used in the reality show for copyright reasons, such as singing along with the Billy Joel song "Uptown Girl" or wearing a New York Rangers goalie mask.

Jack films a pre-taped disaster event special, which he uses when a hurricane strikes Mago Island. This backfires because there were only two victims. The victims were the island's owner, actor Mel Gibson, who was highly publicized for his personal troubles, and his guest, Jon Gosselin.

While considering his new position as a Kabletown executive, Jack mentions "stout Cortez" and quotes the poem "On First Looking into Chapman's Homer" by John Keats. Tracy later also mentions feeling like "Stout Cortez," but this time in reference to his gardener.

== Reception ==
According to Nielsen Media Research, "Operation Righteous Cowboy Lightning" was watched by 4.922 million households in its original American broadcast. It earned a 2.4 rating/7 share in the 18–49 demographic. This means that it was seen by 2.4 percent of all 18- to 49-year-olds, and 7 percent of all 18- to 49-year-olds watching television at the time of the broadcast. This was a decrease from the previous episode, "Mrs. Donaghy", which was watched by 5.338 million American viewers. It turned out to be the most-watched episode of the show until the series finale on January 31, 2013.
