= Ben Cook (actor) =

American stage actor (born 1997)

Benjamin Cook
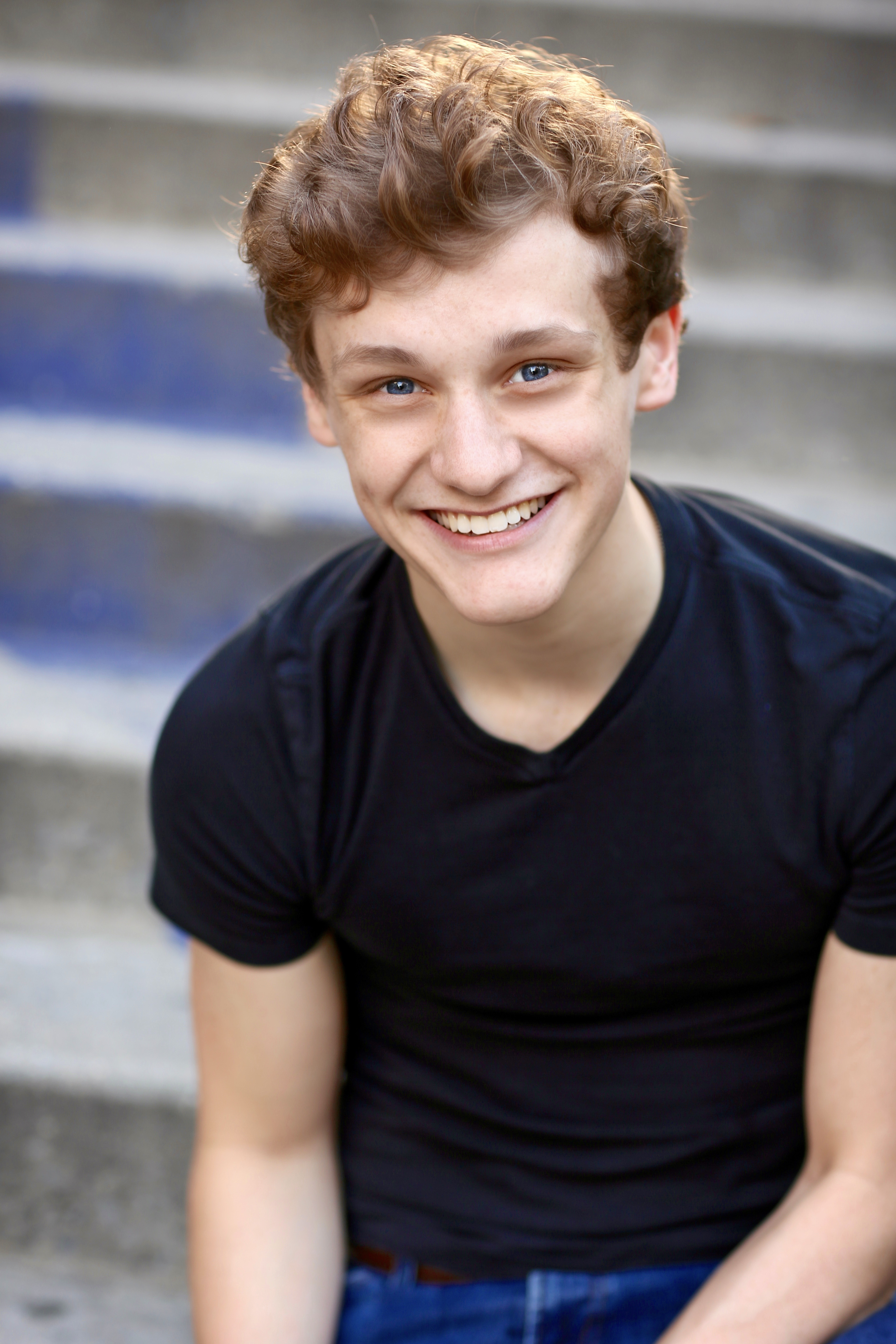
- Ben Cook in 2016
- Born: Benjamin Tyler Cook; December 11, 1997 (age 28); Eden, North Carolina, U.S.
- Education: Professional Performing Arts School
- Occupations: Actor; singer; dancer
- Years active: 2007–present

Benjamin Tyler Cook (born December 11, 1997) is an American actor, singer and dancer, known for his work across stage and screen.

Cook has appeared on the Broadway stage in Ragtime, Billy Elliot the Musical (for which he was nominated for a Helen Hayes Award), Tuck Everlasting, Mean Girls, West Side Story, and Illinoise. He has also performed in two Broadway national tours, Billy Elliot the Musical and Newsies the Musical, and appeared on television in episodes of 30 Rock, House of Cards, Veep, Law & Order: Special Victims Unit, and in the HBO film Paterno. He most recently appeared as a Jet in the 2021 film version of West Side Story and as Henry in the HBO Max horror series Pretty Little Liars (2022–2024), a reboot of the original 2010s series.

== Early life ==
Cook was born in Eden, North Carolina, and grew up in New York City and Lorton, Virginia. He is the youngest child of Jill and Glenn Cook. His mother is the executive director of the American School Counsellor Association. His father is a photographer, blogger, and publishing consultant.

In his youth, Cook was friends with YouTuber and current film director Christopher Cox (formerly known as CACox97 on YouTube), and appeared in numerous Nerf videos, such as Nerf War, Nerf War 2 and Nerf Raider War. He attended the Professional Performing Arts School in New York City for middle school and during high school.

== Career ==
=== Musical theatre ===
Cook performed in several productions as a child in Washington, D.C., including at Ford's Theatre and the John F. Kennedy Center for the Performing Arts. He made his Broadway debut at the age of eleven in Ragtime at the Neil Simon Theatre, understudying and performing the role of Edgar (The Little Boy). His next Broadway role was Tall Boy in Billy Elliot the Musical at the Imperial Theatre, and played the roles of Michael, then Billy in the North American National Tour of the production. His final tour performance as "Billy" was in Las Vegas, Nevada, on May 19, 2013.

From the age of 16, he toured for a year and a half in the role of Race and occasionally performed the role of Crutchie as the understudy in the first national tour of Newsies the Musical. In January 2016, after over 500 performances, Cook left that tour and joined the original Broadway cast of Tuck Everlasting. Previews began in March 2016, and the show closed the same May.

Cook joined the ensemble of the musical adaptation of the film Mean Girls. Its pre-Broadway tryout began in October 2017 at the National Theatre, in Washington D.C. The show premiered on Broadway in April 2018. He was set to appear in the 2020 Broadway revival of West Side Story as Riff, the leader of the Jets, but he left the production after being injured in a preview performance.

=== Film and television ===
On television, Cook appeared as young Jack on 30 Rock, in the episode "Chain Reaction of Mental Anguish" (2010); and as Walt in the episode of the HBO series Veep titled "The Choice" (2014). He played Heather Dunbar's son in the episode "Chapter 27" of the Netflix series House of Cards (2013). On Law & Order: Special Victims Unit, he played Adam Turner in the episode "Great Expectations" (2017).

Cook reprised his role of Race in Newsies in the film adaptation of the musical, which received a limited release in February 2017 and later on Netflix before moving to Disney+. In 2018, he appeared in the HBO film Paterno.

He also appeared in the 2021 film adaptation of West Side Story as Mouthpiece, a member of the Jets. He appeared as Beckett in the 2023 movie Happiness for Beginners, a film adaptation of the 2015 book of the same name.

== Credits ==
=== Theatre ===
Theatre
Date	Title	Role	Theatre	Note
November 16-December 30, 2007	A Christmas Carol	Tiny Tim	Ford's Theatre	Washington D.C.
February 28- April 13, 2008	Macbeth	Young Macduff	Folger Shakespeare Library	Washington D.C.
December 2- December 28, 2008	A Christmas Carol	Urchin, Ignorance, Turkey Boy	Ford's Theatre	Washington D.C.
February 3- March 8, 2009	The Heavens Are Hung in Black	Tad Lincoln	Lansburgh Theatre	Washington D.C.
April 18- May 17, 2009	Ragtime	Understudy: Edgar (The little boy)	John F. Kennedy Center for the Performing Arts	Washington D.C.
November 15, 2009-January 10, 2010	Ragtime	Understudy: Edgar (The little boy)	Neil Simon Theatre	Broadway
March 12– April 4, 2010	The Golden Age	The Page	John F. Kennedy Center for the Performing Arts	Washington D.C.
July 7, 2010-October 14, 2011	Billy Elliot the Musical	Tall/Posh Boy, Understudy: Michael	Imperial Theatre	Broadway
November 3, 2011-January 22, 2012	Billy Elliot the Musical	Michael	National Tour	National Tour
June 30, 2012-May 19, 2013	Billy Elliot the Musical	Billy	National Tour	National Tour
October 11, 2014-January 31, 2016	Newsies the Musical	Race, Understudy: Crutchie	National Tour	National Tour
April 26- May 29, 2016	Tuck Everlasting	Ensemble, Understudy: Jesse Tuck, Hugo	Broadhurst Theatre	Broadway
October 31– December 3, 2017	Mean Girls	Ensemble	National Theatre (Washington, D.C.)	Pre-Broadway Out of Town Run
April 8, 2018-April 8, 2019	Mean Girls	Ensemble	August Wilson Theatre	Broadway
Previews began: December 10, 2019; Left production on: January 5, 2020	West Side Story	Riff	Broadway Theatre	Broadway
June 23–July 2, 2023	Illinoise	Will/Player	Bard SummerScape	Regional
January 28– February 18, 2024	Illinoise	Carl/Player	Chicago Shakespeare Theater	Regional
March 2– March 26, 2024	Illinoise	Carl/Player	Park Avenue Armory	Off-Broadway
April 24– August 10, 2024	Illinoise	Carl/Player	St. James Theatre	Broadway

=== Film ===
Year	Title	Role	Notes
2021	West Side Story	"Mouthpiece"	
2023	Happiness for Beginners	Beckett	

=== Television ===
Year	Title	Role	Notes
2010	30 Rock	Young Jack Donaghy	Episode: "Chain Reaction of Mental Anguish"
2013	House of Cards	Heather Dunbar's son	Episode: "Chapter 27"
2014	Veep	Walt	Episode: "The Choice"
2017	Law & Order: Special Victims Unit	Adam Turner	Episode: "Great Expectations"
2018	Paterno	Aaron Fisher	Television film
2022	The First Lady	Steven Ford	Recurring; 5 episodes
2022–2024	Pretty Little Liars	Henry Nelson	Recurring; 16 episodes
2023	FBI: Most Wanted	Luke Spottiswood	Episode: "Black Mirror"
2024	The Penguin	Calvin	Recurring; 2 episodes

== Awards ==
Year	Award	Category	Role	Result	Ref.
2012	Helen Hayes Awards	Outstanding Supporting Performer, Non-Resident Production	Billy Elliot the Musical	Nominated	
2022	Critics' Choice Awards	Best Acting Ensemble	West Side Story	Nominated	
2024	Outer Critics Circle Awards	Outstanding Featured Performer in an Off-Broadway Musical	Illinoise	Nominated	
