= ¡Qué Sorpresa! =

- 30 Rock episode
- Episode no.: Season 5 Episode 13
- Directed by: John Riggi
- Written by: Matt Hubbard
- Production code: 513
- Original air date: February 3, 2011

Guest appearances
- Ken Howard as Hank Hooper; Vanessa Minnillo as Carmen Chao; Brian Williams as himself; Richard Belzer as Sgt. John Munch; Ice-T as Det. Odafin Tutuola; Elizabeth Banks as Avery Jessup

Episode chronology
| ← Previous "Operation Righteous Cowboy Lightning" | Next → "Double-Edged Sword" |
- 30 Rock season 5

"¡Qué Sorpresa!" is the thirteenth episode of the fifth season of the American television comedy series 30 Rock, and the 93rd overall episode of the series. It was directed by John Riggi, and written by Matt Hubbard. The episode originally aired on NBC in the United States on February 3, 2011. Guest stars include Ken Howard, Vanessa Minnillo, Brian Williams, Richard Belzer, Ice-T, and Elizabeth Banks.

In the episode, Jack Donaghy (Alec Baldwin) meets with Kabletown's boss, Hank Hooper. Jack doesn't like Hank's tactics of being a friendly boss, so he steals Kenneth Parcell's (Jack McBrayer) idea in order to impress him. Liz Lemon (Tina Fey) keeps Avery Jessup's pregnancy from relentless reporter Carmen Chao (Vanessa Minnillo). Meanwhile, Tracy Jordan (Tracy Morgan) and Jenna Maroney (Jane Krakowski) fight over a sweatshirt.

According to Nielsen Media Research, "¡Qué Sorpresa!" was watched by 4.784 million viewers during its original broadcast and received a 2.4 rating/6 share among adults aged 18–49.

== Plot ==
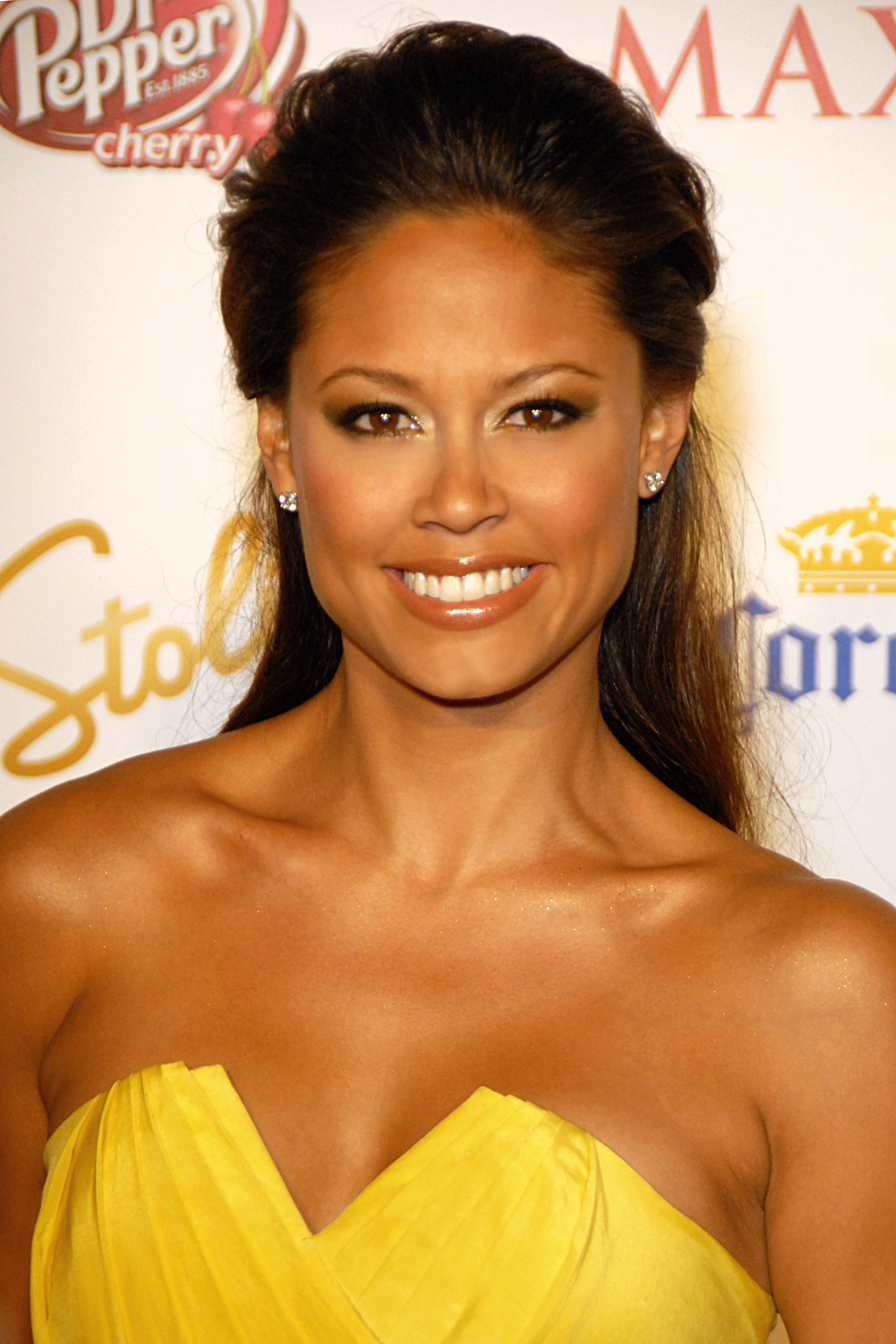
Vanessa Minnillo guest starred in the episode as Avery's rival Carmen Chao

Jack Donaghy (Alec Baldwin) goes to the TGS set and tells them that Hank Hooper (Ken Howard), the boss of NBC's Kabletown, is touring 30 Rockefeller Plaza and orders all of them, especially Tracy Jordan (Tracy Morgan) and Jenna Maroney (Jane Krakowski), to act normal and expresses to them his desire to make a good first impression. Meanwhile, Tracy and Jenna receive a gift basket from Hank Hooper. The gift basket contains two MacBook Airs, watches, and cellphones. Both are very happy with the gift basket until they see only one Kabletown sweatshirt. Tracy begrudgingly lets Jenna have it.

Later, Jack tells Liz Lemon (Tina Fey) to go shopping for baby supplies with Avery Jessup (Elizabeth Banks), who has cleverly hidden her third-trimester pregnancy from her co-workers by wearing "fashionable" wizard cloaks. Jack goes on to tell her that Avery's dream career as the Financial reporter for NBC Nightly News would not be possible if they find out about the pregnancy. Carmen Chao (Vanessa Minnillo), an MSNBC reporter with an unknown ethnic background, is relentlessly trying to reveal Avery's secret pregnancy. Avery and Liz meet Carmen at the baby store, where Liz protects Avery's secret pregnancy by saying that she herself is pregnant. Knowing this to be false, Carmen schedules an "interview" with Liz about single mothers.

Jenna and Tracy continue to fight over the sweatshirt, so they talk to Liz about it, where both are wearing one side of the sweatshirt. Pete Hornberger (Scott Adsit) tells them to lay off Liz because she is "pregnant". As a result, Liz goes on to get the sweatshirt and throws it in the trashcan.

Jack meets Hank, who hugs him at first sight in the executive dining room (which Hank turned into an "Everyone Dining Room"), much to Jack's horror. While eating, Hank convinces Jack to do an employee pitch day, where every employee can pitch their ideas to upper management. "Employee Pitch Day" doesn't go well, so Jack pitches an idea of his own to Hank. His idea is the Voice-Activated remote (or "Vo-Act"). Jack's idea is also unsuccessful, as the characters on the TV can also control the television. With no apparent choice, he steals Kenneth's idea: the Blah-Bar, where there is a black bar on the bottom part of the screen that prevents people from seeing any dirty content. Jack tells Kenneth what he has done and asks him what he wants in return. However, Kenneth wants nothing.

Meanwhile, Liz's plan backfires when the TGS staff hears that she is pregnant. Jack convinces Liz to keep it that way, but Carmen keeps questioning Liz intensely. To really get the truth out of Liz, Carmen makes her do sexy pregnancy photos. During the photo shoot, Carmen tells Liz that she knows she's not pregnant and tries to convince her to admit it, but Carmen and her cameraman run away quickly when they see Liz grab oil and rub it on her stomach.

Eventually, Jack tells Hank about stealing Kenneth's idea while Kenneth is in the room. Jack apologizes and files for his resignation, but Hank says that they're "gonna be just fine." Since Kenneth wanted no reparations, Hank suggests they hug. Kenneth joyfully accepts this proposition.

In the end, Avery is moved to NBC Nightly News (to Carmen's chagrin) and her pregnancy is finally revealed. To acknowledge their gratefulness for Liz's efforts to help Avery, Jack and Avery plan to give their daughter the middle name Elizabeth. Tracy and Jenna find out that Liz is not pregnant, so she gives them her "pregnancy" photos as her "punishment".

== Reception ==
According to the Nielsen Media Research, this episode of 30 Rock was watched by 4.784 million households in its original American broadcast. It earned a 2.4 rating/6 share in the 18–49 demographic. This means that it was seen by 2.4 percent of all 18- to 49-year-olds, and 6 percent of all 18- to 49-year-olds watching television at the time of the broadcast. The figure was a decrease from the previous episode, Operation Righteous Cowboy Lightning, which was seen by 4.922 million households.

Alan Sepinwall of HitFix described the episode as "uneven but funny-enough" and spoke positively about Ken Howard's performance, but opined that "the Liz/Avery/Vanessa Minillo story was underdeveloped and didn't have a good enough payoff [...] and the only good thing about the Tracy/Jenna subplot was how quickly it got back-burnered."
