= Argus (30 Rock) =

- 30 Rock episode
- Episode no.: Season 4 Episode 19
- Directed by: Jeff Richmond
- Written by: Josh Siegal; Dylan Morgan; Paula Pell
- Production code: 419
- Original air date: April 29, 2010

Guest appearances
- Will Forte as Paul L'Astname; Marceline Hugot as Kathy Geiss; Burke Moses as Thomas

Episode chronology
← Previous "Khonani"	Next → "The Moms"
- 30 Rock season 4

"Argus" is the nineteenth episode of the fourth season of the American television comedy series 30 Rock, and the 77th overall episode of the series. It was written by 30 Rock producers Josh Siegal, Dylan Morgan, and Paula Pell. The episode was directed by co-executive producer and show composer Jeff Richmond. It originally aired on NBC in the United States on April 29, 2010. Guest stars in this episode include Will Forte, Marceline Hugot, and Burke Moses.

In the episode, Jack Donaghy (Alec Baldwin) receives a peculiar gift from the late Don Geiss (Rip Torn). Meanwhile, Liz Lemon (Tina Fey) and Pete Hornberger (Scott Adsit) get suspicious of Jenna Maroney's (Jane Krakowski) new boyfriend (Forte). At the same time, Liz tries to sort out Grizz Griswold's (Grizz Chapman) problem when both Tracy Jordan (Tracy Morgan) and "Dot Com" Slattery (Kevin Brown) want to be Grizz's best man.

"Argus" has received generally positive reception from television critics. According to the Nielsen Media Research, the episode was watched by 5.93 million households during its original broadcast, and received a 2.7 rating/8 share among viewers in the 18–49 demographic.

== Plot ==
Tracy Jordan (Tracy Morgan) announces to The Girlie Show with Tracy Jordan (TGS) staff that Grizz Griswold (Grizz Chapman) will be getting married at the end of the month. A problem immediately ensues after Grizz cannot decide between Tracy and "Dot Com" Slattery (Kevin Brown) to be his best man. Grizz then asks Liz Lemon (Tina Fey) to help him convince Tracy that Dot Com should be his best man. The two suggest another task Tracy can do at the wedding, but Tracy insists on being the best man. Later, Liz learns that Dot Com is in love with Grizz's fiancée, Feyoncé, Grizz is not aware of this, and that the only reason Tracy wanted to be the best man was to protect Dot Com. Finally, after changing his mind about Dot Com as his best man, Grizz appoints Liz as his woman of honor at his wedding instead.

Meanwhile, Liz and Pete Hornberger (Scott Adsit) are suspicious that Jenna Maroney's (Jane Krakowski) new boyfriend Paul (Will Forte) is using her. Pete and Liz follow Paul to a bar and find out that he is a Jenna Maroney impersonator, performing as her in a drag show. The next day, Liz asks Jenna if she knows what Paul does, but Jenna is aware of his work, having met Paul at a Jenna Maroney impersonator contest in which he won and Jenna herself placed fourth. Liz does not approve of the relationship and confronts Paul, asking what his intentions are with Jenna. Paul tells her that he is not using Jenna to further his career, but that he is with her because she accepts him for who he is. Liz is convinced by their touching (although weird) display of care for each other, ultimately approving of their relationship.

At the same time, Jack Donaghy (Alec Baldwin) is informed by Don Geiss's (Rip Torn) estate lawyer Thomas (Burke Moses) that he is in Don Geiss's will. Jack is excited at the idea of owning a piece of Geiss's legacy as Jack considered Geiss his mentor. At the will reading, Jack inherits Geiss's beloved pet peacock named Argus. When Argus begins acting peculiar, Jack enlists the help of NBC page Kenneth Parcell (Jack McBrayer). Kenneth—who knows all the peafowl calls—tells Jack that Argus muttered senpai and kōhai—master and pupil—nicknames that Geiss and Jack had for each other (a ruse conceived by Liz, who knew of the nicknames). Immediately, Jack is convinced that Geiss's soul has inhabited Argus, prompting Jack to release his grief to Argus and finally accepting Geiss's death.

== Production ==
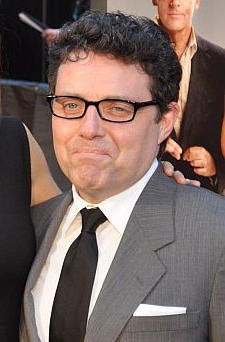
Jeff Richmond (pictured) made his 30 Rock directorial debut with this episode.

"Argus" was written by show producers Dylan Morgan, Paula Pell, and Josh Siegal. The director of this episode was co-executive producer and show composer Jeff Richmond, husband of series creator Tina Fey. This was Morgan, Pell and Siegal's second writing credit, after Morgan and Siegal penned "Sun Tea", and Pell who developed the "Floyd" script. Richmond made his directorial debut in the show with "Argus". This episode of 30 Rock originally aired on NBC in the United States on April 29, 2010, as the nineteenth episode of the show's fourth season and the 77th overall episode of the series. "Argus" was filmed on March 1, 2010.

SNL alum Will Forte made his debut as Jenna Maroney's boyfriend Paul — revealed to be a Jenna impersonator — having guest starred as a different character in the February 1, 2007, episode "Black Tie" in season one. At the end of this episode, Paul, dressed as Jenna, and Jenna sing the song "All by Myself". Forte would appear in the season finale episode "I Do Do" that aired on May 20, 2010. Actress Marceline Hugot returned to play Kathy Geiss, the daughter of former General Electric CEO Don Geiss, played by Rip Torn, for the tenth time. During the reading of her father's will here, Kathy receives a pocket watch with the instructions not to get it wet, though Kathy has already put the watch in her mouth. Actor Burke Moses guest starred as Don Geiss's estate lawyer named Thomas.

During the episode Jack Donaghy inherits Argus, Don Geiss's beloved pet peacock. Throughout the episode, Argus can be seen at Jack's office in the 30 Rock building. An actual peacock was featured here. In one scene, Liz Lemon sees Argus and is frightened of him. While talking to Jack, Argus hits Liz across the face with his feathers, thus marking her as his mate. To accommodate this, puppeteers—Peter Linz, Noel MacNeal, and Carmen Osbahr—were brought in to hit Liz in the face with feathers instead of using the peacock itself.

Throughout the episode, Grizz Griswold alludes that he and Liz had a romantic relationship in the past. In order to choose between Tracy Jordan and Dot Com Slattery as his best man, Grizz turns to Liz for help. After agreeing to help him out, Grizz wonders whether or not it was awkward for Liz that Tracy brought up his wedding, but she asks "Why would it be awkward?", he responds "Because of our sexual past." Afterwards, Grizz says that he and Liz were the "Sam and Diane of this place [TGS]", a reference to the Sam and Diane characters from the television show Cheers. In "Greenzo", that aired in the second season of the series, Liz sexually harasses Grizz at Kenneth Parcell's out of control party, and Kenneth tells Liz off the next day, stating that before that party, he had "never seen Grizz or Dot Com cry." In addition, the Dot Com storyline of him being in love with Grizz's fiancée, Feyoncé, began in the season three episode "St. Valentine's Day".

== Reception ==
According to the Nielsen Media Research, "Argus" was watched by 5.439 million households in its original American broadcast. It earned a 2.7 rating/8 share in the 18–49 demographic, meaning that it was seen by 2.7 percent of all 18- to 49-year-olds, and 8 percent of all 18- to 49-year-olds watching television at the time of the broadcast. This was an increase from the previous episode, "Khonani", which was watched by 5.182 million American viewers. "Argus" won its timeslot in the 18–34 male demographic winning with a 3.2 rating beating the competition by a 1.3 rating.

"I quite enjoyed 'Argus'. It was entertaining, funny and had some killer one-liners from a cast who knows how to make the most of every line. At this point, that's all I'm really looking for from a show that might not live up to its glory days but is still a whole lot of fun."

— Nathan Rabin, The A.V. Club

The A.V. Club's Nathan Rabin enjoyed "Argus", noting that it was "entertaining, funny and had some killer one-liners" and that it featured "all kinds of silly but in a very winning way." Rabin enjoyed all the plots featured here, and praised Will Forte's role as Jenna's boyfriend and impersonator. Emily Exton from Entertainment Weekly wrote that the peacock storyline "felt too silly", and that Forte "was too underused as Paul", nonetheless said that despite not being the greatest 30 Rock episode of all time "there were still some hilarious lines." IGN contributor Robert Canning liked Grizz's dilemma plot, commenting that Grizz not trying to hurt Tracy's feelings while Tracy tried to keep Dot Com away from Grizz's bride-to-be "offered up some inspired lunacy." His only complaint about "Argus" was Jack's plot as he deemed it disappointing. A review in TV Guide by Adam Mersel said "...Fey and the gang live up to the challenge, and produce ['Argus'] a hilarious, quite snotty episode that holds up to any comedy around." Meredith Blake, writing for the Los Angeles Times, was positive towards the episode, reasoning that the writing "is just so deliciously absurd that I can't help but giggle the whole way through", and that the plots featured here were "sublimely inconsequential. Not a whole lot happened, but it was all very funny." Nick Catucci from New York magazine, who did not enjoy the two other stories, appreciated Jenna's, explaining that by having the character date one of her own impersonator was "outrageous and funny without relying on any cheap insults to trannies." Sean Gandert from Paste magazine reported that "Argus" was an episode that "[took] us back to the show's roots", explaining that recapturing the "old tone" also worked to "recapture the old joke-writing expertise. It wasn't 100% consistent, but there were so many good one-liners to counterbalance the misfires that it didn't even matter. This is 30 Rock the way it should be." The Houston Press' Daniel Carlson wrote that Grizz's wedding story was "pure filler, but everything on the show's kind of filler for the wackiness, so it mostly worked." Carlson wrote that the best part from "Argus" came with Forte's Paul as Jenna's boyfriend and impersonator.

Bob Sassone of AOL's TV Squad did not respond well to the episode, observing that "Argus" would go down 30 Rock history as "one of the worst episodes of the series." One of the problems he had was that the Jack character bonded with the peacock for the entire episode. "As I've said before, I hate the episodes where Jack is out of control or acting goofy or involved in some lame pursuit, and this one of the more lame pursuits."
