= Lee Marvin vs. Derek Jeter =

- 30 Rock episode
- Episode no.: Season 4 Episode 17
- Directed by: Don Scardino
- Written by: Kay Cannon; Tina Fey
- Production code: 417
- Original air date: April 22, 2010

Guest appearances
- Elizabeth Banks as Avery Jessup; Will Ferrell as Shane Hunter; Steve Hely as Jerem; Julianne Moore as Nancy Donovan; Ariel Shafir as a man who Liz talks to

Episode chronology
← Previous "Floyd"	Next → "Khonani"
- 30 Rock season 4

"Lee Marvin vs. Derek Jeter" is the seventeenth episode of the fourth season of the American television comedy series 30 Rock, and the 75th overall episode of the series. It was written by co-producer Kay Cannon and series creator Tina Fey. The episode was directed by series producer Don Scardino. It originally aired on NBC in the United States on April 22, 2010. Guest stars in this episode include Elizabeth Banks, Will Ferrell, Steve Hely, Julianne Moore, and Ariel Shafir.

In the episode, Liz Lemon (Fey) starts making an effort to date by attending singles events with her friend Jenna Maroney (Jane Krakowski). At the same time, Jack Donaghy (Alec Baldwin) feels forced to choose between his high school sweetheart, Nancy Donovan (Moore), and news anchor Avery Jessup (Banks). Meanwhile, a racist comment sparks an office-wide debate on affirmative action and leaves James "Toofer" Spurlock (Keith Powell) with a big decision to make regarding his future at the fictitious television series The Girlie Show with Tracy Jordan (TGS).

"Lee Marvin vs. Derek Jeter" received generally positive reviews from television critics. According to the Nielsen ratings system, the episode was watched by 4.216 million households during its original broadcast, and received a 1.9 rating/6 share among viewers in the 18–49 demographic. Kay Cannon and Tina Fey were nominated for a Primetime Emmy Award nomination in the category for Outstanding Writing in a Comedy Series for their work in this episode.

== Plot ==
On the weekend of Jack Donaghy's (Alec Baldwin) 51st birthday, his advances with CNBC host Avery Jessup (Elizabeth Banks) are called into question when he learns that his high school sweetheart, Nancy Donovan (Julianne Moore), has finally been divorced from her husband. Jack spends evenings having dinner and wine with both, against Liz Lemon's (Tina Fey) suggestion that it is a bad idea. He compares Nancy to actor Lee Marvin, after watching a movie marathon starring Marvin, and Avery to baseball player Derek Jeter, after he spends time with Avery at Jeter's home. He is moved by the thoughtful birthday gifts both women give him. Jack is torn between the easygoing, middle-class Nancy and his successful, wealthy counterpart Avery, and does not know whom to choose.

Meanwhile, Liz attends singles activities at the YMCA and her friend, Jenna Maroney (Jane Krakowski), joins her as her wingman. Nancy accompanies Liz to one of the activities, and is concerned when Liz speaks critically of everyone there and rebuffs a man whom Nancy has drawn into conversation. Nancy encourages Liz to focus not on the negative, but on what she does want from a man. Liz tries to follow Nancy's advice the next day at a dodgeball game, and she tells a man (Ariel Shafir), whom she hit in the face during a previous dodgeball game, what traits she wants from a man. However, the man does not speak English, and a disappointed Liz hits him with another ball.

Finally, James "Toofer" Spurlock (Keith Powell) learns he may have been hired as a writer on TGS with Tracy Jordan because of affirmative action and quits. Liz—the show's head writer—is reluctant to rehire him until TGS producer Pete Hornberger (Scott Adsit) reveals to Liz that she is also a beneficiary of affirmative action, having attended college on a Title IX scholarship and having her project The Girlie Show picked up as a mid-season replacement for a misogynistic show that received complaints. When Toofer returns, he demands that no one call him "Toofer" anymore, but when everyone comes up with more insulting nicknames, he gives up.

== Production ==
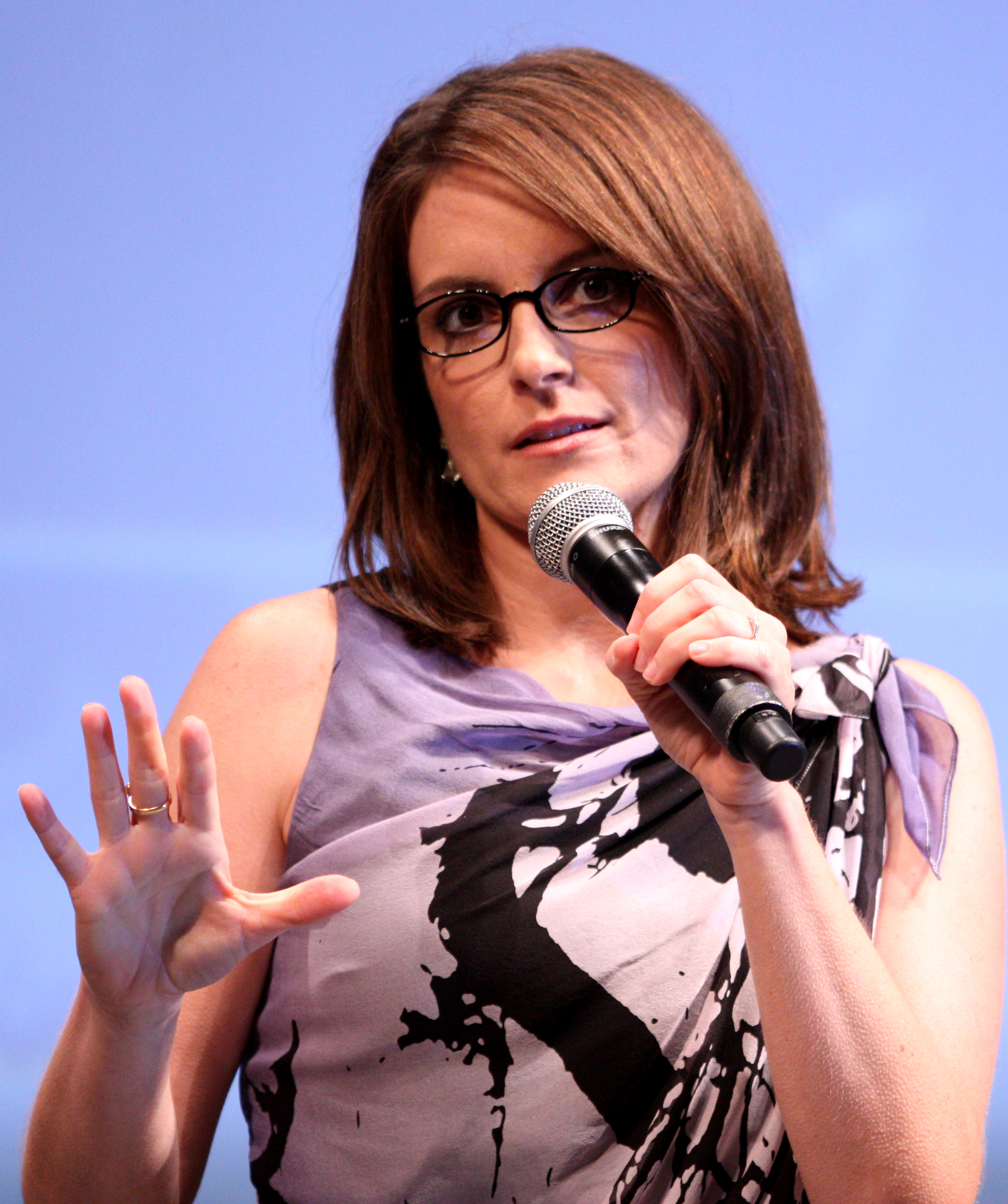
Series creator Tina Fey (pictured) wrote "Lee Marvin vs. Derek Jeter" along with co-writer Kay Cannon.

"Lee Marvin vs. Derek Jeter" was directed by series producer Don Scardino, and written by co-producer Kay Cannon and series creator Tina Fey. This was Cannon and Fey's fourth script collaboration, having written the episodes "Black Tie", "Somebody to Love", and "Christmas Special", for season one, season two, and season three, respectively. "Lee Marvin vs. Derek Jeter" originally aired on NBC in the United States on April 22, 2010, as the seventeenth episode of the show's fourth season and the 75th overall episode of the series.

"Lee Marvin vs. Derek Jeter" was filmed on February 8, 2010. In November 2009, it was announced that actress Julianne Moore would guest star on 30 Rock as a love interest for Alec Baldwin's character, Jack Donaghy. She made her debut as the character Nancy Donovan in the December 10, 2009, episode "Secret Santa", and later guest starred in the episode "Winter Madness". In December 2009, it was confirmed that actress Elizabeth Banks would guest star, and in the February 11, 2010, episode "Anna Howard Shaw Day" she made her debut as Avery Jessup, a CNBC correspondent. Banks later guest starred in the episode "Future Husband". 30 Rock writer and producer Steve Hely appeared in this episode as "Jerem", a man who twice refuses Jenna Maroney's attempts at conversation starters. Keith Powell, who plays Toofer Spurlock, was asked about his reaction towards his storyline in the "Lee Marvin vs. Derek Jeter" script, in which he said "They kind of warned me about that one – I thought it was a really fun thing because Affirmative Action has permeated corporate culture. It didn't freak me out that much".

Comedian actor Will Ferrell had a brief appearance in "Lee Marvin vs. Derek Jeter". In a scene, Pete reveals to Liz that the only reason The Girlie Show—before being renamed to TGS with Tracy Jordan—was green-lighted by NBC was due to criticism from women's groups after the network aired the action drama Bitch Hunter. In a clip, Ferrell, as the character "Shane Hunter", is seen with a gun, entering a woman's bathroom, and shouting "Happy birthday, bitches!" 30 Rock writer Jack Burditt and former co-chairman of NBC Entertainment and Universal Media Studios Ben Silverman are credited as executive producers of this show. Ferrell has appeared in the main cast of Saturday Night Live (SNL), a weekly sketch comedy series which airs on NBC in the United States. Fey was the head writer on SNL from 1999 until 2006. Ferrell would later appear as Shane Hunter in the May 6, 2010, 30 Rock episode "The Moms".

== Cultural references ==
Jenna tells Liz that she wants to accompany her to her singles activities as her wingman since she is up for a role in National Lampoon's Van Wilder's Wingman, Incorporated, a reference to the National Lampoon's Van Wilder film series. Avery and Jack attend a gala opening at a museum, and upon seeing the decorations and well dressed patrons, Avery remarks that "You always know you're at the right party when it feels like the Riddler is about to attack", the Riddler is a comic book villain who leaves behind riddles, puzzles, and word games so that they can be solved. While posing for pictures at the gala, a photographer mistakes Avery for stand-up comedian Chelsea Handler, which has been based on real life experience for Elizabeth Banks, who portrays Avery, as she has been mistaken for Handler. When Liz tells Jack that he cannot date both Avery and Nancy at the same time, she says "Mrs. Doubtfire shimself could not do this", a reference to actor Robin Williams' role in the movie Mrs. Doubtfire, and a scene late in the film in which he alternates between playing two roles in two simultaneous meetings, one as a man, and the other as an older woman named Mrs. Doubtfire.

During their dinner, Avery tells Jack some day he will be as great as a man as former U.S. President Ronald Reagan, to which Jack replies "I do like jelly beans", a reference to Reagan's real-life love of the candy. During one scene of "Lee Marvin vs. Derek Jeter", Tracy Jordan (Tracy Morgan) tells the TGS with Tracy Jordan staff "I know you're all secretly mad, because we finally have a black Disney princess", which is a reference to the 2009 Disney animated film The Princess and the Frog in which the princess character, Tiana, is the first black princess in the Disney Princess franchise. In her speech, Liz says that she wants to be with a man who "will just shut their mouth" when watching the ABC show Lost.

== Reception ==
In its original American broadcast, "Lee Marvin vs. Derek Jeter" was watched by 4.216 million households, according to the Nielsen ratings system. It achieved a 1.9 rating/6 share in the key 18- to 49-year-old demographic. This means that it was seen by 1.9 percent of all 18- to 49-year-olds, and 6 percent of all 18- to 49-year-olds watching television at the time of the broadcast. This was a decrease from the previous episode, "Floyd", which was watched by 6.252 million American viewers. In the 8:30 p.m. timeslot on April 22, in which this episode aired out of its usual timeslot, 30 Rock was outperformed by CBS' reality show Survivor: Heroes vs. Villains, Fox's crime drama Bones, and ABC's FlashForward. Nonetheless, "Lee Marvin vs. Derek Jeter" outperformed The CW's supernatural-fantasy horror program The Vampire Diaries, which drew 3.155 million viewers. Kay Cannon and Tina Fey received a Primetime Emmy Award nomination for Outstanding Writing in a Comedy Series for their work on "Lee Marvin vs. Derek Jeter" at the 62nd Primetime Emmy Awards, but lost it to Modern Family's Steven Levitan and Christopher Lloyd for their work on the pilot episode. The episode received generally positive reviews from television critics.

IGN contributor Robert Canning reported that "Lee Marvin vs. Derek Jeter" was a "stellar episode that was hitting all the right beats", and commented that "[e]ven the tired, formulaic structure of Jack's two women scenario was given some great new lines" from Fey and Cannon, who developed the script. He opined that if the episode centered only around Jack's two-women dilemma it "would have been just fine." Canning appreciated Elizabeth Banks' and Julianne Moore's appearances, writing that the two "exhibited the charms that have made them welcome additions to this season". In conclusion, Canning gave the episode a 9.2 out of 10 rating. Jane Boursaw of AOL's TV Squad said that the Toofer story was "funny, without being (too) offensive." The A.V. Club's Nathan Rabin said that he enjoyed "just about every minute" of this episode, and praised Liz's speech citing it as the "crowning moment" from "Lee Marvin vs. Derek Jeter". Rabin also liked the Toofer quitting storyline writing that it "could easily have gone nowhere but the show made it both funny and surprisingly thoughtful by using it as a springboard to discuss Affirmative Action and our society's defiantly uneven playing field." Time contributor James Poniewozik noted that this episode was stronger than "Khonani", which aired the same day of the week as this episode. Sean Gandert of Paste wrote that Toofer's plot was not "given more than a few minutes of screen time [but] it also doesn't wear out its welcome ... The show doesn't address race, gender, or affirmative action in a particularly enlightened manner, but who cares, it's funny." TV Guide's Adam Mersel wrote that he found the most enjoyment in Liz's story, writing that he found it "endearing". In regards to Jack's plot, Mersel said that Jack is able to play off Nancy and Avery so well that "I am going back and forth on whether or not to scold the NBC boss or give him a pat on the back. Avery and Nancy both have their shining moments, but I feel that he must choose quite soon, or he will be loosing [sic] both."

Will Ferrell's ten second cameo was well-received, with Canning concluding, "...the cherry on the top was discovering that The Girlie Show was only picked up to offset the complaints raised by the series Bitch Hunter. The ten-second clip of this series, with a cameo from Will Ferrell, was phenomenal and I hope the web will soon produce more clips."
