= Khonani =

- 30 Rock episode
- Episode no.: Season 4 Episode 18
- Directed by: Beth McCarthy-Miller
- Written by: Vali Chandrasekaran
- Production code: 418
- Original air date: April 22, 2010

Guest appearances
- Kapil Bawa as Khonani; Subhas Ramsaywack as Subhas

Episode chronology
← Previous "Lee Marvin vs. Derek Jeter"	Next → "Argus"
- 30 Rock season 4

"Khonani" is the eighteenth episode of the fourth season of the American television comedy series 30 Rock, and the 76th overall episode of the series. It was written by co-producer Vali Chandrasekaran and directed by Beth McCarthy Miller. It originally aired on NBC in the United States on April 22, 2010, following shortly after the episode "Lee Marvin vs. Derek Jeter" on the same night. Guest stars in this episode include Kapil Bawa and Subhas Ramsaywack.

In the episode, Jack Donaghy (Alec Baldwin) distracts himself from his romantic problems by attempting to resolve a dispute between two janitors (Bawa and Ramsaywack). Meanwhile, Liz Lemon (Tina Fey) is offended when she learns that her employees hang out outside of work but do not invite her. This episode of 30 Rock closely mirrored the feud between television hosts Jay Leno and Conan O'Brien.

"Khonani" received generally mixed reviews from television critics. According to the Nielsen ratings system, the episode was watched by 5.182 million households during its original broadcast, and received a 2.5 rating/7 share among viewers in the 18–49 demographic.

== Plot ==
Jack Donaghy (Alec Baldwin) distracts himself from his romantic problems involving the choice between CNBC host Avery Jessup (Elizabeth Banks) and his high school sweetheart Nancy Donovan (Julianne Moore) by attempting to resolve a dispute between two janitors, Subhas (Subhas Ramsaywack) and Khonani (Kapil Bawa). Five years ago, Khonani signed a contract to take the 11:30 p.m. janitorial shift from Subhas and informs Jack that he is ready to start at the new time. Jack grants him permission, and calls a meeting with Subhas informing him that Khonani will take over the 11:30 shift. Subhas is not happy with this, so Jack decides to move him to 10:00 p.m., which Subhas has no problem with. As he begins his scheduled shift, Khonani is unhappy with it as there is no trash to pick up because Subhas has already collected it. Khonani complains to Jack about this, resulting in Jack returning Subhas to 11:30, and Khonani leaving NBC to work at Foxwoods Resort Casino.

Meanwhile, Liz Lemon (Tina Fey) is distraught to learn that although her writing staff sometimes hang out after work, they never invite her. She tells Jack—her boss—about this. However, Jack explains that it is best for her to keep her distance from them. Later, Liz's assistant Cerie Xerox (Katrina Bowden) announces that her wedding is back on and that Liz and Jenna Maroney (Jane Krakowski) need to plan a bachelorette party for her. Liz decides to have the party at her apartment and prove to her employees—who are invited—that she can be fun to be with. At the bachelorette party, staff members Pete Hornberger (Scott Adsit), Frank Rossitano (Judah Friedlander), James "Toofer" Spurlock (Keith Powell) and J. D. Lutz (John Lutz) show up, but want to leave as they are not having a good time. Liz gets upset about this, calls them out for not inviting her to hang out with them and demands that they apologize to her.

At the same time, Tracy Jordan (Tracy Morgan) is torn between his commitments to his pregnant wife Angie Jordan (Sherri Shepherd) and his desire to party. He asks NBC page Kenneth Parcell (Jack McBrayer) to assist with any of Angie's needs, but it becomes too much for Kenneth to deal with and he tells Tracy that he needs to be with her instead. Tracy realizes he needs to be with Angie, but changes his mind and goes to a strip club. After returning home and in order to stay there, Tracy decides to wear his dog's shock collar on himself. Tracy then sends Kenneth to take his place at Liz's party. Unbeknownst to Kenneth, Tracy's dog has followed him to the bachelorette party. Kenneth bursts in Liz's home with Tracy's dog right behind him, resulting in the staff hiding from the dog after it attacks them. They all turn to Liz to get rid of the dog, which she at first refuses. She eventually agrees to help them, after they tell her she is a mother figure to them and that nobody wants to go drinking with their mom. Liz finds comfort in this, so she distracts the dog, and the staff exits her apartment unharmed.

== Production ==
"Khonani" was written by 30 Rock co-producer Vali Chandrasekaran and directed by Beth McCarthy-Miller, a long-time television director who worked with series creator Tina Fey on the sketch comedy show Saturday Night Live. This episode was Chandrasekaran's second writing credit, having co-written the "Winter Madness" episode that aired on January 21, 2010. This was McCarthy-Miller's eleventh directed episode. "Khonani" originally aired in the United States on April 22, 2010, on NBC as the eighteenth episode of the show's fourth season and the 76th overall episode of the series.

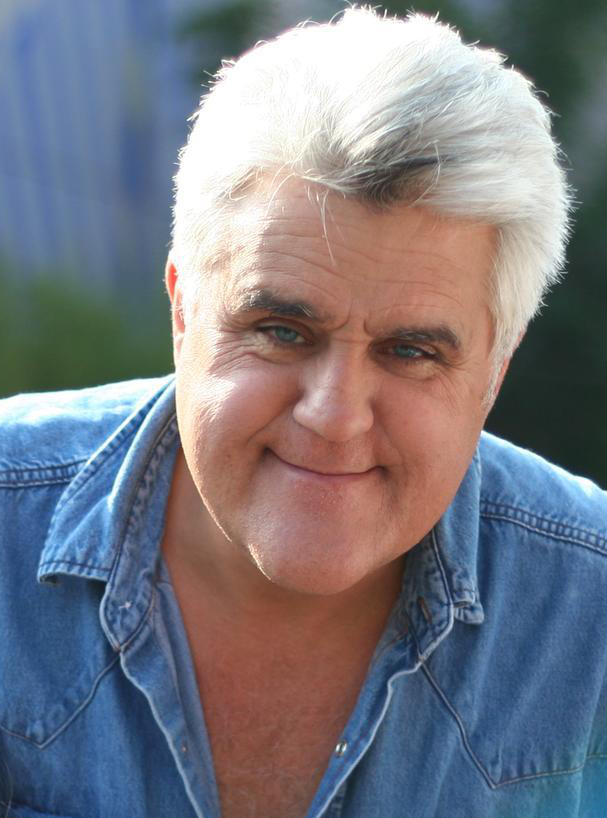
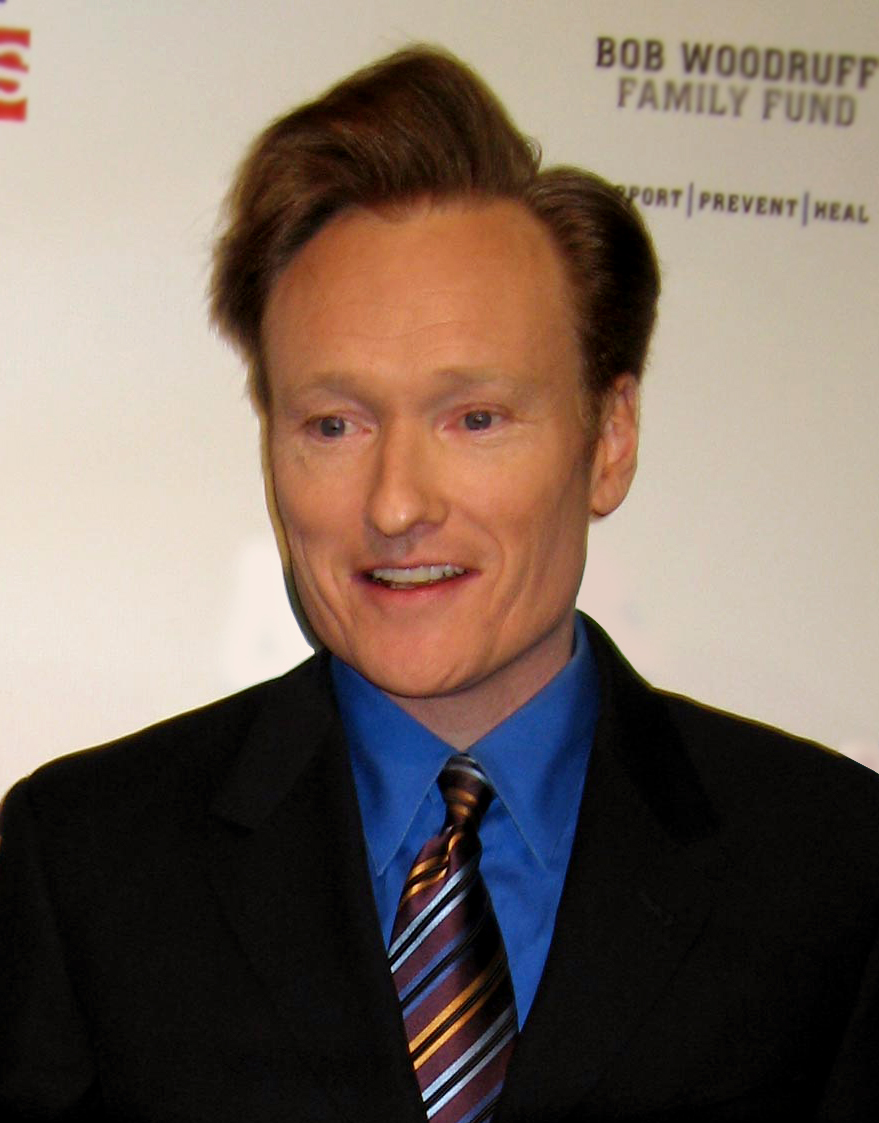
The main plot about the two janitors battling for the late-night shift in this episode of 30 Rock closely mirrored the feud between television hosts Jay Leno (left) and Conan O'Brien (right) over the hosting job of The Tonight Show.

The main plot regarding the two janitors—Subhas and Khonani—battling for the late-night shift at 11:30 p.m. closely mirrored the feud between television hosts Jay Leno and Conan O'Brien over the hosting job of The Tonight Show. Similar to the feud, in this 30 Rock episode, Khonani signed a contract five years ago to take over the 11:30 p.m. from Subhas and asked Jack Donaghy to make it happen, which Jack does. In September 2004, it was announced by the NBC network that Jay Leno would be succeeded by Conan O'Brien in 2009 as host of The Tonight Show. Five years later, Leno would host his final episode of The Tonight Show in May 2009; similarly, Jack informs Subhas that Khonani will take over that shift. Subhas is not thrilled with this, resulting in Jack moving Subhas to the 10:00 shift; O'Brien took over as host of The Tonight Show in June 2009. NBC, afraid of losing Leno to another network, gave him a new nightly prime time series, The Jay Leno Show, which premiered in September 2009 at 10:00 p.m. In "Khonani", as he begins his shift, Khonani is unhappy as there is no trash to pick up as it already has been collected by Subhas. As a result, Subhas goes back to the 11:30 shift, and Khonani leaves NBC to continue his janitorial duties at Foxwoods Resort Casino. The Jay Leno Show debuted to good ratings, however, as the show continued it would garner low ratings, resulting in NBC proposing that the show air at 11:35 p.m. and that The Tonight Show be moved to 12:05. O'Brien, however, rejected the timeslot. In January 2010, O'Brien reached a deal with the network that would see him leave The Tonight Show on January 22, 2010, and two months later Leno returned as host of The Tonight Show on March 1, 2010. In April 2010, O'Brien signed a deal with the cable network TBS to host a new late-night talk show.

Lorne Michaels, who is the executive producer of 30 Rock and who used to produce Late Night with Conan O'Brien, was O'Brien's mentor. Michaels told The Hollywood Reporter in March 2010 that O'Brien would "prevail" from his departure of The Tonight Show. In addition, O'Brien appeared as himself on 30 Rock's first season episode "Tracy Does Conan" that was broadcast on December 6, 2006.

Despite not appearing in the episode, the show made reference of Jack's love triangle storyline with Avery Jessup and Nancy Donovan, played by actresses Elizabeth Banks and Julianne Moore, respectively. This plot was first introduced in the previous episode, "Lee Marvin vs. Derek Jeter". The Jack character's love dilemma would continue throughout the season. Moore was announced as a love interest for Alec Baldwin's television character in November 2009, while Banks' guest spot as a love interest for the Jack character was confirmed in December 2009.

30 Rock executive producer and co-showrunner Robert Carlock was asked in a 2009 interview if Frank Rossitano (Judah Friedlander), Toofer Spurlock (Keith Powell), and J.D. Lutz (John Lutz)—the staff writers of the fictitious show The Girlie Show with Tracy Jordan (TGS)—were going to be seen more in the upcoming season, to which he replied, "One of the great things about this show and the blessing and the curse is that we have so many characters and so many different interactions between characters that work so well. [...] And so, yeah, absolutely because we love those guys". In this episode, Liz Lemon, the head writer for TGS, discovers that Frank, Toofer, and Lutz, along with Pete, do not invite her to hang out with them as they consider her a mother figure.

== Cultural references ==
Jack tells Khonani that every April 22 he honors former United States President Richard Nixon's death by getting drunk and making some unpopular decisions, after Khonani demands to start working at the 11:30 shift as he signed a contract with Jack on April 22, 2005. Cerie says that her wedding is back on after learning that her fiancé was rescued by the A-Team—a fictional group of ex-United States Army Special Forces who work as soldiers of fortune while being on the run from the military—from pirates. Khonani tells Jack that Subhas will want to leave NBC so he can attend to his hobbies of "[collecting] classic car...", Khonani coughs, "cardboard. Classic cardboard." This is a satirical reference to Jay Leno who collects classic cars. Later, after Jack gives back Subhas his original time shift, Khonani says he has a "great job lined up at Fox", Khonani coughs, "...woods. Foxwoods Casino." Following his departure from NBC, reports circulated that the Fox network wanted to hire Conan O'Brien. At the bachelorette party, Jenna sings the 1840s song "Jimmy Crack Corn".

== Reception ==
In its original American broadcast, "Khonani" was watched by 5.182 million households, according to the Nielsen ratings system. It achieved a 2.5 rating/7 share in the key 18- to 49-year-old demographic. This means that it was seen by 2.5 percent of all 18- to 49-year-olds, and 7 percent of all 18- to 49-year-olds watching television at the time of the broadcast. This was an increase from the previous episode, "Lee Marvin vs. Derek Jeter", that aired the same day of the week, which was watched by 4.216 million American viewers.

The episode received generally mixed critical reception. The A.V. Club's Nathan Rabin found the episode less enjoyable than "Lee Marvin vs. Derek Jeter". He explained that when he first learned that the show would tackle the Jay Leno and Conan O'Brien situation "I felt a surge of excitement and optimism. I thought the writers would come up with a smart new angle to attack the imbroglio", but after the airing he noted the janitor plot only hampered the episode. Rabin, however, enjoyed Tracy's actions in the episode, commenting that it "provided a showcase for some great Tracy Morgan non-sequiturs". Emily Exton of Entertainment Weekly also found "Khonani" the weaker of the two episodes, and also believed that the "late-night jokes felt tired". Television columnist Alan Sepinwall of The Star-Ledger disliked the episode, and as a result he noted in his recap that he would remove 30 Rock from the rotation of shows for which he always did detailed reviews. Willa Paskin of New York magazine wrote had the show make reference to the Leno and O'Brien debacle a few months ago "this would have been a cutting-edge satire ... Now, not so much." Jason Hughes of TV Squad remarked that the writing in "Khonani" was sharp, though added that "for some reason" the episode "didn't ring nearly as sharp or funny as many others. I think it was a lot of unfulfilled potential." Sean Gandert of Paste magazine deemed this episode disappointing, but proclaimed "it was still entertaining enough."

James Poniewozik of Time observed, "NBC's public troubles have been 30 Rock's greatest blessing this season, providing it with satiric fodder from The Jay Leno Show to the Comcast acquisition. The show may not be the best sitcom on TV now, but it's definitely the best work of NBC-criticism." In regards to the main plot, he said it "could have done even more with the premise of the Jaypocalypse re-enacted with janitors, but it gets a lot of credit for the inspired idea." IGN contributor Robert Canning gave the episode an 8.3 out of 10 rating, writing that the janitor plot "came at a perfect time" in regards to the Leno and O'Brien controversy. He, however, did not like the other two plots, noting they were "less impressive". Meredith Blake from the Los Angeles Times said that the Khonani and Subhas plot was "supremely clever and self-referential", and that the show's take on it was "decidedly neutral, albeit very funny".
