= Verna (30 Rock) =

- 30 Rock episode
- Episode no.: Season 4 Episode 12
- Directed by: Don Scardino
- Written by: Ron Weiner
- Production code: 412
- Original air date: February 4, 2010

Guest appearance
- Jan Hooks as Verna Maroney

Episode chronology
| ← Previous "Winter Madness" | Next → "Anna Howard Shaw Day" |
- 30 Rock season 4

"Verna" is the twelfth episode of the fourth season of the American television comedy series 30 Rock, and the 70th overall episode of the series. The episode was written by co-executive producer Ron Weiner and directed by series producer Don Scardino. It originally aired on NBC in the United States on February 4, 2010. Former Saturday Night Live cast member Jan Hooks guest stars as the title character of this episode.

In the episode, Jenna Maroney's (Jane Krakowski) mother Verna (Hooks) comes to visit her, and Jenna turns to Jack Donaghy (Alec Baldwin) for help. At the same time, Frank Rossitano (Judah Friedlander) moves in with Liz Lemon (Tina Fey) temporarily, and they both decide to make a pact to give up their bad habits.

"Verna" has received generally positive reception from television critics. According to the Nielsen ratings, the episode was watched by 5.93 million households during its original broadcast, and received a 2.9 rating/8 share among viewers in the 18–49 demographic.

== Plot ==
Jenna Maroney (Jane Krakowski) learns that her mother, Verna (Jan Hooks), has come to visit her. Jenna does not want to see Verna, though, as she knows that her visit will lead to her asking Jenna for money, so Jenna turns to her boss, Jack Donaghy (Alec Baldwin), for help. Jack, who also does not get along with his mother Colleen Donaghy (Elaine Stritch), shows Jenna a presentation on how to deal with overbearing mothers. Jenna attempts to follow the presentation, but Verna surprises her by giving her back the money she has borrowed from Jenna and wanting to be in her life again, leading to Jenna ignoring what Jack has told her and reconciling with Verna, making Jack convinced that Verna has an ulterior motive for making amends with Jenna. Later, his suspicions come true when Verna admits that she sneaked her way back into Jenna's life solely to convince her to star in a reality show featuring them both. Jack tries to let Jenna know Verna's true intentions but cannot bring himself to tell Jenna as she is so happy. Instead, Jack pays Verna off to visit Jenna on a regular basis, letting Jenna believe her mother has changed her ways.

At the same time, Liz Lemon (Tina Fey) takes her staff writer, Frank Rossitano (Judah Friedlander) in as a roommate, and they both decide to make a pact to give up their bad habits: Liz eating junk food and Frank's smoking. As they continue living together, Liz is having a hard time adjusting to not eating junk food and suspects that Frank is still smoking, due to his calm behavior during the situation. To catch him in the act, she decides to hide a recording video camera equipped with night vision in her apartment. The next day, Liz shows the video to her staff writers, including Frank. However, instead of showing Frank smoking cigarettes, the footage shows Liz sleepwalking, "sleepeating," ordering pizza in her sleep, eating large amounts of junk food, and eating the cigarettes. However, it also shows Frank having an affair with a much older cleaning lady, whom he calls "mommy," thus embarrassing them both and breaking the pact.

A subplot involves Pete not being able to have a moment alone at work because of Kenneth continuously talking to him. However, Pete ultimately finds a release by entering a fight club with homeless people and is able to tolerate Kenneth's jabbering.

== Production ==
"Verna" was written by co-executive producer Ron Weiner and directed by series producer Don Scardino. This episode was Weiner's sixth writing credit, having penned "Secrets and Lies", "Señor Macho Solo", "Goodbye, My Friend", "Mamma Mia", and "The Problem Solvers". This was Scardino's twenty-fifth directed episode. "Verna" originally aired in the United States on February 4, 2010, on NBC, as the twelfth episode of the show's fourth season and the 70th overall episode of the series. This episode of 30 Rock was filmed on December 7, 2009.

Comedian-actress Jan Hooks, best known for appearing on Saturday Night Live and 3rd Rock from the Sun, guest-starred as Verna Maroney, the mother of Jenna Maroney, played by Jane Krakowski. She reprised her role as Verna in the May 6, 2010, episode "The Moms". Hooks is eleven years older than Krakowski. Some television commentators have noted that Hooks's appearance on 30 Rock was her first acting job since appearing in the 2004 comedy movie Jiminy Glick in Lalawood.

The episode opens with Liz Lemon having a dream in which she is married to Jack Donaghy and is giving birth to their child. Since its beginning, the series has occasionally hinted at a romantic relationship between Liz and Jack. In one episode, Jack passes Liz off as his live-in girlfriend to his ex-wife to make her jealous. In another episode, Jack's mother tells him that Liz is a perfect match for him, and in the same episode he has Liz listed as his emergency contact. In an April 2010 Esquire interview, series creator Tina Fey said that one of the plots the show will never do is have Liz and Jack get together. "Let me put the Internet at ease: Liz and Jack will never be together." Alec Baldwin was asked if the two characters will ever hook up; he responded "I sincerely doubt it, and I think the show is better off that way. Once they cross that line, all the tension goes out of those relationships. And I think the lesson we learned about both those characters is that they are married to their jobs and they are married to their work."

== Cultural references ==
In the beginning of the episode, Liz dreams she is giving birth to Meat Cat, a fictional cartoon mascot for "Cheesy Blasters", her favorite cheese snacks. This episode made reference to the mascot as it was first introduced in the fourth season's premiere episode "Season 4". Many television reviewers have noted that Jack's presentation on how to deal with overbearing mothers, given the acronym "ASQ" (Always Speak Quietly), was a reference to Baldwin's "ABC" (Always Be Closing) speech seen in the film Glengarry Glen Ross (1992). The night vision video that Liz shows to her writing staff, in which she is seen sleepwalking, ordering a pizza and eating large amounts of junk food, was a parody of the 2009 horror film Paranormal Activity.

== Reception ==
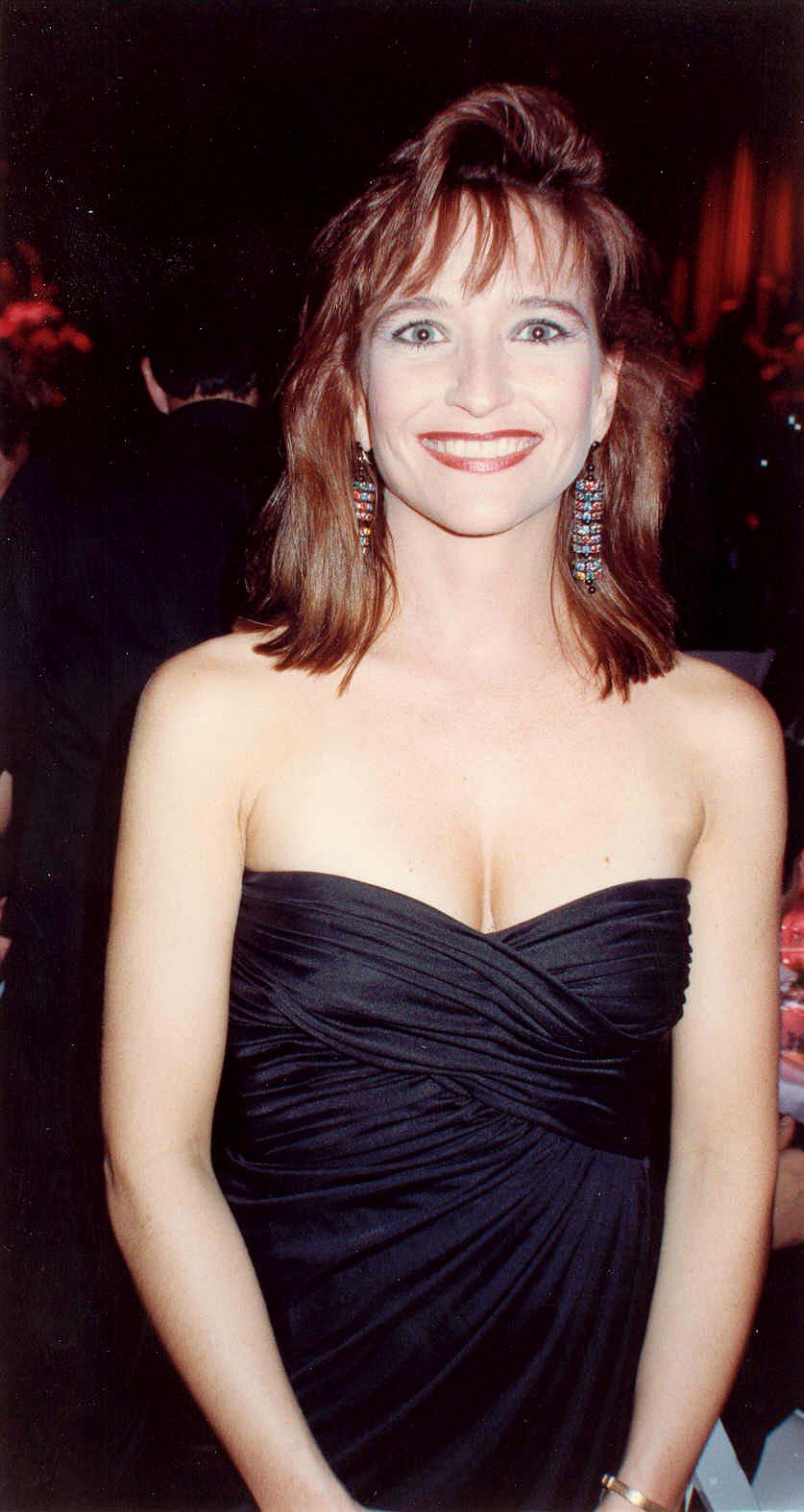
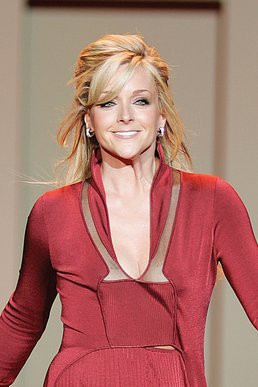
Nick Catucci for New York magazine wrote that for a sitcom, Jan Hooks (left) and Jane Krakowski (right) "actually make for a subtly shaded psychological portrait of mother and child."

According to the Nielsen ratings system, "Verna" was watched by 5.93 million households in its original American broadcast. The rating was a 7 percent increase in viewership from the previous week's episode, "Winter Madness", which was seen by 5.585 million American viewers. The show claimed a 2.9 rating/8 share in the 18–49 demographic, meaning that it was seen by 2.9 percent of all 18- to 49-year-olds, and 8 percent of all 18- to 49-year-olds watching television at the time of the broadcast.

TV Squad's Bob Sassone enjoyed Jan Hooks' appearance, and said that her role as Jenna's mother was "good casting." His only complaint was that this episode had nothing to do with The Girlie Show with Tracy Jordan, the fictional show on 30 Rock, and hoped that no other characters have to stay at Liz's apartment. "Laughter wasn't constant during ['Verna'], but the direction it moved in kept interest even when jokes were sparse. That being said, some of the material ... were pretty great by even the show's lofty standards", said Paste magazine's Sean Gandert. In his recap, Adam Mersel for TV Guide was complimentary, writing it had "spot-on one-liners, witty pop culture references, and a hilarious guest-star in Jan Hooks", and that "Verna" became his favorite episode of the season. Nick Catucci for New York magazine liked Liz and Frank's plot, noting that their bad habits featured here "culminated in the greatest few moments the show has had in some time." The A.V. Club’s Nathan Rabin enjoyed this episode of 30 Rock, writing that the show "was firing on all cylinders. It was good for laughs aplenty but it also helped illuminate Jack's paternal relationship with Jenna, the source of some of Jenna's narcissistic craziness and the full measure of Jack's Oedipal hell." Margaret Lyons for Entertainment Weekly deemed "Verna" a solid episode from the show. Time contributor James Poniewozik enjoyed Hooks' performance, and that it was good to see Jane Krakowski's Jenna "get a story that was not solely about her being an insecure ninny."

Not all reviews were positive. IGN contributor Robert Canning gave the episode a 7.9 out of 10 rating, and said that Hooks' role as Jenna's mother "helped the half hour, but this Jenna-centric episode still didn't blow me away." He noted that the main plot had funny moments but "there wasn't much else to invest in." Overall, Canning reasoned that this episode was very much a stand-alone one "built for some good jokes, and not exactly focused on storytelling. [...] An episode like 'Verna' can still bring a lot of laughs, but you can't help but feel like it's missing that extra something." Television columnist Alan Sepinwall for The Star-Ledger disliked both stories from "Verna", and wrote that it was a disappointing episode, and that it was "pretty weak overall." Meredith Blake, a contributor from the Los Angeles Times, reported that despite Hooks' hilarious performance, the episode still felt a "little bit like filler", and that there "wasn't too much that was especially funny or memorable about it".
