= 30 Rock season 4 =

30 Rock
- Season 4
- DVD cover
- Starring: Tina Fey; Tracy Morgan; Jane Krakowski; Jack McBrayer; Scott Adsit; Judah Friedlander; Alec Baldwin; Katrina Bowden; Kevin Brown; Grizz Chapman; John Lutz; Maulik Pancholy; Keith Powell; Lonny Ross
- No. of episodes: 22

Release
- Original network: NBC
- Original release: October 15, 2009 – May 20, 2010

Season chronology
- ← Previous; Season 3 Next → Season 5

The fourth season of 30 Rock, an American television comedy series, consists of 22 episodes and began airing on October 15, 2009, on the NBC network in the United States. The season was produced by Broadway Video, Little Stranger, and NBC Universal; the executive producers were series creator Tina Fey, Lorne Michaels, Marci Klein, David Miner, and Robert Carlock.

30 Rock is centered on The Girlie Show with Tracy Jordan (TGS), a fictional sketch comedy series, and its head writer Liz Lemon, portrayed by Fey. The series follows Lemon as she juggles her job and her personal life. Early in the season Jack Donaghy (Alec Baldwin) and Liz work to find a new cast member for TGS. The season also sees NBC being purchased by Kabletown, a fictionalized depiction of the acquisition of NBC Universal by Comcast. Additionally, Liz has an ongoing relationship with a man she thought might be her "Future Husband" later in the season.

During the 2009–2010 upfront presentation on May 19, 2009, NBC announced that the show's fourth season, following the precedent set by its third season, would premiere several weeks behind the rest of the network's Thursday night lineup following a multi-week run of Saturday Night Live Weekend Update Thursday specials. On June 25, NBC released its full fall premiere schedule, with 30 Rock returning on October 15, 2009. The fourth season aired under NBC's promotional banner "Comedy Night Done Right" on Thursdays at 9:30 p.m. Eastern Time. The season drew 15 Primetime Emmy Award nominations, down from its previous record breaking totals of 17 and 22 in the second and third seasons, respectively. The season was released on DVD in the United States on September 21, 2010, as a three-disc set.

== Synopsis ==
Season 4 continues with Liz's love advice proving to be a disaster for most of her male co-workers, while she meets someone who could be her love interest (Michael Sheen), despite being reluctant about it. She also attempts to buy an apartment located above hers. Meanwhile, Jack falls for two women and is forced to choose one of them - his high school sweetheart (Julianne Moore), or someone who is similarly successful as him (Elizabeth Banks) while trying to impress the Kabletown executives. Tracy, yearning to be taken more seriously, tries to earn an EGOT while starring in the movie Hard to Watch and Jenna meets a new love interest who is also a straight drag queen (Will Forte) and meets her mother, Verna (Jan Hooks). However, things don't go well for Kenneth as certain events lead to endangering his job as an NBC page.

NBC's purchase by the Philadelphia-based cable company Kabletown, a fictionalized depiction of the acquisition of NBC Universal by Comcast that occurred during the season, becomes a recurring storyline. Fictional GE CEO Don Geiss (Rip Torn) dies. Jack assigns the TGS crew to search for a new cast member; Josh Girard (Lonny Ross) to quit but eventually try and fails to come back. Ultimately, the new cast member is Jack "Danny" Baker (Cheyenne Jackson).

The season culminates in the weddings of Cerie, Floyd, and Grizz, and with Liz dumping her boyfriend Wesley Snipes for pilot Carol Burnett.

== Crew ==
The fourth season was produced by Broadway Video, Little Stranger, Inc., and Universal Media Studios and was aired on the NBC network. The executive producers were series creator Tina Fey, Lorne Michaels, Marci Klein, David Miner, and Robert Carlock. Jack Burditt, Matt Hubbard, Jeff Richmond, John Riggi, and Ron Weiner acted as co-executive producers. The producers for the season were Alec Baldwin, Jerry Kupfer, Paula Pell, and Don Scardino with Diana Schmidt, Irene Burns, and Kay Cannon as co-producers.

There were eight directors through the season, two of which—series producer Scardino and Beth McCarthy-Miller—directed multiple episodes. There were six directors who each directed a single episode of the season: Riggi, Gail Mancuso, Ken Whittingham, Stephen Lee Davis, Millicent Shelton, and Richmond. Writers credited with episodes in the fourth season included Fey, Carlock, Riggi, Hubbard, Weiner, Dylan Morgan & Josh Siegal, Jon Haller & Tracey Wigfield, Burditt, and Pell.

== Cast ==
Tina Fey portrayed Liz Lemon, the head writer of a fictitious live-sketch-comedy television series TGS. The TGS cast consists of two main actors. The lead actor is the loose cannon movie star Tracy Jordan, portrayed by Tracy Morgan. His co-star is the extremely narcissistic Jenna Maroney, portrayed by Jane Krakowski. Josh Girard, portrayed by Lonny Ross, was a cast member in previous seasons but quit TGS in "Season 4". Jack "Danny" Baker (Cheyenne Jackson) is a new cast member hired during the season to replace Girard. Jack McBrayer played the naïve NBC page Kenneth Parcell. Scott Adsit acted as the witty and wise TGS producer, Pete Hornberger. Judah Friedlander portrayed trucker hat-wearing staff writer Frank Rossitano. Alec Baldwin played the NBC network executive Jack Donaghy. Donaghy's full corporate title for the majority of the season is "Head of East Coast Television and Microwave Oven Programming". Keith Powell played the Harvard University alumnus and TGS staff writer James "Toofer" Spurlock. Katrina Bowden acted as writers' assistant Cerie Xerox. Other cast members include, Maulik Pancholy as Jonathan, Grizz Chapman as Grizz Griswold, Kevin Brown as "Dot Com" Slattery, and John Lutz as J.D. Lutz.

The show regularly features guest stars. Steve Buscemi plays private investigator Lenny Wosniak, while Will Arnett acts as Devon Banks, Jack's enemy. Cheyenne Jackson guest starred in this season as Danny Baker, the new cast member on TGS. Fey had seen Jackson in the Broadway musicals Xanadu and Damn Yankees, the latter starred Jane Krakowski. Fey set up a meeting with Jackson to interest him in a role on the program with him accepting. Bobb'e J. Thompson and Sherri Shepherd returned as Tracy Jr. and Angie Jordan, respectively, the son and wife of Tracy Jordan. Dr. Leo Spaceman was played by Chris Parnell. Julianne Moore and Elizabeth Banks appeared as Nancy Donovan and Avery Jessup, respectively, as love interests for Jack. Jan Hooks acts as Verna Maroney, Jenna's mother. Jon Hamm, Jason Sudeikis, and Dean Winters reprised their roles as Drew Baird, Floyd DeBarber, and Dennis Duffy, respectively, as former boyfriends of Liz. Michael Sheen portrays Wesley Snipes, a man who believes that he and Liz are destined for each other. Anita Gillette, Patti LuPone, and Elaine Stritch played Margaret Lemon, Sylvia Rossitano, and Colleen Donaghy, respectively, the mothers of Liz, Frank, and Jack, respectively. Matt Damon's character Carol is introduced as a love interest in the season finale.

=== Main cast ===
- Tina Fey as Liz Lemon, the head writer of TGS, a live sketch comedy television show. (22 episodes)
- Tracy Morgan as Tracy Jordan, a loose cannon movie star and cast member of TGS. (22 episodes)
- Jane Krakowski as Jenna Maroney, a vain, fame-obsessed TGS cast member and Liz's best friend. (22 episodes)
- Jack McBrayer as Kenneth Parcell, a naïve, television-loving NBC page from Georgia. (22 episodes)
- Scott Adsit as Pete Hornberger, the witty and wise producer of TGS. (17 episodes)
- Judah Friedlander as Frank Rossitano, an immature staff writer for TGS. (20 episodes)
- Alec Baldwin as Jack Donaghy, a high-flying NBC network executive and Liz's mentor. (22 episodes)
- Katrina Bowden as Cerie Xerox, the young, attractive TGS general assistant. (11 episodes)
- Keith Powell as James "Toofer" Spurlock, a proud African-American staff writer for TGS. (15 episodes)
- Lonny Ross as Josh Girard, a young, unintelligent TGS cast member. (2 episodes)
- Kevin Brown as Walter "Dot Com" Slattery, a member of Tracy's entourage. (14 episodes)
- Grizz Chapman as Warren "Grizz" Griswold, a member of Tracy's entourage. (12 episodes)
- Maulik Pancholy as Jonathan, Jack's assistant who is obsessed with him. (9 episodes)
- John Lutz as J.D. Lutz, a lazy, overweight TGS writer who is often ridiculed by his co-workers. (16 episodes)

=== Recurring cast ===
- Sue Galloway as Sue LaRoche-Van der Hout, a TGS writer from the Netherlands. (8 episodes)
- Elizabeth Banks as Avery Jessup, the host of NBC's political talk show The Hot-Box and love interest for Jack. (6 episodes)
- Cheyenne Jackson as Danny Baker, a new TGS cast member. (6 episodes)
- John Anderson as Astronaut Mike Dexter, Liz's fantasy boyfriend. (5 episodes)
- Julianne Moore as Nancy Donovan, Jack's high school crush from Boston. (5 episodes)
- Marceline Hugot as Kathy Geiss, Don Geiss' socially awkward middle-aged daughter. (4 episodes)
- Michael Sheen as Wesley Snipes, an Englishman who starts dating Liz. (4 episodes)
- Jason Sudeikis as Floyd DeBarber, Liz's former boyfriend. (4 episodes)
- Subhas Ramsaywack as Subhas, a janitor at 30 Rockefeller Plaza. (3 episodes)
- Will Arnett as Devon Banks, a government employee and Jack's nemesis. (2 episodes)
- Will Ferrell as Shane Hunter, the fictional protagonist in the television show Bitch Hunter. (2 episodes)
- Will Forte as Paul L'astnamé, Jenna's boyfriend who is also a Jenna Maroney impersonator. (2 episodes)
- Jon Hamm as Dr. Andrew "Drew" Baird, a pediatrician and Liz's ex-boyfriend. (2 episodes)
- Jan Hooks as Verna Maroney, Jenna's manipulative mother. (2 episodes)
- Chris Parnell as Dr. Leo Spaceman, a physician who practices questionable medical techniques. (2 episodes)
- James Rebhorn as Dr. Kaplan, a dentist. (2 episodes)
- Brian Williams as himself (2 episodes)
- Dean Winters as Dennis Duffy, Liz's immature ex-boyfriend. (2 episodes)

=== Guest stars ===
- Buzz Aldrin as himself (Episode: "The Moms")
- Jon Bon Jovi as himself (Episode: "Anna Howard Shaw Day")
- Steve Buscemi as Lenny Wosniak, a private investigator hired by Jack. (Episode: "Season 4")
- Matt Damon as Carol Burnett, a pilot and love interest for Liz. (Episode: "I Do Do")
- Jeff Dunham as Rick Wayne (Episode: "Stone Mountain")
- Jimmy Fallon as himself (Episode: "Stone Mountain")
- James Franco as himself (Episode: "Klaus and Greta")
- Kathie Lee Gifford as herself (Episode: "Floyd")
- Anita Gillette as Margaret Lemon, Liz's mother. (Episode: "The Moms")
- Whoopi Goldberg as herself (Episode: "Dealbreakers Talk Show #0001")
- Al Gore as himself (Episode: "Sun Tea")
- Gilbert Gottfried as himself (voice role) [Episode: "Audition Day"]
- Hoda Kotb as herself (Episode: "Floyd")
- Lester Holt as himself (Episode: "Floyd")
- Padma Lakshmi as herself (Episode: "The Problem Solvers")
- Matt Lauer as himself (Episode: "Klaus and Greta")
- Shawn Levy as Scottie Shofar, a television producer. (Episode: "The Problem Solvers")
- Patti LuPone as Sylvia Rossitano, Frank's stereotypical Italian-American mother. (Episode: "The Moms")
- Novella Nelson as herself (Episode: "The Moms")
- Paula Pell as Paula Hornberger, Pete's wife. (Episode: "Season 4")
- Alysia Reiner as Real Estate Agent (Episode: "Sun Tea")
- Horatio Sanz as Maynard Roger Hoynes, Jenna's stalker. (Episode: "Anna Howard Shaw Day")
- Martin Scorsese as himself (voice role) [Episode: "Audition Day"]
- Sherri Shepherd as Angie Jordan, Tracy's no-nonsense wife. (Episode: "Dealbreakers Talk Show #0001")
- Elaine Stritch as Colleen Donaghy, Jack's cold and overbearing mother. (Episode: "The Moms")
- Christopher Walken as himself (voice role) [Episode: "Audition Day"]
- Jack Welch as himself (Episode: "Future Husband")
- Betty White as herself (Episode: "Stone Mountain")
- Larry Wilcox as himself (Episode: "Secret Santa")
- Meredith Viera as herself (Episode: "Floyd")

== Episodes ==
No. overall	No. in season	Title	Directed by	Written by	Original release date	Prod. code	U.S. viewers (millions)
59	1	"Season 4"	Don Scardino	Tina Fey	October 15, 2009	401	6.39
Jack takes steps to stop what he perceives as elitist developments at TGS, which he believes to be detrimental to the show's future in a difficult economic climate. He suggests Jenna change her image by "going country"; and that Tracy reconnects with his roots. In addition, Jack sends Liz on a search for a new actor to join the TGS cast. She recruits Pete to help her look for new talent and the pair keep their search private. Eventually they reveal to the cast and crew they are looking for a new actor; which angers the current cast and crew. Meanwhile, Kenneth and Jack have a dispute over timecards which results in Kenneth accidentally receiving a large bonus check of Jack's instead of his own paycheck. Kenneth grows angry over the bonus and leads a page strike. Jack hires private detective Lenny Wosniak (Steve Buscemi) to try to end the strike, but he fails. Finally, Jack admits to Kenneth that he is a "big ol' liar" and Kenneth ends the strike.
60	2	"Into the Crevasse"	Beth McCarthy Miller	Robert Carlock	October 22, 2009	402	6.84
The male employees of TGS are angry with Liz for damage done to their personal relationships due to Dealbreakers, an advice book she wrote. Tracy's wife Angie (Sherri Shepherd) kicks him out of the house over things she reads in Liz's book, and he moves in with Liz as revenge. During his stay with Liz, Tracy reads the book in detail and discovers that much of the book was written directly about him. To resolve their conflict, Jack decides that, because Liz ruined Tracy's life with her book, Tracy should be given the right to ruin her life, and he orders Liz to sign over her life rights to Tracy, which she does. She suggests that Tracy make a pornographic film based on her life which he agrees to and decides to move out of Liz's apartment. At the same time, Jack faces Congressional hearings on the microwave industry and is surprised to find Devon Banks (Will Arnett) has begun working for the government. Devon threatens to ruin Jack's career and Jack acts quickly to try to redesign the microwave to make the division profitable again but he abandons the project as a failure. Instead, Jack convinces Devon to give the company bailout money effectively making Devon Jack's boss.
61	3	"Stone Mountain"	Don Scardino	John Riggi	October 29, 2009	403	6.10
Jack and Liz travel to Kenneth's home town of Stone Mountain, Georgia to continue their quest for an actor that fits Jack's beliefs of what will appeal to "middle America". Jack visits the local comedy club and finds the act of Rick Wayne (Jeff Dunham) and his dummy Pumpkin (Bubba J) to be hilarious and demands that he be hired. Not thrilled at the idea of hiring Wayne and his dummy Liz decides to see them at the club and heckle them. Once there, Pumpkin begins insulting Liz repeatedly, prompting Jack to destroy the dummy. At the same time, Jenna, worried that her position on the show will be diminished with the casting of a new actor, decides to befriend Frank, Toofer, and Lutz, to ensure her continued success. The three are initially annoyed by her presence until they learn from Cerie that women get very wild and drunk at "gay Halloween parties". They decide to pretend to be Jenna's friend to get into such a party. She invites them to the party under the condition they will not "forget" her when the actor is hired. Meanwhile, after two other celebrities die Tracy fears for his life when he hears that celebrities tend to die in groups of three. He is relieved when he learns that Pumpkin "died".
62	4	"Audition Day"	Beth McCarthy Miller	Matt Hubbard	November 5, 2009	404	6.15
Liz and Pete have found an actor (Nick Fondulis) they want on TGS To ensure his selection by Jack, they rig the audition by including bad actors. Tracy and Jenna learn of Liz and Pete's scheme and decide to look for an actor of their own to sabotage the auditions. Meanwhile, Jack becomes inflicted with bedbugs which results in him getting ostracized by everyone at 30 Rockefeller Plaza. Feeling passionate, Jack tells Liz to give everyone a chance to audition, after catching her trying to eliminate people from the audition process. After the auditions are over, Liz learns that the actor she wanted on the show faked his credentials. She discovers that his references—Gilbert Gottfried, Martin Scorsese, and Christopher Walken—were not legitimate and that he impersonated them. Liz tries to stop Jack from hiring him, but instead Jack hires a robot street performer.
63	5	"The Problem Solvers"	John Riggi	Ron Weiner	November 12, 2009	405	6.00
Jack offers Liz a chance to create a television pilot based on her "Dealbreakers" sketch. She is initially excited, but Tracy and Jenna convince her to look for other offers before agreeing to work with Jack. She hires an agent (Josh Fadem) and displeased with her decision, Jack announces that NBC is moving forward with the pilot's production and calls in television host Padma Lakshmi as Liz's replacement. Liz threatens to sue Jack and NBC for the rights to "Dealbreakers", but Jack informs her that NBC owns the rights to it. During their respective meetings, the two realize that they should work with one another. They make amends and agree to create the pilot together. Meanwhile, the new cast member, Jack "Danny" Baker (Cheyenne Jackson), the robot street performer, arrives on set and learns the intricacies of TGS. Danny treats Kenneth politely and does not ask him to run any errands for him which leads Tracy and Jenna to question their demanding ways, resulting in the two asking less of Kenneth which upsets him. Kenneth asks Danny to yell at him more. Danny, who is Canadian, has had a hard time pronouncing the word "about", but after yelling at Kenneth, and saying "about" without an accent, thanks Kenneth for helping him. In addition, after giving Liz advice, Tracy and Jenna solve other problems of the TGS cast and crew.
64	6	"Sun Tea"	Gail Mancuso	Josh Siegal & Dylan Morgan	November 19, 2009	406	5.72
Jack puts Kenneth in charge of reducing TGS's carbon footprint during NBC's annual Green Week. Kenneth goes around 30 Rockefeller Plaza and informs everyone to be more environmentally conscious. He tells everyone that Frank's habits, including peeing in bottles, while disgusting, are actually environmentally friendly. Meanwhile, Liz learns that her apartment building is being converted into a condominium and that she must purchase her apartment or face a rent increase. She decides that she wants to buy her apartment and the one above her, and turn them into her dream home. She decides to bribe the resident (Nate Corddry) above her out of the apartment but he will not be bribed out, so the two decide to live together in his apartment. Liz fails to drive him out with her crazed behavior so she resorts to adopting Frank's behavior to force him to leave, which is successful. At the same time, Jack and Tracy reevaluate fatherhood with the two deciding to get a vasectomy operation. Jack, however, discovers the respect Tracy's son (Bobb'e J. Thompson) has for Tracy and decides not to go through with the procedure. After being put under, Tracy realizes his life is horrible because he does not have a daughter but two sons. Jack is able to stop Dr. Leo Spaceman (Chris Parnell) from conducting the procedure.
65	7	"Dealbreakers Talk Show #0001"	Don Scardino	Kay Cannon	December 3, 2009	407	6.08
Jack and Liz prepare for the beginning of Liz's new talk show, Dealbreakers. In her absence at the TGS writers room, Liz appoints Frank as the head writer. Frank accepts the role, however, as the day progresses he begins to act and dress like Liz. Later, Jack receives a call from Devon who threatens him if Liz's talk show loses any amount of money. This puts Jack on edge with him interfering with Liz's appearance, sending her over the edge with insecurity. After Liz locks herself in her dressing room, Jack shuts the Dealbreakers production down, but manages to break even by selling the show's opening titles. Meanwhile, Tracy shops for a special Christmas present for Angie to try to convince her to have another child, instead he finds a diamond encrusted "EGOT" necklace and sets a new life goal to win four awards: an Emmy, a Grammy, an Oscar, and a Tony (an accomplishment known as an EGOT) with a song that gets featured on a television show, then a movie based on the television show, and then a musical based on that movie. After failing to combine five popular musical styles into one song, he sings his song to Angie and she is so moved she agrees to have another child.
66	8	"Secret Santa"	Beth McCarthy Miller	Tina Fey	December 10, 2009	408	6.70
Jack and Liz decide to exchange gifts for Christmas that cost them no money. At the same time, Jack reconnects with Nancy Donovan (Julianne Moore), a woman Jack had feelings for while in high school. He ponders on the possibility of a romance with Nancy as he discovers that her marriage is falling apart. Later, Jack and Liz exchange their gifts; he gets her a program from her performance of The Crucible framed in wood from her high school stage. For her gift, Liz calls in a bomb threat to Penn Station, keeping Nancy in New York, and in return Jack fulfills Liz's dream of meeting actor Larry Wilcox. Pete tries to get back at Jenna for not contributing money to the cleaning ladies by giving Danny Jenna's solo for the Christmas episode. Not wanting to overshadow her, Danny ends up doing a duet with Jenna and sings off-key to make Jenna look good. Kenneth throws his annual "Secret Santa Fun Swap", much to Frank, Toofer, and Lutz's chagrin. The three, not wanting to take part, make-up a religion which they claim does not allow them to celebrate Christmas. Tracy, however, tells Kenneth that they made up the religion prompting Kenneth to believe that all religions are made up by man. His faith is restored when the three are arrested for the bomb threat Liz called in using their phone.
67	9	"Klaus and Greta"	Gail Mancuso	Robert Carlock	January 14, 2010	409	5.12
Following an out-of-control New Year's Eve party, in which Jack left a drunken message on Nancy's answering machine, Jack decides to break into her house with Kenneth to erase the message while Nancy is on vacation. At her home, Jack finds evidence that Nancy's marriage is reaching its end. They eventually play the message in which Jack reminisces about their times in high school German class. Jack had the name "Klaus" and Nancy had the name "Greta". He decides not to erase the message, but Kenneth does so anyway. When they return, Kenneth realizes that Nancy's voicemail code stands for "Klaus", which means that Nancy does have feelings for Jack. Jenna enters a fake relationship with actor James Franco in order to counteract rumors that he is in love with a Japanese body pillow. She begins to fall in love with Franco but realizes that he is not in love with her and ends their relationship. Liz accidentally outs her cousin (Jeffrey Self) at her New Year's Eve party, so he decides to live with her in New York. While out together, Liz runs into Franco and his pillow. The two get drunk and end up sleeping together. The next morning, at Liz's apartment, her cousin decides to leave New York and go back home after seeing Franco and his body pillow.
68	10	"Black Light Attack!"	Don Scardino	Steve Hely	January 14, 2010	410	4.98
Danny tells Jack he is having an office romance but will not disclose the woman's name. Jack asks Danny more about the woman and Danny reveals details about her resulting in Jack figuring out that Danny is seeing Liz. Unhappy about this, Jack orders Liz to end the relationship. She tries to break if off with him but changes her mind. Later, Jack learns that Liz is still seeing Danny and knowing she will not end it, Jack "confides" in Danny that he has been in love with Liz ever since he met her. Danny agrees to break up with Liz to preserve his new friendship with Jack. Meanwhile, Jenna thinks she is auditioning for a role on Gossip Girl as a college freshman; but finds out that she is actually being considered for the role of the freshman's mother. She panics and decides to act young which makes her a target of ridicule with the TGS staff. Jenna, however, accepts the role of the mother on Gossip Girl and receives an ovation for her performance. At the same time, Tracy decides to add a woman to his entourage so he can gain more learning experience with women when he and Angie have a daughter. He brings in TGS writer Sue Laroche-Van der Hout (Sue Galloway). He treats Sue as his child and soon she starts rebelling against him. Tracy tells Sue that all he wanted was to be a father figure to her.
69	11	"Winter Madness"	Beth McCarthy Miller	Vali Chandrasekaran & Tom Ceraulo	January 21, 2010	411	5.54
Liz and Pete decide to take the staff south to Miami for a week, due to their hatred of the cold weather. They tell Jack about the trip which he approves; but instead of Miami he takes them farther north to Boston so he can see Nancy. He learns that Nancy's husband has left her but she refuses to ask for a divorce. Jack admits his true feelings to Nancy but she tells him that they should place their relationship on hold. Meanwhile, the staff blame Liz for all their problems and their hatred of Boston. She comes up with a fake individual named "Dale Snitterman" and tells them it is all his fault for all their misfortunes, not realizing until later that she had seen the name somewhere and did not make it up. At that point, the staff finds Snitterman (Ray Bokhour) and harass him.
70	12	"Verna"	Don Scardino	Ron Weiner	February 4, 2010	412	5.79
Jenna learns that her mother Verna (Jan Hooks) has come to visit her. Not wanting to see her as she knows this will lead for Verna to ask for money, Jenna turns to Jack for help. Jack, who also does not get along with his mother Colleen (Elaine Stritch) shows Jenna a presentation on how to deal with overbearing mothers. Jenna, however, reconciles with her mother. Jack believes that Verna has an ulterior motive for making amends with Jenna. His suspicions are true when Verna admits that she made amends with Jenna solely to convince her to star in a reality show featuring them both. Jack pays Verna off to visit Jenna on a regular basis to make her daughter happy. Meanwhile, Frank moves in with Liz temporarily and the pair decide to make a pact to give up their bad habits: Liz's eating junk food and Frank's smoking. Liz has a hard time adjusting to not eating junk food, and suspects that Frank is still smoking, due to his calm behavior. She decides to hide a recording video camera equipped with night vision in her apartment. The next day, Liz watches the video, however, the footage shows her sleepwalking and eating large amounts of junk food, thus breaking the pact.
71	13	"Anna Howard Shaw Day"	Ken Whittingham	Matt Hubbard	February 11, 2010	413	6.00
Liz schedules a needed root canal on Valentine's Day to avoid feeling lonely on the holiday. She realizes she will need someone to escort her home from the dentist's office due to the after effects of anaesthesia. She asks her colleagues for a ride home, but they cannot do it. Meanwhile, Jack meets a successful and attractive CNBC host named Avery Jessup (Elizabeth Banks) and ponders the possibility of having a relationship with her as he realizes that Nancy will not get divorced. They eventually embark on a number of both successful and unsuccessful dates. Elsewhere, Jenna is saddened that her stalker (Horatio Sanz) loses interest in her as he was the longest relationship she has ever had. Liz goes to her appointment and after her surgery she reassures the staff that the anaesthesia is having no effect on her and can take herself home. Liz sees her former boyfriends Drew Baird (Jon Hamm), Dennis Duffy (Dean Winters), and Floyd DeBarber (Jason Sudeikis) but in fact is hallucinating and mistakes the three for the three women dental assistants. One of them calls Jack asking if he could come pick up Liz and take her home, which he does.
72	14	"Future Husband"	Don Scardino	Tracey Wigfield & Jon Haller	March 11, 2010	414	5.77
Liz finds a mysterious number in her phone under the name "Future Husband" and learns that she met this individual in her dentist's recovery office and decides to search for him. The two eventually meet and arrange a date. The man's name is Wesley and on their date they fail to hit it off. Liz and Wesley see each other again and decide to go on another date. Meanwhile, Jack's aspirations of becoming CEO of General Electric (GE) comes to a halt when rumors circulate that Philadelphia-based cable company Kabletown will be purchasing NBC. He learns from former GE chairman Jack Welch that current GE CEO Don Geiss (Rip Torn) had died and the company negotiated a takeover with Kabletown. Elsewhere, Tracy stages a one-man show in an attempt to win a Tony award as part of his EGOT journey. His show is a success but later learns that in order to qualify for the award he must do his show eight times. Jenna helps Tracy and tries to teach him the principles of acting. This leads nowhere, resulting in the two arguing and Jenna telling him he can go do his show and read the phone book for all she cares. At his show, Tracy reads the phone book making Jenna very proud of him.
73	15	"Don Geiss, America and Hope"	Stephen Lee Davis	Jack Burditt & Tracey Wigfield	March 18, 2010	415	6.79
Jack tries to learn everything about Kabletown and find a way he can contribute. He is shocked to learn that Kabletown runs pay-per-view adult channels and is horrified at the prospect of no longer making things. Jack has an epiphany and proposes to Kabletown executives that they produce "porn for women", channels featuring attractive men who "listen" while women blather on. Meanwhile, Liz and Wesley continuously run into each other. Wesley believes they are meant to be together as they continue running into each other. The pair soon come to terms that the anaesthesia is the cause of whatever they went through and agree to stop seeing each other. Later, when they run into each other again, Wesley states they should probably just settle for each other which horrifies Liz. Elsewhere, Tracy's nanny writes a tell-all book, revealing that Tracy has been faithful to Angie. In order to restore his womanizing persona, Tracy announces to the media that he is leaving show business to spend more time with a stripper, but no one buys it. In addition, women come forward and admit that they did not have sex with Tracy. He decides to sleep with Liz but she refuses. She tells him that he should be happy with the life he has.
74	16	"Floyd"	Millicent Shelton	Paula Pell	March 25, 2010	416	6.25
Liz hopes she can reconcile with Floyd but discovers that he is getting married. Liz invites Floyd to a restaurant and while there Floyd gets drunk. The next day, Floyd appears on The Today Show with his fiancée (Kristin McGee) still drunk. Later, Liz apologizes to both Floyd and his fiancée for getting him drunk. They accept the apology, and she asks Liz to be a participant in their wedding, to which she agrees. Jack and Danny team up against Frank, Toofer, and Lutz in a prank war after the three printed an embarrassing interview with Danny. Jack and Danny trick the three into stripping in front of the TGS dancers. Later, the three discover a secret code from a prank society that Jack belonged to. Frank realizes he can use this to manipulate him, which works. Jack threatens to sleep with Frank's mother Sylvia (Patti LuPone) which prompts them to ease off on their pranks. As a result of Kenneth's anecdotes, Tracy and Jenna are haunted by Kenneth in their dreams. To stop this, the two decide to deal with it à la A Nightmare on Elm Street by killing Kenneth in their dreams. They wake up—believing they are still dreaming—and actually attack Kenneth. The two later realize that they slept through the night without having any dreams of Kenneth. They apologize to Kenneth and he accepts their apology.
75	17	"Lee Marvin vs. Derek Jeter"	Don Scardino	Kay Cannon & Tina Fey	April 22, 2010	417	4.00
Jack questions his relationship with Avery when he learns that Nancy has finally divorced her husband. He spends an evening having dinner and wine with each of them, torn between the two and unable to decide whom to be with. Meanwhile, Liz attends singles' activities at the YMCA and brings Nancy along. Nancy tells Liz to focus on what she wants in a man. Liz takes the advice the next day at a dodgeball game and tells a man (Ariel Shafir) what traits she wants from a man, though he does not speak English. Finally, Toofer learns he may have been hired as a writer because of affirmative action and quits in anger. Liz is reluctant to rehire him at first. However, Pete reveals that she was also hired as a result of affirmative action and she rehires him.
76	18	"Khonani"	Beth McCarthy Miller	Vali Chandrasekaran	April 22, 2010	418	5.16
Jack distracts himself from his romantic problems by attempting to resolve a dispute between two janitors, Subhas (Subhas Ramsaywack) and Khonani (Kapil Bawa). Years earlier, Khonani signed a contract to take the 11:30 p.m. janitorial shift from Subhas and informs Jack that he is ready to start. Jack grants him permission, and moves Subhas to 10:00 p.m. Khonani is unhappy with his new shift as there is no trash to pick up because Subhas has already collected it. As a result, Khonani leaves NBC and Subhas goes back to 11:30. Meanwhile, Liz is distraught that her writing staff hang out after work and they do not invite her. She hosts Cerie's bachelorette party at her apartment and confronts the staff for not inviting her to hang out with them. Tracy is torn between his commitments to his pregnant wife and his desire to party. To stay at home he decides to wear his dog's shock collar. Tracy orders Kenneth to take his place at Liz's party. He arrives at the party and realizes that Tracy's dog has followed him. The dog attacks the staff with all of them turning to Liz to get rid of it. She eventually agrees to help them.
77	19	"Argus"	Jeff Richmond	Josh Siegal, Dylan Morgan & Paula Pell	April 29, 2010	419	5.44
Jack learns that he is in Don Geiss's will. At the will reading Jack inherits Geiss' beloved pet peacock, Argus. When Argus begins acting peculiar, Jack enlists Kenneth's help. Kenneth, who knows all the peafowl calls, tells Jack that Argus muttered senpai and kōhai—master and pupil—nicknames that Geiss and Jack had for each other. Immediately, Jack is convinced that Geiss's soul has inhabited Argus, prompting Jack to release his grief to Argus and finally accepting Geiss' death. It is announced that Grizz will be married at the end of the month. A problem ensues after Grizz cannot decide between Tracy and Dot Com to be his best man. Grizz wants Dot Com as his best man but Liz finds out that Dot Com is in love with Grizz's fiancée unbeknownst to Grizz. Liz manages to change Grizz's mind about Dot Com and he appoints her as his woman of honor instead. Liz and Pete become suspicious of Jenna's new boyfriend Paul L'Astname (Will Forte). The two follow Paul to a bar and find out that Paul is a Jenna impersonator. Liz asks Jenna if she knows what Paul does, which she does. Liz does not approve of the relationship, but she confronts Paul on his intentions with Jenna. Paul tells her that he is not using Jenna to further his career but that he is with her because she accepts him for who he is.
78	20	"The Moms"	John Riggi	Kay Cannon & Robert Carlock	May 6, 2010	420	5.42
TGS celebrates Mother's Day by having the mothers of its cast and staff visit and participate in the holiday episode. Jack, meanwhile, deals with a visit from Colleen. Her real reason for visiting him is that she learned from her friend that Jack is dating Nancy but she tells him she knows about his involvement with Avery after the two had an awkward encounter. She is appalled that he is dating two women at the same time, and demands that he make a choice. Liz learns from her mother (Anita Gillette) that her true love was Buzz Aldrin and not her father (Buck Henry). Liz meets Aldrin and he confesses that it was a good decision that her mother did not stay with him as he spent many of his years as an alcoholic. After her encounter with Aldrin, Liz respects the decision her mother made. Verna visits Jack in hopes of getting the rest of the money he promised to give her. Jack will give her the rest once he believes Jenna is happy around her. Pete learns that Tracy does not know where his mother is, so he decides to cast actress Novella Nelson as Tracy's mother for the episode. Tracy and Nelson have a dislike for one another, however, the two make amends with each other and sing together on the broadcast.
79	21	"Emanuelle Goes to Dinosaur Land"	Beth McCarthy Miller	Matt Hubbard	May 13, 2010	421	4.96
Liz revisits Drew and Dennis in hopes that one of them can be her date to Floyd's wedding. The visits, however, are a disaster. At Cerie's rehearsal dinner, Liz discovers that she will be seated next to Wesley. She invites him as her date to Floyd's wedding. At the wedding, Wesley tells her to get him U.S. residency and proposes marriage to her. Liz agrees to marry him. The combination of Avery deciding not to be Jack's date at Cerie's wedding, and him getting an unexpected visit from Nancy, results in increased complexity in their love triangle. He decides not to sleep with Nancy so that no problem ensues in his decision to choose between them but he ends up sleeping with her anyway. At Floyd's wedding, Jack tells Nancy about Avery, and as a result, Nancy threatens to leave him once the ceremony is over. As Liz is giving a reading, Jack texts her to stall, resulting in Liz reading inappropriate scripture recitations. Tracy is encouraged by Kenneth and Dot Com to take part in a drama film, Hard To Watch, a story of an inner-city boy living in the ghetto, something Tracy can directly relate to. He realizes that playing the role may bring up too many repressed memories. Tracy, Dot Com and Kenneth visit places from Tracy's childhood in order to prepare him for the role, but this backfires when Tracy is brought to tears because of his past.
80	22	"I Do Do"	Don Scardino	Tina Fey	May 20, 2010	422	5.36
Jack decides he wants to be with Nancy. After Floyd's wedding, Liz meets an airline pilot named Carol (Matt Damon). After learning he is a fan of TGS she asks Carol to go with her to Cerie's wedding, which he accepts. At the ceremony, Wesley is distraught that Liz ended their engagement through a text message. Liz tells him that fate brought them together so that she would meet Carol, with whom she can see herself with forever. Wesley is devastated and leaves. Carol is shocked at this and leaves. At the same time, Nancy learns that Avery is pregnant after talking to her, and tells Jack before she leaves him. When Jack finds Avery, he tells her he wants to marry her, which she accepts. Elsewhere, Kenneth is notified by Pete that he has received a promotion that would send him to Los Angeles. Kenneth, not wanting to move, decides to lose the promotion by doing a terrible job as a page, but this backfires when Pete is forced to dismiss him. After Cerie's wedding everyone gathers at the TGS set for Grizz's wedding. Jack tells Liz that Carol has arrived at the reception. Carol decides to forget what happened earlier and give Liz a chance so that the two can have a relationship. Kenneth, who is drunk, gets on stage, and gives a ranting speech to his former co-workers.

== Reception ==
=== Critical reception ===
On Rotten Tomatoes, the season has an approval rating of 72% with an average score of 7.5 out of 10 based on 36 reviews. The website's critical consensus reads, "Though a tad uneven and perhaps a victim of its own success, '30 Rock's fourth season nevertheless continues to deliver plenty of subversive satire and hearty laughs." Robert Canning of IGN scored this season an 8.4 out of 10 rating, noting it was "impressive" and that 30 Rock "is no longer a fresh new series and a bit of the Season 4 doldrums could be felt mid season. But the great start and fantastic finish proved that there's still a lot of great comedy to be found on the stages of 30 Rock." Aaron Barnhart of The Kansas City Star deemed the first episode of the season, "Season 4" as "one of the weakest" episodes from 30 Rock that he has ever seen, and found the episode boring. In his review of the third episode, "Stone Mountain", Leonard Pierce of The A.V. Club gave it a "C" grade, and not entirely favorable to the first two episodes, Pierce commented that 30 Rock "needs to give us something fast to get rid of the worst-season-ever stink that's starting to gather."

DVD Talk's Ryan Keefer opined that the fourth season was a "drop in form" from the show's previous seasons. IGN contributor Dan Iverson, reviewing the DVD release, wrote "There aren't many shows on television that are as consistently funny as 30 Rock [...] Not content to rest on silly characters and smart gags ... the show brought in new characters and created story arcs which made the season worth watching from beginning to the end." Iverson deemed the premiere and "Into the Crevasse" as "two excellent episodes" from the season. Metacritic, which gives a score based on critical reviews, gave this season of 30 Rock a rating of 73/100 from 17 reviews, signifying "generally favorable."

=== Ratings ===
The fourth season premiere, "Season 4", attracted 6.4 million American viewers, down from the 8.7 million that viewed the third season premiere. However, the second episode, "Into the Crevasse", showed some improvement, garnering 6.7 million viewers. The seventeenth episode of the season, "Lee Marvin vs. Derek Jeter", became the lowest-rated episode of the series in the United States, with 4.0 million viewers watching. Until that point, the first season episodes "Jack the Writer" and "Hard Ball" had been the lowest-rated episodes, having both drawn 4.6 million. Finally, the season finale "I Do Do" was seen by 5.5 million viewers, a slight decrease on the third season finale, "Kidney Now!", which had been seen by 5.7 million. Overall, the season averaged 5.9 million viewers, ranking eighty-sixth for the year, according to Nielsen Media Research.

=== Awards and nominations ===
At the 67th Golden Globe Awards in January 2010, Alec Baldwin won his second Golden Globe Award in the category of Best Performance by an Actor in a Television Series (Comedy or Musical), for his portrayal of Jack Donaghy. Both Baldwin and Tina Fey won the Screen Actors Guild Awards in the categories of Outstanding Performance by a Male Actor in a Comedy Series and Outstanding Performance by a Female Actor in a Comedy Series, respectively.

This season of 30 Rock received 15 Emmy Award nominations, including the series' fourth consecutive nominations for Outstanding Comedy Series, Outstanding Lead Actor in a Comedy Series (Baldwin), and Outstanding Lead Actress in a Comedy Series (Fey). This total was down from the 17 nominations for season 2 and 22 for season 3. Guest appearances by Jon Hamm, Will Arnett, and Elaine Strich all also drew nominations in their respective categories. The ceremony saw the series fail to win any of the awards for which it had been nominated.

== Distribution ==
The series is broadcast in Canada, the United Kingdom, and Australia, in addition to the United States. It was simulcast in Canada on Citytv. This season of 30 Rock was shown in Australia on the Seven Network at 11:30 p.m. local time starting February 1, 2010. The fourth season began in the UK on April 19, 2010, on Comedy Central.

The season was released on DVD by Universal Studios on September 21, 2010, in the United States after it had completed an initial broadcast run on NBC. The three-disc set of 22 episodes has a 1.78:1 aspect ratio, Dolby Surround 2.0 and 5.1, and English and Spanish subtitles. In addition to the episodes, the DVD set special features included unaired scenes, featurettes, and audio commentary on the select episodes, "Stone Mountain", "Audition Day", "The Problem Solvers", "Dealbreakers Talk Show #0001", "Black Light Attack", "Verna", "Anna Howard Shaw Day", and "Don Geiss, America and Hope".
