= Sun Tea (30 Rock) =

- 30 Rock episode
- Episode no.: Season 4 Episode 6
- Directed by: Gail Mancuso
- Written by: Dylan Morgan; Josh Siegal
- Production code: 406
- Original air date: November 19, 2009

Guest appearances
- Nate Corddry as Brian; Al Gore as himself; Marceline Hugot as Kathy Geiss; Chris Parnell as Dr. Leo Spaceman; Bobb'e J. Thompson as Tracy Jr.; Tony Torn as Bertram Geiss; Alysia Reiner as Real Estate agent

Episode chronology
← Previous "The Problem Solvers"	Next → "Dealbreakers Talk Show #0001"
- 30 Rock season 4

"Sun Tea" is the sixth episode of the fourth season of the American television comedy series 30 Rock. It was written by show co-producers Dylan Morgan and Josh Siegal, and directed by Gail Mancuso. It originally aired on NBC in the United States on November 19, 2009. Guest stars in this episode include Nate Corddry, Al Gore, Marceline Hugot, Chris Parnell, Bobb'e J. Thompson, and Tony Torn.

In the episode, Jack Donaghy (Alec Baldwin) puts NBC page Kenneth Parcell (Jack McBrayer) in charge of reducing the fictional sketch comedy show The Girlie Show with Tracy Jordan's (TGS) carbon footprint. Meanwhile, Liz Lemon (Tina Fey) learns her apartment is becoming a condominium and tries to kick out the resident above her (Corddry). At the same time, Jack and Tracy Jordan (Tracy Morgan) reevaluate fatherhood.

"Sun Tea" received generally mixed reviews from television critics. According to the Nielsen ratings system, the episode was watched by 5.858 million households during its original broadcast, and received a 2.9 rating/7 share among viewers in the 18–49 demographic.

== Plot ==
Liz Lemon (Tina Fey) learns that her apartment building is being converted into a condominium and is told that she must purchase her apartment or face a rent increase. She decides that she wants to buy her apartment and the one above her, and turn them into her dream home. When she learns that her neighbor, Brian (Nate Corddry), will not be bribed out of his apartment, she agrees to move in with him, seemingly to save money, hoping to drive him out with her behavior. At work, Liz is disgusted by her staff writer, Frank Rossitano (Judah Friedlander) peeing in bottles to stop global warming. However, she decides to adopt this behavior to force Brian to leave; she is successful.

At the same time, Tracy Jordan (Tracy Morgan) tells his boss, Jack Donaghy (Alec Baldwin), the negative impact fatherhood has had on his life. They both decide to get vasectomies from Dr. Leo Spaceman (Chris Parnell). While waiting, Jack discovers the respect Tracy's son, Tracy Jr. (Bobb'e J. Thompson), has for his father. After being put under, Tracy realizes his life is horrible because he does not have a daughter. Luckily, Jack is able to stop Dr. Spaceman before he conducts the procedure.

Meanwhile, NBC page Kenneth Parcell (Jack McBrayer) is put in charge of reducing TGS with Tracy Jordan's carbon footprint. He argues that Frank's habits, albeit disgusting, are actually environmentally friendly. Kenneth gets advice from former Vice President of the United States Al Gore, who tells him to recycle everything "including jokes". At that point, Gore declares that a whale is in trouble and runs off.

== Production ==
"Sun Tea" was written by show co-producers Dylan Morgan and Josh Siegal, and directed by Gail Mancuso. This episode was the first writing credit for both Morgan and Siegal, and Mancuso's eighth directed 30 Rock episode. Morgan and Siegal, along with series producer Paula Pell, would later collaborate on the episode "Argus", that aired in the show's fourth season on April 29, 2010. "Sun Tea" originally aired on November 19, 2009, on NBC in the United States as the sixth episode of the show's fourth season.

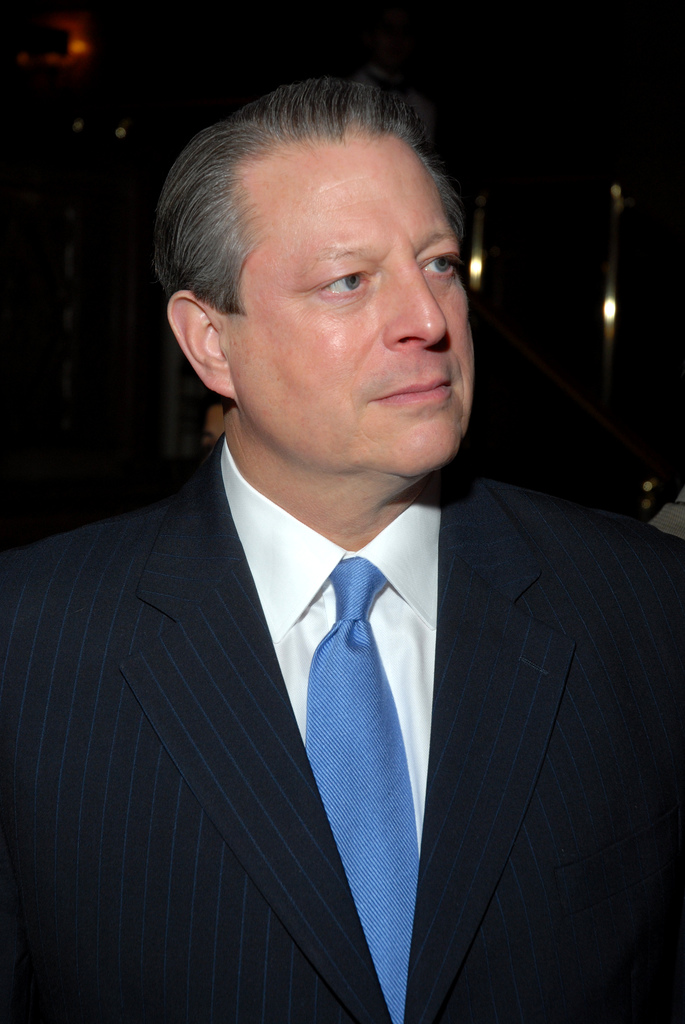
Former Vice President Al Gore made his second appearance as himself on 30 Rock in this episode.

This episode aired as part of Green Week, an initiative introduced by NBC's Chief Executive Jeff Zucker which included having every primetime program which aired between November 15 and November 22, 2009, contain some sort of positive environmental theme. Jack McBrayer, who plays NBC page Kenneth Parcell, in regards to the environmental theme, said "It's something that is relatable and is something that a lot of people are doing. Everybody is on board with greening up the place and being more environmentally friendly in real life. Every now and then people need to be reminded of things that can be done." "Sun Tea" was filmed on October 23 and November 10, 2009.

In October 2009, it was confirmed that actor Nate Corddry, best known as the brother of a former correspondent on the late night satirical television program The Daily Show, would guest star on the show as Liz Lemon's upstairs neighbor. Former Vice President of the United States Al Gore made his second guest appearance, playing himself, with this episode. Gore first appeared in season two episode "Greenzo". Actress Marceline Hugot reprised her role as Kathy Geiss, the daughter of Don Geiss (Rip Torn), for the eighth time. Don Geiss's estranged son, Bertrum (Tony Torn), sues Kathy for control of the Geiss family trust fund. It is later revealed that Kathy is being represented by Teddy Ruxpin. Comedian actor Chris Parnell, who played Dr. Leo Spaceman in this episode, has appeared in the main cast of Saturday Night Live (SNL), a weekly sketch comedy series which airs on NBC in the United States. Series creator, executive producer and lead actress Tina Fey was the head writer on SNL from 1999 until 2006. This episode was actor Bobb'e J. Thompson's third appearance as Tracy Jordan's son, Tracy Jr., on the show. Thompson first guest starred in the episodes "Gavin Volure" and "The Bubble".

The character Astronaut Mike Dexter was first referenced in this episode, in which Liz considers him to be her imaginary perfect husband. In "Sun Tea", "Dot Com" Slattery (Kevin Brown) pretends to be Mike Dexter, Liz's "crazy black boyfriend", to help her get Brian out of his apartment. In the following episode, "Dealbreakers Talk Show", actor John Anderson played the character, when Liz fantasizes about what it would be like following the success of her talk show, and is then notified by Mike Dexter that he has to go back to outer space. Astronaut Mike Dexter would be mentioned further in the season.

One filmed scene from "Sun Tea" was cut out from the airing. Instead, the scene was included on 30 Rock's season four DVD as part of the deleted scenes bonus feature. Frank Rossitano is told to stop peeing in jars in his office and forced to use the bathroom. After exiting a bathroom in the 30 Rock building Frank runs into Kenneth and tells him "They can make me use the bathroom, Kenneth, but they will NEVER stop me from eating food in the garbage." Frank then sees a janitors cart and picks up a half-eaten egg muffin, eats it, and goes through the garbage in search for more food.

== Cultural references ==
- In one scene of "Sun Tea", Jack Donaghy reveals that Don Geiss's son, Bertram, is suing his half-sister, Kathy, for control of the Geiss family trust fund. Kathy, who is outside of court and interviewed by the news media, is being represented by Teddy Ruxpin, an animatronic talking bear, who is dressed in a suit.
- When Liz learns from Kenneth that NBC will have Green Week, she says "Oh brother, are they actually going to do something this year or are they just going to put that stupid green peacock in the corner of the screen?", a reference to the NBC peacock symbol having a green logo design during Green Week. As a result of what Liz said, Kenneth breaks the fourth wall, a term used when a character in a television show, film or on stage directly addresses the audience, when he glances down at the logo.
- Tracy, under anesthetic for his vasectomy operation, dreams that he is playing actor Bill Cosby's television character Cliff Huxtable and Tracy Jr. is Theo Huxtable from the television situation comedy The Cosby Show.
- Jenna Maroney (Jane Krakowski) admits to Kenneth she once took a low-volume shower with actor Ed Begley Jr., and said "What more can I do?", after Kenneth told her he was in charge of reducing TGS's carbon footprint, and that everyone has to help with this. This is a reference to Begley's environmental activism.
- At the end, when Al Gore says "Quiet! A whale is in trouble. I have to go!", he repeats a line from season two episode "Greenzo", in which he also guest starred.

== Reception ==
According to the Nielsen ratings system, "Sun Tea" was watched by 5.858 million households in its original American broadcast. It earned a 2.9 rating/7 share in the 18–49 demographic. This means that it was seen by 2.9 percent of all 18- to 49-year-olds, and 7 percent of all 18- to 49-year-olds watching television at the time of the broadcast. It constituted a three percent drop in viewership from the previous week's episode, "The Problem Solvers". During its original broadcast, "Sun Tea" ranked third in its 9:30 p.m. slot, behind CBS' CSI: Crime Scene Investigation, which drew 15.064 million household viewers, and ABC's Grey's Anatomy, which drew 14.300 million households.

Television columnist Alan Sepinwall for The Star-Ledger was positive about the episode, writing "This was the strongest overall Thursday this season for NBC's comedies, and 'Sun Tea' brought the evening to a fine close. Not all of it worked, but enough of it did ... that I was left happy." He opined that if the episode gave more time to Kathy being represented by Teddy Ruxpin "I would have given 'Sun Tea' my stamp of approval". In regards to the environment story, Sepinwall said it "tied in nicely with both Frank's disgusting jars and the apartment plot". Nick Catucci of New York magazine said that the episode was "chockablock with great mini-sketches, gags, and flights of fancy." Catucci enjoyed Tracy's Cosby dream, while he was anesthetized, calling it "delightful". The A.V. Club's Steven Hyden enjoyed the episode, writing it was "one of the funniest and most enjoyable episodes of the season." Hyden commented that Liz's plot had "a string of craaazy [sic] jokes. But they were amusing to laugh-out-loud jokes." "I wouldn't claim that it was an absolutely top tier episode [...] but what the hell, it had some pretty great moments", said Sean Gandert for Paste magazine. Gandert enjoyed Jack/Tracy and Liz's plots, respectively, was glad that Chris Parnell returned as Dr. Spaceman, and said that Gore "also rarely disappoints", but was not complimentary towards NBC "[shoehorning] its green week thing" into "Sun Tea". Time contributor James Poniewozik observed that "the best bits" from this episode were "Teddy Ruxpin the lawyer; the declaration that 'I, Bertram Geiss, am still Daddy's fancy boy'; and, especially, the show's treatment of the Green Is Universal mandate."

Not all reviews were positive. IGN contributor Robert Canning did not enjoy the green theme in the episode, reasoning that it "just seemed to get in the way of everything else happening in 'Sun Tea'." He was not thrilled with Jack and Tracy's storyline, noting it was missing heart and emotion, and overall it felt "flat". Canning felt that Al Gore's cameo was "fun but wholly unnecessary." Bob Sassone of AOL's TV Squad gave "Sun Tea" a mixed review, noting "I don't know how funny it was, though. I mean, sure, there was still a ton of great lines tonight ... but not all of them hit the mark like they usually do." Nonetheless, Sassone concluded "...any 30 Rock episode with Dr. Spaceman and a couple of digs at NBC's Green Week is still a pretty good one." Meredith Blake, writing for the Los Angeles Times, said this episode of 30 Rock was "even more of a comedy drag race than usual."
