= The Moms =

- 30 Rock episode
- Episode no.: Season 4 Episode 20
- Directed by: John Riggi
- Written by: Kay Cannon; Robert Carlock
- Production code: 420
- Original air date: May 6, 2010

Guest appearances
- Buzz Aldrin as himself; John Anderson as Astronaut Mike Dexter; Elizabeth Banks as Avery Jessup; Kyoko Bruguera as Miho; Will Ferrell as Shane Hunter; Anita Gillette as Margaret Lemon; Jan Hooks as Verna Maroney; Cheyenne Jackson as Danny Baker; Patti LuPone as Sylvia Rossitano; Novella Nelson as herself; Elaine Stritch as Colleen Donaghy

Episode chronology
← Previous "Argus"	Next → "Emanuelle Goes to Dinosaur Land"
- 30 Rock season 4

"The Moms" is the twentieth episode of the fourth season of the American television comedy series 30 Rock, and the 78th overall episode of the series. It was written by co-producer Kay Cannon and co-show runner and executive producer Robert Carlock. The episode was directed by co-executive producer John Riggi. It originally aired on NBC in the United States on May 6, 2010. Guest stars in "The Moms" include Buzz Aldrin, John Anderson, Elizabeth Banks, Kyoko Bruguera, Will Ferrell, Anita Gillette, Jan Hooks, Cheyenne Jackson, Patti LuPone, Novella Nelson, and Elaine Stritch.

In the episode, the fictitious show The Girlie Show with Tracy Jordan (TGS) celebrate the Mother's Day holiday by having the mothers of its cast and staff (Bruguera, Gillette, Hooks, LuPone, Nelson, and Stritch) visit. Meanwhile, Jack Donaghy (Alec Baldwin) must deal with a visit from his mother Colleen Donaghy (Stritch) who begins to meddle in his relationships with Avery Jessup (Banks) and Nancy Donovan (Julianne Moore).

"The Moms" received generally positive reviews from television critics. According to the Nielsen Media Research, the episode was watched by 5.420 million households during its original broadcast, and received a 2.6 rating/7 share among viewers in the 18–49 demographic. For her performance in this episode, Elaine Stritch received a Primetime Emmy Award nomination in the category for Outstanding Guest Actress in a Comedy Series.

== Plot ==
Liz Lemon (Tina Fey), the head writer of the TGS with Tracy Jordan show, brings her boss Jack Donaghy (Alec Baldwin) a budget approval on the show's planned Mother's Day episode by gathering around its cast and staff mothers. Liz reminds Jack that Mother's Day is coming up, prompting Jack to realize he forgot to send his mother Colleen Donaghy (Elaine Stritch) flowers and informs his office assistant Jonathan (Maulik Pancholy) to send her flowers, however, Colleen is waiting outside Jack's office door. Colleen's real reason for visiting her son is that she learned from her friend in Florida that Jack is dating Nancy Donovan (Julianne Moore), a recent divorcée, and a woman who happens to be Jack's high school sweetheart. During dinner, Colleen does not bring Nancy up, but tells Jack she knows about his involvement with CNBC host Avery Jessup (Elizabeth Banks) after an awkward encounter between Avery and Jack in an elevator with Colleen present; because of the encounter, Colleen knows that Avery and Jack are sleeping together. Colleen is appalled that Jack is dating two women at the same time, tells Avery; both demand that he end it and make a choice between Nancy and Avery.

While trying on her bridesmaid's dress in the TGS fitting room, Colleen, Sylvia Rossitano (Patti LuPone), and Verna Maroney (Jan Hooks) criticize Liz for not being married by now as she is in her late thirties, but Liz does not care what they think. Later, Liz has a conversation with her mother Margaret Lemon (Anita Gillette) regarding Liz being single. During their conversation, Margaret reveals that her true love was Buzz Aldrin and not Liz's father Dick Lemon (Buck Henry), which shocks Liz. She tells Jack about what her mother has revealed to her and ponders why her mother did not choose to be with Buzz. Jack offers to introduce her to Buzz with Liz accepting, and wanting to find out what her mother missed out on. During their meet, Buzz confesses that it was a good decision that Margaret did not stay with him as he spent many of his years as an alcoholic. After her encounter with Buzz, Liz tells her mother that she respects the decision she made by not ending up with Buzz.

At the same time, Verna visits Jack in hopes of getting the rest of the money he promised to give her in the episode "Verna"—as Jack paid her off to be a good mother to her daughter Jenna Maroney (Jane Krakowski) and to visit her daughter on a regular basis—but Jack will give her the rest of the money once he believes Jenna is happy around her. While discussing what to wear for the Mother's Day episode, Verna suggests that Jenna wear an outfit that she made, but Jenna does not want to. Nonetheless, Verna and Jenna make up and wear each other's clothes on the broadcast. Meanwhile, TGS producer Pete Hornberger (Scott Adsit) learns that Tracy Jordan (Tracy Morgan) does not know where his mother is, so he decides to cast actress Novella Nelson to be his mother for the Mother's Day episode. Tracy and Novella have a dislike to one another, however, the two make amends with each other and sing together on the holiday episode.

== Production ==
"The Moms" was written by co-producer Kay Cannon and co-show runner and executive producer Robert Carlock. The episode was directed by 30 Rock co-executive producer and staff writer John Riggi. This was Cannon's seventh writing credit, and Carlock's fifteenth penned episode. This was Riggi's third directed episode for the series after "Goodbye, My Friend" and "The Problem Solvers". "The Moms" originally aired on NBC in the United States on May 6, 2010, as the twentieth episode of the show's fourth season and the 78th overall episode of the series. This episode of 30 Rock was filmed on March 5 and March 10, 2010.

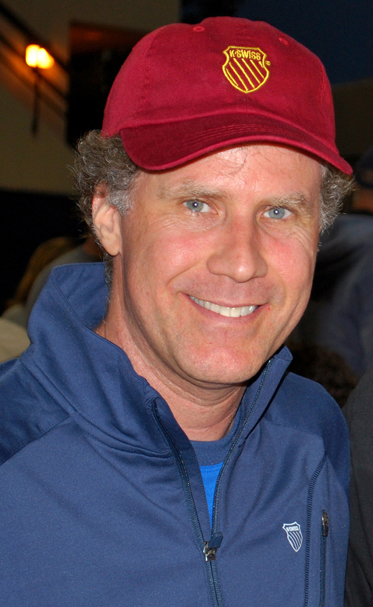
Will Ferrell reprised his role as Shane Hunter from Bitch Hunter.

Actresses Anita Gillette, Jan Hooks, Patti LuPone, and Elaine Stritch reprised their roles as Margaret Lemon, Verna Maroney, Sylvia Rossitano, and Colleen Donaghy, respectively, the mothers of the characters Liz Lemon, Jenna Maroney, Frank Rossitano (Judah Friedlander), and Jack Donaghy, respectively. John Lutz appears as the mother of his character, TGS writer J.D. Lutz, but it is unclear whether this is portrayed as a casting joke on the part of 30 Rock or whether the character of Lutz is impersonating his own mother within the show. In addition, actress Novella Nelson guest starred as herself as Tracy Jordan's fake "mother" for the first time. Former astronaut Buzz Aldrin played himself in the episode as it is revealed that he was in a relationship with Liz's mother. In an interview with TV Guide in discussion of his guest spot, Aldrin said "That was wonderful, carrying on a conversation with very professional actors I greatly admired. I felt very honored to be paired up with something that also has another connection to me. [...] That was a lot of fun." Aldrin revealed that when first notified about the guest appearance he had to "think about it a little bit", and he mistook 30 Rock with the show 3rd Rock from the Sun, a program that previously aired on NBC.

The show made reference of Jack's love triangle storyline with CNBC host Avery Jessup and his high school sweetheart Nancy Donovan, played by actresses Elizabeth Banks and Julianne Moore, respectively. This plot was first introduced in the April 22, 2010, episode "Lee Marvin vs. Derek Jeter". The love triangle dilemma would continue throughout the season. Moore was announced as a love interest for Alec Baldwin's Jack in November 2009, while Banks' guest spot as a love interest for the Jack character was confirmed in December 2009. Actor Cheyenne Jackson made his sixth appearance as his 30 Rock character Danny Baker. In this episode, Danny introduces his mother Miho (Kyoko Bruguera) to J.D. Lutz (John Lutz) and Lutz tells Danny that he had no idea he was adopted as Miho is Asian and Danny is not. Actor John Anderson made his third appearance on the show and was credited as Astronaut Mike Dexter, an individual whom Liz considers to be her imaginary perfect husband. During a flashback of her younger years, Margaret—played by Tina Fey—is walking with a man named "Ed"—played by Anderson—later revealed that "Ed" was Buzz Aldrin, her first love.

Comedian actor Will Ferrell had a brief appearance in "The Moms". In the beginning of the episode, Liz tells Jack that NBC wants TGS to have a Mother's Day themed episode after the network received criticism for re-airing the offensive action drama Bitch Hunter. In a clip, Ferrell—as the character Shane Hunter—says "Put the mimosas down, bitch!". 30 Rock staff writer Jack Burditt and Mad Men creator Matthew Weiner are credited as the writers of that Bitch Hunter episode. This was Ferrell's second appearance as Shane Hunter having first appeared as the character in "Lee Marvin vs. Derek Jeter". Ferrell has appeared in the main cast of Saturday Night Live (SNL), a weekly sketch comedy series which airs on NBC in the United States. Fey was the head writer on SNL from 1999 until 2006. The song Sincerely by The Moonglows featured in this episode.

== Cultural references ==
Verna confesses that she once sexually assaulted former professional basketball player Scottie Pippen. When Pete tells Tracy that actress Novella Nelson will be his "mother", Tracy says he had his sights on actress Phylicia Rashad or professional tennis player Serena Williams to be his "mother". When Liz learns that her mother could have been an astronaut's wife, Margaret explains that it was not that simple as she had just graduated from secretary school and got a job as a secretary at Sterling Cooper. The latter is a fictional advertising agency on the AMC program Mad Men. In addition, actor Jon Hamm, who plays the lead role on Mad Men, has had a recurring role on 30 Rock as a love interest for Tina Fey's character. Later, Liz gets angry at her mother's admission of not marrying Buzz Aldrin and tells her that actress Laura Linney "could've played you in the HBO original movie Moon Wives."

== Reception ==
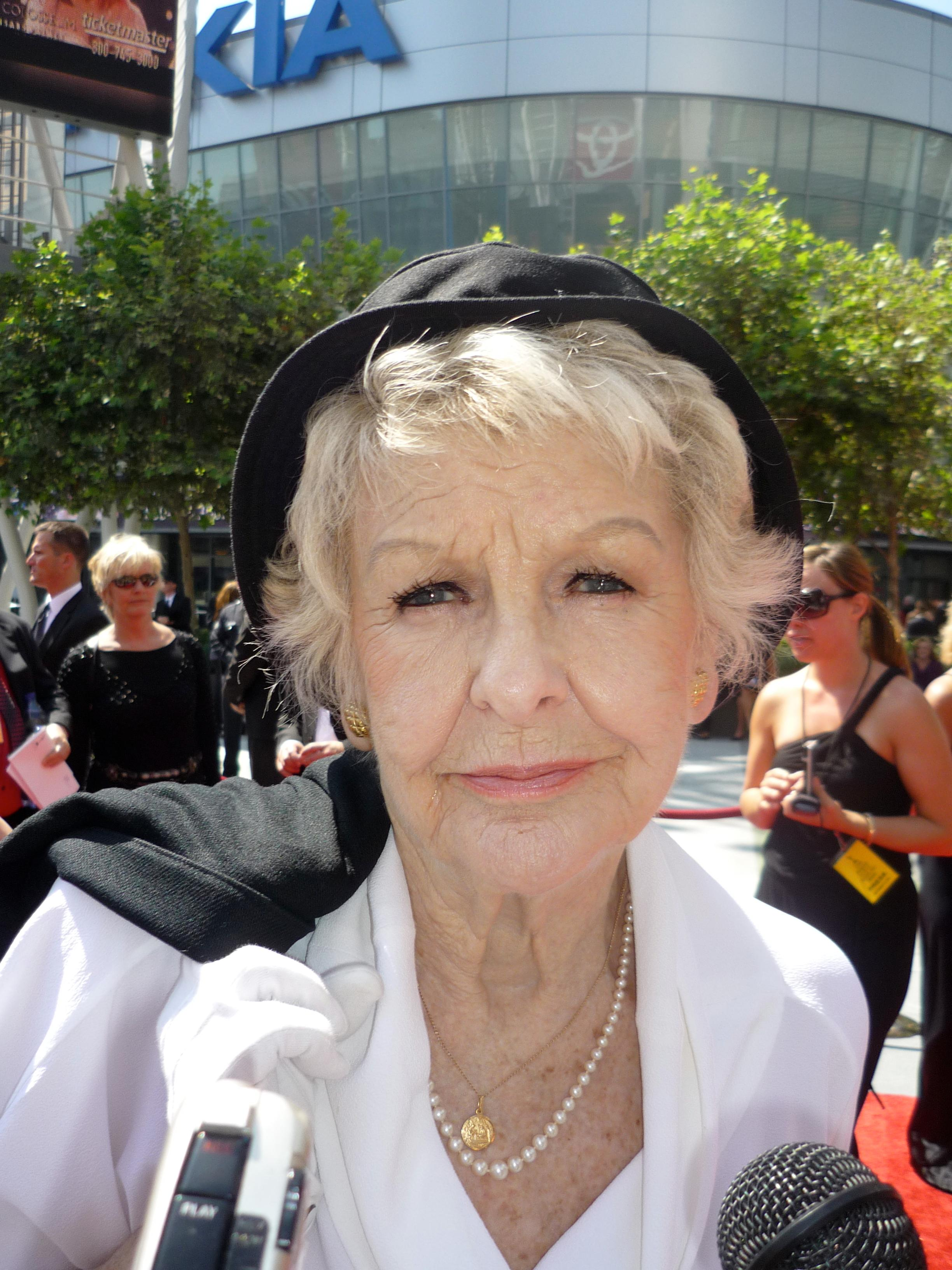
Elaine Stritch received an Emmy nomination for Outstanding Guest Actress in a Comedy Series for her performance in this episode.

In its original American broadcast, "The Moms" was watched by 5.420 million households, according to the Nielsen Media Research. It received a 2.6 rating/7 share among viewers in the 18–49 demographic, meaning that 2.6 percent of all people in that group, and 7 percent of all people from that group watching television at the time, watched the episode. This was a decrease from the previous episode, "Argus", which was watched by 5.439 million households. Elaine Stritch received a Primetime Emmy Award nomination for Outstanding Guest Actress in a Comedy Series at the 62nd Primetime Emmy Awards for her performance in this episode, but lost it to actress Betty White for hosting SNL.

IGN contributor Robert Canning gave the episode an 8.7 out of 10 rating saying he liked all the mothers coming back and loved Buzz Aldrin's appearance, writing that despite Aldrin not being a great actor "he had enough good lines to overcome this short fall." The A.V. Club's Emily VanDerWerff gave "The Moms" episode a B grade rating, noting "...I just liked the episode for having all of the characters have their moms wandering around." Entertainment Weekly contributor Emily Exton gave the episode a positive review, writing that it was fun to see "the resemblances between all the moms and their kids" and enjoyed Will Ferrell's cameo here. At the beginning of his review, Adam Mersel of TV Guide said that this episode was not funny and was "amused, a bit confused, and left wanting more." After recapping the episode he said that he took his comments back, explaining that the episode "did have laughs." Television columnist Alan Sepiwall for HitFix wrote this episode of 30 Rock "wasn't a very funny episode of the show ... yet it did some nice things in trying to pull Liz and some of the other characters back into reality." Sepinwall commented that Tracy and Jenna's stories with their mothers were "nice grounded moments for the show's two broadest main characters, and the sort of thing 30 Rock needs to do with them a few times a season." Bob Sassone of AOL's TV Squad liked this episode better than the previous episode "Argus", enjoyed Elaine Stritch's return as Jack's mother, and that Tracy's story with Novella Nelson was "actually well done", explaining that his situation makes sense in the TGS world. The Houston Press' Daniel Carlson wrote that "The Moms" was "fun but lighter than air, content to string together a mild plot with a series of good jokes and callbacks." Nick Catucci for New York magazine was positive about the episode, and reported that Tracy and Novella Nelson had the best chemistry of the night.

Time contributor James Poniewozik noted that "The Moms" had a lot of potential, explaining that the return of the television character's mothers "[had] the ability to bring out the insecure children in their respective grown kids. But rather than advance any themes or storylines of the show, the episode mostly repeated them", regarding Jack's love triangle. Sean Gandert of Paste said that Jack's relationship troubles in choosing between Nancy and Avery "feels like it's been dragging on forever." Nonetheless, Gandert commented Liz's story "was the real heart of the episode."

The return of Bitch Hunter received positive reviews from television critics. Exton said "thank you NBC for re-airing Bitch Hunter, more Will Ferrell for us!" Canning opined that 30 Rock "may want to be careful of overdoing this funny but one-note joke." Carlson enjoyed the reappearance, noting it was "a welcome touch."
