= Floyd (30 Rock) =

- 30 Rock episode
- Episode no.: Season 4 Episode 16
- Directed by: Millicent Shelton
- Written by: Paula Pell
- Production code: 416
- Original air date: March 25, 2010

Guest appearances
- Kathie Lee Gifford as herself; Lester Holt as himself; Cheyenne Jackson as Danny; Hoda Kotb as herself; Kristin McGee as Kaitlin; Jason Sudeikis as Floyd; Meredith Vieira as herself

Episode chronology
← Previous "Don Geiss, America and Hope"	Next → "Lee Marvin vs. Derek Jeter"
- 30 Rock season 4

"Floyd" is the sixteenth episode of the fourth season of the American television comedy series 30 Rock, and the 74th overall episode of the series. It was written by series producer Paula Pell, and directed by Millicent Shelton. The episode originally aired on NBC in the United States on March 25, 2010. Cheyenne Jackson, Kristin McGee, and Jason Sudeikis guest star in this episode, and there are cameo appearances by Kathie Lee Gifford, Lester Holt, Hoda Kotb, and Meredith Vieira.

In the episode, Liz Lemon's (Tina Fey) ex-boyfriend, Floyd DeBarber (Sudeikis), tells her that he is getting married. At the same time, Jack Donaghy (Alec Baldwin) helps Danny Baker (Jackson) get his revenge against The Girlie Show with Tracy Jordan (TGS) writers—Frank Rossitano (Judah Friedlander), James "Toofer" Spurlock (Keith Powell), and J. D. Lutz (John Lutz)—after they play a practical joke on him. Meanwhile, Jenna Maroney (Jane Krakowski) and Tracy Jordan (Tracy Morgan) spend a long day listening to NBC page Kenneth Parcell (Jack McBrayer) tell stories about his childhood.

"Floyd" received generally mixed reception from television critics. According to the Nielsen ratings system, the episode was watched by 6.252 million households during its original broadcast, and received a 2.9 rating/8 share among viewers in the 18–49 demographic.

== Plot ==
Liz Lemon (Tina Fey) gets a surprise phone call from her ex-boyfriend, Floyd DeBarber (Jason Sudeikis), who says he will be coming to New York and wants to have dinner with her. She begins to hope that the two can get back together, however, while watching The Today Show she discovers that he is marrying Kaitlin (Kristin McGee). Her boss, Jack Donaghy (Alec Baldwin), warns her not to attempt revenge; nevertheless, Liz invites Floyd to a seafood restaurant where she had food poisoning on three separate occasions. He does not get food poisoning, but instead, Floyd, a recovering alcoholic, gets drunk off of the whiskey-based fish sauce. The two get into an argument, and after Floyd insults her, Liz leaves the restaurant. The next day, Floyd appears on The Today Show, but still drunk from the night before, refuses to leave the 30 Rock building. Liz apologizes to both Floyd and Kaitlin for getting him drunk. They accept the apology, and Kaitlin asks Liz to be a participant in their wedding, to which she agrees.

At the same time, jealous of the publicity that Danny Baker (Cheyenne Jackson) is getting after receiving a Juno Award nomination, Frank Rossitano (Judah Friedlander), James "Toofer" Spurlock (Keith Powell), and J. D. Lutz (John Lutz), the staff writers from TGS with Tracy Jordan, print a fake, embarrassing New York Times interview with him and circulate it throughout the 30 Rock building. Danny brings the upsetting article to Jack, but Jack quickly figures out that Frank, Toofer, and Lutz are the ones behind it due to the writer being "Seymour Nips." To get back at them, Jack and Danny trick them into thinking the building has been invaded by a "Cloverfield-type monster" and stripping in front of the TGS dancers. Frank, Toofer, and Lutz, however, via a remark from Jack, discover a secret code from the "Twig and Plums" prank society that Jack belonged to while attending Princeton University. Frank realizes he can use this to manipulate him, which works - Jack must exit the room whenever the code is spoken. As a result of this, Jack threatens to sleep with Frank's mother, and promises to find Toofer and Lutz's mothers as well, which prompts them to ease off on their pranks.

Finally, to keep Jenna Maroney (Jane Krakowski) and Tracy Jordan (Tracy Morgan) distracted from Danny's fanfare, TGS producer, Pete Hornberger (Scott Adsit) sends them to the makeup department to have plaster face-prints made while NBC page Kenneth Parcell (Jack McBrayer) talks to them. Jenna and Tracy are plagued by erotic dreams involving Kenneth, and to stop having them, they decide to stay awake. This fails, so they decide to "Elm Street" Kenneth by killing him in their dreams. They wake up (believing they are still dreaming) and attack Kenneth. Witnessing this, Pete tells them they are wide awake, and that it is morning, which prompts Jenna and Tracy to realize that they slept through the night without having any dreams of Kenneth. They apologize to Kenneth for attacking him, and he accepts their apology.

The episode ends with Pete scolding Tracy and Jenna for their bad behavior, and the two apologize, promise to be good, and are about to sing Pete a thank you song, only for Pete to awaken (this having been a dream) at his desk. Kenneth arrives, and it soon turns out that Pete is having an erotic dream about Kenneth and Liz. Pete is unable to wake up, and he screams in horror.

== Production ==
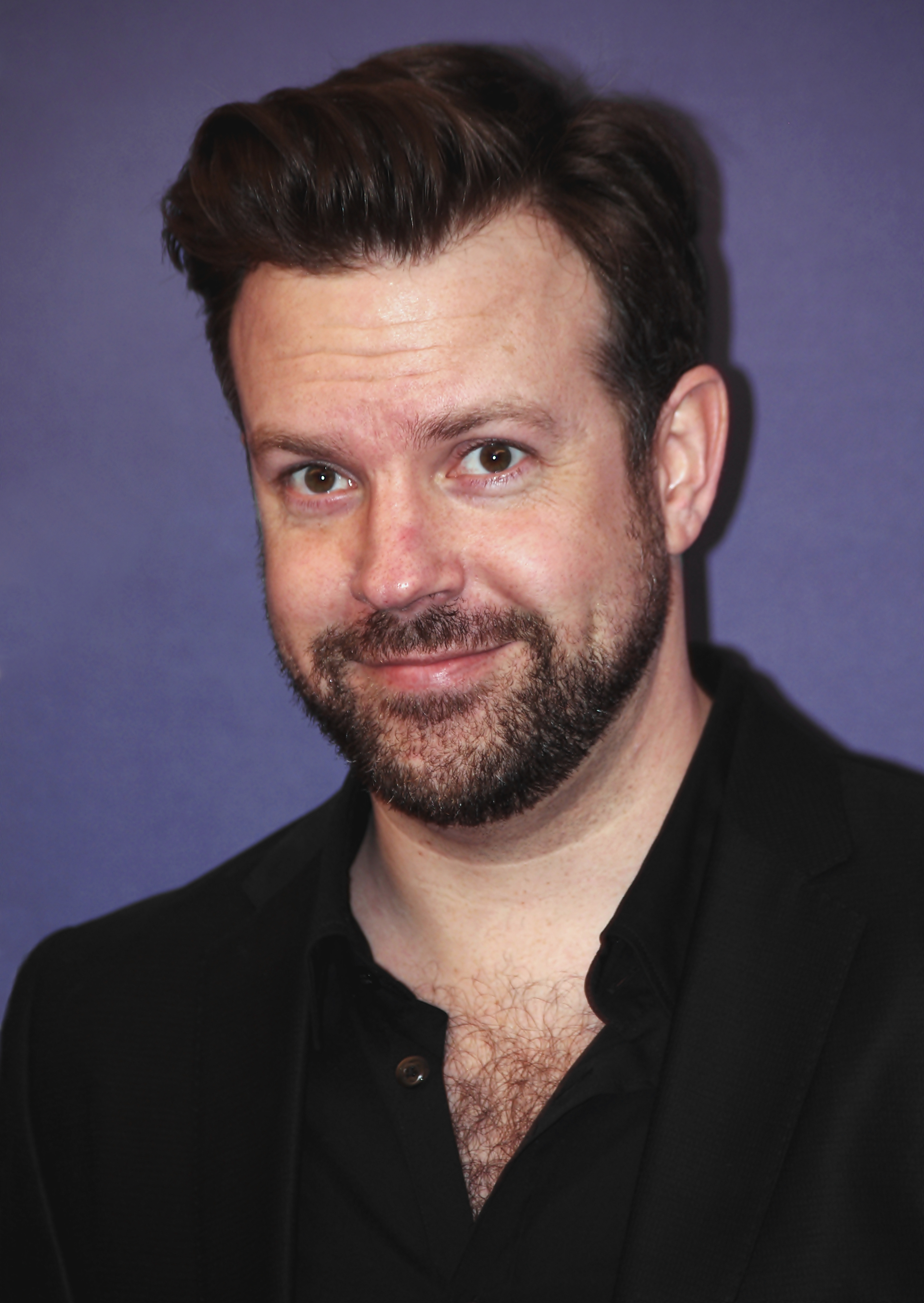
Jason Sudeikis reprised his role as Floyd in this episode.

"Floyd" was written by series producer Paula Pell and directed by Millicent Shelton. This episode was Pell's first writing credit and the second episode for Shelton who had directed the March 26, 2009, season three episode "Apollo, Apollo". "Floyd" originally aired in the United States on March 25, 2010, on NBC as the sixteenth episode of the show's fourth season and the 74th overall episode of the series. Pell has appeared on the show as the character Paula Hornberger, the wife of Pete Hornberger, played by Scott Adsit.

"Floyd" was filmed on January 27 and February 3, 2010. Comedian actor Jason Sudeikis, who played Floyd DeBarber in this episode, has appeared in the main cast of Saturday Night Live (SNL), a weekly sketch comedy series which airs on NBC in the United States. Tina Fey, the series creator of 30 Rock, was the head writer on SNL from 1999 until 2006. This was Sudeikis's tenth appearance on the show. Actor Cheyenne Jackson made his fifth appearance as Danny Baker. Jackson previously appeared in the episodes "The Problem Solvers", "Secret Santa", "Black Light Attack!", and "Winter Madness". In an interview with The New York Times, Jackson revealed that the song he sings in the episode was composed by Jeff Richmond, the show's composer, and said that the song was "actually a little longer" and that they shot a "whole" music video to accompany it.

"Floyd" featured cameo appearances from The Today Show correspondents Meredith Vieira, Lester Holt, Kathie Lee Gifford, and Hoda Kotb. In the episode, Vieira introduces Floyd and his fiancée, Kaitlin, as finalists competing to have their wedding featured on The Today Show. In one scene, Danny runs into the writers' room where Frank, Toofer, and Lutz are. He turns on the television to see Holt who reports, "We're now getting reports that the toxic leaks have created a Cloverfield type monster in the building. The monster cannot detect the smell of human skin. Anyone still inside should disrobe immediately." Jack calls Liz into his office and shows her that Floyd, drunk from his dinner with her, is still in the 30 Rock building, where he is shown interrupting a segment featuring Gifford and Kotb.

== Cultural references ==
In the beginning of the episode, Liz tells Jenna about a bad date that she had with someone she met on the personals section of the Kraft Foods web site, K-date. Pete congratulates Danny on his Juno Award nomination for his Canadian pump-up song for the National Hockey League team, the Ottawa Senators. Danny replies, "It's an honor to be nominated in the same category as Sir Dave Coulier", the latter is an American actor. Liz imitates singer-songwriter Christopher Cross while singing "All my days I've been waiting, for you to come back home. Moonlight of New York City", after revealing that she hoped to end up with Floyd one day and Cross would sing a romantic song about them. This song would be extended on the 30 Rock Original Television Soundtrack by Cross himself. Liz makes reference to the fact that once, on television, one could not say the word "crap", but "then they let that slide and now we can say whatever we want." She and Jack exchange the words, "Douchebag", "asswipe", and "Anal rot", as examples. Later, Liz tells Jack, "I don't care. I'll start my own group. Rejection from society is what created the X-Men", which references the comic book superhero team, the X-Men, who are rejected from society due to their mutant special powers.

In the false breaking news story, Lester Holt references the 2007 monster movie Cloverfield. After learning about the toxic leaks in the building, in which Frank, Toofer, and Lutz need to strip down, Frank says "So much of my life was wasted creating hats!" This is a reference to Judah Friedlander, who portrays Frank in the show and who is known for his trademark trucker hats which he wears in and out of the Frank character. When Liz tells Floyd that she saw him on The Today Show, on which she learned he is getting married, Floyd says "Dammit! I could have sworn you watch The Early Show on CBS", to which Liz replies, "The Early Show? What am I, in a hospital?". Liz reveals that she once participated in a reenactment on America's Most Wanted playing a woman who is strangled on a toilet. Jenna and Tracy, who are having strange dreams about Kenneth, decide they "have to Elm Street this. We have to go to sleep and kill Kenneth in our dreams!" This references the A Nightmare on Elm Street film series, in which the movie's main character—Freddy Krueger—stalks and kills his victims in their dreams.

== Reception ==
In its original American broadcast, "Floyd" was watched by 6.252 million households, according to the Nielsen ratings system. It received a 2.9 rating/8 share among viewers in the 18–49 demographic, meaning that 2.9 percent of all people in that group, and 8 percent of all people from that group watching television at the time, watched the episode. This was a decrease from the previous episode, "Don Geiss, America and Hope", which was watched by 6.9 million American viewers. "Floyd" has received mixed reception from television critics.

"There are episodes of 30 Rock that manage to blend quasi-human plots about Liz or Jack with the zany antics of everyone else at TGS and make them all feel like part of the same show, but 'Floyd' never quite pulled it off."

— Alan Sepinwall,
The Star-Ledger

IGN contributor Robert Canning gave the episode a 7.4 out of 10 rating, writing that he "merely" liked the episode. "It wasn't nearly as fun as I had hoped it would be. I mean, if you were going to bring Floyd back and name the episode after him, it would have been nice to give [Liz and Floyd] a little spark." The A.V. Club's Nathan Rabin gave it a C rating, calling it a disappointing episode. In regards to Jason Sudeikis, Rabin commented that he is a "gifted comic actor" but this episode "found him at his hammy, embarrassing worst." Meredith Blake, writing for the Los Angeles Times, remarked that the episode "may have been the worst one yet", and said that when Floyd called Liz a "badger", her heart broke into smithereens, "There's mean-funny, and then there's plain old mean. [...] Liz's love life has become the central butt of the joke on 30 Rock ... and it's starting to feel like the writers have run out of ways to be funny without being sadistic." Sean Gandert of Paste said that "Floyd" was not a great episode, "but it's still pretty good by this season's standards, if a somewhat disappointing use of Floyd's return." He explained that part of the episode's problem was that Liz's relationships not succeeding "has become pretty old hat for the show since we've seen it time and time again", and hoped to see her "find a good man and let the show move onto something else for a while." TV Guide's Adam Mersel wrote that it "really didn't do it for me. I didn't really laugh out loud much, and the cameo from one of my favorite SNL players came off a bit forced."

Bob Sassone of AOL's TV Squad gave a positive review of both Liz and Jack's plot, but was not favorable towards Jenna and Tracy's, opining that "Floyd" was one of those episodes of 30 Rock where their plot "really dragged the show down." He reported that he felt bad for Liz "because of all the guys [she] has dated over these four seasons, [Floyd]'s the one she should end up with." Sassone hoped the episode would have concluded with the two finding out "something horrible" about Floyd's fiancée "or maybe we'd find out that Floyd did all of this just to get close to Liz again in some weird way". Like Sassone, Time contributor James Poniewozik said that the Floyd character "was one of the better drawn boyfriends for Liz". Further in his recap, Poniewozik was "a little disappointed" that the episode brought him back "to get sloppy drunk, to tell off Liz ... and to get engaged to a vapid-seeming 'ab model.'" Television columnist Alan Sepinwall for The Star-Ledger commented that Sudeikis's return gave Tina Fey's Liz "one of her more down-to-earth and relatable stories in a while", and enjoyed the Frank, Toofer, and Lutz rivalry with Jack and Danny, as well as Pete's involvement in the Jenna and Tracy story. Overall, Sepinwall said that the episode did not "really hang together for me."
