= Winter Madness =

- 30 Rock episode
- Episode no.: Season 4 Episode 11
- Directed by: Beth McCarthy-Miller
- Written by: Tom Ceraulo; Vali Chandrasekaran
- Production code: 411
- Original air date: January 21, 2010

Guest appearances
- Ray Bokhour as Dale Snitterman; Cheyenne Jackson as Danny Baker; Kevin Meaney as actor playing John Hancock; Julianne Moore as Nancy Donovan

Episode chronology
← Previous "Black Light Attack!"	Next → "Verna"
- 30 Rock season 4

"Winter Madness" is the eleventh episode of the fourth season of the American television comedy series 30 Rock, and the 69th overall episode of the series. The episode was written by Tom Ceraulo and Vali Chandrasekaran, and directed by Beth McCarthy-Miller. It originally aired on NBC in the United States on January 21, 2010. Guest stars in this episode include Ray Bokhour, Cheyenne Jackson, Kevin Meaney, and Julianne Moore.

In the episode, when head writer Liz Lemon (Tina Fey) decides to take the fictitious show The Girlie Show with Tracy Jordan (TGS) on the road to cure the staff's case of the winter madness, the anticipated trip does not exactly go as planned. Her boss, Jack Donaghy (Alec Baldwin), chooses Boston as the destination and travels with the show in order to visit Nancy Donovan (Moore), and while away from New York, the TGS crew blames Liz for all of their misfortunes. This episode also continued a story arc involving Nancy as a love interest for Jack, which began in the episode "Secret Santa" that aired in December 2009.

"Winter Madness" received generally mixed reception from television critics. According to the Nielsen Media Research, it was watched by 5.585 million households during its original broadcast, and received a 2.8 rating/7 share among viewers in the 18–49 demographic.

== Plot ==
TGS head writer Liz Lemon (Tina Fey), along with producer Pete Hornberger (Scott Adsit), decides to take the show's staff to Miami for a week, due to Liz's hate of the cold weather and the staff's case of "winter madness". Her boss, Jack Donaghy (Alec Baldwin), decides to take them to Boston instead, so he can see Nancy Donovan (Julianne Moore), a woman Jack ponders having a possible romance with. He learns that Nancy's husband has left her as a way of getting her to ask for a divorce, but Nancy refuses to do so, fearing what others might think. Jack admits his true feelings to Nancy and insists that the two talk. She suggests that they should say four words to each other as a way of putting their relationship on hold; Jack says to her "I'll wait. Not forever", while Nancy tells him "I'll try. Wicked hard."

Meanwhile, the TGS staff—Jenna Maroney (Jane Krakowski), Frank Rossitano (Judah Friedlander), James "Toofer" Spurlock (Keith Powell), J. D. Lutz (John Lutz), Sue Laroche-Van der Hout (Sue Galloway), Kenneth Parcell (Jack McBrayer), Cerie Xerox (Katrina Bowden), and Danny Baker (Cheyenne Jackson)—vent their anger at Liz; they complain that Boston is colder than New York, and they do not like sharing an office with the all-male staff of Boston Bruins fans who write for the Bruins Beat. Liz gets a tip from Jack to find a common enemy in the Boston affiliate of NBC. Liz comes up with the name "Dale Snitterman", and tells the staff that Snitterman is causing all of their problems, not realizing until later that she had seen the name somewhere and did not make it up. At that point, the staff finds Snitterman (Ray Bokhour) and harass him.

At the same time, Tracy Jordan (Tracy Morgan) goes on Boston's Freedom Trail. He tells the actor playing John Hancock (Kevin Meaney) that his character did not actually set all Americans free. When he tells him "Patriots suck!", he inadvertently says it near a group of New England Patriots fans. At the end of the episode, Hancock brings in the Crispus Attucks character and tells Tracy he does have black friends. When Hancock says he met Attucks in 1775, Tracy is able to one up him as he knows that Attucks was killed in the Boston Massacre in 1770.

== Production ==
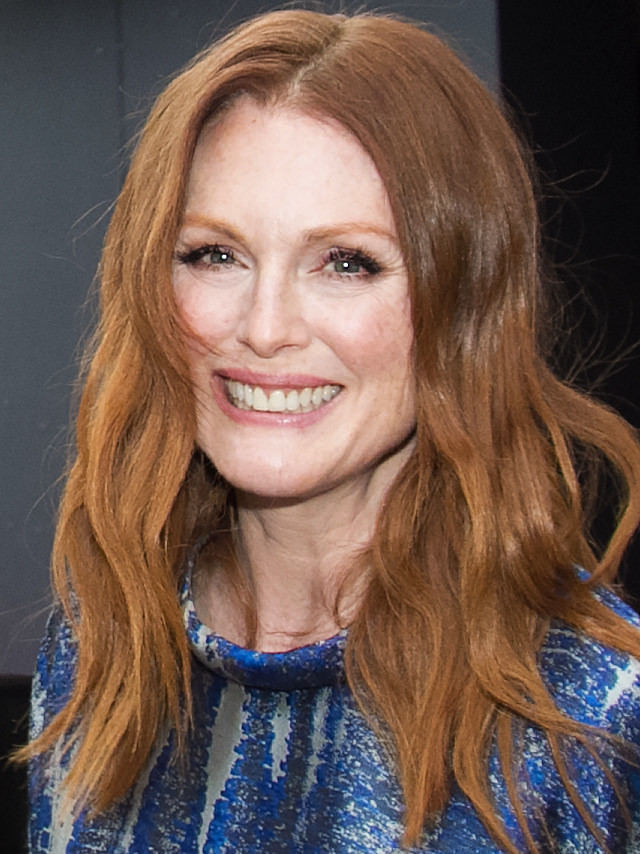
Julianne Moore made her second appearance as Nancy Donovan in this episode.

"Winter Madness" was written by script co-coordinator Tom Ceraulo and co-producer Vali Chandrasekaran, and directed by Beth McCarthy-Miller. This episode was Ceraulo's second writing credit, having co-written season three episode "The Funcooker, and the first written episode by Chandrasekaran. This was McCarthy-Miller's tenth directed episode. "Winter Madness" originally aired in the United States on January 21, 2010, on NBC as the eleventh episode of the show's fourth season and the 69th overall episode of the series.

In November 2009, it was announced that actress Julianne Moore would guest star on 30 Rock as a love interest for Jack Donaghy, Alec Baldwin's character. She made her debut as the character Nancy Donovan in the December 10, 2009, episode "Secret Santa". This episode was Moore's second appearance on the show. "Winter Madness" was filmed on November 17, 2009. Comedian Kevin Meaney guest starred as the actor portraying John Hancock. This was actor Cheyenne Jackson's fourth appearance as Danny Baker in the series. He made his debut in the November 12, 2009, episode "The Problem Solvers", and would later guest star on the episodes "Secret Santa", "Black Light Attack!", "Floyd", and "The Moms". In "Winter Madness", while venting their anger towards Liz, Danny admits his refusal to hit on Jenna.

== Cultural references ==
In the beginning of the episode, Liz complains about the cold weather saying that she has been stuck inside her apartment playing online Boggle, a word game designed by using a plastic grid of lettered dice, in which players attempt to find words in sequences of adjacent letters. Later, Jack tells Liz that she is the female version of former Boston Celtics basketball player Kevin McHale. Jack's Boston office is a duplication of his New York one. When Liz enters, Jack asks her if she can tell which seven items are different, prompting the two to look into the camera and smile and thus breaking the fourth wall, a term used when a character in a television show, film or on stage directly addresses the audience. In one scene, Jack says that a Boston family named its daughter "Belichick", after New England Patriots head coach Bill Belichick.

During one scene of "Winter Madness", Toofer tells the writing staff that he went to college in Boston, "Well, not in Boston, but nearby", mocking a common stereotype of Harvard students that they will not mention that they attend the University, for fear of intimidating anyone, but will still strongly hint to it. Later, Jack and Nancy imitate former Boston newscasters Chet Curtis and Natalie Jacobson, who were the most-watched news team in Boston for twenty years. Nancy tells Jack that her husband moved to New Orleans to rebuild houses that were affected by Hurricane Katrina to repair the shoddy craftsmanship of actor Brad Pitt's Make It Right Foundation, an organization building affordable housing to help those families most in need following the aftermath of Hurricane Katrina.

== Reception ==
In its original American broadcast, "Winter Madness" was watched by 5.585 million households, according to the Nielsen Media Research. It received a 2.8 rating/7 share among viewers in the 18–49 demographic, meaning that 2.8 percent of all people in that group, and 7 percent of all people from that group watching television at the time, watched the episode. This was an increase from the previous episode, "Black Light Attack!", which was watched by 5.014 million American viewers. "Winter Madness" ranked third in the timeslot and was the only episode getting more viewers, going up 22 percent from the previous week's episode rating.

The episode received generally mixed reviews from television critics. Robert Canning of IGN said the episode was great and gave it an 8.8 out 10 rating, saying that he was "impressed" with how the ending handled Jack and Nancy's "not-quite romance." Canning enjoyed the "platonic romance" between them saying, "A lesser series could have simply had the pair hook up, break up and move on, but 30 Rock has drawn out the relationship with flirtation, what-ifs and possible future ex-husbands." Meredith Blake, writing for the Los Angeles Times, found the episode "perfectly" and "well-timed". Leonard Pierce for The A.V. Club said that the episode started "out wicked strong, with everyone in the cast getting great lines". In regards to the two plots, Pierce said that the Liz, TGS, and Dale Snitterman story was "stuffed with great comedic moments", while the Jack and Nancy angle just sat there and flopped "around like a dying fish." Bob Sassone of AOL's TV Squad enjoyed the Boston theme in "Winter Madness"; his only complaint was that the episode had nothing to do with TGS, the fictional show on 30 Rock. "I'm getting a little tired of that. I want more sketches and NBC network shenanigans."

Entertainment Weekly’s Margaret Lyons reported that "Winter Madness" was "something of a letdown." She commented that Julianne Moore's Nancy was not "funny enough" as a "romantic foil for Jack", and that taking the show to Boston seemed off the mark. Television columnist Alan Sepinwall for The Star-Ledger reported that "Winter Madness" fell into the category of an episode that featured "a lot of funny gags but aren't wholly satisfying" and added that it "just stopped, rather than building to a real conclusion". Sean Gandert of Paste rated unfavorably the pairing of Alec Baldwin and Julianne Moore's characters, citing that they do not have "much rapport, so the scenes with the two of them together are a bit dead, as much as I usually enjoy seeing Julianne Moore in pretty much anything." Amos Barshad for New York magazine criticized Moore's Boston accent, citing that it was "atrocious", while TV Guide Magazine’s Bruce Fretts opined that the accent was "wicked bad". Regarding the episode itself, Fretts said that it was "weak".

Despite the criticism towards Moore's Boston accent in the series, executive producer Robert Carlock, who is from Boston, defended Moore. In an interview with New York magazine, Carlock said, "I grew up with people like that. Not everyone talks like that in Boston, but I think she's enough of an actress to pull it off." When asked if her accent "sounded realistic", he noted, "I'm going to go with that. I know people who sound like that." In response to the accent, Moore explained "I went to school in Boston and worked with a lot of guys from Dorchester, so that's where [the accent] came from. We made it thick ... for humor's sake, but then again, not really. There are folks with seriously heavy accents there, and they are proud of it."
