= List of awards and nominations received by 30 Rock =

Awards and nominations received by 30 Rock
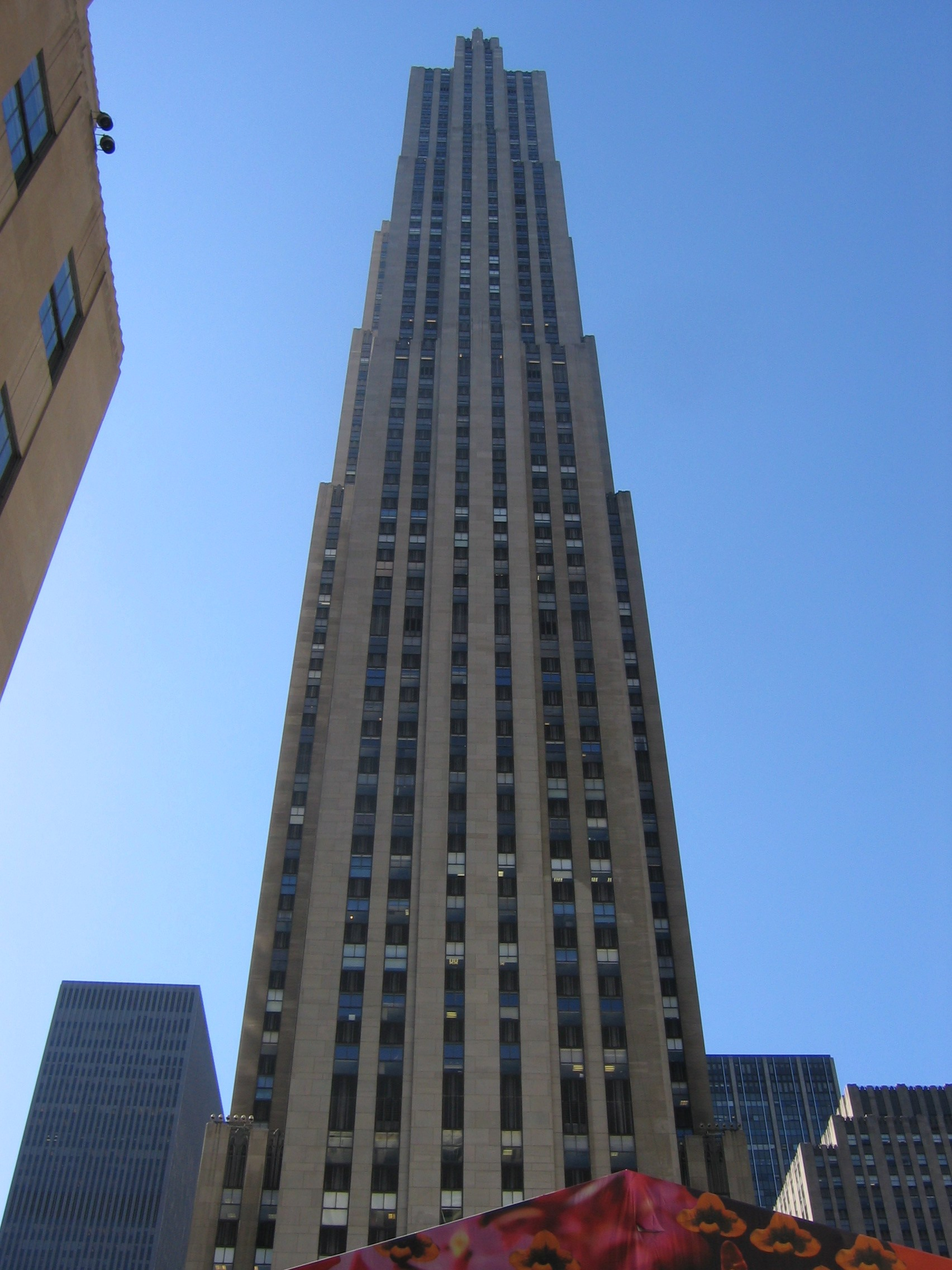
- 30 Rockefeller Plaza, the titular setting of 30 Rock
Awards and nominations
Award	Wins	Nominations
ALMA Awards	0	1
American Cinema Editors Awards	2	4
American Film Institute Awards	2	2
Art Directors Guild Awards	0	4
Artios Awards	0	1
Cinema Audio Society Awards	0	1
Costume Designers Guild Awards	0	1
Critics' Choice Television Awards	1	4
Directors Guild of America Awards	1	9
Dorian Awards	0	5
Environmental Media Awards	2	2
GLAAD Media Awards	1	2
Golden Globe Awards	6	17
Gracie Awards	7	7
Humanitas Prize	0	1
NAACP Image Awards	2	18
Peabody Awards	1	1
People's Choice Awards	0	2
Primetime Emmy Awards	16	114
Producers Guild of America Awards	3	7
Satellite Awards	1	12
Screen Actors Guild Awards	12	22
Teen Choice Awards	0	1
Television Critics Association Awards	3	10
Writers Guild of America Awards	8	22

Totals (Note: Certain award groups do not simply award one winner. They acknowledge several different recipients, have runners-up, and have third place. Since this is a specific recognition and is different from losing an award, runner-up mentions are considered wins in this award tally. For simplification and to avoid errors, each award in this list has been presumed to have had a prior nomination.)
- Wins: 68
- Nominations: 270

30 Rock is an American satirical situation comedy that premiered on NBC on October 11, 2006. Created by Tina Fey, the television series has won and been nominated for a variety of different awards during its seven season run. It received 114 Emmy Awards nominations, with 10 Emmy Award nominations for its first season alone, and a further 17 Emmy Award nominations in its second season. The show won the Primetime Emmy Award for Outstanding Comedy Series for its first three seasons and was nominated every year it was eligible.

Lead actress Tina Fey has been nominated for awards 27 times for her role as Liz Lemon, the head writer of the fictional television show TGS with Tracy Jordan. Fey has also been nominated eight times for her writing skills. Lead actor Alec Baldwin has been nominated 27 times for his portrayal of NBC television executive Jack Donaghy. Through its run, 30 Rock was nominated for 270 different awards, winning 68.

During its run, 30 Rock was nominated for seventeen and won six Golden Globe Awards. The first award was won by Alec Baldwin in 2007, for his role of Jack Donaghy. Tina Fey won a Golden Globe for her role of Liz Lemon in 2008. In 2009, 30 Rock won all Golden Globe Awards it was nominated for, sweeping the musical or comedy television series awards for both acting and the series as a whole.

For the show's 2007 episodes, 30 Rock received a Peabody Award at the 67th Annual Peabody Awards. Upon announcing the award, the Peabody Board commended the show for being "not only a great workplace comedy in the tradition of The Mary Tyler Moore Show, complete with fresh, indelible secondary characters, but also a sly, gleeful satire of corporate media, especially the network that airs it."

== Awards and nominations ==
Award	Year (Note: The listed year refers to the date of the ceremony.)	Category	Nominee(s)	Result	Ref(s)
ALMA Awards	2009	Year in TV Comedy – Actress	Salma Hayek	Nominated	
American Cinema Editors Awards	2008	Best Edited Half-Hour Series for Television	Ken Eluto (for "The C Word")	Nominated	
American Cinema Editors Awards	2009	Best Edited Half-Hour Series for Television	Meg Reticker (for "Reunion")	Won	
American Cinema Editors Awards	2010	Best Edited Half-Hour Series for Television	Ken Eluto (for "Apollo, Apollo")	Won	
American Cinema Editors Awards	2014	Best Edited Half-Hour Series for Television	Ken Eluto and Meg Reticker (for "Hogcock!" / "Last Lunch")	Nominated	
American Film Institute Awards	2008	Television Programs of the Year	30 Rock	Won	
American Film Institute Awards	2011	Television Programs of the Year	30 Rock	Won	
Art Directors Guild Awards	2009	Excellence in Production Design for an Episode of a Half Hour Single-Camera Television Series	Peter Baran, Jennifer Greenberg, Fred Kolo, Elina Kother, Teresa Mastropierro, and Keith Raywood (for "Do-Over")	Nominated	
Art Directors Guild Awards	2010	Excellence in Production Design for an Episode of a Half Hour Single-Camera Television Series	Peter Baran, Jennifer Greenberg, Elina Kother, Teresa Mastropierro, and Keith Raywood (for "Apollo, Apollo")	Nominated	
Art Directors Guild Awards	2011	Excellence in Production Design for an Episode of a Half Hour Single-Camera Television Series	Peter Baran, Jennifer Greenberg, Elina Kother, Teresa Mastropierro, and Keith Raywood (for "Live Show")	Nominated	
Art Directors Guild Awards	2012	Excellence in Production Design for an Episode of a Half Hour Single-Camera Television Series	Peter Baran, Jennifer Greenberg, Elina Kother, Teresa Mastropierro, and Keith Raywood (for "Double-Edged Sword")	Nominated	
Artios Awards	2013	Outstanding Achievement in Casting – Television Series – Comedy	Katja Blichfeld and Jessica Daniels	Nominated	
Cinema Audio Society Awards	2013	Outstanding Achievement in Sound Mixing for Television Series – Half Hour	Griffin Richardson and Tony Pipitone	Nominated	
Costume Designers Guild Awards	2009	Outstanding Contemporary Television Series	Tom Broecker	Nominated	
Critics' Choice Television Awards	2011	Best Comedy Series	30 Rock	Nominated	
Critics' Choice Television Awards	2011	Best Actor in a Comedy Series	Alec Baldwin	Nominated	
Critics' Choice Television Awards	2011	Best Actress in a Comedy Series	Tina Fey	Won	
Critics' Choice Television Awards	2011	Best Supporting Actress in a Comedy Series	Jane Krakowski	Nominated	
Directors Guild of America Awards	2007	Outstanding Directorial Achievement in Comedy Series	Adam Bernstein (for "Pilot") (Note: Bernstein's directorial team: Neri Tannenbaum (unit production manager); Stephen Lee Davis (first assistant director); Betsy Jo Friedman-Palmieri (second assistant director); Jane Chase Wells (second second assistant director))	Nominated	
Directors Guild of America Awards	2008	Outstanding Directorial Achievement in Comedy Series	Michael Engler (for "Rosemary's Baby") (Note: Engler's directorial team: Diana Schmidt (unit production manager); Chris Swartout (first assistant director); Jane Ferguson (second assistant director))	Nominated	
Directors Guild of America Awards	2008	Outstanding Directorial Achievement in Comedy Series	Beth McCarthy-Miller (for "Somebody to Love") (Note: McCarthy-Miller's directorial team: Diana Schmidt (unit production manager); Stephen Lee Davis (first assistant director); Bellamy Forrest (second assistant director); Brendan Walsh (second second assistant director))	Nominated	
Directors Guild of America Awards	2009	Outstanding Directorial Achievement in Comedy Series	Beth McCarthy-Miller (for "Reunion") (Note: McCarthy-Miller's directorial team: Diana Schmidt (unit production manager); Stephen Lee Davis (first assistant director); Bellamy Forrest (second assistant director); Kerry McCrohan (second second assistant director); Chris George (second second assistant director and location manager))	Nominated	
Directors Guild of America Awards	2009	Outstanding Directorial Achievement in Comedy Series	Don Scardino (for "Do-Over") (Note: Scardino's directorial team: Diana Schmidt (unit production manager); Stephen Lee Davis (first assistant director); Bellamy Forrest (second assistant director); Kerry McCrohan (second second assistant director); Chris George (second second assistant director and location manager))	Nominated	
Directors Guild of America Awards	2011	Outstanding Directorial Achievement in Comedy Series	Beth McCarthy-Miller (for "Live Show") (Note: McCarthy-Miller's directorial team: Diana Schmidt (unit production manager); Stefani Cohen and Bob Caminiti (associate directors); James E. Sheridan (first assistant director); Jennifer Truelove (second assistant director); Gena Rositano, Chris Kelly, and Eddie Valk (stage managers))	Nominated	
Directors Guild of America Awards	2012	Outstanding Directorial Achievement in Comedy Series	Don Scardino (for "Double-Edged Sword") (Note: Scardino's directorial team: Diana Schmidt (unit production manager); James E. Sheridan (first assistant director); Jennifer Truelove (second assistant director))	Nominated	
Directors Guild of America Awards	2013	Outstanding Directorial Achievement in Comedy Series	Beth McCarthy-Miller (for "Live from Studio 6H") (Note: McCarthy-Miller's directorial team: Diana Schmidt (unit production manager); Stefani Cohen, Bob Caminiti, and Michael Poole (associate directors); James E. Sheridan (first assistant director); Jennifer Truelove and Bill Sell (second assistant directors); Gena Rositano, Chris Kelly, and Lynn Finkel (stage managers))	Nominated	
Directors Guild of America Awards	2014	Outstanding Directorial Achievement in Comedy Series	Beth McCarthy-Miller (for "Hogcock!" / "Last Lunch") (Note: McCarthy-Miller's directorial team: Diana Schmidt (unit production manager); Bill Sell (assistant unit production manager); Stephen Lee Davis (first assistant director); Vanessa Hoffman (second assistant director); Suk Yi Mar (location manager))	Won	
Dorian Awards	2010	TV Musical or Comedy of the Year	30 Rock	Nominated	
Dorian Awards	2010	TV Performance of the Year: Musical or Comedy	Alec Baldwin	Nominated	
Dorian Awards	2011	TV Musical or Comedy of the Year	30 Rock	Nominated	
Dorian Awards	2012	TV Comedy of the Year	30 Rock	Nominated	
Dorian Awards	2014	TV Musical Performance of the Year	Jane Krakowski (for "Theme from Rural Juror")	Nominated	
Environmental Media Awards	2008	Television Episodic Comedy	30 Rock (for "Greenzo")	Won	
Environmental Media Awards	2010	Television Episodic Comedy	30 Rock (for "Sun Tea")	Won	
GLAAD Media Awards	2007	Outstanding Individual Episode	30 Rock (for "Blind Date")	Nominated	
GLAAD Media Awards	2011	Outstanding Individual Episode	30 Rock (for "Klaus and Greta")	Won	
Golden Globe Awards	2007	Best Actor in a Television Series – Musical or Comedy	Alec Baldwin	Won	
Golden Globe Awards	2008	Best Actor in a Television Series – Musical or Comedy	Alec Baldwin	Nominated	
Golden Globe Awards	2008	Best Actress in a Television Series – Musical or Comedy	Tina Fey	Won	
Golden Globe Awards	2008	Best Television Series – Musical or Comedy	30 Rock	Nominated	
Golden Globe Awards	2009	Best Actor in a Television Series – Musical or Comedy	Alec Baldwin	Won	
Golden Globe Awards	2009	Best Actress in a Television Series – Musical or Comedy	Tina Fey	Won	
Golden Globe Awards	2009	Best Television Series – Musical or Comedy	30 Rock	Won	
Golden Globe Awards	2010	Best Actor in a Television Series – Musical or Comedy	Alec Baldwin	Won	
Golden Globe Awards	2010	Best Actress in a Television Series – Musical or Comedy	Tina Fey	Nominated	
Golden Globe Awards	2010	Best Television Series – Musical or Comedy	30 Rock	Nominated	
Golden Globe Awards	2011	Best Actor in a Television Series – Musical or Comedy	Alec Baldwin	Nominated	
Golden Globe Awards	2011	Best Actress in a Television Series – Musical or Comedy	Tina Fey	Nominated	
Golden Globe Awards	2011	Best Television Series – Musical or Comedy	30 Rock	Nominated	
Golden Globe Awards	2012	Best Actor in a Television Series – Musical or Comedy	Alec Baldwin	Nominated	
Golden Globe Awards	2012	Best Actress in a Television Series – Musical or Comedy	Tina Fey	Nominated	
Golden Globe Awards	2013	Best Actor in a Television Series – Musical or Comedy	Alec Baldwin	Nominated	
Golden Globe Awards	2013	Best Actress in a Television Series – Musical or Comedy	Tina Fey	Nominated	
Gracie Awards	2007	Outstanding Female Lead – Comedy Series	Tina Fey	Won	
Gracie Awards	2008	Outstanding Director – Entertainment Series or Special	Gail Mancuso	Won	
Gracie Awards	2008	Outstanding Female Lead – Comedy Series	Tina Fey	Won	
Gracie Awards	2010	Outstanding Comedy	30 Rock	Won	
Gracie Awards	2012	Outstanding Director – Entertainment	Tricia Brock	Won	
Gracie Awards	2013	Outstanding Director – Entertainment	Beth McCarthy-Miller	Won	
Gracie Awards	2013	Outstanding Female Actor in a Guest Role	Sherri Shepherd	Won	
Humanitas Prize	2009	30 Minute Network or Syndicated Television	Robert Carlock (for "Believe in the Stars")	Nominated	
NAACP Image Awards	2008	Outstanding Comedy Series	30 Rock	Nominated	
NAACP Image Awards	2008	Outstanding Supporting Actor in a Comedy Series	Tracy Morgan	Nominated	
NAACP Image Awards	2009	Outstanding Comedy Series	30 Rock	Nominated	
NAACP Image Awards	2009	Outstanding Directing in a Comedy Series	Kevin Rodney Sullivan (for "MILF Island")	Won	
NAACP Image Awards	2009	Outstanding Supporting Actor in a Comedy Series	Tracy Morgan	Nominated	
NAACP Image Awards	2010	Outstanding Comedy Series	30 Rock	Nominated	
NAACP Image Awards	2010	Outstanding Directing in a Comedy Series	Ken Whittingham (for "The Funcooker")	Won	
NAACP Image Awards	2010	Outstanding Supporting Actor in a Comedy Series	Tracy Morgan	Nominated	
NAACP Image Awards	2011	Outstanding Comedy Series	30 Rock	Nominated	
NAACP Image Awards	2011	Outstanding Directing in a Comedy Series	Ken Whittingham (for "Anna Howard Shaw Day")	Nominated	
NAACP Image Awards	2011	Outstanding Supporting Actor in a Comedy Series	Tracy Morgan	Nominated	
NAACP Image Awards	2011	Outstanding Writing in a Comedy Series	Vali Chandrasekaran (for "Khonani")	Nominated	
NAACP Image Awards	2012	Outstanding Comedy Series	30 Rock	Nominated	
NAACP Image Awards	2012	Outstanding Writing in a Comedy Series	Vali Chandrasekaran (for "It's Never Too Late for Now")	Nominated	
NAACP Image Awards	2013	Outstanding Directing in a Comedy Series	Ken Whittingham (for "Queen of Jordan 2: Mystery of the Phantom Pooper")	Nominated	
NAACP Image Awards	2013	Outstanding Supporting Actor in a Comedy Series	Tracy Morgan	Nominated	
NAACP Image Awards	2013	Outstanding Writing in a Comedy Series	Robert Carlock and Vali Chandrasekaran (for "Murphy Brown Lied to Us")	Nominated	
NAACP Image Awards	2014	Outstanding Supporting Actor in a Comedy Series	Tracy Morgan	Nominated	
Peabody Awards	2008	—N/a	30 Rock (Universal Media Studios in association with Broadway Video Television and Little Stranger, Inc.) (Note: Production credits: Lorne Michaels, Tina Fey, Marci Klein, David Miner, Robert Carlock, and JoAnn Alfano (executive producers); John Riggi, Jack Burditt, Dave Finkel, Brett Baer, Ron Weiner, Jon Pollack, Matt Hubbard, Jeff Richmond, Don Scardino, Jerry Kupfer, Irene Burns, Diana Schmidt, Jennifer Danielson, Eric Gurian, and Andrew Singer (producers); Paul Feig, Scardino, Beth McCarthy, Dennie Gordon, Adam Bernstein, Michael Engler, and Gail Mancuso (directors); Fey, Burditt, Carlock, Riggi, Finkel, Baer, Donald Glover, Daisy Gardner, Hubbard, Pollack, Kay Cannon, Weiner, and Tami Sagher (writers); Jason Simmons, Alan Lundgren, and Maggie Klaus (web designers); Fey, Alec Baldwin, Tracy Morgan, Jane Krakowski, Jack McBrayer, Scott Adsit, Judah Friedlander, Katrina Bowden, Keith Powell, and Lonny Ross (actors))	Won	
People's Choice Awards	2007	Favorite New TV Comedy	30 Rock	Nominated	
People's Choice Awards	2014	Favorite Series We Miss Most	30 Rock	Nominated	
Primetime Emmy Awards	2007	Outstanding Comedy Series	30 Rock (Note: Nominees: Lorne Michaels, Tina Fey, David Miner, JoAnn Alfano, Marci Klein, Robert Carlock, Jack Burditt, John Riggi, Brett Baer, Dave Finkel, Adam Bernstein, Jeff Richmond, and Jerry Kupfer)	Won	
Primetime Emmy Awards	2007	Outstanding Lead Actor in a Comedy Series	Alec Baldwin	Nominated	
Primetime Emmy Awards	2007	Outstanding Lead Actress in a Comedy Series	Tina Fey	Nominated	
Primetime Emmy Awards	2007	Outstanding Writing for a Comedy Series	Robert Carlock (for "Jack-Tor")	Nominated	
Primetime Emmy Awards	2007	Outstanding Writing for a Comedy Series	Tina Fey (for "Tracy Does Conan")	Nominated	
Primetime Emmy Awards	2007	Outstanding Directing for a Comedy Series	Scott Ellis (for "The Break-Up")	Nominated	
Primetime Emmy Awards	2008	Outstanding Comedy Series	30 Rock (Note: Nominees: Lorne Michaels, Tina Fey, Marci Klein, David Miner, Robert Carlock, John Riggi, Jack Burditt, Jeff Richmond, Don Scardino, and Jerry Kupfer)	Won	
Primetime Emmy Awards	2008	Outstanding Lead Actor in a Comedy Series	Alec Baldwin	Won	
Primetime Emmy Awards	2008	Outstanding Lead Actress in a Comedy Series	Tina Fey	Won	
Primetime Emmy Awards	2008	Outstanding Writing for a Comedy Series	Tina Fey (for "Cooter")	Won	
Primetime Emmy Awards	2008	Outstanding Writing for a Comedy Series	Jack Burditt (for "Rosemary's Baby")	Nominated	
Primetime Emmy Awards	2008	Outstanding Directing for a Comedy Series	Michael Engler (for "Rosemary's Baby")	Nominated	
Primetime Emmy Awards	2009	Outstanding Comedy Series	30 Rock (Note: Nominees: Lorne Michaels, Tina Fey, Marci Klein, David Miner, Robert Carlock, John Riggi, Jack Burditt, Ron Weiner, Matt Hubbard, Jeff Richmond, Don Scardino, and Jerry Kupfer)	Won	
Primetime Emmy Awards	2009	Outstanding Lead Actor in a Comedy Series	Alec Baldwin	Won	
Primetime Emmy Awards	2009	Outstanding Lead Actress in a Comedy Series	Tina Fey	Nominated	
Primetime Emmy Awards	2009	Outstanding Supporting Actor in a Comedy Series	Tracy Morgan	Nominated	
Primetime Emmy Awards	2009	Outstanding Supporting Actor in a Comedy Series	Jack McBrayer	Nominated	
Primetime Emmy Awards	2009	Outstanding Supporting Actress in a Comedy Series	Jane Krakowski	Nominated	
Primetime Emmy Awards	2009	Outstanding Writing for a Comedy Series	Matt Hubbard (for "Reunion")	Won	
Primetime Emmy Awards	2009	Outstanding Writing for a Comedy Series	Robert Carlock (for "Apollo, Apollo")	Nominated	
Primetime Emmy Awards	2009	Outstanding Writing for a Comedy Series	Robert Carlock and Jack Burditt (for "Kidney Now!")	Nominated	
Primetime Emmy Awards	2009	Outstanding Writing for a Comedy Series	Ron Weiner (for "Mamma Mia")	Nominated	
Primetime Emmy Awards	2009	Outstanding Directing for a Comedy Series	Todd Holland (for "Generalissimo")	Nominated	
Primetime Emmy Awards	2009	Outstanding Directing for a Comedy Series	Beth McCarthy-Miller (for "Reunion")	Nominated	
Primetime Emmy Awards	2009	Outstanding Directing for a Comedy Series	Millicent Shelton (for "Apollo, Apollo")	Nominated	
Primetime Emmy Awards	2010	Outstanding Comedy Series	30 Rock (Note: Nominees: Lorne Michaels, Tina Fey, Marci Klein, David Miner, Robert Carlock, John Riggi, Ron Weiner, Matt Hubbard, Jeff Richmond, Don Scardino, and Jerry Kupfer)	Nominated	
Primetime Emmy Awards	2010	Outstanding Lead Actor in a Comedy Series	Alec Baldwin	Nominated	
Primetime Emmy Awards	2010	Outstanding Lead Actress in a Comedy Series	Tina Fey	Nominated	
Primetime Emmy Awards	2010	Outstanding Supporting Actress in a Comedy Series	Jane Krakowski	Nominated	
Primetime Emmy Awards	2010	Outstanding Writing for a Comedy Series	Kay Cannon and Tina Fey (for "Lee Marvin vs. Derek Jeter")	Nominated	
Primetime Emmy Awards	2010	Outstanding Writing for a Comedy Series	Matt Hubbard (for "Anna Howard Shaw Day")	Nominated	
Primetime Emmy Awards	2010	Outstanding Directing for a Comedy Series	Don Scardino (for "I Do Do")	Nominated	
Primetime Emmy Awards	2011	Outstanding Comedy Series	30 Rock (Note: Nominees: Lorne Michaels, Tina Fey, Robert Carlock, Marci Klein, David Miner, Jeff Richmond, John Riggi, Ron Weiner, Jack Burditt, Matt Hubbard, Alec Baldwin, Kay Cannon, Vali Chandrasekaran, Don Scardino, Josh Siegal, Dylan Morgan, Irene Burns, and Jerry Kupfer)	Nominated	
Primetime Emmy Awards	2011	Outstanding Lead Actor in a Comedy Series	Alec Baldwin	Nominated	
Primetime Emmy Awards	2011	Outstanding Lead Actress in a Comedy Series	Tina Fey	Nominated	
Primetime Emmy Awards	2011	Outstanding Supporting Actress in a Comedy Series	Jane Krakowski	Nominated	
Primetime Emmy Awards	2011	Outstanding Writing for a Comedy Series	Matt Hubbard (for "Reaganing")	Nominated	
Primetime Emmy Awards	2011	Outstanding Directing for a Comedy Series	Beth McCarthy-Miller (for "Live Show")	Nominated	
Primetime Emmy Awards	2012	Outstanding Comedy Series	30 Rock (Note: Nominees: Lorne Michaels, Tina Fey, Robert Carlock, Marci Klein, David Miner, Jeff Richmond, John Riggi, Ron Weiner, Matt Hubbard, Kay Cannon, Vali Chandrasekaran, Josh Siegal, Dylan Morgan, Luke Del Tredici, Jerry Kupfer, Alec Baldwin, and Irene Burns)	Nominated	
Primetime Emmy Awards	2012	Outstanding Lead Actor in a Comedy Series	Alec Baldwin	Nominated	
Primetime Emmy Awards	2012	Outstanding Lead Actress in a Comedy Series	Tina Fey	Nominated	
Primetime Emmy Awards	2013	Outstanding Comedy Series	30 Rock (Note: Nominees: Tina Fey, Robert Carlock, Marci Klein, David Miner, Jeff Richmond, Jack Burditt, Lorne Michaels, Matt Hubbard, Josh Siegal, Dylan Morgan, Luke Del Tredici, Alec Baldwin, Colleen McGuinness, Tracey Wigfield, and Jerry Kupfer)	Nominated	
Primetime Emmy Awards	2013	Outstanding Lead Actor in a Comedy Series	Alec Baldwin	Nominated	
Primetime Emmy Awards	2013	Outstanding Lead Actress in a Comedy Series	Tina Fey	Nominated	
Primetime Emmy Awards	2013	Outstanding Supporting Actress in a Comedy Series	Jane Krakowski	Nominated	
Primetime Emmy Awards	2013	Outstanding Writing for a Comedy Series	Jack Burditt and Robert Carlock (for "Hogcock!")	Nominated	
Primetime Emmy Awards	2013	Outstanding Writing for a Comedy Series	Tina Fey and Tracey Wigfield (for "Last Lunch")	Won	
Primetime Emmy Awards	2013	Outstanding Directing for a Comedy Series	Beth McCarthy-Miller (for "Hogcock!" / "Last Lunch")	Nominated	
Primetime Creative Arts Emmy Awards	2007	Outstanding Casting for a Comedy Series	Jennifer McNamara	Nominated	
Primetime Creative Arts Emmy Awards	2007	Outstanding Guest Actress in a Comedy Series	Elaine Stritch	Won	
Primetime Creative Arts Emmy Awards	2007	Outstanding Original Main Title Theme Music	Jeff Richmond (for "Hard Ball")	Nominated	
Primetime Creative Arts Emmy Awards	2007	Outstanding Sound Mixing for a Comedy or Drama Series (Half-Hour) and Animation	Griffin Richardson, Tony Pipitone, and Bill Marino (for "Corporate Crush")	Nominated	
Primetime Creative Arts Emmy Awards	2008	Outstanding Casting for a Comedy Series	Jennifer McNamara Shroff	Won	
Primetime Creative Arts Emmy Awards	2008	Outstanding Guest Actor in a Comedy Series	Will Arnett	Nominated	
Primetime Creative Arts Emmy Awards	2008	Outstanding Guest Actor in a Comedy Series	Steve Buscemi	Nominated	
Primetime Creative Arts Emmy Awards	2008	Outstanding Guest Actor in a Comedy Series	Tim Conway	Won	
Primetime Creative Arts Emmy Awards	2008	Outstanding Guest Actor in a Comedy Series	Rip Torn	Nominated	
Primetime Creative Arts Emmy Awards	2008	Outstanding Guest Actress in a Comedy Series	Edie Falco	Nominated	
Primetime Creative Arts Emmy Awards	2008	Outstanding Guest Actress in a Comedy Series	Carrie Fisher	Nominated	
Primetime Creative Arts Emmy Awards	2008	Outstanding Guest Actress in a Comedy Series	Elaine Stritch	Nominated	
Primetime Creative Arts Emmy Awards	2008	Outstanding Sound Mixing for a Comedy or Drama Series (Half-Hour) and Animation	Griffin Richardson, Tony Pipitone, and Bill Marino (for "Episode 210")	Won	
Primetime Creative Arts Emmy Awards	2008	Outstanding Cinematography for a Half-Hour Series	Vanja Černjul (for "Rosemary's Baby")	Nominated	
Primetime Creative Arts Emmy Awards	2008	Outstanding Picture Editing for a Comedy Series (Single or Multi-Camera)	Ken Eluto (for "Cooter")	Nominated	
Primetime Creative Arts Emmy Awards	2008	Outstanding Special Class – Short-Format Live-Action Entertainment Programs	Carole Panick, Andrew Singer, Jack McBrayer, Eric Gurian, and Josh Silberman (for 30 Rock: Kenneth the Web Page)	Nominated	
Primetime Creative Arts Emmy Awards	2009	Outstanding Casting for a Comedy Series	Jennifer McNamara-Shroff	Won	
Primetime Creative Arts Emmy Awards	2009	Outstanding Guest Actor in a Comedy Series	Alan Alda (for "Mamma Mia")	Nominated	
Primetime Creative Arts Emmy Awards	2009	Outstanding Guest Actor in a Comedy Series	Jon Hamm (for "The Bubble")	Nominated	
Primetime Creative Arts Emmy Awards	2009	Outstanding Guest Actor in a Comedy Series	Steve Martin (for "Gavin Volure")	Nominated	
Primetime Creative Arts Emmy Awards	2009	Outstanding Guest Actress in a Comedy Series	Jennifer Aniston (for "The One with the Cast of Night Court")	Nominated	
Primetime Creative Arts Emmy Awards	2009	Outstanding Guest Actress in a Comedy Series	Elaine Stritch (for "Christmas Special")	Nominated	
Primetime Creative Arts Emmy Awards	2009	Outstanding Picture Editing for a Comedy Series (Single or Multi-Camera)	Ken Eluto (for "Apollo, Apollo")	Won	
Primetime Creative Arts Emmy Awards	2009	Outstanding Sound Mixing for a Comedy or Drama Series (Half-Hour) and Animation	Griffin Richardson and Tony Pipitone (for "Kidney Now!")	Nominated	
Primetime Creative Arts Emmy Awards	2009	Outstanding Cinematography for a Half-Hour Series	Matthew Clark (for "Apollo, Apollo")	Nominated	
Primetime Creative Arts Emmy Awards	2009	Outstanding Special Class – Short-Format Live-Action Entertainment Programs	Jack McBrayer, Eric Gurian, Josh Silberman, Tracey Wigfield, and William Sell (for 30 Rock's Kenneth the Web Page)	Nominated	
Primetime Creative Arts Emmy Awards	2009	Outstanding Creative Achievement in Interactive Media – Fiction	The 30 Rock Digital Experience (via NBC.com)	Nominated	
Primetime Creative Arts Emmy Awards	2010	Outstanding Casting for a Comedy Series	Jennifer McNamara-Shroff	Nominated	
Primetime Creative Arts Emmy Awards	2010	Outstanding Guest Actress in a Comedy Series	Elaine Stritch (for "The Moms")	Nominated	
Primetime Creative Arts Emmy Awards	2010	Outstanding Guest Actor in a Comedy Series	Will Arnett (for "Into the Crevasse")	Nominated	
Primetime Creative Arts Emmy Awards	2010	Outstanding Guest Actor in a Comedy Series	Jon Hamm (for "Emanuelle Goes to Dinosaur Land")	Nominated	
Primetime Creative Arts Emmy Awards	2010	Outstanding Picture Editing for a Comedy Series (Single or Multi-Camera)	Ken Eluto (for "Dealbreakers Talk Show #0001")	Nominated	
Primetime Creative Arts Emmy Awards	2010	Outstanding Sound Mixing for a Comedy or Drama Series (Half-Hour) and Animation	Griffin Richardson, Tony Pipitone, and Bill Marino (for "Argus")	Nominated	
Primetime Creative Arts Emmy Awards	2010	Outstanding Costumes for a Series	Tom Broecker, Remy Pearce, and Joanna Brett (for "I Do Do")	Nominated	
Primetime Creative Arts Emmy Awards	2010	Outstanding Cinematography for a Half-Hour Series	Matthew Clark (for "Season 4")	Nominated	
Primetime Creative Arts Emmy Awards	2010	Outstanding Special Class Programs	Eric Gurian, William Sell, and Clint Koltveit (for 30 Rock: The Webisodes)	Nominated	
Primetime Creative Arts Emmy Awards	2011	Outstanding Casting for a Comedy Series	Jennifer McNamara Shroff and Katja Blichfeld	Nominated	
Primetime Creative Arts Emmy Awards	2011	Outstanding Guest Actor in a Comedy Series	Will Arnett	Nominated	
Primetime Creative Arts Emmy Awards	2011	Outstanding Guest Actor in a Comedy Series	Matt Damon	Nominated	
Primetime Creative Arts Emmy Awards	2011	Outstanding Guest Actress in a Comedy Series	Elizabeth Banks	Nominated	
Primetime Creative Arts Emmy Awards	2011	Outstanding Music Composition for a Series (Original Dramatic Score)	Jeff Richmond (for "100")	Nominated	
Primetime Creative Arts Emmy Awards	2011	Outstanding Technical Direction, Camerawork, Video Control for a Series	Steven Cimino, Tim Quigley, Gerard Sava, Marc Bloomgarden, Peter Agliata, Eric A. Eisenstein, John Pinto, Barry Frischer, James Mott, Frank Grisanti, and Susan Noll (for "Live Show (West Coast)")	Nominated	
Primetime Creative Arts Emmy Awards	2011	Outstanding Picture Editing for a Comedy Series (Single or Multi-Camera)	Meg Reticker (for "100")	Nominated	
Primetime Creative Arts Emmy Awards	2011	Outstanding Special Class – Short-Format Live-Action Entertainment Programs	Eric Gurian, Bill Sell, and Clint Koltveit (for 30 Rock: The Webisodes)	Nominated	
Primetime Creative Arts Emmy Awards	2012	Outstanding Art Direction for a Multi-Camera Series	Teresa Masterpierro, Keith Raywood, Peter Baran, and Jennifer Greenberg (for "Live from Studio 6H")	Nominated	
Primetime Creative Arts Emmy Awards	2012	Outstanding Guest Actor in a Comedy Series	Will Arnett	Nominated	
Primetime Creative Arts Emmy Awards	2012	Outstanding Guest Actor in a Comedy Series	Jon Hamm	Nominated	
Primetime Creative Arts Emmy Awards	2012	Outstanding Guest Actress in a Comedy Series	Elizabeth Banks	Nominated	
Primetime Creative Arts Emmy Awards	2012	Outstanding Guest Actress in a Comedy Series	Margaret Cho	Nominated	
Primetime Creative Arts Emmy Awards	2012	Outstanding Single-Camera Picture Editing for a Comedy Series	Ken Eluto (for "The Tuxedo Begins")	Nominated	
Primetime Creative Arts Emmy Awards	2012	Outstanding Single-Camera Picture Editing for a Comedy Series	Meg Reticker (for "Leap Day")	Nominated	
Primetime Creative Arts Emmy Awards	2012	Outstanding Music Composition for a Series (Original Dramatic Score)	Jeff Richmond (for "The Tuxedo Begins")	Nominated	
Primetime Creative Arts Emmy Awards	2012	Outstanding Special Class – Short-Format Nonfiction Programs	Tina Fey, Eric Gurian, Nick Bernardone, Clint Koltveit, and William Sell (for 30 Rock: Ask Tina)	Nominated	
Primetime Creative Arts Emmy Awards	2012	Outstanding Special Class – Short-Format Live-Action Entertainment Programs	Eric Gurian, Clint Koltveit, and William Sell (for 30 Rock: The Webisodes)	Nominated	
Primetime Creative Arts Emmy Awards	2012	Outstanding Sound Mixing for a Comedy or Drama Series (Half-Hour) and Animation	Robert Palladino, Martin Brumbach, Josiah Gluck, and William Taylor (for "Live from Studio 6H")	Nominated	
Primetime Creative Arts Emmy Awards	2012	Outstanding Technical Direction, Camerawork, Video Control for a Series	Steven Cimino, Barry Frischer, John Pinto, Charlie Huntley, Tim Quigley, Eric A. Eisenstein, Richard B. Fox, Marc Bloomgarden, Gerard Sava, Jeffrey Dutemple, Susan Noll, and Frank Grisanti (for "Live from Studio 6H (West Coast Version)")	Nominated	
Primetime Creative Arts Emmy Awards	2013	Outstanding Special Class – Short-Format Live-Action Entertainment Programs	Eric Gurian, Tina Fey, Clint Koltveit, Bill Sell, and Nick Bernardone (for 30 Rock: The Webisodes)	Nominated	
Primetime Creative Arts Emmy Awards	2013	Outstanding Special Class – Short-Format Nonfiction Programs	Carole Angelo, Eric Gurian, Bill Sell, Nick Bernardone, Clint Koltveit, and Tina Fey (for 30 Rock: The Final Season)	Nominated	
Primetime Creative Arts Emmy Awards	2013	Outstanding Casting for a Comedy Series	Jennifer McNamara-Shroff, Katja Blichfeld, and Jessica Daniels	Won	
Primetime Creative Arts Emmy Awards	2013	Outstanding Guest Actor in a Comedy Series	Will Forte	Nominated	
Primetime Creative Arts Emmy Awards	2013	Outstanding Guest Actress in a Comedy Series	Elaine Stritch	Nominated	
Primetime Creative Arts Emmy Awards	2013	Outstanding Single-Camera Picture Editing for a Comedy Series	Meg Reticker and Ken Eluto (for "Hogcock!" / "Last Lunch")	Nominated	
Primetime Creative Arts Emmy Awards	2013	Outstanding Original Music and Lyrics	Jeff Richmond, Tina Fey, and Tracey Wigfield (for "Rural Juror" from "Hogcock!" / "Last Lunch")	Nominated	
Primetime Creative Arts Emmy Awards	2013	Outstanding Sound Mixing for a Comedy or Drama Series (Half-Hour) and Animation	Griffin Richardson and Tony Pipitone (for "Mazel Tov, Dummies!")	Nominated	
Producers Guild of America Awards	2008	Danny Thomas Producer of the Year Award in Episodic Television – Comedy	30 Rock (Note: Nominees: Robert Carlock, Tina Fey, Marci Klein, Jerry Kupfer, Lorne Michaels, and Jeff Richmond)	Won	
Producers Guild of America Awards	2009	Danny Thomas Producer of the Year Award in Episodic Television – Comedy	30 Rock (Note: Nominees: Robert Carlock, Tina Fey, Marci Klein, Jerry Kupfer, Lorne Michaels, David Miner, and Jeff Richmond)	Won	
Producers Guild of America Awards	2010	Danny Thomas Producer of the Year Award in Episodic Television – Comedy	30 Rock (Note: Nominees: Robert Carlock, Tina Fey, Marci Klein, Jerry Kupfer, Lorne Michaels, David Miner, Jeff Richmond, and Don Scardino)	Won	
Producers Guild of America Awards	2011	Danny Thomas Award for Outstanding Producer of Episodic Television – Comedy	30 Rock (Note: Nominees: Robert Carlock, Tina Fey, Marci Klein, Jerry Kupfer, Lorne Michaels, David Miner, Jeff Richmond, and Don Scardino)	Nominated	
Producers Guild of America Awards	2012	Danny Thomas Award for Outstanding Producer of Episodic Television – Comedy	30 Rock (Note: Nominees: Robert Carlock, Tina Fey, Marci Klein, Jerry Kupfer, Lorne Michaels, David Miner, Jeff Richmond, John Riggi, and Don Scardino)	Nominated	
Producers Guild of America Awards	2013	Danny Thomas Award for Outstanding Producer of Episodic Television – Comedy	30 Rock (Note: Nominees: Irene Burns, Kay Cannon, Robert Carlock, Vali Chandrasekaran, Luke Del Tredici, Tina Fey, Matt Hubbard, Marci Klein, Jerry Kupfer, Lorne Michaels, David Miner, Dylan Morgan, Jeff Richmond, John Riggi, Josh Siegal, and Ron Weiner)	Nominated	
Producers Guild of America Awards	2014	Danny Thomas Award for Outstanding Producer of Episodic Television – Comedy	30 Rock (Note: Nominees: Jack Burditt, Robert Carlock, Luke Del Tredici, Tina Fey, Matt Hubbard, Marci Klein, Jerry Kupfer, Colleen McGuinness, Lorne Michaels, David Miner, Dylan Morgan, Jeff Richmond, Josh Siegal, and Tracey Wigfield)	Nominated	
Satellite Awards	2007	Actor in a Series – Musical or Comedy	Alec Baldwin	Nominated	
Satellite Awards	2007	Actress in a Series – Musical or Comedy	Tina Fey	Nominated	
Satellite Awards	2008	Actor in a Series – Musical or Comedy	Alec Baldwin	Nominated	
Satellite Awards	2008	Actress in a Series – Musical or Comedy	Tina Fey	Nominated	
Satellite Awards	2008	DVD Release of a TV Show	30 Rock: Season 2	Nominated	
Satellite Awards	2008	Television Series – Musical or Comedy	30 Rock	Nominated	
Satellite Awards	2009	Actor in a Series – Musical or Comedy	Alec Baldwin	Nominated	
Satellite Awards	2009	Actress in a Series – Musical or Comedy	Tina Fey	Nominated	
Satellite Awards	2009	Television Series – Musical or Comedy	30 Rock	Nominated	
Satellite Awards	2010	Actor in a Series – Musical or Comedy	Alec Baldwin	Won	
Satellite Awards	2010	Actress in a Series – Musical or Comedy	Tina Fey	Nominated	
Satellite Awards	2010	Television Series – Musical or Comedy	30 Rock	Nominated	
Screen Actors Guild Awards	2007	Outstanding Performance by a Male Actor in a Comedy Series	Alec Baldwin	Won	
Screen Actors Guild Awards	2008	Outstanding Performance by a Female Actor in a Comedy Series	Tina Fey	Won	
Screen Actors Guild Awards	2008	Outstanding Performance by a Male Actor in a Comedy Series	Alec Baldwin	Won	
Screen Actors Guild Awards	2008	Outstanding Performance by an Ensemble in a Comedy Series	30 Rock (Note: Nominees: Scott Adsit, Alec Baldwin, Katrina Bowden, Kevin Brown, Grizz Chapman, Tina Fey, Judah Friedlander, Jane Krakowski, Jack McBrayer, Tracy Morgan, Maulik Pancholy, Keith Powell, and Lonny Ross)	Nominated	
Screen Actors Guild Awards	2009	Outstanding Performance by a Female Actor in a Comedy Series	Tina Fey	Won	
Screen Actors Guild Awards	2009	Outstanding Performance by a Male Actor in a Comedy Series	Alec Baldwin	Won	
Screen Actors Guild Awards	2009	Outstanding Performance by an Ensemble in a Comedy Series	30 Rock (Note: Nominees: Scott Adsit, Alec Baldwin, Katrina Bowden, Tina Fey, Judah Friedlander, Jane Krakowski, Jack McBrayer, Tracy Morgan, Maulik Pancholy, and Keith Powell)	Won	
Screen Actors Guild Awards	2010	Outstanding Performance by a Female Actor in a Comedy Series	Tina Fey	Won	
Screen Actors Guild Awards	2010	Outstanding Performance by a Male Actor in a Comedy Series	Alec Baldwin	Won	
Screen Actors Guild Awards	2010	Outstanding Performance by an Ensemble in a Comedy Series	30 Rock (Note: Nominees: Scott Adsit, Alec Baldwin, Katrina Bowden, Kevin Brown, Grizz Chapman, Tina Fey, Judah Friedlander, Jane Krakowski, John Lutz, Jack McBrayer, Tracy Morgan, and Keith Powell)	Nominated	
Screen Actors Guild Awards	2011	Outstanding Performance by a Female Actor in a Comedy Series	Tina Fey	Nominated	
Screen Actors Guild Awards	2011	Outstanding Performance by a Male Actor in a Comedy Series	Alec Baldwin	Won	
Screen Actors Guild Awards	2011	Outstanding Performance by an Ensemble in a Comedy Series	30 Rock (Note: Nominees: Scott Adsit, Alec Baldwin, Katrina Bowden, Kevin Brown, Grizz Chapman, Tina Fey, Judah Friedlander, Jane Krakowski, John Lutz, Jack McBrayer, Tracy Morgan, Maulik Pancholy, and Keith Powell)	Nominated	
Screen Actors Guild Awards	2012	Outstanding Performance by a Female Actor in a Comedy Series	Tina Fey	Nominated	
Screen Actors Guild Awards	2012	Outstanding Performance by a Male Actor in a Comedy Series	Alec Baldwin	Won	
Screen Actors Guild Awards	2012	Outstanding Performance by an Ensemble in a Comedy Series	30 Rock (Note: Nominees: Scott Adsit, Alec Baldwin, Katrina Bowden, Kevin Brown, Grizz Chapman, Tina Fey, Judah Friedlander, Jane Krakowski, John Lutz, Jack McBrayer, Tracy Morgan, Maulik Pancholy, and Keith Powell)	Nominated	
Screen Actors Guild Awards	2013	Outstanding Performance by a Female Actor in a Comedy Series	Tina Fey	Won	
Screen Actors Guild Awards	2013	Outstanding Performance by a Male Actor in a Comedy Series	Alec Baldwin	Won	
Screen Actors Guild Awards	2013	Outstanding Performance by an Ensemble in a Comedy Series	30 Rock (Note: Nominees: Scott Adsit, Alec Baldwin, Tina Fey, Judah Friedlander, Jane Krakowski, Jack McBrayer, and Tracy Morgan)	Nominated	
Screen Actors Guild Awards	2014	Outstanding Performance by a Female Actor in a Comedy Series	Tina Fey	Nominated	
Screen Actors Guild Awards	2014	Outstanding Performance by a Male Actor in a Comedy Series	Alec Baldwin	Nominated	
Screen Actors Guild Awards	2014	Outstanding Performance by an Ensemble in a Comedy Series	30 Rock (Note: Nominees: Scott Adsit, Alec Baldwin, Katrina Bowden, Kevin Brown, Grizz Chapman, Tina Fey, Judah Friedlander, Jane Krakowski, John Lutz, James Marsden, Jack McBrayer, Tracy Morgan, and Keith Powell)	Nominated	
Teen Choice Awards	2008	Choice TV Actress: Comedy	Tina Fey	Nominated	
Television Critics Association Awards	2007	Individual Achievement in Comedy	Alec Baldwin	Won	
Television Critics Association Awards	2007	Individual Achievement in Comedy	Tina Fey	Nominated	
Television Critics Association Awards	2007	Outstanding Achievement in Comedy	30 Rock	Nominated	
Television Critics Association Awards	2007	Outstanding New Program of the Year	30 Rock	Nominated	
Television Critics Association Awards	2008	Individual Achievement in Comedy	Alec Baldwin	Nominated	
Television Critics Association Awards	2008	Individual Achievement in Comedy	Tina Fey	Won	
Television Critics Association Awards	2008	Outstanding Achievement in Comedy	30 Rock	Won	
Television Critics Association Awards	2009	Individual Achievement in Comedy	Alec Baldwin	Nominated	
Television Critics Association Awards	2009	Individual Achievement in Comedy	Tina Fey	Nominated	
Television Critics Association Awards	2009	Outstanding Achievement in Comedy	30 Rock	Nominated	
Writers Guild of America Awards	2007	Television: Comedy Series	30 Rock (Note: Nominees: Brett Baer, Jack Burditt, Kay Cannon, Robert Carlock, Tina Fey, Dave Finkel, Daisy Gardner, Donald Glover, Matt Hubbard, and John Riggi)	Nominated	
Writers Guild of America Awards	2007	Television: New Series	30 Rock	Nominated	
Writers Guild of America Awards	2008	Television: Comedy Series	30 Rock (Note: Nominees: Brett Baer, Jack Burditt, Kay Cannon, Robert Carlock, Tina Fey, Dave Finkel, Daisy Gardner, Donald Glover, Matt Hubbard, Jon Pollack, John Riggi, Tami Sagher, and Ron Weiner)	Won	
Writers Guild of America Awards	2008	Television: Episodic Comedy	Matt Hubbard (for "Hard Ball")	Nominated	
Writers Guild of America Awards	2009	Television: Comedy Series	30 Rock (Note: Nominees: Jack Burditt, Kay Cannon, Robert Carlock, Tina Fey, Donald Glover, Andrew Guest, Matt Hubbard, Jon Pollack, John Riggi, Tami Sagher, and Ron Weiner)	Won	
Writers Guild of America Awards	2009	Television: Episodic Comedy	Robert Carlock (for "Believe in the Stars")	Nominated	
Writers Guild of America Awards	2009	Television: Episodic Comedy	Andrew Guest and John Riggi (for "Succession")	Won	
Writers Guild of America Awards	2009	Television: Episodic Comedy	Tina Fey (for "Cooter")	Nominated	
Writers Guild of America Awards	2010	Television: Comedy Series	30 Rock (Note: Nominees: Jack Burditt, Kay Cannon, Robert Carlock, Tom Ceraulo, Vali Chandrasekaran, Tina Fey, Donald Glover, Steve Hely, Matt Hubbard, Dylan Morgan, Paula Pell, Jon Pollack, John Riggi, Tami Sagher, Josh Siegal, Ron Weiner, and Tracey Wigfield)	Won	
Writers Guild of America Awards	2010	Television: Episodic Comedy	Robert Carlock (for "Apollo, Apollo")	Won	
Writers Guild of America Awards	2010	Television: Episodic Comedy	Matt Hubbard (for "Reunion")	Nominated	
Writers Guild of America Awards	2011	Outstanding Achievement in Writing Derivative New Media	Jon Haller (for "Strip Pong", "Tear Jerks", and "Brainstorm" from Frank vs. Lutz)	Won	
Writers Guild of America Awards	2011	Television: Comedy Series	30 Rock (Note: Nominees: Jack Burditt, Hannibal Buress, Kay Cannon, Robert Carlock, Tom Ceraulo, Vali Chandrasekaran, Tina Fey, Jon Haller, Steve Hely, Matt Hubbard, Dylan Morgan, Paula Pell, Jon Pollack, John Riggi, Josh Siegal, Ron Weiner, and Tracey Wigfield)	Nominated	
Writers Guild of America Awards	2011	Television: Episodic Comedy	Robert Carlock (for "When It Rains, It Pours")	Won	
Writers Guild of America Awards	2011	Television: Episodic Comedy	Matt Hubbard (for "Anna Howard Shaw Day")	Nominated	
Writers Guild of America Awards	2012	Outstanding Achievement in Writing Derivative New Media	Tom Ceraulo (for "Soft Served!", "Iced!", and "Rokered!" from Jack Donaghy: Executive Superhero)	Nominated	
Writers Guild of America Awards	2012	Television: Comedy Series	30 Rock (Note: Nominees: Jack Burditt, Hannibal Buress, Kay Cannon, Robert Carlock, Tom Ceraulo, Vali Chandrasekaran, Tina Fey, Jon Haller, Matt Hubbard, Dylan Morgan, John Riggi, Josh Siegal, Ron Weiner, and Tracey Wigfield)	Nominated	
Writers Guild of America Awards	2012	Television: Episodic Comedy	Tracey Wigfield (for "Queen of Jordan")	Nominated	
Writers Guild of America Awards	2013	Television: Comedy Series	30 Rock (Note: Nominees: Jack Burditt, Kay Cannon, Robert Carlock, Tom Ceraulo, Vali Chandrasekaran, Luke Del Tredici, Tina Fey, Lauren Gurganous, Matt Hubbard, Colleen McGuinness, Sam Means, Dylan Morgan, Nina Pedrad, John Riggi, Josh Siegal, Ron Weiner, and Tracey Wigfield)	Nominated	
Writers Guild of America Awards	2013	Television: Episodic Comedy	Luke Del Tredici (for "Leap Day")	Nominated	
Writers Guild of America Awards	2014	Television: Comedy Series	30 Rock (Note: Nominees: Jack Burditt, Robert Carlock, Tom Ceraulo, Luke Del Tredici, Tina Fey, Lang Fisher, Matt Hubbard, Colleen McGuinness, Sam Means, Dylan Morgan, Nina Pedrad, Josh Siegal, and Tracey Wigfield)	Nominated	
Writers Guild of America Awards	2014	Television: Episodic Comedy	Jack Burditt and Robert Carlock (for "Hogcock!")	Won	
