= Calvin Klein =

American fashion designer (born 1942)

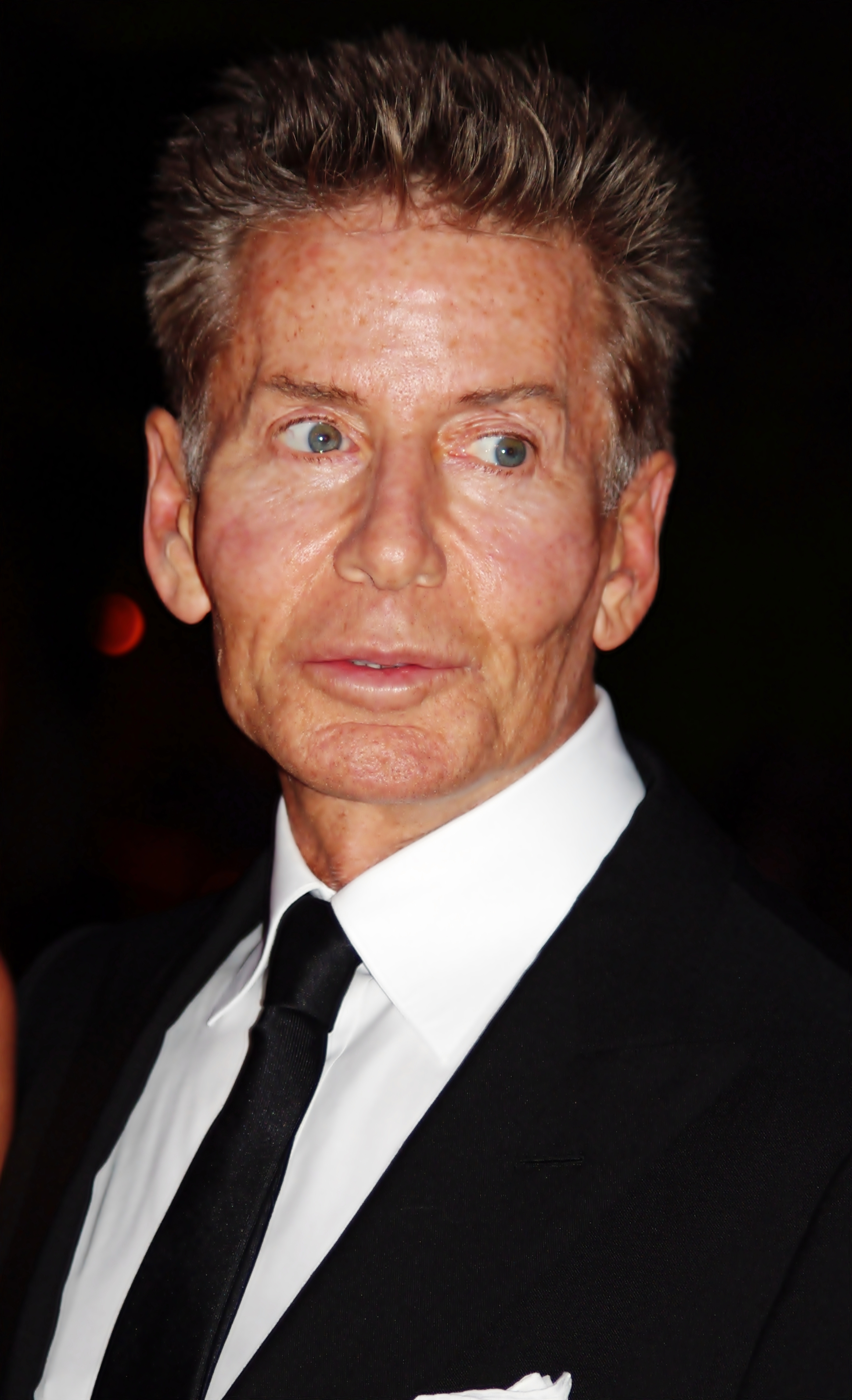
- Klein in 2011
- Born: Calvin Richard Klein; November 19, 1942 (age 84); New York City, U.S.
- Education: Fashion Institute of Technology
- Occupation: Fashion designer
- Label: Calvin Klein Inc.
- Spouses: Jayne Centre (m. 1965; div. 1974) Kelly Rector (m. 1986; div. 2006)
- Partners: Nicholas Gruber (2010–2012); Kevin Baker (2016–present)
- Children: Marci Klein

Calvin Richard Klein (Note: /klaɪn/ KLYNE) (born November 19, 1942) is an American fashion designer. In 1968, he launched the company that later became Calvin Klein. In addition to clothing, he has also given his name to a range of perfumes, watches, and jewelry.

== Early life and education ==
Klein was born on November 19, 1942 in the Bronx, New York City, to a Jewish family. He is the son of Flore (née Stern; 1909–2006) and Leo Klein. His father was born in Boiany, Austria-Hungary (now Ukraine) and had immigrated to New York. He was born in the United States, to immigrants from Galicia and Bukovina, Austria-Hungary (now Ukraine/Romania).

As a child, Klein attended J.H.S. 80 in the Bronx. He earned a diploma at the High School of Art and Design in Manhattan. After graduation, he attended New York's Fashion Institute of Technology, leaving for six months after his first year, before returning to finish his degree.

He was one of several design leaders raised in the Jewish community in the Bronx, along with Ralph Lauren and Robert Denning.

== Career ==
Klein did his apprenticeship in 1962 at an old line cloak-and-suit manufacturer, Dan Millstein, and he spent five years designing at other New York City shops.

In 1968, Klein launched his first company with his childhood friend Barry K. Schwartz. When Schwartz was considering buying a supermarket in Harlem, Klein informed him that he wanted to "design medium priced clothes with a clean look." "When I said I needed money to start out on my own, he said 'You've got it,'" Klein said. Schwartz also became his business manager. After leaving his manufacturing job, Klein set up an office in a hotel room, began designing coats, and eventually brought his creations to Bonwit Teller, where a buyer liked them.

He became a protégé of Baron de Gunzburg, who introduced him to the New York elite fashion scene before he had his first mainstream success with the launch of his first jeans line. He was immediately recognized for his talent after his first major showing at New York Fashion Week. He was hailed as the new Yves Saint Laurent (YSL), and he was noted for his clean lines.

In 1974, Klein designed the tight-fitting signature jeans that went on to gross $200,000 in their first week of sales.

In 1998, Klein participated in a celebrity reading of The Emperor's New Clothes, for The Starbright Foundation, to benefit ill children.

== Personal life ==
Klein is a supporter of the U.S. Democratic Party, having given over $250,000 to candidates and PACs since 1980.

=== Relationships ===
Klein married Jayne Centre, a textile designer, in 1964. Despite going to the same high school and growing up next door in New York, Klein and Centre did not meet and begin dating until college. They have a daughter, television producer Marci Klein, who is best known for her work on NBC's Saturday Night Live and 30 Rock. The couple divorced in 1974.

In September 1986, Klein married his assistant, Kelly Rector, while the couple were on a buying trip in Rome. Later, she became a well-known socialite photographer. After separating in 1996, the couple's divorce was finalized 10 years later in April 2006.

From 2010 to 2012, Klein dated model Nicholas Gruber, who is 47 years younger. Since 2016, he has been in a relationship with model Kevin Baker.

=== Homes ===
For many years, Klein owned a home in Fire Island Pines, New York on Fire Island. He hosted friends, such as artist Andy Warhol, Studio 54 owner Steve Rubell, fashion designer Chester Weinberg, and media mogul David Geffen. Although he sold the property in 1995, it is still known as "The Calvin Klein House".

In 2003, Klein bought an ocean-front estate in Southampton, New York on Long Island and demolished it to build a $75 million glass-and-concrete mansion. In 2015, he put his Miami Beach, Florida mansion on the market for $16 million. The Florida home sold for $12,850,000 in February 2017. In June 2015, Klein bought a mansion in Los Angeles, California for $25 million.

== Awards and honors ==
In 1983, he was placed on the International Best Dressed List. Also, in 1981, 1983, and 1993, he received an award from the CFDA.

Klein received an honorary doctorate from the Fashion Institute of Technology, in 2003.

== In popular culture ==
Klein made a cameo appearance in season 3, episode 15 ("The Bubble") of the television series 30 Rock.

Alessandro Nivola portrayed Klein in the 2026 television series Love Story.

== See also ==
- High culture
- LGBT culture in New York City
- List of LGBT people from New York City
