= Scott Adsit =

American actor and comedian

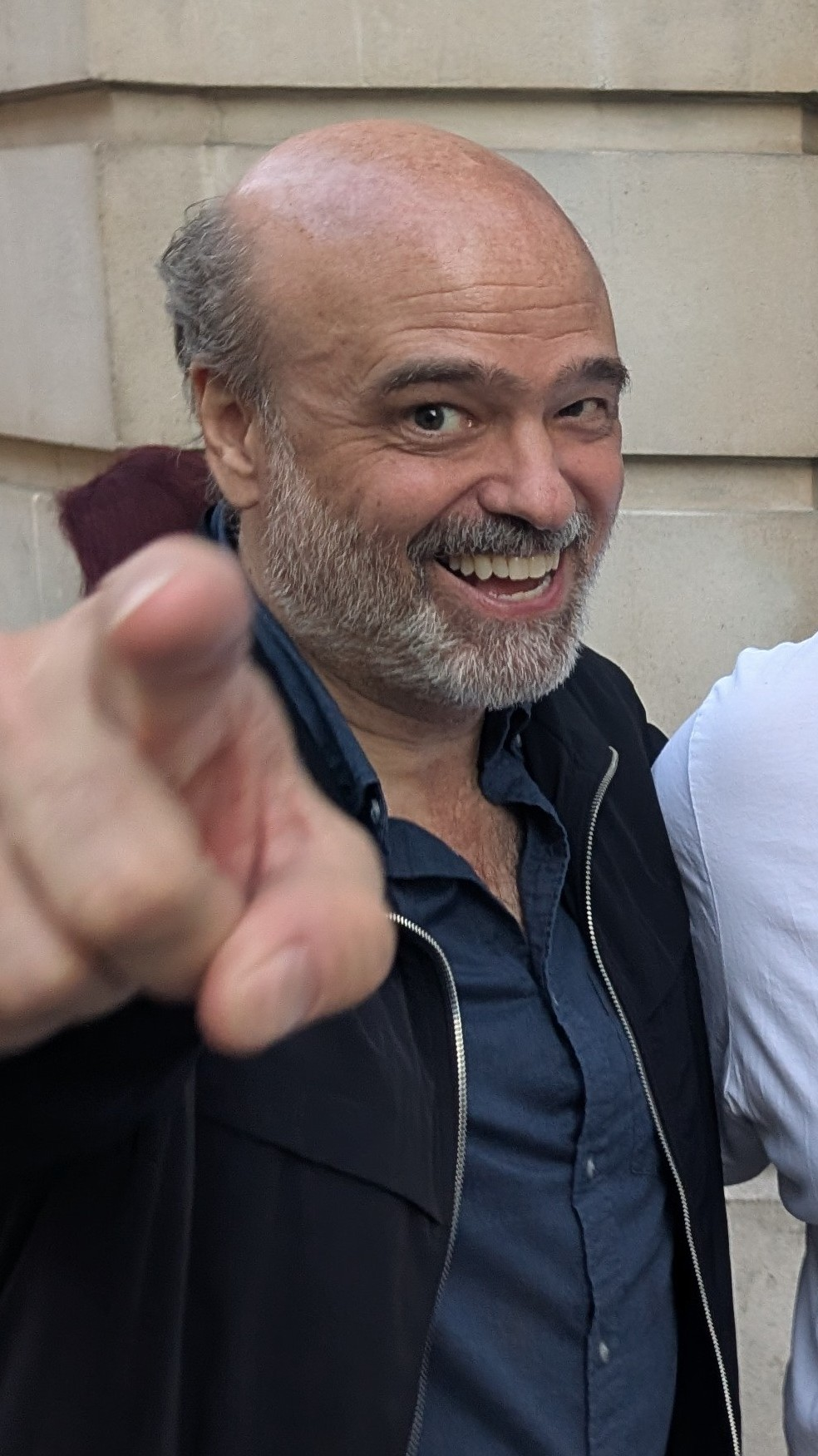
- Adsit in 2025
- Born: Robert Scott Adsit; November 26, 1965 (age 60); Northbrook, Illinois, U.S.
- Education: Columbia College Chicago
- Occupations: Actor; comedian; writer
- Years active: 1987–present

Comedy career
- Medium: Theater; improvisational comedy; television; film; radio drama; radio comedy
- Genres: Satire / political satire; improvisational comedy

Robert Scott Adsit (born November 26, 1965) is an American actor, comedian, and writer. Born and raised in the Chicago suburbs, Adsit joined the mainstage cast of Chicago's The Second City in 1994 after attending Columbia College Chicago. He appeared in several revues, including Paradigm Lost for which he won The Joseph Jefferson Award for Best Actor in a Comedy.

From 2005 to 2008, he codirected, co-wrote and coproduced the Adult Swim stop-motion animation program Moral Orel with Dino Stamatopoulos and Jay Johnston. He also voiced several characters and was nominated for an Annie Award for his work as Clay Puppington, Orel's father. After the success of Moral Orel, Adsit and Stamatopoulos worked together again on the stop-motion animation series Mary Shelley's Frankenhole (2010–2012).

Adsit is known for his role as Pete Hornberger, the well-meaning but jaded producer, on the NBC sitcom 30 Rock, which won a Screen Actors Guild Award for Outstanding Performance by an Ensemble in a Comedy Series in 2008. In 2014, Adsit voiced the robot Baymax in the Disney animated film Big Hero 6, which he reprised in both Big Hero 6: The Series (2017–2021) and the Disney+ series Baymax!

== Early life ==
Adsit was born in Northbrook, Illinois on November 26, 1965, the son of Genevieve "Genny" (née Butz) and Andrew Scott Adsit, a real estate attorney. He attended Glenbrook North High School, where he recalled being "a bit of a class clown", and attended Indiana's DePauw University for one semester. He then attended Columbia College Chicago, where acting teacher Sheldon Patinkin encouraged him to join the city's famed improv troupe, The Second City.

== Career ==
=== 1987–1998 ===
Adsit joined Second City in 1987, and became part of its mainstage cast in 1994. He appeared in several Joseph Jefferson Award-winning revues, including Piñata Full of Bees and Paradigm Lost for which he won The Jeff Award for Best Actor in a Comedy. A sketch he performed with future Saturday Night Live head writer Adam McKay, "Gump," was included as one of Second City's all-time best in the theater's 25th anniversary compilation. He appeared in the 1997 PBS documentary about the process of creating the Second City review, Paradigm Lost, Second to None along with castmates Tina Fey, Kevin Dorff, Rachel Dratch, Jenna Jolovitz and Jim Zulevic.

In 1996, he portrayed an alcoholic and drug-addicted father in Minnesota's Hazelden Substance Abuse Clinic short-subject production, Reflections From The Heart Of A Child. This 26-minute video/DVD feature has become required curriculum in most DWI Repeat Offender classes and substance abuse rehabilitation clinics across the U.S. In 1997, Adsit recorded the voices for the King of Payne, Sir Psycho, The Duke of Bourbon, and Merlin for Williams' Medieval Madness pinball machine. Adsit co-wrote the game's recorded dialog with fellow Second City cast member, Kevin Dorff. Dorff and Tina Fey also played the character voices in the game.

In 1998, Adsit moved to Los Angeles after an invitation from his college friend Dino Stamatopoulos to work on a pilot about the backstage antics of a television sketch-comedy variety show. The pilot did not materialize as a show, but Adsit stayed in California and began working in bit parts and commercials. That same year, he appeared as a cast member in the renowned sketch comedy program, Mr. Show. He also plagued the band Tenacious D as a neighbor and a demon in their HBO show.

=== 2000s ===
In 2001, he starred in an episode of Friends, "The One with Ross and Monica's Cousin" in season 7.

From 2005 to 2008, he co-directed, co-wrote and co-produced the Adult Swim show Moral Orel with Stamatopoulos and Jay Johnston. He also provided the voice of Orel's father, Clay Puppington, as well as his best friend, Doughy, Link McMissins, Art Posabule, Mr. Christein, Junior Christein, Doctor Potterswheel, Billy Figurelli, Mrs. Figurelli and Tiny Tina, among others. He was nominated for an Annie Award for his work as Clay. Adsit also had a minor role in The Office episode "Conflict Resolution" as a photographer. Adsit also had a small role in the movie Kicking & Screaming, starring Will Ferrell, where he played the coach of a rival team.

In 2005, he received a call from former Second City castmate Tina Fey. "Tina called and said, 'I'm working on a show, and there's a part I'm writing with you in mind, so keep your schedule open next year.' So I did," Adsit recalled in 2009. In a twist of fate, he also auditioned for Aaron Sorkin's Studio 60 on the Sunset Strip, another series about the behind-the-scenes drama of a variety show. "My manager said, 'There's a good possibility you're going to be offered both of these, so which are you going to go with? You have to tell me now,'" Adsit said. "I said, 'Tina is the lady from Weekend Update that riles a lot of people, and Aaron Sorkin just finished The West Wing; he's the golden boy.'" Ultimately, Adsit picked his friend: "I had to go with somebody I know and respect. I went with Tina."

In 2006, he joined the cast of 30 Rock, Fey's show, as Pete Hornberger, a longtime friend of Fey's character, Liz Lemon, and well-meaning but frequently terrified producer of TGS with Tracy Jordan, a fictitious sketch comedy series. The show ran for seven seasons and was a critical smash, earning 103 Emmy nominations.

In 2007, Adsit starred together with Brendon Small in Let's Fish, a pilot for Adult Swim, but the pilot did not become an official series.

=== 2010s ===
After the success of Moral Orel, Adsit and Dino Stamatopoulos worked together again on their newest stop-motion animation series Mary Shelley's Frankenhole, which first aired on Adult Swim on June 27, 2010 and ran for a total of 20 episodes over 2 seasons. Adsit directed, wrote, produced and provided many of the lead voices. In June 2010, Adsit hosted a panel featuring comic book writers Dan Slott, Frank Tieri, and Chris Claremont at HeroCon in Charlotte, North Carolina. In 2012 a character named Agent Scott Adsit appeared as an agent of S.H.I.E.L.D. in Marvel's Deadpool, and has since become a recurring character in the title.

Adsit also guest starred as the "Guest Bailiff" in three episodes of John Hodgman's podcast Judge John Hodgman. Adsit starred as himself in John Hodgman's Netflix comedy special John Hodgman: Ragnarok.

Adsit voiced the huggable robot Baymax in the 2014 Disney animated film Big Hero 6. Producer Roy Conli said "The fact that his character is a robot limits how you can emote, but Scott was hilarious. He took those boundaries and was able to shape the language in a way that makes you feel Baymax's emotion and sense of humor. Scott was able to relay just how much Baymax cares."

Adsit joined the Season 3 cast of the Adult Swim live-action TV series The Heart, She Holler as the corrupt Sheriff, starring alongside Amy Sedaris. Paste Magazine stated that "Sedaris and Adsit, two relatively new co-stars, have great chemistry".

Adsit plays Sheriff Ridge in Wolverine: The Long Night, a scripted podcast serial.

He also had a recurring role as news anchor Greg Hart in the HBO political sitcom Veep.

Adsit performs live in the show John and Scott with John Lutz and in Adsit and Eveleth with Jet Eveleth.

Adsit continues to act, improvise and teach at I.O. West and the Upright Citizens Brigade.

== Filmography ==
=== Film ===
Year	Title	Role	Other Notes
1998	Temporary Girl	Seth the Agent	
2001	Town and Country	Cab Driver	
2001	Lovely and Amazing	Man at Phone	
2002	Run Ronnie Run	Police Negotiator	
2003	Melvin Goes to Dinner	Man	
2003	The Italian Job	Actor Rehearsing in Car	
2003	Grand Theft Parsons	Music Expert	
2004	The Terminal	Cab Driver	
2004	L.A. Twister	Technician	
2004	Without a Paddle	Greasy Man	
2004	Admissions	Harvard Interviewer	
2005	Be Cool	Program Director	
2005	Kicking and Screaming	Stew	
2005	Bad News Bears	Umpire	
2006	I Want Someone to Eat Cheese With	Big Galoot	
2006	Accepted	Drop-Off Dad	
2006	For Your Consideration	First AD	
2007	Dante's Inferno	Judge Minos	Voice
2007	The Hammer	Cop	
2007	Mr. Woodcock	Cheesy Salesman	
2008	Turnover	Dr. Ruderman	
2009	The Informant!	Sid Hulse	
2010	Last Night	Stuart	
2011	Arthur	Gummy Bear Man	
2012	The Discoverers	Harry Hardcore	
2013	We're the Millers	Doctor	
2013	A Case of You	Cheesy Announcer	
2014	Appropriate Behavior	Ken	
2014	St. Vincent	David	
2014	Big Hero 6	Baymax	Voice
2015	Uncle Nick	Kevin	
2023	Once Upon a Studio	Baymax	Voice; short film
2024	Megamind vs. the Doom Syndicate	Pierre Pressure	Voice
TBA	What the F*ck Is My Password	TBA	Filming

=== Television ===
Year	Title	Role	Other Notes
1996	Early Edition	Cab Driver	Episode: "Thief Swipes Mayor's Dog"
1997–1998	Early Edition	Grabowski	2 episodes
1998	Mr. Show with Bob and David	Various	6 episodes
1999	Tenacious D	The Writer	Episode: "The Greatest Song in the World"
1999	Two Guys, a Girl and a Pizza Place	Kevin	Episode: "Two Guys, a Girl and Barenaked Ladies"
2000	Felicity	Professor Howard Morrison	Episode: "Final Touches"
2002	Friends	Director	Episode: "The One with Ross and Monica's Cousin"
2002	Malcolm in the Middle	Attorney	Episode: "Houseboat"
2002	Curb Your Enthusiasm	Joel Reynolds	Episode: "The Acupuncturist"
2002	TV Funhouse	Professor	Episode: "Chinese New Year's Day"
2002	Dharma & Greg	Howard	Episode: "With a Little Help from My Friend"
2002	MADtv	Stagehand	Episode #7.5
2002	Ally McBeal	Dr. Ted Slipp	Episode: "Blowin' in the Wind"
2002	Still Standing	Mike	Episode: "Still Reading"
2003	Kingpin	Male Addict	TV Miniseries
2003	Alias	Pierre Lagravenese	Episode: "Reunion"
2003	Comedy Central Laughs for Life Telethon 2003	CEO Harold Barbour	TV special
2003	CSI: Miami	Izzy	Episode: "Body Count"
2003	The Man Show	Doctor	Episode: "Wheel of Destiny"
2004	Monk	Medical Examiner	Episode: "Mr. Monk Gets Fired"
2004	Comedy Central Laughs for Life Telethon 2004	Colbert's High School Friend	TV special
2004	Charmed	Man in Dress / Cursed Wood Nymph	Episode: "Spin City"
2004	The Drew Carey Show	Mitch	Episode: "Baby Makes Stress"
2004	Huff	Doug Columbo	Episode: "Cold Day in Shanghai"
2005	Malcolm in the Middle	Joe	Episode: "Health Insurance"
2005	Stacked	Ray	Episode: "Crazy Ray"
2005–2006	Robot Chicken	Wimpy, Dean, Buddha, Shamrock Bear, Pinhead, blue Hungry Hippo, action movies narrator	Voice, 4 episodes
2005–2008	Moral Orel	Clay Puppington, Various Voices	Voice
2006	Monk	Medical Examiner Gordo	Episode: "Mr. Monk Goes to a Fashion Show"
2006	The Office	Photographer	Episode: "Conflict Resolution" (2:21)
2006	The Colbert Report	Admiral Allendorfer	Episode: "John Sexton"
2006–2013	30 Rock	Pete Hornberger	TV series: 100 episodes Screen Actors Guild Award for Outstanding Performance by an Ensemble in a Comedy Series
2007	Let's Fish	Don	TV Pilot
2008	Aqua Teen Hunger Force	Hoppy Bunny and Drewbacca	Voice
2008	Law & Order: Special Victims Unit	Dwight Lomax	Episode: "Authority"
2010	Big Lake	John the Baptist	1 episode
2010	Delocated	Dog Food Executive	1 episode
2010	Mary Shelley's Frankenhole	Professor Polidori, The Creature, Dr. Moreau, Thomas Jefferson, Adolf Hitler, et al.	Voice
2013	John Hodgman: Ragnarok	Himself	Netflix special
2015–2017	Harvey Beaks	Irving Beaks	Voice: 38 episodes
2015	Neon Joe, Werewolf Hunter	Sunny Cocoa	
2015	W/ Bob & David	Various	2 episodes
2015–2019	Veep	Greg Hart	8 episodes
2016	Person of Interest	Max Greene	Episode: "QSO"
2017	Unbreakable Kimmy Schmidt	Dale Bortz	1 episode
2017–2021	Big Hero 6: The Series	Baymax, others	Voice
2017	Gap Year	Todd	1 episode
2017	Girlboss	Chuck	1 episode
2018	The Goldbergs	Vinny Geary	3 episodes
2020	The Walking Dead: World Beyond	Tony Delmado	Recurring
2021–2023	Teenage Euthanasia	Various characters	Voice: 13 episodes
2022	Baymax!	Baymax	Voice; Disney+ Miniseries
2023	Awkwafina Is Nora from Queens	Constantine	2 episodes
2023	The Mindful Adventures of Unicorn Island	Various characters	Voice: 10 episodes
2023	Shape Island	Triangle	Voice: 10 episodes
2023	Carol & the End of the World	Greg	Voice: 2 episodes
2024	Megamind Rules!	Pierre Pressure	Voice: 9 episodes
2024	Elsbeth	Chazz Milano	Episode: "One Angry Woman"
2026	Law & Order	Brian Leavy	Episode: "Never Say Goodbye"

=== Video games ===
Year	Title	Role
2014	Disney Infinity: Marvel Super Heroes	Baymax
2015	Disney Infinity 3.0	Baymax
2019	Kingdom Hearts III	Baymax
2024	Fortnite Battle Royale	Baymax
