= Actor Award for Outstanding Performance by a Male Actor in a Comedy Series =

American award for acting in television

Actor Award for Best Actor in a Comedy Series
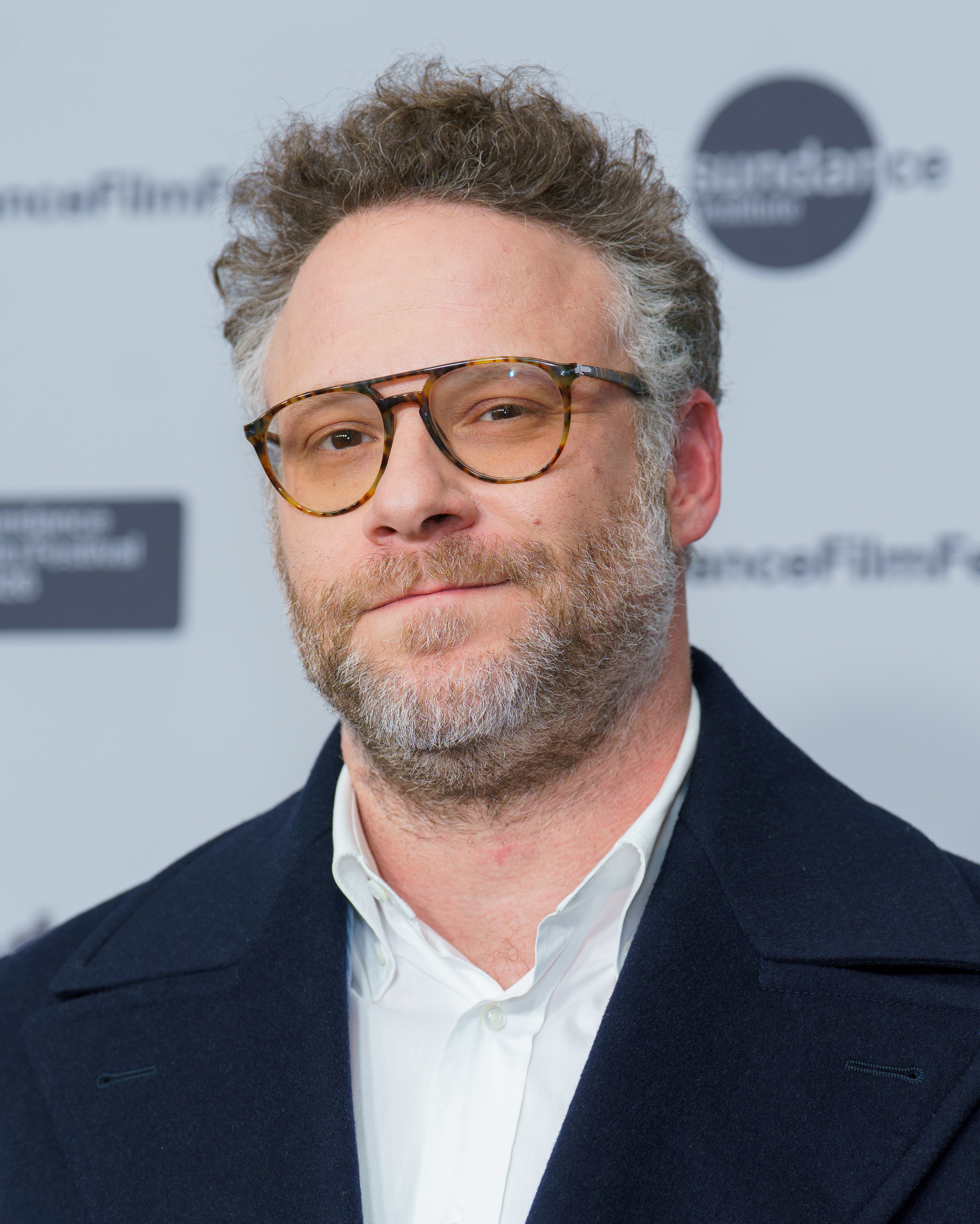
- The 2025 recipient: Seth Rogen
- Awarded for: Outstanding Performance by a Male Actor in a Comedy Series
- Location: Los Angeles, California
- Presented by: SAG-AFTRA
- Currently held by: Seth Rogen for The Studio (2025)
- Website: sagawards.org

The Actor Award for Outstanding Performance by a Male Actor in a Comedy Series is an award given by the Screen Actors Guild to honor the finest acting achievements by a male actor on a comedy television series. The award is for both lead and supporting characters.

Tony Shalhoub holds the record for most nominations in his category with nine. Alec Baldwin, Kelsey Grammer, and David Hyde Pierce each have eight nominations. Alec Baldwin holds the record for most wins in this category portraying Jack Donaghy in 30 Rock with seven consecutive wins.

== Winners and nominees ==
indicates the winner.

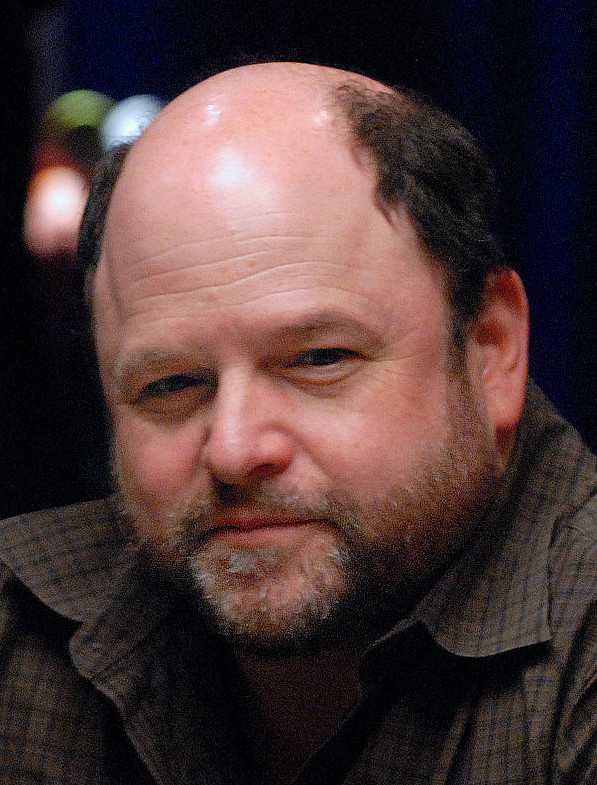
Jason Alexander was the first recipient of this award playing George Costanza in Seinfeld (1994)

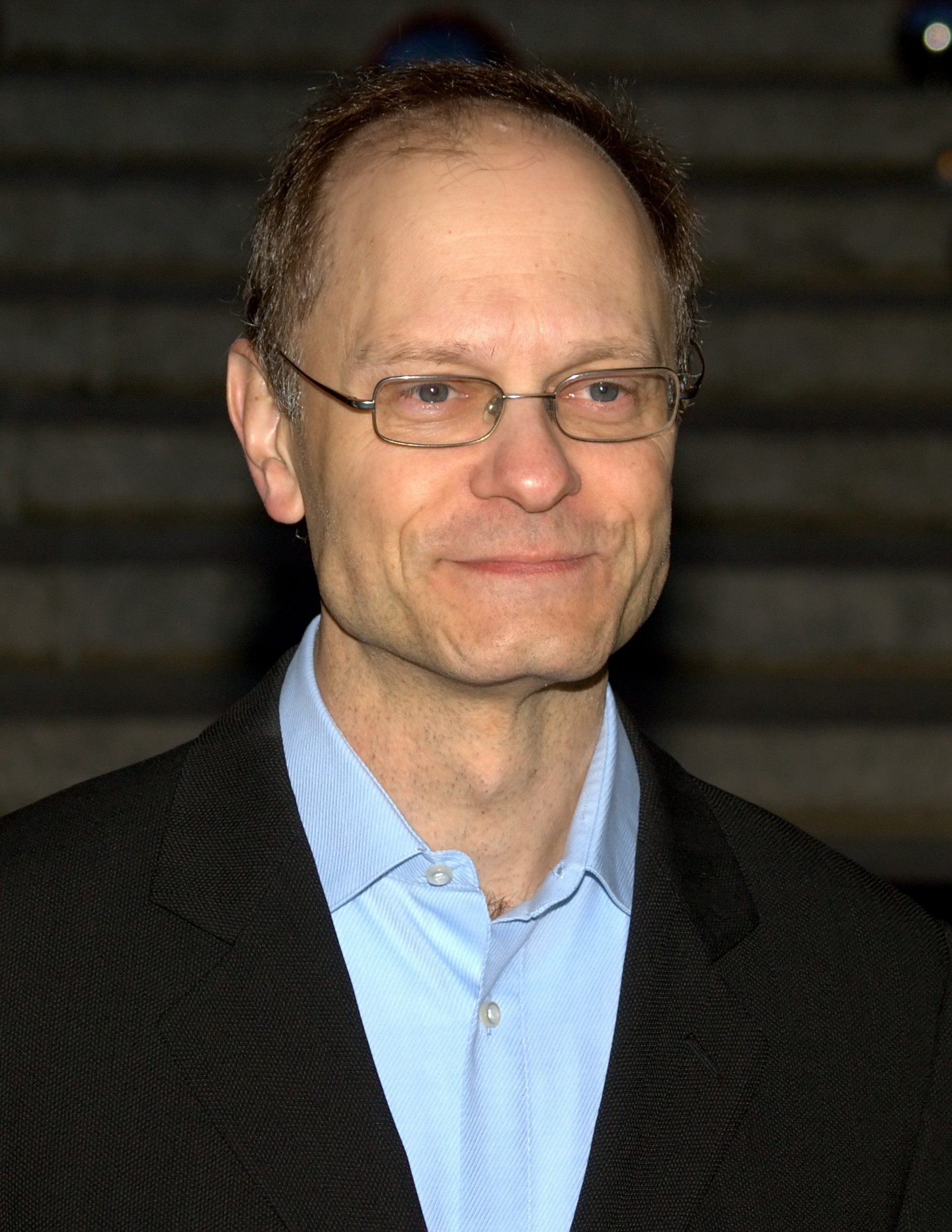
David Hyde Pierce won playing Niles Crane in Frasier (1995)

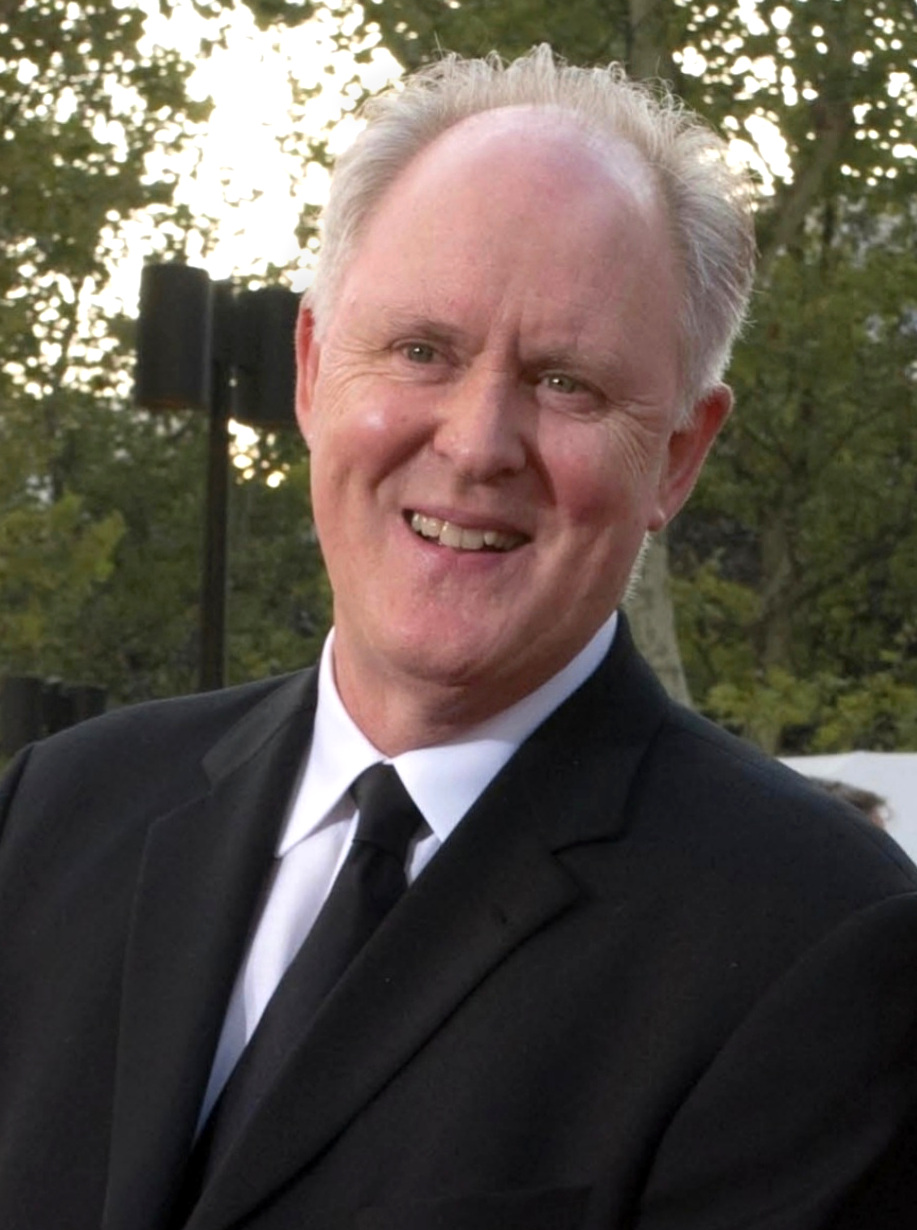
John Lithgow won twice playing Dick Solomon in 3rd Rock from the Sun (1996, 1997)

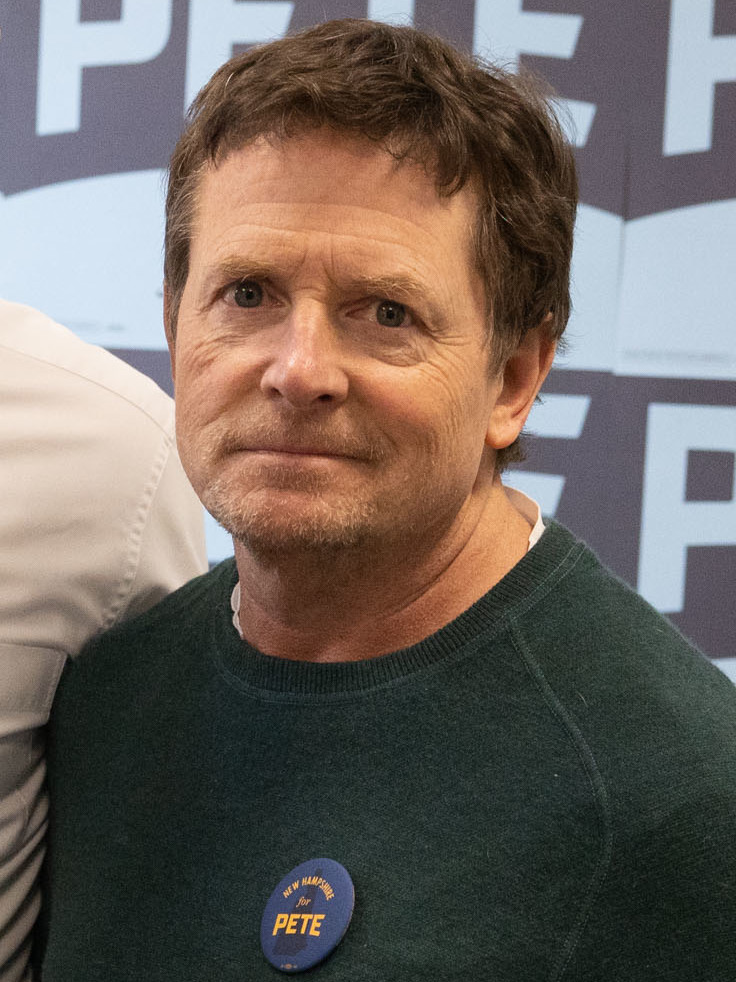
Michael J. Fox won twice for playing Mike Flaherty in Spin City (1998, 1999)

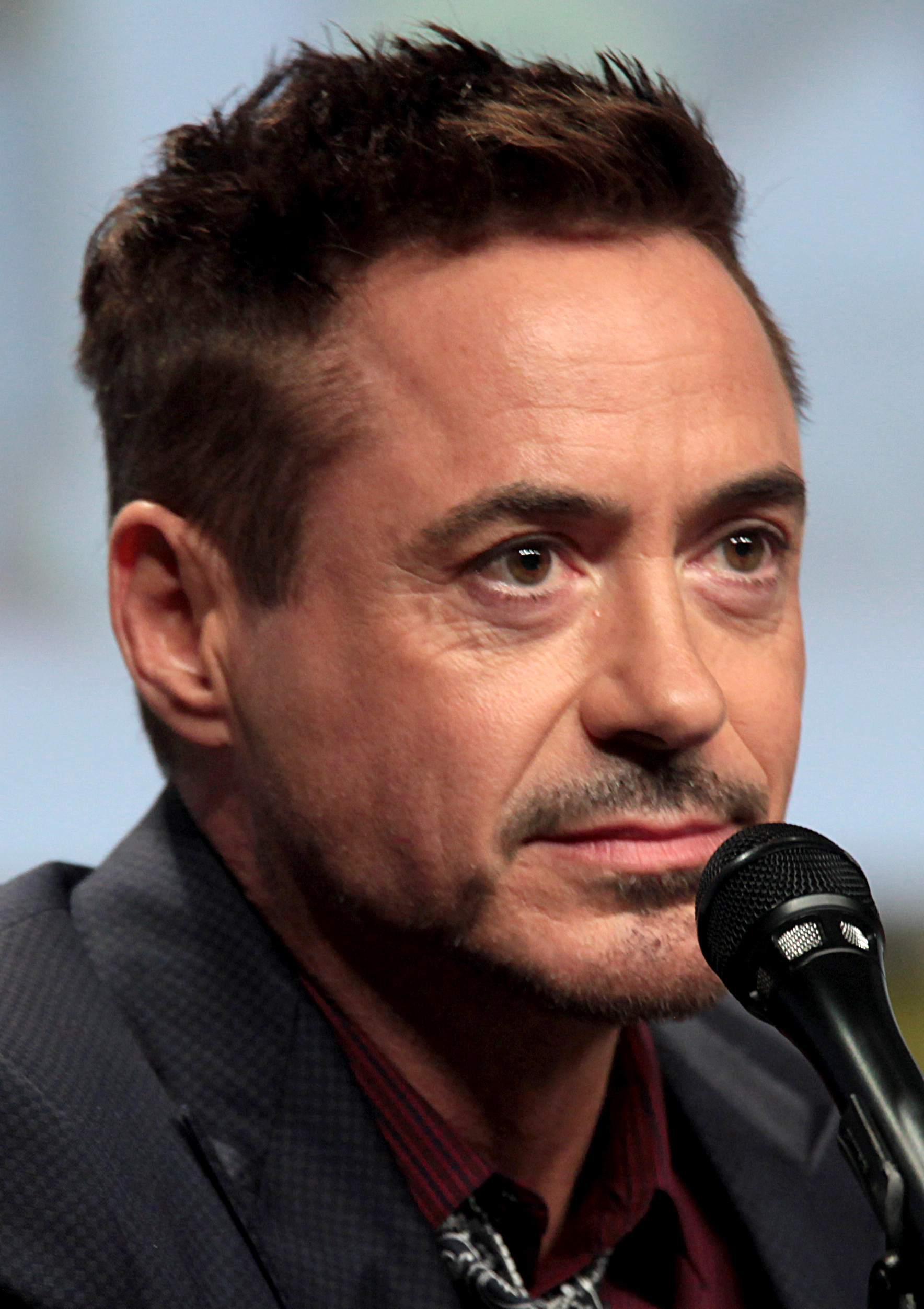
Robert Downey Jr. won for Ally McBeal (2000)

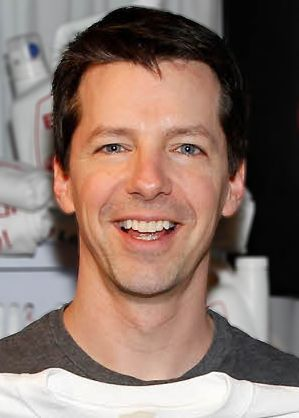
Sean Hayes won thrice playing Jack McFarland in Will & Grace

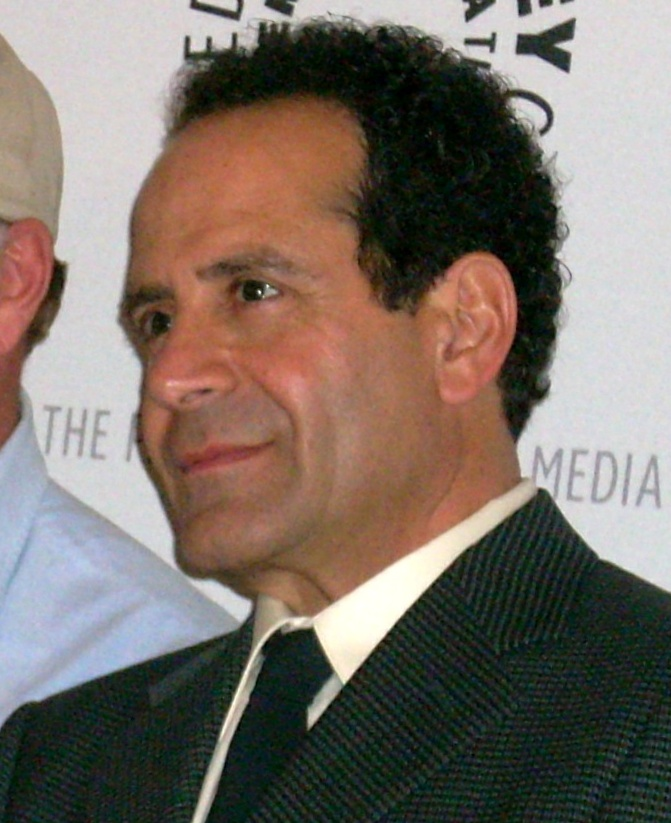
Tony Shalhoub won four times, twice for playing Adrian Monk in Monk and twice for playing Abe Weissman in The Marvelous Mrs. Maisel

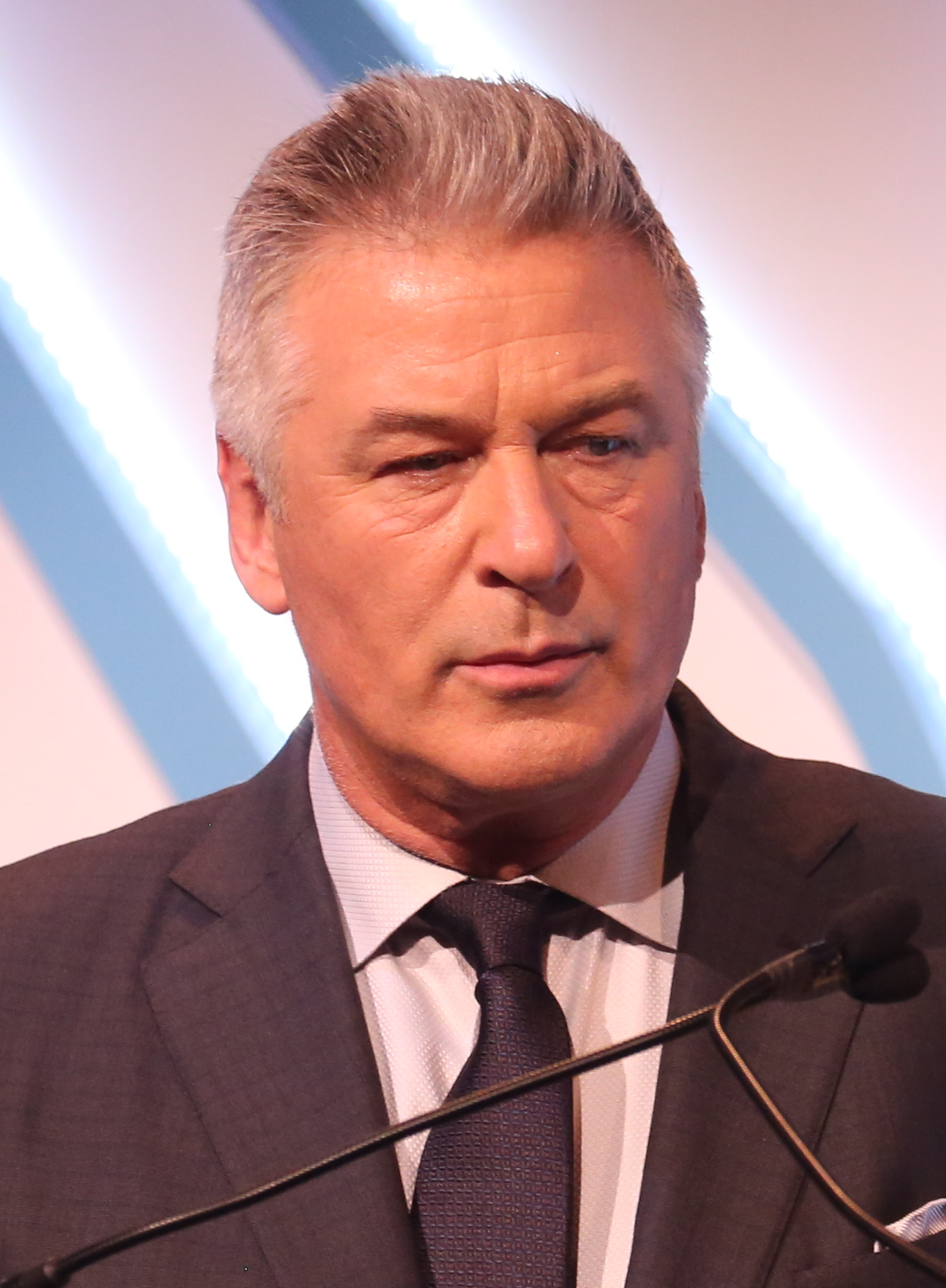
Alec Baldwin holds the record with seven consecutive wins playing Jack Donaghy in 30 Rock (2006–2012)

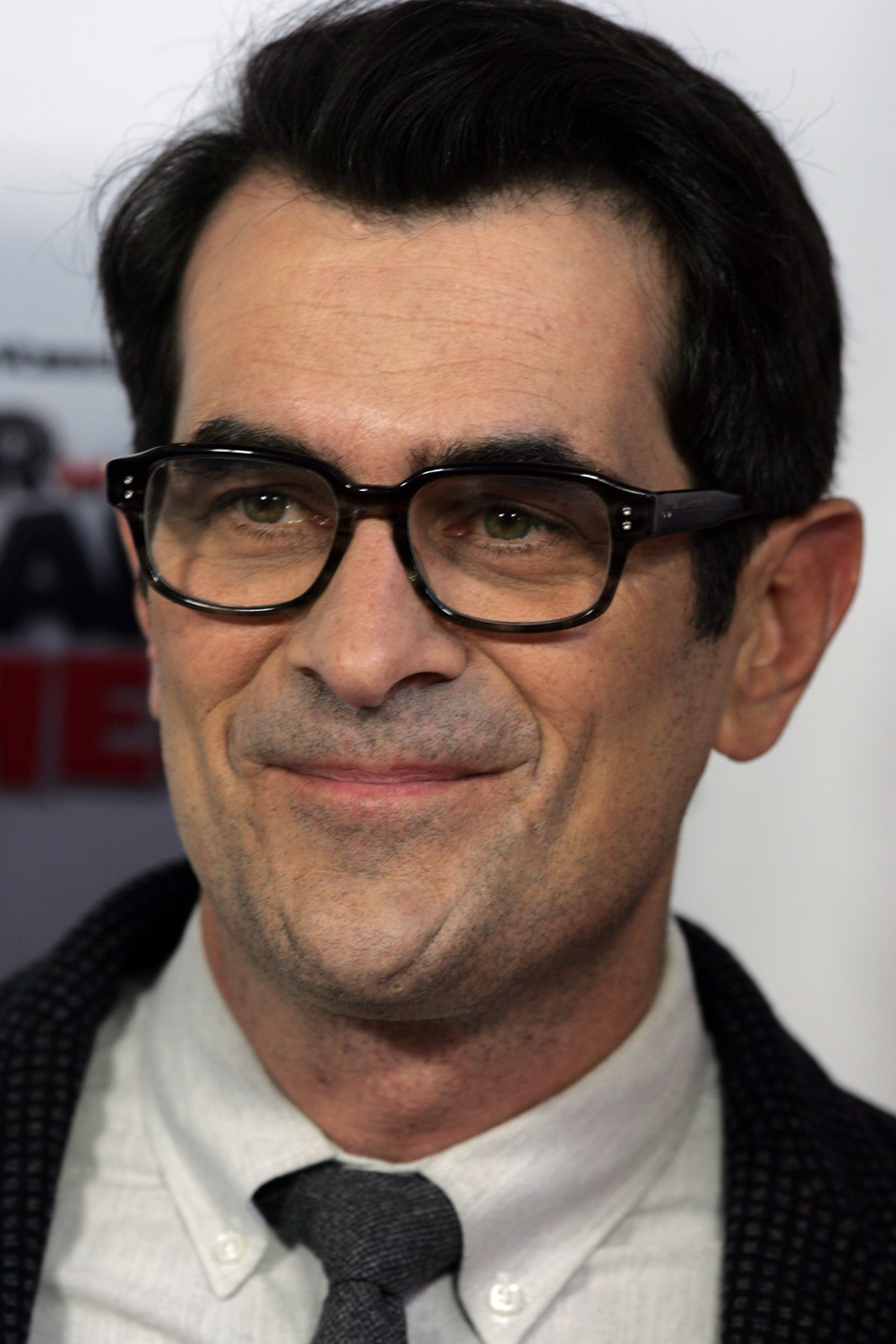
Ty Burrell won for playing Phil Dunphy in Modern Family (2013)

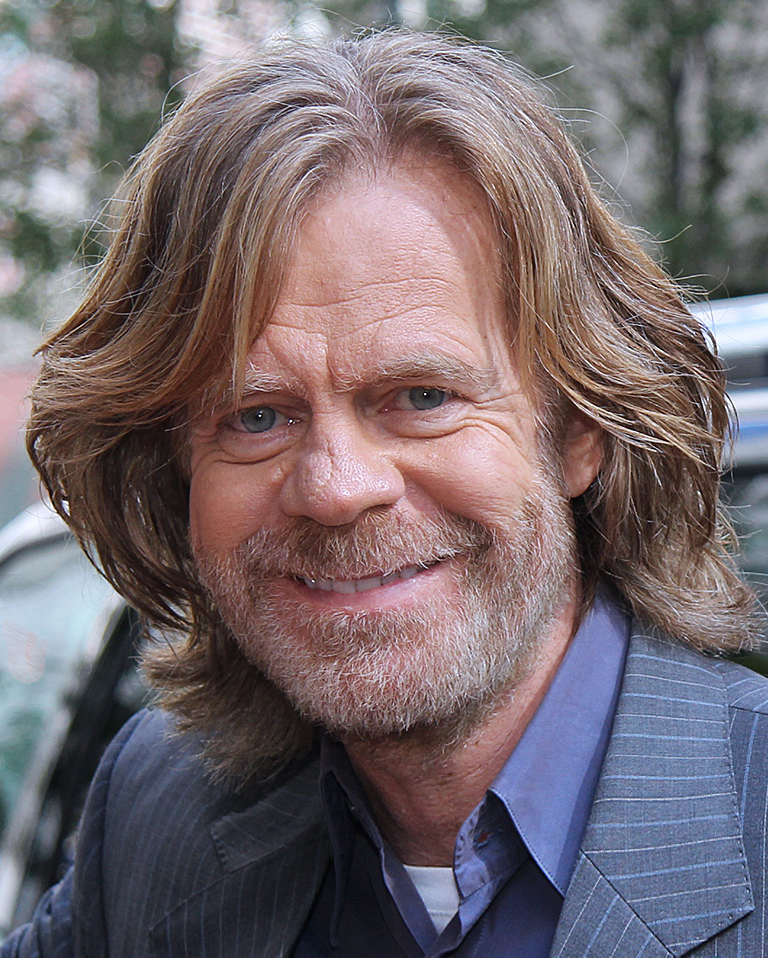
William H. Macy won thrice for playing Frank Gallagher in Shameless (2014, 2016, 2017)

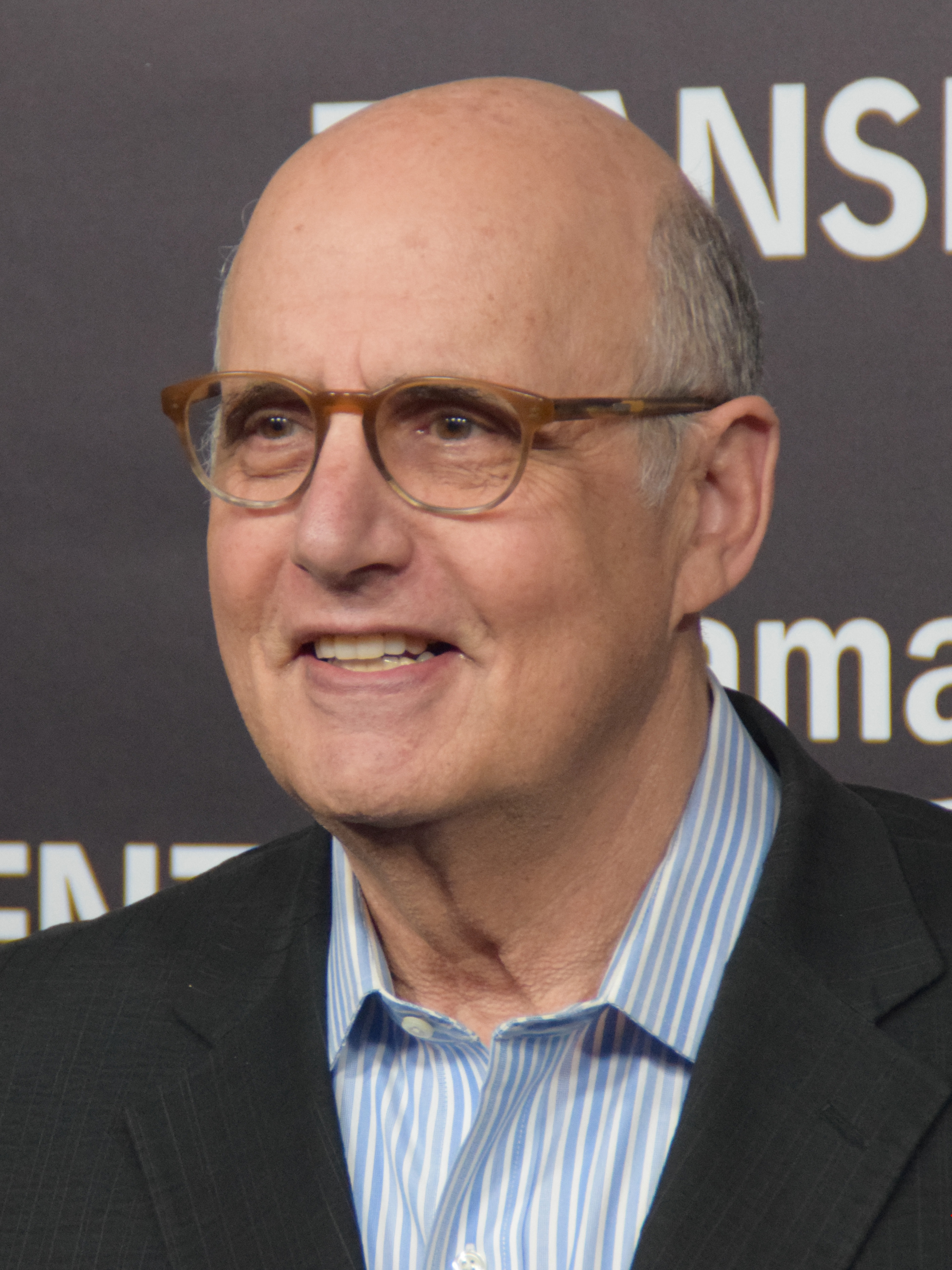
Jeffrey Tambor won for playing Maura Pfefferman in Transparent (2015)

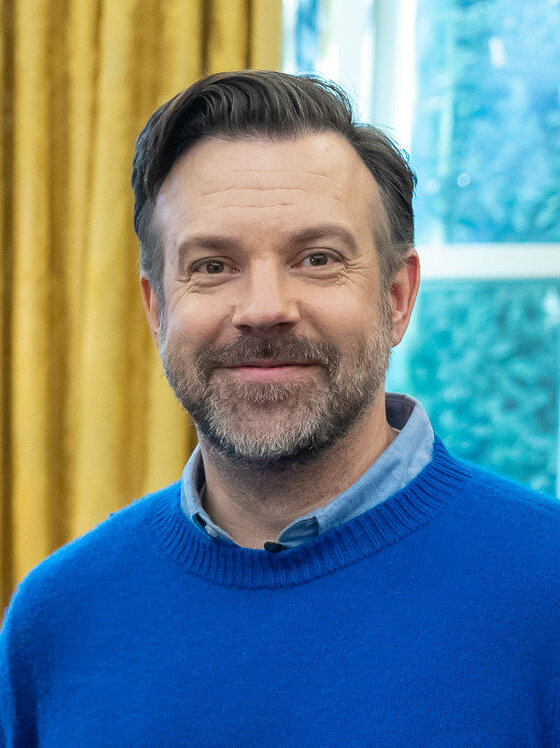
Jason Sudeikis won twice for playing the title role in Ted Lasso (2020, 2021)

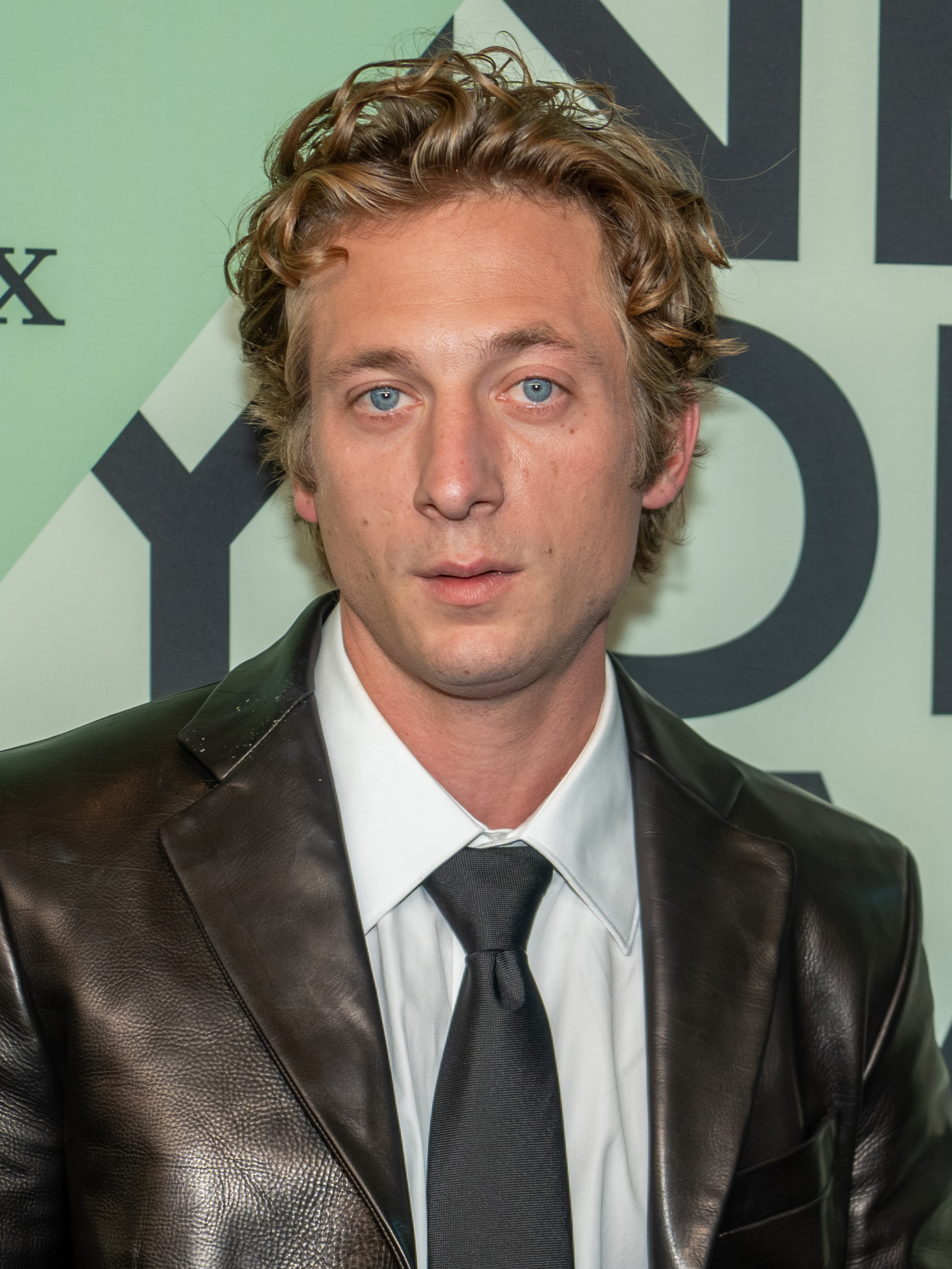
Jeremy Allen White won for The Bear (2022, 2023)

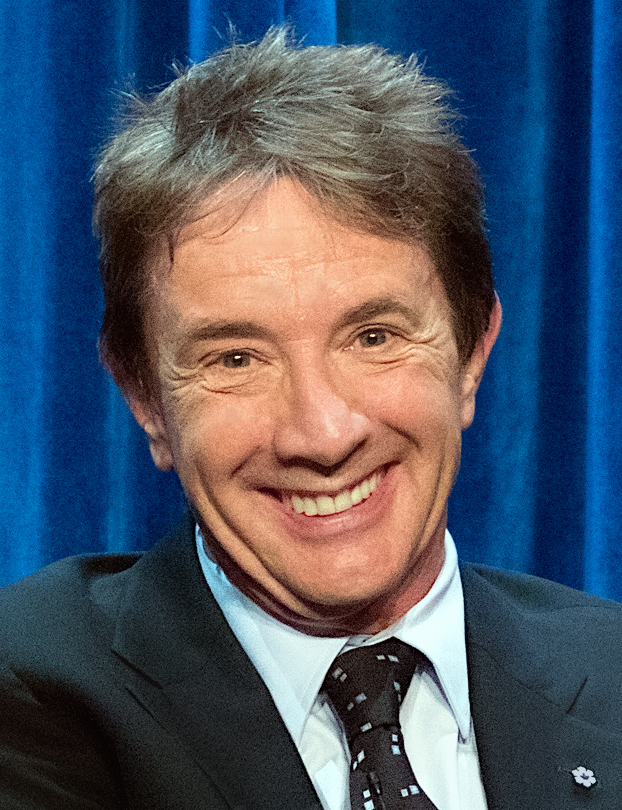
Martin Short won for Only Murders in the Building (2024).

=== 1990s ===
Year	Actress	Film	Role(s)	Ref.
1994 (1st)	Jason Alexander	Seinfeld	George Costanza	
1994 (1st)	John Goodman	Roseanne	Dan Conner	
1994 (1st)	Kelsey Grammer	Frasier	Frasier Crane	
1994 (1st)	David Hyde Pierce	Frasier	Niles Crane	
1994 (1st)	Paul Reiser	Mad About You	Paul Buchman	
1995 (2nd)	David Hyde Pierce	Frasier	Niles Crane	
1995 (2nd)	Jason Alexander	Seinfeld	George Costanza	
1995 (2nd)	Kelsey Grammer	Frasier	Frasier Crane	
1995 (2nd)	Paul Reiser	Mad About You	Paul Buchman	
1995 (2nd)	Michael Richards	Seinfeld	Cosmo Kramer	
1996 (3rd)	John Lithgow	3rd Rock from the Sun	Dick Solomon	
1996 (3rd)	Jason Alexander	Seinfeld	George Costanza	
1996 (3rd)	Kelsey Grammer	Frasier	Frasier Crane	
1996 (3rd)	David Hyde Pierce	Frasier	Niles Crane	
1996 (3rd)	Michael Richards	Seinfeld	Cosmo Kramer	
1997 (4th)	John Lithgow	3rd Rock from the Sun	Dick Solomon	
1997 (4th)	Jason Alexander	Seinfeld	George Costanza	
1997 (4th)	Kelsey Grammer	Frasier	Frasier Crane	
1997 (4th)	David Hyde Pierce	Frasier	Niles Crane	
1997 (4th)	Michael Richards	Seinfeld	Cosmo Kramer	
1998 (5th)	Michael J. Fox	Spin City	Mike Flaherty	
1998 (5th)	Jason Alexander	Seinfeld	George Costanza	
1998 (5th)	Kelsey Grammer	Frasier	Frasier Crane	
1998 (5th)	David Hyde Pierce	Frasier	Niles Crane	
1998 (5th)	Peter MacNicol	Ally McBeal	John Cage	
1999 (6th)	Michael J. Fox	Spin City	Mike Flaherty	
1999 (6th)	Kelsey Grammer	Frasier	Frasier Crane	
1999 (6th)	David Hyde Pierce	Frasier	Niles Crane	
1999 (6th)	Peter MacNicol	Ally McBeal	John Cage	
1999 (6th)	Ray Romano	Everybody Loves Raymond	Ray Barone	

=== 2000s ===
Year	Actress	Film	Role(s)	Ref.
2000 (7th)	Robert Downey Jr.	Ally McBeal	Larry Paul	
2000 (7th)	Kelsey Grammer	Frasier	Frasier Crane	
2000 (7th)	Sean Hayes	Will & Grace	Jack McFarland	
2000 (7th)	Peter MacNicol	Ally McBeal	John Cage	
2000 (7th)	David Hyde Pierce	Frasier	Niles Crane	
2001 (8th)	Sean Hayes	Will & Grace	Jack McFarland	
2001 (8th)	Peter Boyle	Everybody Loves Raymond	Frank Barone	
2001 (8th)	Kelsey Grammer	Frasier	Frasier Crane	
2001 (8th)	David Hyde Pierce	Frasier	Niles Crane	
2001 (8th)	Ray Romano	Everybody Loves Raymond	Ray Barone	
2002 (9th)	Sean Hayes	Will & Grace	Jack McFarland	
2002 (9th)	Matt LeBlanc	Friends	Joey Tribbiani	
2002 (9th)	Bernie Mac	The Bernie Mac Show	Bernie McCullough	
2002 (9th)	Ray Romano	Everybody Loves Raymond	Ray Barone	
2002 (9th)	Tony Shalhoub	Monk	Adrian Monk	
2003 (10th)	Tony Shalhoub	Monk	Adrian Monk	
2003 (10th)	Peter Boyle	Everybody Loves Raymond	Frank Barone	
2003 (10th)	Brad Garrett	Everybody Loves Raymond	Robert Barone	
2003 (10th)	Sean Hayes	Will & Grace	Jack McFarland	
2003 (10th)	Ray Romano	Everybody Loves Raymond	Ray Barone	
2004 (11th)	Tony Shalhoub	Monk	Adrian Monk	
2004 (11th)	Jason Bateman	Arrested Development	Michael Bluth	
2004 (11th)	Sean Hayes	Will & Grace	Jack McFarland	
2004 (11th)	Ray Romano	Everybody Loves Raymond	Ray Barone	
2004 (11th)	Charlie Sheen	Two and a Half Men	Charlie Harper	
2005 (12th)	Sean Hayes	Will & Grace	Jack McFarland	
2005 (12th)	Larry David	Curb Your Enthusiasm	Himself	
2005 (12th)	Jason Lee	My Name Is Earl	Earl Hickey	
2005 (12th)	William Shatner	Boston Legal	Denny Crane	
2005 (12th)	James Spader	Boston Legal	Alan Shore	
2006 (13th)	Alec Baldwin	30 Rock	Jack Donaghy	
2006 (13th)	Steve Carell	The Office	Michael Scott	
2006 (13th)	Jason Lee	My Name Is Earl	Earl Hickey	
2006 (13th)	Jeremy Piven	Entourage	Ari Gold	
2006 (13th)	Tony Shalhoub	Monk	Adrian Monk	
2007 (14th)	Alec Baldwin	30 Rock	Jack Donaghy	
2007 (14th)	Steve Carell	The Office	Michael Scott	
2007 (14th)	Ricky Gervais	Extras	Andy Millman	
2007 (14th)	Jeremy Piven	Entourage	Ari Gold	
2007 (14th)	Tony Shalhoub	Monk	Adrian Monk	
2008 (15th)	Alec Baldwin	30 Rock	Jack Donaghy	
2008 (15th)	Steve Carell	The Office	Michael Scott	
2008 (15th)	David Duchovny	Californication	Hank Moody	
2008 (15th)	Jeremy Piven	Entourage	Ari Gold	
2008 (15th)	Tony Shalhoub	Monk	Adrian Monk	
2009 (16th)	Alec Baldwin	30 Rock	Jack Donaghy	
2009 (16th)	Steve Carell	The Office	Michael Scott	
2009 (16th)	Larry David	Curb Your Enthusiasm	Himself	
2009 (16th)	Tony Shalhoub	Monk	Adrian Monk	
2009 (16th)	Charlie Sheen	Two and a Half Men	Charlie Harper	

=== 2010s ===
Year	Actress	Film	Role(s)	Ref.
2010 (17th)	Alec Baldwin	30 Rock	Jack Donaghy	
2010 (17th)	Steve Carell	The Office	Michael Scott	
2010 (17th)	Ty Burrell	Modern Family	Phil Dunphy	
2010 (17th)	Chris Colfer	Glee	Kurt Hummel	
2010 (17th)	Ed O'Neill	Modern Family	Jay Pritchett	
2011 (18th)	Alec Baldwin	30 Rock	Jack Donaghy	
2011 (18th)	Ty Burrell	Modern Family	Phil Dunphy	
2011 (18th)	Steve Carell	The Office	Michael Scott	
2011 (18th)	Jon Cryer	Two and a Half Men	Alan Harper	
2011 (18th)	Eric Stonestreet	Modern Family	Cameron Tucker	
2012 (19th)	Alec Baldwin	30 Rock	Jack Donaghy	
2012 (19th)	Ty Burrell	Modern Family	Phil Dunphy	
2012 (19th)	Louis C.K.	Louie	Louie	
2012 (19th)	Jim Parsons	The Big Bang Theory	Dr. Sheldon Cooper	
2012 (19th)	Eric Stonestreet	Modern Family	Cameron Tucker	
2013 (20th)	Ty Burrell	Modern Family	Phil Dunphy	
2013 (20th)	Alec Baldwin	30 Rock	Jack Donaghy	
2013 (20th)	Jason Bateman	Arrested Development	Michael Bluth	
2013 (20th)	Don Cheadle	House of Lies	Marty Kaan	
2013 (20th)	Jim Parsons	The Big Bang Theory	Dr. Sheldon Cooper	
2014 (21st)	William H. Macy	Shameless	Frank Gallagher	
2014 (21st)	Ty Burrell	Modern Family	Phil Dunphy	
2014 (21st)	Louis C.K.	Louie	Louie	
2014 (21st)	Jim Parsons	The Big Bang Theory	Dr. Sheldon Cooper	
2014 (21st)	Eric Stonestreet	Modern Family	Cameron Tucker	
2015 (22nd)	Jeffrey Tambor	Transparent	Maura Pfefferman	
2015 (22nd)	Ty Burrell	Modern Family	Phil Dunphy	
2015 (22nd)	Louis C.K.	Louie	Louie	
2015 (22nd)	William H. Macy	Shameless	Frank Gallagher	
2015 (22nd)	Jim Parsons	The Big Bang Theory	Dr. Sheldon Cooper	
2016 (23rd)	William H. Macy	Shameless	Frank Gallagher	
2016 (23rd)	Anthony Anderson	Black-ish	Andre "Dre" Johnson Sr.	
2016 (23rd)	Tituss Burgess	Unbreakable Kimmy Schmidt	Titus Andromedon	
2016 (23rd)	Ty Burrell	Modern Family	Phil Dunphy	
2016 (23rd)	Jeffrey Tambor	Transparent	Maura Pfefferman	
2017 (24th)	William H. Macy	Shameless	Frank Gallagher	
2017 (24th)	Anthony Anderson	Black-ish	Andre "Dre" Johnson Sr.	
2017 (24th)	Aziz Ansari	Master of None	Dev Shah	
2017 (24th)	Larry David	Curb Your Enthusiasm	Himself	
2017 (24th)	Sean Hayes	Will & Grace	Jack McFarland	
2017 (24th)	Marc Maron	GLOW	Sam Sylvia	
2018 (25th)	Tony Shalhoub	The Marvelous Mrs. Maisel	Abe Weissman	
2018 (25th)	Alan Arkin	The Kominsky Method	Norman Newlander	
2018 (25th)	Michael Douglas	The Kominsky Method	Sandy Kominsky	
2018 (25th)	Bill Hader	Barry	Barry Berkman / Barry Block	
2018 (25th)	Henry Winkler	Barry	Gene Cousineau	
2019 (26th)	Tony Shalhoub	The Marvelous Mrs. Maisel	Abe Weissman	
2019 (26th)	Alan Arkin	The Kominsky Method	Norman Newlander	
2019 (26th)	Michael Douglas	The Kominsky Method	Sandy Kominsky	
2019 (26th)	Bill Hader	Barry	Barry Berkman / Barry Block	
2019 (26th)	Andrew Scott	Fleabag	The Priest	

=== 2020s ===
Year	Actress	Film	Role(s)	Ref.
2020 (27th)	Jason Sudeikis	Ted Lasso	Ted Lasso	
2020 (27th)	Nicholas Hoult	The Great	Peter III of Russia	
2020 (27th)	Dan Levy	Schitt's Creek	David Rose	
2020 (27th)	Eugene Levy	Schitt's Creek	Johnny Rose	
2020 (27th)	Ramy Youssef	Ramy	Ramy Hassan	
2021 (28th)
2021 (28th)	Jason Sudeikis	Ted Lasso	Ted Lasso	
2021 (28th)	Michael Douglas	The Kominsky Method	Sandy Kominsky	
2021 (28th)	Brett Goldstein	Ted Lasso	Roy Kent	
2021 (28th)	Steve Martin	Only Murders in the Building	Charles Haden-Savage	
2021 (28th)	Martin Short	Only Murders in the Building	Oliver Putnam	
2022 (29th)	Jeremy Allen White	The Bear	Carmen "Carmy" Berzatto	
2022 (29th)	Anthony Carrigan	Barry	NoHo Hank	
2022 (29th)	Bill Hader	Barry	Barry Berkman / Barry Block	
2022 (29th)	Steve Martin	Only Murders in the Building	Charles Haden-Savage	
2022 (29th)	Martin Short	Only Murders in the Building	Oliver Putnam	
2023 (30th)	Jeremy Allen White	The Bear	Carmen "Carmy" Berzatto	
2023 (30th)	Brett Goldstein	Ted Lasso	Roy Kent	
2023 (30th)	Bill Hader	Barry	Barry Berkman	
2023 (30th)	Ebon Moss-Bachrach	The Bear	Richard "Richie" Jerimovich	
2023 (30th)	Jason Sudeikis	Ted Lasso	Ted Lasso	
2024 (31st)	Martin Short	Only Murders in the Building	Oliver Putnam	
2024 (31st)	Adam Brody	Nobody Wants This	Noah Roklov	
2024 (31st)	Ted Danson	A Man on the Inside	Charles Nieuwendyk	
2024 (31st)	Harrison Ford	Shrinking	Dr. Paul Rhoades	
2024 (31st)	Jeremy Allen White	The Bear	Carmen "Carmy" Berzatto	
2025 (32nd)	Seth Rogen	The Studio	Matt Remick	
2025 (32nd)	Ike Barinholtz	The Studio	Sal Saperstein	
2025 (32nd)	Adam Brody	Nobody Wants This	Noah Roklov	
2025 (32nd)	Ted Danson	A Man on the Inside	Charles Nieuwendyk	
2025 (32nd)	Martin Short	Only Murders in the Building	Oliver Putnam	

== Superlatives ==
Superlative	Male Actor - Drama Series		Male Actor - Comedy Series		Overall	
Actor with most awards	Jason Bateman, James Gandolfini	3	Alec Baldwin	7	Alec Baldwin	7
Actor with most nominations	Dennis Franz	8	Tony Shalhoub	9	Tony Shalhoub	9
Actor with most nominations without ever winning	Jon Hamm	6	Kelsey Grammer	8	Kelsey Grammer	8
Television program with most wins	The Sopranos	3	30 Rock	7	30 Rock	7
Television program with most nominations	NYPD Blue	13	Frasier	16	Frasier	16

== Actors with multiple awards ==
7 wins

- Alec Baldwin (consecutive)

4 wins

- Tony Shalhoub (twice consecutive)

3 wins

- Sean Hayes (2 consecutive)
- William H. Macy (2 consecutive)

2 wins

- Michael J. Fox (consecutive)
- John Lithgow (consecutive)
- Jason Sudeikis (consecutive)
- Jeremy Allen White (consecutive)

== Series with multiple awards ==
7 wins

- 30 Rock (NBC)

3 wins

- Shameless (Showtime)
- Will & Grace (NBC)

2 wins

- 3rd Rock from the Sun (NBC)
- The Bear (FX)
- The Marvelous Mrs. Maisel (Amazon)
- Monk (USA
- Spin City (ABC)
- Ted Lasso (AppleTV+)

== Actors with multiple nominations ==
9 nominations

- Tony Shalhoub

8 nominations

- Alec Baldwin
- Kelsey Grammer
- David Hyde Pierce

7 nominations

- Ty Burrell
- Sean Hayes

6 nominations

- Steve Carell

5 nominations

- Jason Alexander
- Ray Romano

4 nominations

- Bill Hader
- William H. Macy
- Jim Parsons
- Martin Short

3 nominations

- Louis C.K.
- Larry David
- Michael Douglas
- Peter MacNicol
- Jeremy Piven
- Michael Richards
- Eric Stonestreet
- Jason Sudeikis
- Jeremy Allen White

2 nominations

- Anthony Anderson
- Alan Arkin
- Jason Bateman
- Peter Boyle
- Adam Brody
- Ted Danson
- Michael J. Fox
- Brett Goldstein
- Jason Lee
- John Lithgow
- Steve Martin
- Paul Reiser
- Charlie Sheen
- Jeffrey Tambor

== Series with multiple nominations ==
16 nominations

- Frasier (NBC)

11 nominations

- Modern Family (ABC)

8 nominations

- 30 Rock (NBC)
- Everybody Loves Raymond (CBS)
- Seinfeld (NBC)

7 nominations

- Monk (USA)
- Will & Grace (NBC)

6 nominations

- Barry (HBO)
- The Office (NBC)
- Only Murders in the Building (Hulu)

5 nominations

- The Kominsky Method (Netflix)
- Ted Lasso (Apple TV)

4 nominations

- Ally McBeal (Fox)
- The Bear (FX)
- The Big Bang Theory (CBS)
- Shameless (Showtime)

3 nominations

- Curb Your Enthusiasm (HBO)
- Entourage (HBO)
- Louie (FX)
- Two and a Half Men (CBS)

2 nominations

- 3rd Rock from the Sun (NBC)
- Arrested Development (Fox/Netflix)
- Black-ish (ABC)
- Boston Legal (ABC)
- Mad About You (NBC)
- A Man on the Inside (Netflix)
- The Marvelous Mrs. Maisel (Amazon)
- My Name Is Earl (NBC)
- Nobody Wants This (Netflix)
- Schitt's Creek (PopTV)
- Spin City (ABC)
- The Studio (Apple TV)
- Transparent (Amazon)

== See also ==
- Primetime Emmy Award for Outstanding Lead Actor in a Comedy Series
- Primetime Emmy Award for Outstanding Supporting Actor in a Comedy Series
- Golden Globe Award for Best Actor – Television Series Musical or Comedy
