= Jerry Kupfer =

American television producer

- Occupation: Producer
- Years active: 1994-present

Jerry Kupfer is an American television producer who has worked on shows such as 30 Rock and Strangers with Candy.

In addition he has won multiple Emmy awards.

He was also nominated at the 71st Academy Awards in the category of Best Documentary Feature for his work on the film Dancemaker. He shared his nomination with Matthew Diamond.
