= Dylan Morgan =

Welsh mathematician (1946–2011)

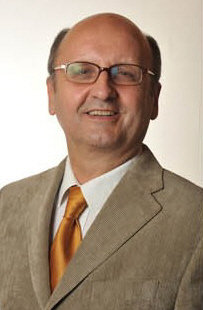
(John) Dylan Morgan

John Dylan Morgan (3 May 1946 – 5 March 2011) was a Welsh mathematician, physicist, hypnotherapist and author. He developed a theoretical approach to hypnotherapy which he published in his book Principles of Hypnotherapy. He also made contributions in theoretical and applied physics.

== Early life and education ==
Dylan Morgan was born in 1946 in Burnley, Lancashire to Morien and Elaine Morgan.

He was educated at a Welsh-speaking primary school Ysgol Gynradd Gymraeg in Cwmdare, and Aberdare Boys' Grammar School, in South Wales.

At school he was interested in chess and acting. He once played the lead in Molière's Tartuffe.

He had a scholarship to study at Jesus College Oxford and graduated with a first-class honours degree in Mathematics. He then obtained a doctorate in Elementary Particle Theory from the University of Oxford.

== Mathematical Physics ==
Dylan Morgan joined the Mathematics Department of Dundee University in 1970 as a researcher. He worked on noise generated by high-speed jet engines, as well as the noise generated by high-speed helicopter rotors.

He also served as a Senior Scientific Officer at the Royal Aircraft Establishment.

His interest in theoretical physics continued, despite his change of career direction to hypnotherapy, and he published a number of papers in this area.

== Hypnotherapy ==
Motivated by a desire to help people in 1983 Dr Morgan decided on a change of career and decided to become a hypnotherapist. He was self-taught and this allowed him to work out his own original theory for guiding his practice. This theory is presented in his book The Principles of Hypnotherapy which aims to provide a complete theory of hypnosis and hypnotherapy.

For a few years he also helped at the Leeds University Psychology Department to run courses on hypnosis for qualified doctors, dentists etc.

He was the editor of the Journal of the National Council of Psychotherapists and Hypnotherapy Register from 1983 to 1987.

== Personal life ==
Dylan Morgan married Trudi Yates, a fellow student at Oxford, in 1969. They had a daughter in 1981.

In February 2011 he was diagnosed with pancreatic cancer and despite an operation to remove the tumour died on 5 March. His funeral was held at Lawnswood Crematorium in Leeds on 22 March 2011.

Since his school days he had a keen interest in chess and later on he noted playing chess and making chess boards as his hobbies. He also maintained a number of web sites for chess clubs in the Leeds area.

== Bibliography ==
- DS Jones; JD Morgan (1974). "A Linear Model of a Finite Amplitude Helmholtz Instability". Proceedings of the Royal Society A: Mathematical, Physical and Engineering Sciences. 338 (1612). Royal Society of London: 17–41. Bibcode:1974RSPSA.338...17J. doi:10.1098/rspa.1974.0071. S2CID 122076245.
- JD Morgan (29 July 1975). "The interaction of sound with a subsonic cylindrical vortex layer". Proceedings of the Royal Society A: Mathematical, Physical and Engineering Sciences. 344 (1638). Royal Society of London: 341–362. Bibcode:1975RSPSA.344..341M. doi:10.1098/rspa.1975.0105. S2CID 119855981.
- J. D. Morgan (November 1974). "The interaction of sound with a semiinfinite vortex sheet". Quarterly Journal of Mechanics and Applied Mathematics. 27 (4): 465–487. doi:10.1093/qjmam/27.4.465.
- JD Morgan (22 December 1982). "Non-linear effect in high speed rotor noise". Journal of Sound and Vibration. 85 (4): 501–511. Bibcode:1982JSV....85..501M. doi:10.1016/0022-460X(82)90319-4.
- Dylan Morgan (1996). Principles of Hypnotherapy. Eildon Press. ISBN 978-0-9525620-1-6.
- Dylan Morgan (2008). Hypnosis for Beginners. Eildon Press. ISBN 978-0-9525620-4-7.
