= Irene Burns =

American television producer

- Occupation: Television producer
- Years active: 1997-present

Irene Burns is an American television producer who has worked on shows such as 30 Rock and Oz.

She has been nominated for two Emmy Awards.
