= Marci Klein =

American television producer (born 1967)

- Klein in 2026
- Born: October 21, 1967 (age 59)
- Education: Brown University
- Occupation: Television producer
- Spouse: Scott Murphy (m. 2000)
- Children: 2
- Father: Calvin Klein
- Awards: Emmy Award

Marci Klein (born October 21, 1967) is an American television producer best known for her work on Saturday Night Live and 30 Rock. She has won four Emmy Awards. She is the daughter of fashion designer Calvin Klein.

== Early life and education ==
Klein is the daughter of fashion designer Calvin Klein and his first wife, textile designer Jayne Centre. She admitted being embarrassed by often seeing her father's name on her boyfriend's underwear.

In February 1978, at the age of 11, Klein was kidnapped by her babysitter. After her father paid the ransom, the police were able to track back the kidnappers. The babysitter claimed that her father Calvin Klein had set up this abduction to get nationwide publicity, but she later retracted this claim.

Klein grew up in New York City, where she attended the Dalton School. She attended Emerson College before graduating from Brown University in 1988.

== Career ==
In 1989, Klein began a twenty-four year career at Saturday Night Live. As a producer and head of the show's talent department, Klein discovered a number of future comedy superstars, including Molly Shannon, Tracy Morgan, Jimmy Fallon, Seth Meyers, Will Ferrell, Fred Armisen, Chris Kattan, Darrell Hammond, Sarah Silverman, Jason Sudeikis, Bill Hader, Maya Rudolph, and Ana Gasteyer. She was frequently talked about as a successor to SNL creator and Executive Producer Lorne Michaels, although she left the series in 2013.

Klein has been nominated for 14 Emmys, winning four times, once for Saturday Night Live's 25th Anniversary Special and three times for 30 Rock. She has also been nominated for nine Producers Guild Awards, winning three.

During Alec Baldwin's 2007 Golden Globes acceptance speech, he personally thanked Klein and referred to her as "the greatest producer in the history of broadcast television," to which she received an ovation from the audience.

== Personal life ==
Klein married Scott Murphy on October 30, 2000, at the Wainscott Chapel in Wainscott, New York. They have two children together.
