= Anime Pasadena =

Anime convention in Los Angeles, California

- Status: Active
- Genre: Anime, manga, Japanese popular culture
- Venue: Pasadena Convention Center
- Location: Pasadena, California
- Coordinates: 34°8′37″N 118°8′42″W
- Country: United States
- Inaugurated: 2018
- Organizer: Nerdbot Media
- Website: animepasadena.com

Anime Pasadena is an annual two-day anime convention held during November at the Pasadena Convention Center in Pasadena, California.

== Programming ==
The convention typically offers an arcade, artist alley, cosplay contest, fashion show, gaming tournaments, karaoke, kids cosplay competition, live music, Maid Cafe, and vendors.

== History ==
Anime Pasadena's 2020 event in April was postponed to November, and later cancelled due to the COVID-19 pandemic. Anime Pasadena's 2021 event was the first time the convention was two days. The events's 2021 COVID-19 policies required masks and vaccination or tests. Anime Pasadena used the whole convention center for the first time in 2023. The convention on Friday in 2026 had free attendance, with some guests only being scheduled for that day, and the artist alley and vendor hall being closed.

=== Event history ===
Dates	Location	Atten.	Guests
May 26, 2018	Pasadena Civic Center; Pasadena, California		Bennett Abara, Gregg Berger, Christine Marie Cabanos, Ray Chase, Robbie Daymond, Neil Kaplan, Danielle McRae, and Jason Paige.
April 20, 2019	Pasadena Convention Center; Pasadena, California		Tony Anselmo, Gregg Berger, Christine Marie Cabanos, Ray Chase, Robbie Daymond, Quinton Flynn, Kellen Goff, Kyle Hebert, Max Mittelman, Paul Nakauchi, Jason Paige, Carla Perez, Rikki Simons, and Veronica Taylor.
December 11-12, 2021	Pasadena Convention Center; Pasadena, California		Ray Chase, Leah Clark, Khoi Dao, Robbie Daymond, Maile Flanagan, Tom Gibis, Kellen Goff, Kyle Hebert, Kate Higgins, Neil Kaplan, Brianna Knickerbocker, Aleks Le, E. Jason Liebrecht, Rachael Lillis, Elizabeth Maxwell, Adam McArthur, Kayli Mills, Max Mittelman, George Newbern, Colleen O'Shaughnessey, Alejandra Reynoso, Zeno Robinson, Christopher Sabat, Tara Sands, Sean Schemmel, Veronica Taylor, Anne Yatco, and Keone Young.
November 19-20, 2022	Pasadena Convention Center; Pasadena, California		Zach Aguilar, Greg Baldwin, Brian Beacock, Justin Briner, Brook Chalmers, Shannon Chan-Kent, Brittany Cox, Jim Cummings, Hayden Daviau, Grey DeLisle Griffin, Brian Donovan, Brian Drummond, Doug Erholtz, Bill Farmer, Maile Flanagan, Sandy Fox, Tom Gibis, Michael Haigney, Kyle Hebert, Kate Higgins, Bret Iwan, Nadji Jeter, Alessandro Juliani, Neil Kaplan, Brianna Knickerbocker, Lex Lang, Aleks Le, E. Jason Liebrecht, Yuri Lowenthal, Faye Mata, David Matranga, Elizabeth Maxwell, Michaela Jill Murphy, Trina Nishimura, Bryce Papenbrook, Tara Platt, Monica Rial, Zeno Robinson, Alejandro Saab, Christopher Sabat, Sean Schemmel, Brad Swaile, Kaiji Tang, Abby Trott, Brandon Winckler, Wally Wingert, Dave Wittenberg, Dan Woren, and Michael Yurchak.
November 4-5, 2023	Pasadena Convention Center; Pasadena, California		Felecia Angelle, Troy Baker, Justin Briner, Steve Burton, Clifford Chapin, Ray Chase, Luci Christian, Dameon Clarke, Colleen Clinkenbeard, Robbie Daymond, Steve Downes, Kellen Goff, Kyle Hebert, Sean Hennigan, Richard Horvitz, Lauren Landa, Lex Lang, Aleks Le, Ryan Colt Levy, Erica Lindbeck, Adam McArthur, Kristen McGuire, Brandon McInnis, Jillian Michael, Max Mittelman, Xander Mobus, George Newbern, Vivian Nixon-Williams, Bryce Pinkham, Brandon Potter, Brandon Rogers, Christopher Sabat, Tara Sands, Keith Silverstein, Ian Sinclair, Paul St. Peter, Sonny Strait, Kaiji Tang, J. Michael Tatum, Jen Taylor, Cristina Vee, David Vincent, Mark Whitten, Anne Yatco, and Stephanie Young.
November 2-3, 2024	Pasadena Convention Center; Pasadena, California		Zach Aguilar, Krystina Alabado, Katelyn Barr, Don Bluth, Justin Briner, Clifford Chapin, Ray Chase, Greg Chun, Leah Clark, Dameon Clarke, Justin Cook, Robbie Daymond, Sandy Fox, Kimiko Glenn, Kyle Hebert, Erika Henningsen, Kate Higgins, Lauren Landa, Lex Lang, Aleks Le, Cherami Leigh, Adam McArthur, Landon McDonald, Kristen McGuire, Scott Menville, Daman Mills, Max Mittelman, Chie Nakamura, Trina Nishimura, Tony Oliver, Joel Perez, Monica Rial, Zeno Robinson, Blake Roman, Nicolas Roye, Michelle Ruff, Christopher Sabat, Sean Schemmel, Patrick Seitz, Stephanie Sheh, Matt Shipman, Michael Sinterniklaas, Ellyn Stern, Amir Talai, Kaiji Tang, Nazeeh Tarsha, Eric Vale, Hynden Walch, Christopher Wehkamp, Debi Mae West, Dave Wittenberg, and Anne Yatco.
November 8-9, 2025	Pasadena Convention Center; Pasadena, California	16,000 (est.)	Zach Aguilar, Britt Baron, Bryson Baugus, A.J. Beckles, Dawn M. Bennett, John Bentley, Johnny Yong Bosch, Griffin Burns, Tiana Camacho, Clifford Chapin, Greg Chun, Allegra Clark, Dameon Clarke, Colleen Clinkenbeard, Ben Diskin, Doug Erholtz, Jason Faunt, Sandy Fox, Jessie James Grelle, David Hayter, Kyle Hebert, Kate Higgins, Ali Hillis, May Hong, Richard Horvitz, Lauren Landa, Lex Lang, Aleks Le, Amanda "AmaLee" Lee, Cherami Leigh, Yuri Lowenthal, David Matranga, Adam McArthur, Vivienne Medrano, Xander Mobus, Cassandra Lee Morris, Sarah Natochenny, George Newbern, Trina Nishimura, Bryce Papenbrook, Tara Platt, Griffin Puatu, Dallas Reid, Alejandra Reynoso, Zeno Robinson, Brandon Rogers, Michelle Ruff, Alejandro Saab, Christopher Sabat, Sean Schemmel, Jonah Scott, Patrick Seitz, Joshua Seth, John Swasey, Kaiji Tang, Abby Trott, Cristina Vee, Kari Wahlgren, Briana White, Dave Wittenberg, Anne Yatco, Suzie Yeung, and Stephanie Young.
November 6-8, 2026	Pasadena Convention Center; Pasadena, California		Samantha Béart, Dante Basco, Christian Borle, Johnny Yong Bosch, Justin Briner, Shannon Chan-Kent, Clifford Chapin, Ray Chase, Jim Cummings, Robbie Daymond, Aaron Dismuke, Brian Donovan, Steve Downes, Brian Drummond, Doug Erholtz, Bill Farmer, Quinton Flynn, David Lee Gallagher, Todd Haberkorn, David Hayter, Bret Iwan, Alessandro Juliani, Peter Kelamis, Brianna Knickerbocker, Lauren Landa, Lex Lang, Ryan Colt Levy, Emi Lo, Yuri Lowenthal, Mackenyu, Jason Marnocha, David Matranga, Kristen McGuire, Brandon McInnis, Reagan Murdock, Bryce Papenbrook, Tara Platt, Monica Rial, Michelle Ruff, Derick Snow, Jeff Steitzer, Brad Swaile, Kaiji Tang, J. Michael Tatum, Jen Taylor, Eric Vale, Cristina Vee, Steven John Ward, Sarah Wiedenheft, Dave Wittenberg, and Michael Yurchak.
