= Tiger House =

2015 action thriller film by Thomas Daley

- Promotional poster
- Directed by: Thomas Daley
- Written by: Simon Lewis
- Produced by: Richard Mansell; Tarquin Glass; Ronnie Apteker
- Starring: Kaya Scodelario; Dougray Scott; Ed Skrein
- Edited by: Gary Forrester
- Music by: Roger Goula
- Production companies: Glass Man Films; Tiger House Film
- Distributed by: Koch Media (United Kingdom)
- Release date: 24 August 2015 (video on demand)
- Running time: 82 minutes
- Countries: United Kingdom; South Africa
- Language: English

Tiger House is a 2015 action thriller film directed by Thomas Daley and starring Kaya Scodelario, Dougray Scott, and Ed Skrein. Scodelario stars as an injured and pregnant gymnast who must defend her boyfriend's house against a home invasion. The film is produced by the United Kingdom-based Glass Man Films and the South Africa–based Tiger House Film. The film, set in the United Kingdom, was filmed in South Africa. Koch Media acquired distribution rights for the United Kingdom. Tiger House was released for digital download on 24 August 2015 and on home media on 1 September 2015.

== Plot ==
Mark, who comes from a well-off family, meets his gymnast girlfriend Kelly after school. She becomes uncomfortable when he shows her a crossbow. While demonstrating it, he accidentally shoots her in the leg. An unspecified time later, Kelly sneaks into Mark's house through his second-story window and confronts him on why he has not contacted her lately. Mark reveals that his parents have grounded him and taken away his mobile phone after finding a condom and drugs among his possessions. Lynn, Mark's mother, interrupts them. As Kelly hides, she overhears Lynn insult her, calling her low class and unworthy of Mark.

After Lynn leaves, Kelly tells Mark she is pregnant. Upset, Mark complains his life plans could be ruined. Before they can discuss it further, Mark hears a loud thump. Unknown to Mark, home invaders have killed his dog and taken his parents hostage. He leaves his room to investigate, and Kelly hears further noises. Panicking, she hides under Mark's bed. The bedroom door bursts open, and robbers Shane, Callum, Sveta, and Reg enter. Shane has a glass shard embedded in his side, and they set him down on the bed. He instructs the others to stick to their plan: Reg and Sveta are to take Mark's father, Doug, to his bank and rob it while Callum and Shane watch the hostages.

As Callum researches how to make a tourniquet on Mark's computer, Kelly desperately reaches for a cell phone, only to find its battery is dead. Callum becomes excited when he learns Lynn is a doctor, and he temporarily frees her so she can look at Shane. Suspicious Mark may have invited her over, Lynn intentionally drops an item so she can glance under the bed. After stabilizing Shane, she is taken back to her bedroom and tied up with Mark. As Callum is distracted and Shane rests, Kelly escapes the bedroom. She is about to leave the house when Ferdinand, a man with whom Lynn is having an affair, arrives. When Ferdinand sees Callum's unmasked face, Callum kills him.

As Callum menaces Mark and Lynn, Kelly sneaks up on him and stabs him with a pair of scissors. Callum chases her back to the bedroom, and she flees to the attic, stacking heavy objects on the trapdoor. In the attic, Kelly finds Mark's crossbow, though it is not loaded. As Callum enters the attic, she slips by him and traps him there. Shane stops her with a pistol. He confesses to her that he knows he is dying and has become scared. After they have a tense conversation, in which he learns about Ferdinand's murder, Shane allows Kelly to go. She frees Mark and Lynn, and they race downstairs. Mark and Lynn are immediately recaptured by Reg and Sveta, who have returned from the successful heist.

Reg and Sveta free Callum. After grabbing a bolt, Kelly returns to the attic and retrieves the crossbow. When Reg refuses to kill the hostages, Callum takes his shotgun and says he will do it himself. As Callum leaves to look for her, Kelly shoots Reg with the crossbow, killing him, though he starts a fire before he dies. As the house burns, Kelly jumps out a window and surprises Sveta, killing him with the same bolt used to kill Reg. Kelly puts on Sveta's mask, tricking Callum into believing he needs assistance. Before she can kill him, Doug knocks her unconscious. As Callum prepares to kill Kelly, Shane recovers long enough to shoot and kill him.

Doug says he only wanted to escape his unhappy marriage and retire wealthy. Blaming him for the entire ordeal, Lynn shoots and kills him with Reg's shotgun. With all the robbers dead, Mark, Kelly, and Lynn leave the burning house. As Mark helps Kelly load up her car with the stolen money, he offers to leave with her. Kelly stops him, telling him that he has his whole life ahead of him. Mark and Lynn practice their story, in which they say Kelly was never there and infighting caused the deaths of the robbers, and Kelly drives off.

== Cast ==
- Kaya Scodelario as Kelly
- Dougray Scott as Shane
- Ed Skrein as Callum
- Langley Kirkwood as Sveta
- Brandon Auret as Reg
- Daniel Boyd as Mark, Kelly's boyfriend
- Julie Summers as Lynn, Mark's mother
- Andrew Brent as Doug
- Nicholas Dallas as Ferdinand
- Luc Ramsden as CCTV Robber
- Nicholas Fortuin as CCTV Robber

== Production ==
Tiger House is directed by theatre director Thomas Daley. The film is produced by the United Kingdom-based Glass Man Films and the South Africa-based Tiger House Film with financing from South Africa's Industrial Development Corporation and the UK's Creativity Capital. Tiger House began filming in February 2014. Tiger House, which is set in Surrey, England, was filmed in Cape Town, South Africa. Filming also took place in Wynberg, a suburb of Cape Town. With a cast of nine actors, filming lasted for five weeks. Post-production of the film has been completed in the UK. The film was completed by late 2014.

== Release ==
Altitude Film Sales began to sell distribution rights in May 2013. In the following December, ZDF Enterprises acquired distribution rights for German-speaking territories in Europe, and Gulf Film acquired rights for the Middle East. In November 2014, Koch Media acquired rights to release Tiger House in the United Kingdom. Tiger House was released for digital download on 24 August 2015 and on home media on 1 September 2015.

== See also ==
- List of films featuring home invasions
