= Reine Swart =

South African director, writer and actress

- Born: 17 May 1990 (age 35)
- Education: University of Pretoria
- Occupations: Director, actress, producer, writer
- Years active: 2009-present
- Notable work: Skorokoro
- Spouse: Xander Swart
- Children: 2

Reine Swart (née Malan; born 17 May 1990) is a South African director, writer and actress. She starred in the Afrikaans surf film Die Pro (2015). She appeared alongside Tye Sheridan, Bel Powley and Emory Cohen in the film Detour (2016). On television, she appeared in the SyFy series Dominion, the kykNET series, Villa Rosa, and the CBBC series Jamillah and Aladdin.

Swart played the lead in Darrell Roodt's Siembamba (2017). Reine worked alongside James Badge Dale in 20th Century Fox's The Empty Man (2018).

In 2018, Swart made her feature film directorial debut on the horror film Heks, which was released in South Africa under the title Her Mask and in the United States as The Hex in 2020. That same year, Swart was part of an ensemble cast in the horror-comedy Triggered, which was released in the United States in November 2020 and in South Africa in January 2021. She also co-wrote the upcoming horror movie Flesh, starring Danielle Harris, with the film's director, Chris McGowan.

In 2025, The Forest, aka BOS, a post-apocalyptic romance-adventure she wrote and produced, was picked up for international release by Janson Media. The film was directed by Hendrik Cronje and Mari Molefe van Heerden.

== Early life ==
Swart attended the Afrikaanse Hoër Meisieskool. She graduated with a degree in industrial engineering from the University of Pretoria in 2012.

== Filmography ==
=== Film ===
Year	Title	Role	Notes
2014	Somer Son	Cerike	
2015	Die Pro	Yvette	
2016	Detour	Claire	
2016	Skorokoro	Heidi	
2017	Kampterrein	Miemie	
2017	Van der Merwe	Marike	
2017	Nul is Nie Niks Nie	Cindy	
2017	Siembamba	Chloe	
2019	The Refuge	Staci	
2020	The Empty Man	Pontifex Receptionist	
2020	Heks	Writer/Director	
2020	Triggered	Rian	
2022	Flesh	Co-Writer	
2025	The Forest	Writer/Producer/Editor	

=== Television ===
Year	Title	Role	Notes
2012	Villa Rosa	Nadine	> 100 episodes
2013	Geraamtes in die Kas	Trudie	
2014	Aalwyntyd	Petra	
2015	Dominion	Charlie	1 episode
2016	Jamillah and Aladdin	Shape Shifter	3 episodes
2017	Origins	Miss Redding	1 episode
2017	Z Nation	Carly McFadden	

== Awards and nominations ==
Year	Award	Category	Result	Ref.
2018	Africa Movie Academy Awards	Best Actress in a Leading Role (Siembamba)	Nominated	
