= Don Geiss, America and Hope =

- 30 Rock episode
- Episode no.: Season 4 Episode 15
- Directed by: Stephen Lee Davis
- Written by: Jack Burditt; Tracey Wigfield
- Production code: 415
- Original air date: March 18, 2010

Guest appearances
- John Anderson as Astronaut Mike Dexter; Scott Bryce as Dave Hess; Marceline Hugot as Kathy Geiss; James Rebhorn as Dr. Kaplan; Michael Sheen as Wesley Snipes; Jeff Steitzer as Priest

Episode chronology
← Previous "Future Husband"	Next → "Floyd"
- 30 Rock season 4

"Don Geiss, America, and Hope" is the fifteenth episode of the fourth season of the American television comedy series 30 Rock, and the 73rd overall episode of the series. It was directed by Stephen Lee Davis, and written by Jack Burditt and Tracey Wigfield. The episode originally aired on NBC in the United States on March 18, 2010. Guest stars in "Don Geiss, America and Hope" include John Anderson, Scott Bryce, Marceline Hugot, James Rebhorn, and Michael Sheen.

In the episode, Liz Lemon (Tina Fey) attempts to avoid running into Wesley Snipes (Sheen) after they fail to hit it off in their first encounter, but fate seems to want them together. At the same time, Jack Donaghy (Alec Baldwin) deals with the impending purchase of NBC. Finally, Tracy Jordan (Tracy Morgan) does damage control after his former nanny publishes a tell-all book.

The episode continued a story arc involving Wesley as a love interest for Liz, which began in the previous episode. "Don Geiss, America and Hope" makes reference to the real-life acquisition of NBC Universal by cable company Comcast, as well as that of professional golfer Tiger Woods' extramarital affairs scandal.

This episode of 30 Rock has received generally positive reviews from television critics. According to the Nielsen Media Research, it was watched by 6.857 million households during its original broadcast, and received a 3.0 rating/9 share among viewers in the 18–49 demographic. For his performance in "Don Geiss, America and Hope", Alec Baldwin received a Primetime Emmy Award nomination in the category for Outstanding Lead Actor in a Comedy Series.

== Plot ==
Jack Donaghy (Alec Baldwin), outgoing Vice President of East Coast Television and Microwave Oven Programming for General Electric (GE), researches company Kabletown (which recently purchased the NBC network as a charitable, tax-deductible act), to find a way he can contribute in the corporation's development. NBC page Kenneth Parcell (Jack McBrayer) lets it slip that he may have been living forever, when he shows concern that Kabletown may impose new rules for "age limits and age verification" for pages. A former colleague, Dave Hess (Scott Bryce), who left NBC for Kabletown, reveals that Kabletown's success comes from running pay-per-view adult channels; the company runs "the perfect business" and needs no investment in new services or products. On learning this, Jack is horrified at the prospect of no longer making things. Later, however, while giving a eulogy at former GE CEO Don Geiss's (Rip Torn) funeral, he has an epiphany and proposes to Kabletown executives that they produce "porn for women" (specifically, channels featuring attractive men who "listen" while women blather on).

Liz Lemon (Tina Fey) tries to avoid meeting with Wesley (Michael Sheen), the British man she met and flirted with while under the influence of anesthesia. Liz finds him to be annoying, but they continually run into each other, which leads them to believe they are meant to be together. However, after visiting the dentist office where they met, Liz and Wesley come to terms with the fact that the anesthesia was the cause of whatever they experienced, and agree to stop seeing each other. But when they run into each other yet again, Wesley suggests that they should probably just "settle" for one another. Liz is horrified at this prospect and consults Jack for advice, but he is still disconsolate at the prospect of "settling" for a company without upward momentum, and cannot help her. Later, Liz meets Wesley to tell him her answer is no, and she believes both of them can do better than being with each other; she is further dismayed to learn he shares his name with actor Wesley Snipes.

Meanwhile, Tracy Jordan's (Tracy Morgan) nanny publishes a tell-all book, revealing that he has never actually had an affair with anyone, a secret he had shared only with Jack in "The Ones". In order to restore his womanizing persona, Tracy holds a press conference announcing he is leaving show business to spend more time with a stripper, but no one is convinced. To make matters worse, women begin to come forward and admit that they did not have sex with Tracy. His wife Angie even advises him to have an affair in order to save his career, a suggestion which Jenna Maroney (Jane Krakowski) urges him to take seriously. Tracy attempts to proposition Liz, but is unable to pretend he wants to cheat on his wife. Liz rebuffs Tracy's advances, admitting she envies his happy marriage and urging him to embrace his monogamy.

At the end of the episode, Liz is seen watching and being intrigued by some of the "porn for women" content, which somehow features her fantasy boyfriend Astronaut Mike Dexter.

== Production ==
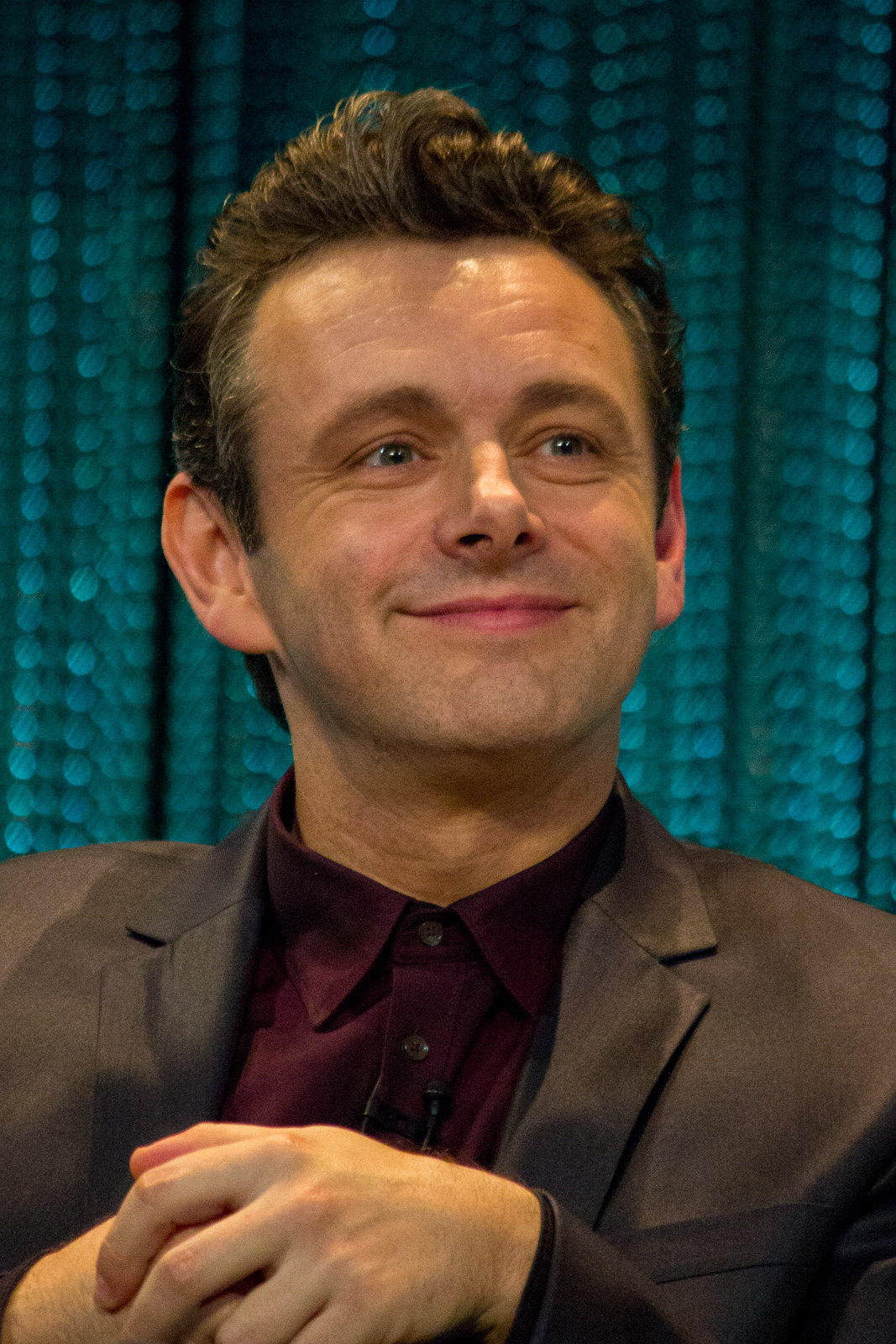
Michael Sheen made his second guest appearance on the show in this episode.

"Don Geiss, America and Hope" was directed by series first assistant director Stephen Lee Davis, and written by Jack Burditt and Tracey Wigfield. This was Burditt's first written episode for the season, as he had moved to Los Angeles, California, to become a staff writer on the CBS comedy show The New Adventures of Old Christine. Overall, this was Burditt's twelfth writing credit. This was Wigfield's third writing credit, and was Davis's first directed episode. "Don Geiss, America and Hope" originally aired in the United States on March 18, 2010, on NBC as the fifteenth episode of the show's fourth season and the 73rd overall episode of the series. This episode of 30 Rock was filmed on January 25 and January 27, 2010.

In January 2010, it was announced that Welsh actor Michael Sheen would guest star as a love interest for series creator Tina Fey's character, Liz Lemon. He made his debut as Wesley in the previous episode, "Future Husband". Actor Scott Bryce guest starred as Dave Hess, a former colleague of Jack Donaghy's. Bryce first appeared in the season three episode "Flu Shot" as a different character named Michael Templeton. Actress Marceline Hugot made her ninth appearance as Kathy Geiss, the daughter of GE CEO Don Geiss. In the episode, Kathy performs Ellens dritter Gesang by Schubert with a trumpet at her father's funeral. Dr. Kaplan was played by actor James Rebhorn, who first guest starred as the character in "Future Husband". At the end of "Don Geiss, America and Hope", where Liz is shown watching one of the "porn for women" channels, the man depicted as speaking to her was portrayed by actor John Anderson, who has guest starred previously on the show as Astronaut Mike Dexter. At the end of the credits, Anderson is credited as Astronaut Mike Dexter. Jack learns from former GE CEO Jack Welch, in the last episode, that current GE CEO Don Geiss (Rip Torn) has died. In "Don Geiss, America and Hope", a funeral service is held for Geiss. Television critic Bob Sassone of TV Squad, in his recap of this episode, wondered if Torn was written out of the series due to an alcohol-related incident that occurred with Torn in January 2010.

This episode was inspired by the real-life acquisition of NBC Universal by cable company Comcast in November 2009. After winning her fourth Screen Actors Guild Award as her 30 Rock character at the 16th Screen Actors Guild Awards ceremony in January 2010, Fey was asked whether or not the show would make reference to the Comcast acquisition to which she said that it would be dealt with. "The sale of NBC to another company is integral to our show and it will be hard for Jack." In the episode, Kabletown—a fictional Philadelphia company network—has taken over GE Sheinhardt NBC Universal, and Jack tries to contribute his ideas to the company. In April 2010, the NBC network created a website for the Kabletown company. When asked by a contributor from The Philadelphia Inquirer why the characters on 30 Rock refer to the network's new owner as "Kabletown, with a K", co-showrunner and executive producer Robert Carlock revealed that the reason for this was that the staff writers came up with the name "Cabletown", however, they later learned that there was a real company with a similar name, so NBC's legal team department "wanted to emphasize the difference, and after a while, everyone just liked the sound of it."

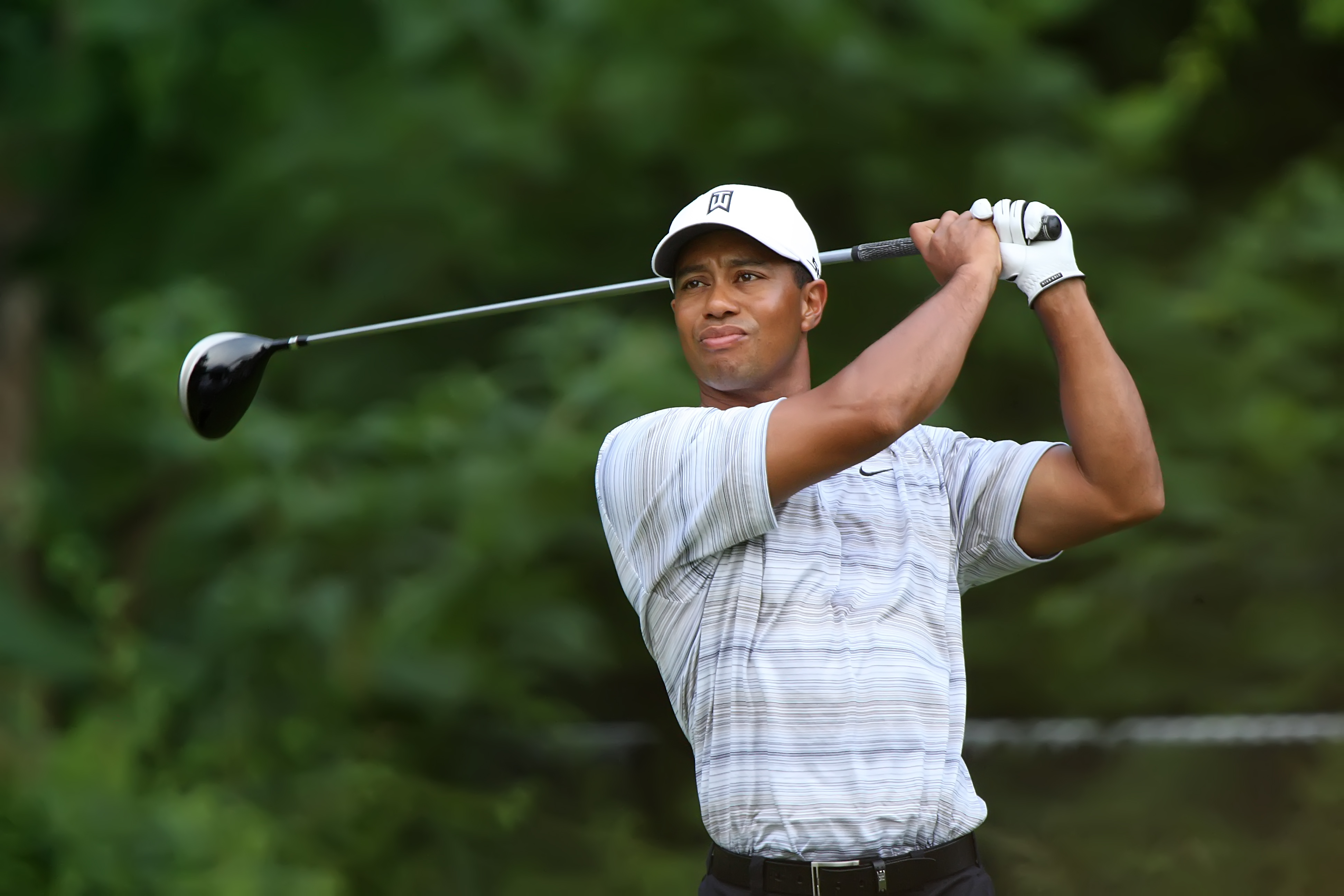
Tracy's plot in the episode referenced professional golfer Tiger Woods' (pictured) extramarital affairs scandal.

Tracy Jordan's storyline in which his former nanny writes a tell-all book revealing that he has never actually had an affair with anyone mirrored—though in reversal—the real life of professional golfer Tiger Woods' extramarital affairs scandal that occurred in late 2009. In one scene, it is revealed that women have come forward admitting to never have had a sexual relationship with Tracy; After news broke of Woods's infidelities, numerous women came forward admitting to having affairs with the golfer. To re-establish his womanizing persona, Tracy holds a press conference announcing he is leaving show business to spend more time with a stripper; In December 2009, Woods announced he would take an indefinite leave from professional golf to focus on his marriage after he admitted infidelity. Other women, who Tracy did not have a relationship with, have released voice mails to the news media. In one of them, Tracy leaves a message to his wife, Angie (Sherri Shepherd), in which he is loving and sincere in the message; One of Woods's mistresses produced voice and text messages as evidence of a relationship with the golfer. As a result of him being outed as monogamous, Tracy loses various endorsements; After admitting to his affairs, Woods lost various endorsement deals with different companies.

== Cultural references ==
In the beginning of the episode, Jack announces at a staff meeting that NBC has been bought by Kabletown, a company network from Philadelphia. Immediately, Jack and Liz exchange opinions about Philadelphia and Boston; Liz, who grew up near Philadelphia, declares "Go Eagles! Philly rules! Cheesesteaks! Bobby Clarke! Will Smith! [Boston] sucks!". Jack, who is from Boston, responds "Boston is the greatest city in the world. Boston Tea Party. Boston cream pie. Boston Rob Mariano. Birthplace of Benjamin Franklin." Liz interjects "Yeah, then [Franklin] looked around, realized it sucked, and moved to Philadelphia!" Jack and the New York staff then deride the city of Los Angeles, provoking an NBC executive teleconferencing in from Los Angeles to assert that "LA rules: Michael Bay, freeways, Legoland—" before Jack shuts off his feed. While meeting with Kabletown executives, Jack learns that they focus on adult films and sees their list of features, including Assatar, The Lovely Boners, The Hind Side, and Fresh-Ass: Based on the Novel Tush by Assfire, puns on the 2009 films Avatar, The Lovely Bones, The Blind Side, and Precious: Based on the Novel "Push" by Sapphire.

Jenna claims to Tracy that she "ate the pig that played Babe", in a reference to the 1995 film Babe based on the British novel The Sheep-Pig. At Don Geiss's funeral, the trumpet solo that his daughter Kathy Geiss (Marceline Hugot) performs is Ellens dritter Gesang by Franz Schubert, a melody best known as a setting for the Latin Catholic prayer Ave Maria.

When Liz tells Tracy that he has a life with his family and should enjoy it after Tracy tries to have sex with her in order to restore his womanizing reputation, she tells him "You know what I have? A Sims family that keeps getting murdered." The Sims is a video game in which players create virtual people called "Sims" and places them in houses and helps direct their moods and satisfy their desires. Tracy responds "One day, you will have what I have because you are an amazing, strong, intelligent woman, like Hilary ... from Fresh Prince of Bel-Air." The Fresh Prince of Bel-Air was a series that previously aired on NBC, and the Hilary character was a dull-witted individual who lacked intelligence. Before going their separate ways, Liz discovers that Wesley's last name is Snipes, but Wesley tells her that it is a name more fitting for a "pale English guy", than actor Wesley Snipes. Liz and Wesley also attend a second run of the movie Hot Tub Time Machine, which provokes arguments between them despite their mutual enjoyment of the film.

Star Wars is frequently referenced in 30 Rock, beginning with the pilot episode in 2006 where Tracy is seen shouting that he is a Jedi. Liz admits to being a huge fan of Star Wars, saying that she had watched it many times with Pete Hornberger (Scott Adsit), and dressed up as the Star Wars character Princess Leia during four recent Halloweens, and while trying to get out of jury duty in Chicago and New York. Star Wars is also referenced when Tracy takes on the identity of the character Chewbacca. In this episode, at Don Geiss's funeral, he is shown to be frozen in carbonite similar to that of Star Wars character Han Solo in the 1980 film The Empire Strikes Back. Fey, a fan of Star Wars herself, said that the weekly Star Wars joke or reference "started happening organically" when the crew realized that they had a Star Wars reference "in almost every show". Fey said that from then on "it became a thing where [they] tried to keep it going", and that even though they could not include one in every episode, they still had a "pretty high batting average". Fey attributed most of the references to executive producer and writer Robert Carlock, whom she described as "the resident expert".

== Reception ==
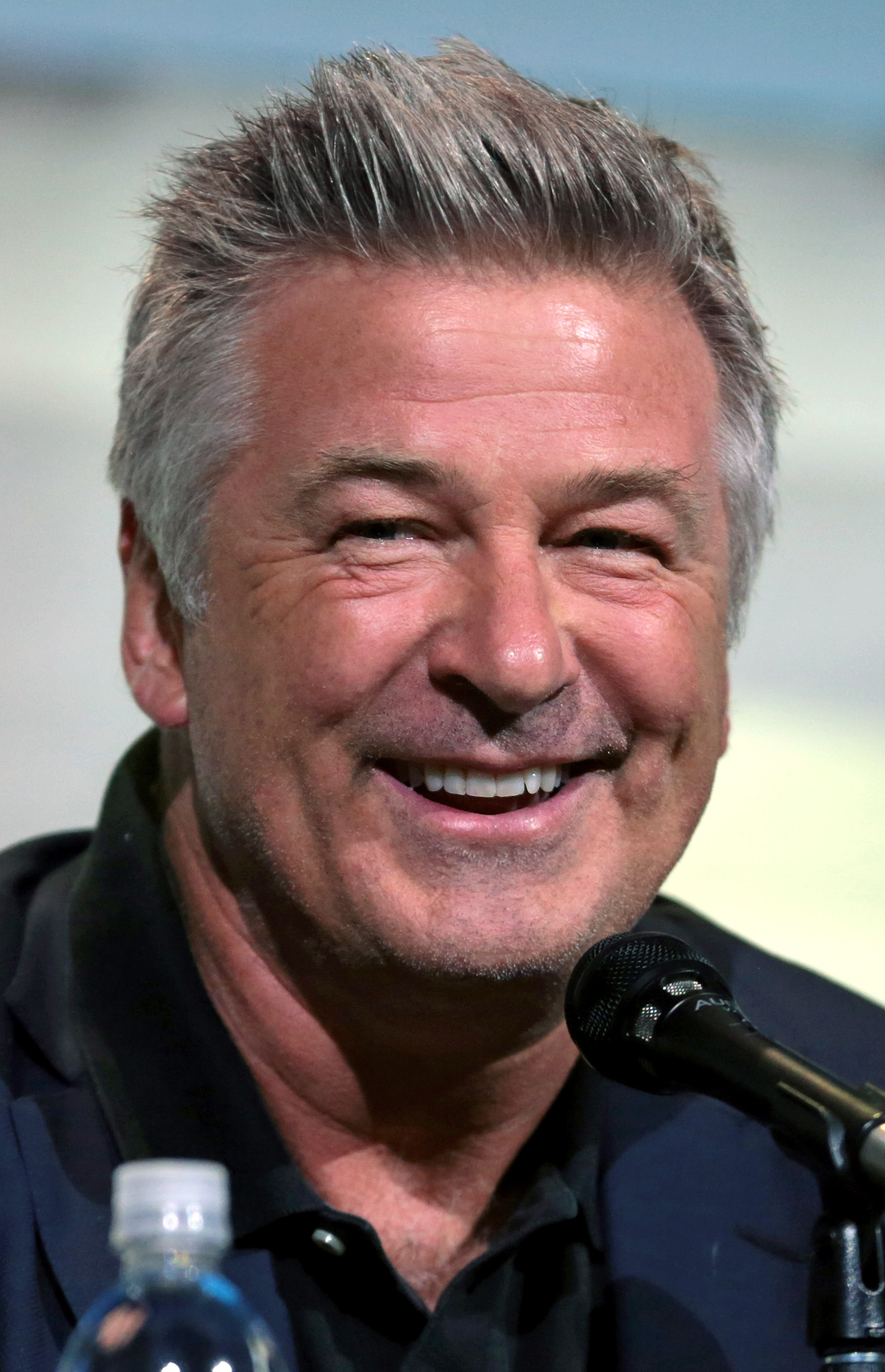
Alec Baldwin received an Emmy nomination for Outstanding Lead Actor in a Comedy Series for his work in this episode.

According to the Nielsen Media Research, "Don Geiss, America and Hope" was watched by 6.857 million viewers during its original United States broadcast. The rating was a 3 percent increase in viewership from the previous week's episode, "Future Husband", which was seen by 5.894 million American viewers. The show claimed a 3.0 rating/9 share among viewers aged 18 to 49, meaning that 3.0 percent of all people in that group, and 9 percent of all people from that group watching television at the time, watched the episode. For his work in this episode, Alec Baldwin received a Primetime Emmy Award nomination in the category for Outstanding Lead Actor in a Comedy Series at the 62nd Primetime Emmy Awards, but lost it to actor Jim Parsons.

Television columnist Alan Sepinwall of The Star-Ledger wrote that despite "Don Geiss, America and Hope" not being "strong" as the last episode it had "many funny moments scattered throughout" that he was satisfied with. He noted that the uncomfortable relationship between Liz and Wesley "worked better" here than previously. Sepinwall said it "was a good story" for Jack's character, and that it was "nice" to see 30 Rock "fearless about mocking their future Comcast overlords as they are at making fun of NBC". The A.V. Club's Nathan Rabin enjoyed Michael Sheen's return, said that every part of Liz and Wesley's story was "brilliant". He observed that Jack's midlife crisis here was "poignant as well as funny." Overall, Rabin gave it a B+ rating, and concluded "...it was a rock-solid episode". Despite enjoying Sheen's role on the show, Time contributor James Poniewozik confessed he had a problem with his story arc with Tina Fey's Liz. "I assume that [Sheen] is not going to become a permanent cast member, and so however much I might enjoy parts of this story, I can never forget that this is probably one more relationship that Liz will go through and end up at status quo ante." Bob Sassone of AOL's TV Squad was complimentary towards the NBC/Kabletown deal, enjoyed Tracy's subplot, noting it gave the character "something important to do ... it also shined some new light on the Tracy Morgan character." Adam Mersel for TV Guide reasoned "I can officially say that almost no episode of 30 Rock falls flat for me, and this one certainly didn't [...] All in all, this is one of my favorite episodes of the season." Paste magazine contributor Sean Gandert was favorable to it, noting "I'm not sure when the last time I thought every plot in a 30 Rock episode was a winner, but 'Don Geiss, Hope and America' delivered on the exuberant claims of the episode's title". Nick Catucci of New York magazine wrote that Jack trying to fit in at Kabletown, along with his suggestion of "porn for women", was "meh", Liz dealing with Wesley and Tracy "dealing with the world's discovery of his fidelity to his wife" were all "quite comfortably situated in the show's wheelhouse".

Not all reviews were positive. IGN contributor Robert Canning felt that "Don Geiss, American and Hope" felt "a bit rudderless as well. The main stories eventually crossed over in meaningful ways, but aside from those connections, their direction was a bit weak and unsure. They all had a great bit or two ... but the general feel of the episode was mostly blah. That could likely be the result of the main characters coming off as mostly blah." In conclusion, Canning gave it a 7.5 out of 10 rating. Meredith Blake, a contributor for the Los Angeles Times, was not positive towards Fey and Sheen's story here, explaining that the premise of the two characters settling for one another "fell flat" and "it just wasn't as funny as it could have been."
