= Brandon Auret =

South African actor (born 1972)

- Born: 27 December 1972 (age 53); Johannesburg, South Africa
- Occupation: Actor
- Years active: 1998—present

Brandon Auret (born 27 December 1972) is a South African actor known for his role as Leon du Plessis in the SABC3 soap opera Isidingo.

== Early life ==
Auret was born 27 December 1972 in the South African city of Johannesburg. He currently resides in Gauteng, South Africa.

== Acting career ==
Auret played the role of Leon du Plessis from 1998 to 2005. After leaving this soap opera he starred in the GO/M-Net dramatic series Angel's Song as William. This role was from 2006 through 2007. His other television acting credits include: Zet, Egoli, SOS, Laugh Out Loud, One Way, Wild at Heart and Tshisa.

Auret also appears in the South African movie District 9.

His stage credits include: Joseph and the Amazing Technicolor Dreamcoat, Sleeping Beauty, The Buddy Holly Story, Alladin, The Doo-Wah Boys, Summer Holiday, Forever Young, Jukebox Hero, Debbie Does Dallas, Khalushi and Strictly Come Party.

Auret is a co-owner and producer of the broadcast media and film production company A Breed Apart Pictures.

== Filmography ==
Film and television
Year	Title	Role
1998	The Message	Agent Bennett
2006	Isidingo	Leon du Plessis
2006	Angel's Song	William Frost
2006-2007	One Way	Michael Williams
2008	Hansie: A True Story	Frans Cronje
2008	Swop!	David Kane
2009	Wild at Heart	Pilot
2009	District 9	MNU Mercenary
2010	The Race-ist	Fillus
2010	Night Drive	Ian
2011	Expiration	William Hunter
2013	Durban Poison	Piet
2013	Elysium	Drake
2013	Avenged	Warren
2013	Tanks and Bicycles	Wickus
2014	Outpost 37	Savino
2014	Prime Circle: Doors	Lead astronaut
2015	Tiger House	Reg
2015	Chappie	Hippo
2015	Tremors 5: Bloodlines	Johan Dreyer
2017	Double Echo	Paul Mullen
2017	Rakka	Nosh
2017	The Lullaby	Dr. Timothy Reed
2018	Samson	Ashdod
2018	The Scorpion King: Book of Souls	Scar-faced Jackal
2020	Rogue	Elijah Dekker
2022	Redeeming Love	Magowan
2023	Rebel Moon	Faunus
