= Anna Howard Shaw Day =

- 30 Rock episode
- Episode no.: Season 4 Episode 13
- Directed by: Ken Whittingham
- Written by: Matt Hubbard
- Production code: 413
- Original air date: February 11, 2010

Guest appearances
- Elizabeth Banks as Avery Jessup; Jon Hamm as Drew Baird; Shinnerrie Jackson as a dental receptionist; Jon Bon Jovi as himself; Douglas Rees as Walter Stein; Horatio Sanz as Maynard Roger Hoynes; Jason Sudeikis as Floyd DeBarber; Dean Winters as Dennis Duffy

Episode chronology
← Previous "Verna"	Next → "Future Husband"
- 30 Rock season 4

"Anna Howard Shaw Day" is the thirteenth episode of the fourth season of the American television comedy series 30 Rock, and the 71st episode of the series overall. It was written by supervising producer Matt Hubbard and directed by Ken Whittingham. The episode originally aired on NBC in the United States on February 11, 2010. Elizabeth Banks, Jon Hamm, Shinnerrie Jackson, Douglas Rees, Horatio Sanz, Jason Sudeikis, and Dean Winters guest star in this episode, and there is a cameo appearance by musician Jon Bon Jovi.

In the episode, Liz Lemon (Tina Fey) schedules a dentist appointment on Valentine's Day to avoid feeling lonely on the holiday. Meanwhile, Jack Donaghy (Alec Baldwin) meets a successful and attractive CNBC host (Banks). Elsewhere, Jenna Maroney (Jane Krakowski) is frustrated when her stalker (Sanz) finally loses interest.

"Anna Howard Shaw Day" was generally, though not universally, well received among television critics. According to the Nielsen ratings, it was watched by 6.004 million households during its original broadcast, and received a 2.8 rating/7 share among viewers in the 18–49 demographic. For his work in this episode, Matt Hubbard received a Primetime Emmy Award nomination in the category for Outstanding Writing in a Comedy Series.

== Plot ==
TGS with Tracy Jordan head writer Liz Lemon is due for a root canal. To avoid feeling lonely on Valentine's Day, she schedules her surgery for that day, but soon realizes she will need someone to escort her home from the dentist's office due to the aftereffects of anesthesia. She asks her colleagues at the 30 Rock building for a ride home, but all of them have Valentine's Day plans and cannot help. When Liz calls the dentist's office to say she does not have anyone to pick her up, the receptionist (Shinnerrie Jackson) informs her that after her procedure she can only leave alone if she signs a liability waiver. Liz initially intends to sign the document, but is dissuaded at a party by musician Jon Bon Jovi, and instead decides to claim to the receptionist that she has a ride home after all.

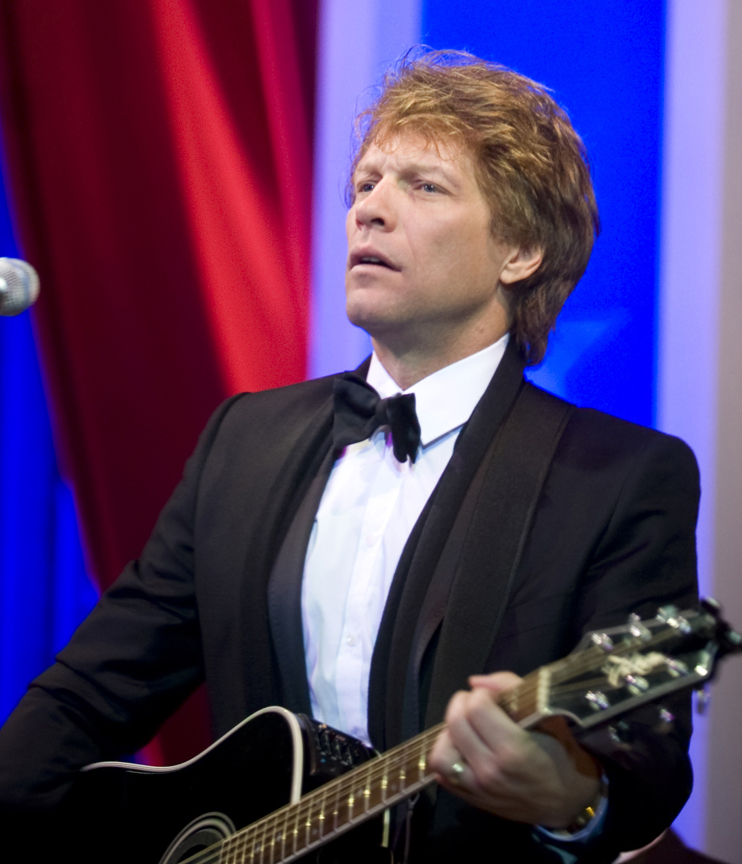
Jon Bon Jovi appeared as himself in this episode as NBC's Artist in residence.

Jack Donaghy, who is Vice President of East Coast Television and Microwave Oven Programming for General Electric, makes an appearance on the fictional CNBC show The Hot Box. During the appearance, Jack interacts with the show's host, Avery Jessup (Elizabeth Banks), with the two flirting during the broadcast. Avery and Jack share Republican viewpoints, and she asks him out for a drink after the show, which he accepts. They eventually embark on a number of both successful and unsuccessful dates. During one of those dates, Jack invites her to a TGS VIP party he has hastily staged, whereupon he enlists the help of Jon Bon Jovi—at the time NBC's real-life Artist in Residence—to come over and talk to them, in an effort to impress the successful Avery. When Bon Jovi approaches them, though, Jack disregards him due to his own intriguing conversation with Avery, which impresses her even more. After the TGS party, the two go back to Jack's apartment and end up sleeping together.

Elsewhere Jenna begins to worry that her stalker, Maynard Roger Hoynes (Horatio Sanz), has lost interest in her. Jenna tracks down Maynard and her suspicions are confirmed, after he tells her that his therapist encouraged him to stop his obsession with her and move forward. Later, in the 30 Rock building, NBC page Kenneth Parcell (Jack McBrayer) finds Jenna upset in her dressing room. She tells him why she is in that state and shows him letters that Maynard sent to her in the past. Kenneth, however, is confused as to why Jenna misses her stalker, leading her to reveal that Maynard has been the longest relationship she has ever had. The next day, Jenna enters her dressing room and sees that her picture is inscribed with the words "I want to eat your boogers." Jenna is touched to find that Kenneth is responsible for the graffito, and thanks him for his thoughtfulness.

On Valentine's Day, Liz goes to her dentist appointment and tells the receptionist that she did not sign the waiver. After her surgery, Liz reassures the dental staff that the anesthesia is having no effect on her and can take herself home. In the lobby, Liz sees her former boyfriends Drew Baird (Jon Hamm), Dennis Duffy (Dean Winters), and Floyd DeBarber (Jason Sudeikis), and is moved that they came back so that she not be alone on Valentine's Day. Liz is hallucinating, however, and the people she sees as Drew, Dennis, and Floyd are actually the three Jamaican women who are dental assistants at the oral surgeon's office. One of them calls Jack, Liz's boss, asking if he could come pick up Liz and take her home. Jack had just spent the night with Avery, who thinks that the phone call was made up by Jack as an excuse to end the date, but when he invites her to come along, she is impressed by his kindness to Liz.

== Production ==
"Anna Howard Shaw Day" was written by 30 Rock supervising producer Matt Hubbard and directed by Ken Whittingham. This episode was Hubbard's ninth writing credit, and the second episode for Whittingham who had directed the March 12, 2009, season three episode "The Funcooker". "Anna Howard Shaw Day" originally aired in the United States on February 11, 2010, on NBC as the thirteenth episode of the show's fourth season and the 71st overall episode of the series. This episode was filmed on December 9, 2009, and January 27, 2010.

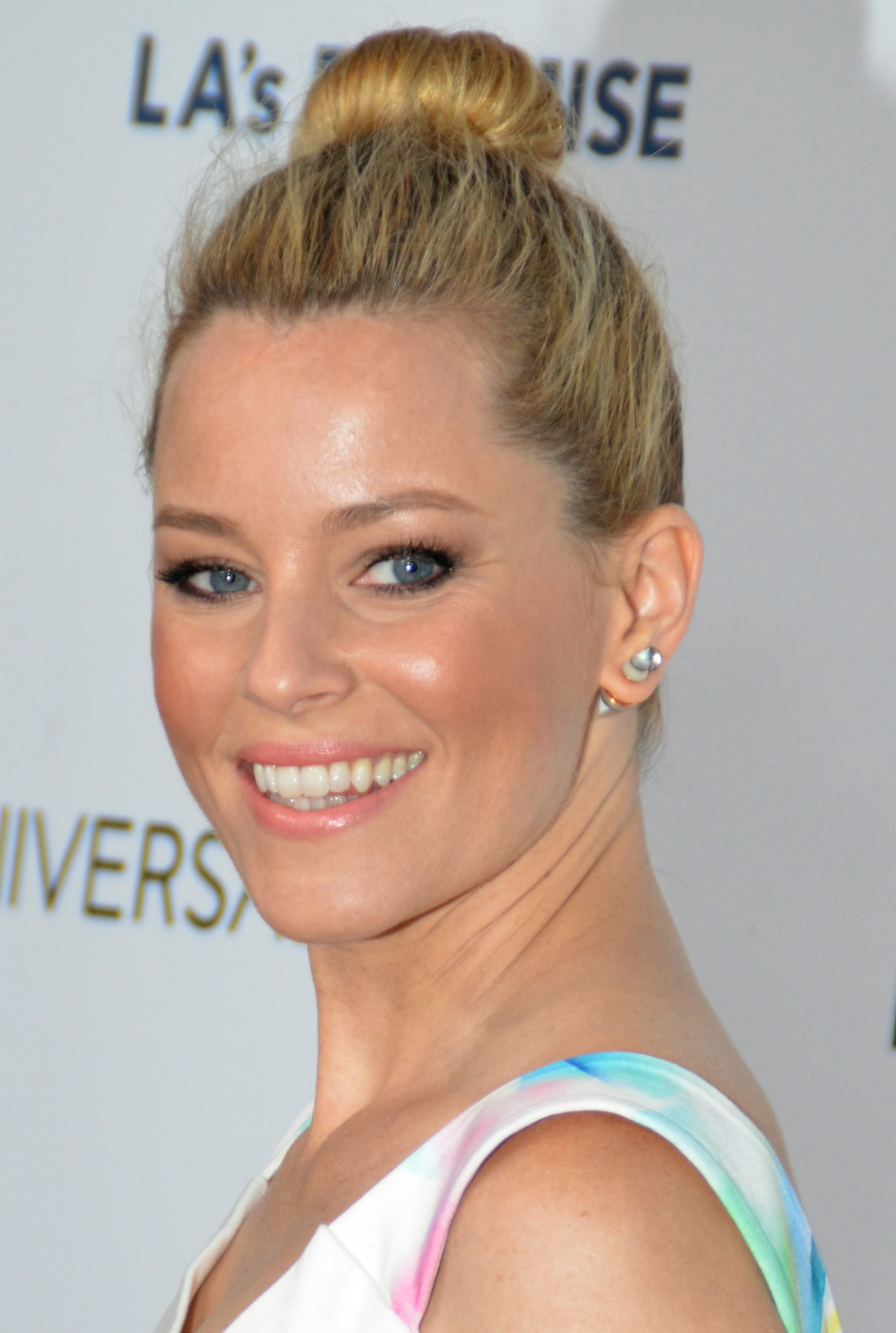
Elizabeth Banks made her 30 Rock debut as CNBC anchor Avery Jessup in this episode.

In December 2009, it was confirmed that actress Elizabeth Banks would guest star on the show, and in this episode, she played right-wing CNBC anchor Avery Jessup, and love interest to Alec Baldwin's Jack Donaghy. In an interview with Entertainment Weekly's Michael Ausiello, Banks revealed that she approached the show's staff about making an appearance on the show. "I definitely put feelers out, like, 'I would love to be on your show.' And they did it. They made it happen! I'm a huge fan, so this is a dream come true." She said that on her first day on set she "begged" producers if she could use a teleprompter—in which she is first introduced in the episode on the set of her show The Hot Box, with her interviewing Jack and another guest (Douglas Rees)—so that she could deliver her lines quickly, explaining that her fast delivery would help "sell" the comedy and her 30 Rock character. They agreed to it, though, a problem ensued when they could not figure the prompter out, which resulted in Banks "throwing fastballs at [Baldwin] and him battling them back as fast as possible and hoping they could cut it together faster than we were doing it." Banks revealed to Ausiello that she had no intention on becoming a series regular, explaining that she has been having "too much fun" making movies to commit to a television show full-time.

In October 2009, it was reported that musician Jon Bon Jovi would serve as the first artist in NBC's brand new "artist in residence" program. In a November 25, 2009, appearance on NBC's The Today Show, Jon Bon Jovi explained that his band (Bon Jovi) had released a new album, The Circle, and that for two months the group would be making appearances on a wide range of NBC broadcast and cable channels to promote it. On 30 Rock, Jon Bon Jovi played himself and his title as artist in residence was referenced, in which he appears as a contestant on the Bravo cooking reality television series Top Chef, and is later shown strumming the NBC Nightly News theme.

Actors Jon Hamm, Jason Sudeikis, and Dean Winters reprised their roles, respectively, as Drew Baird, Floyd DeBarber, and Dennis Duffy; former boyfriends of Liz Lemon (Fey). In the final scene of "Anna Howard Shaw Day", in which she is still under the after effects of anesthesia, Liz "sees" Drew, Floyd, and Dennis speak in Jamaican accents, however, the three men are really three Jamaican dental assistants. In regards to the accent, Hamm said in an interview "That was given to me literally the day before we shot it. They were like, 'We wrote some more stuff, so we'll see you tomorrow.' I was like, 'Okay, how much more can it be? Oh great, it's a completely different take, awesome.'"

Comedic actor Jason Sudeikis, who appeared in this episode as Floyd DeBarber, was at the time a main cast member of Saturday Night Live (SNL). Additionally in this episode, Horatio Sanz, who played Maynard Roger Hoynes—Jenna Maroney's stalker—has also appeared in the main cast of SNL. Fey was the head writer on SNL from 1999 until 2006.

== Cultural references ==
The name of "Anna Howard Shaw Day" is based on Liz's hatred of Valentine's Day, for which she substitutes "Anna Howard Shaw Day", a fictional holiday celebrating the real February 14 birthday of Woman's Civil Rights leader Anna Howard Shaw. Liz tells Jack that she does not watch CNBC, a business news channel, but that she gets all her money advice from a fictitious cartoon character, Foxy Moneybags, on PBS. While confronting him, Jenna asks Maynard if the dog who gives him his orders has died, a reference to the Son of Sam killer allegedly being commanded to kill by a neighbor's possessed dog. As he does not stalk her anymore, Jenna asks Maynard if he is stalking "one of those kids from Glee", the latter being a Fox program that focuses on a high school show choir. During his appearance on The Hot Box, Avery asks Jack what his favorite movie is with him responding that it is a tie with The Fountainhead (1949) and Uncle Buck (1989). During her hallucination, in which she sees Drew, Dennis, and Floyd, Liz confesses to Dennis that watching the period drama The Color Purple with him drunk "was one of the funnest nights of my life."

The character Astronaut Mike Dexter was referenced in this episode, in which Liz tells the dental receptionist that she did not sign the liability waiver as her "boyfriend" Mike Dexter would come and take her home. Liz considers the character to be her imaginary perfect husband. The character was first introduced in "Sun Tea", in which "Dot Com" Slattery (Kevin Brown) pretended to be Mike Dexter, Liz's "crazy black boyfriend", after she planned to get her roommate out of his apartment with Dot Com's help, but her plan backfired. In "Dealbreakers Talk Show", Liz's imagination of Mike Dexter was played by actor John Anderson, in a scene where Liz fantasizes about what her life would be like following the success of her talk show, and is then notified by Mike Dexter that he has to go back to outer space. Astronaut Mike Dexter would be mentioned further in the season, but near its end Liz decides her infatuation with him is pathetic and "breaks up" with him in a dream; along with her S4 finale meeting of a pilot played by Matt Damon and her brusque breakup with and dismissal of an annoying anti-love interest played by Michael Sheen; this sets the stage for Liz Lemon to be portrayed as much less of a loser from Season 5 through the series finale.

== Reception ==
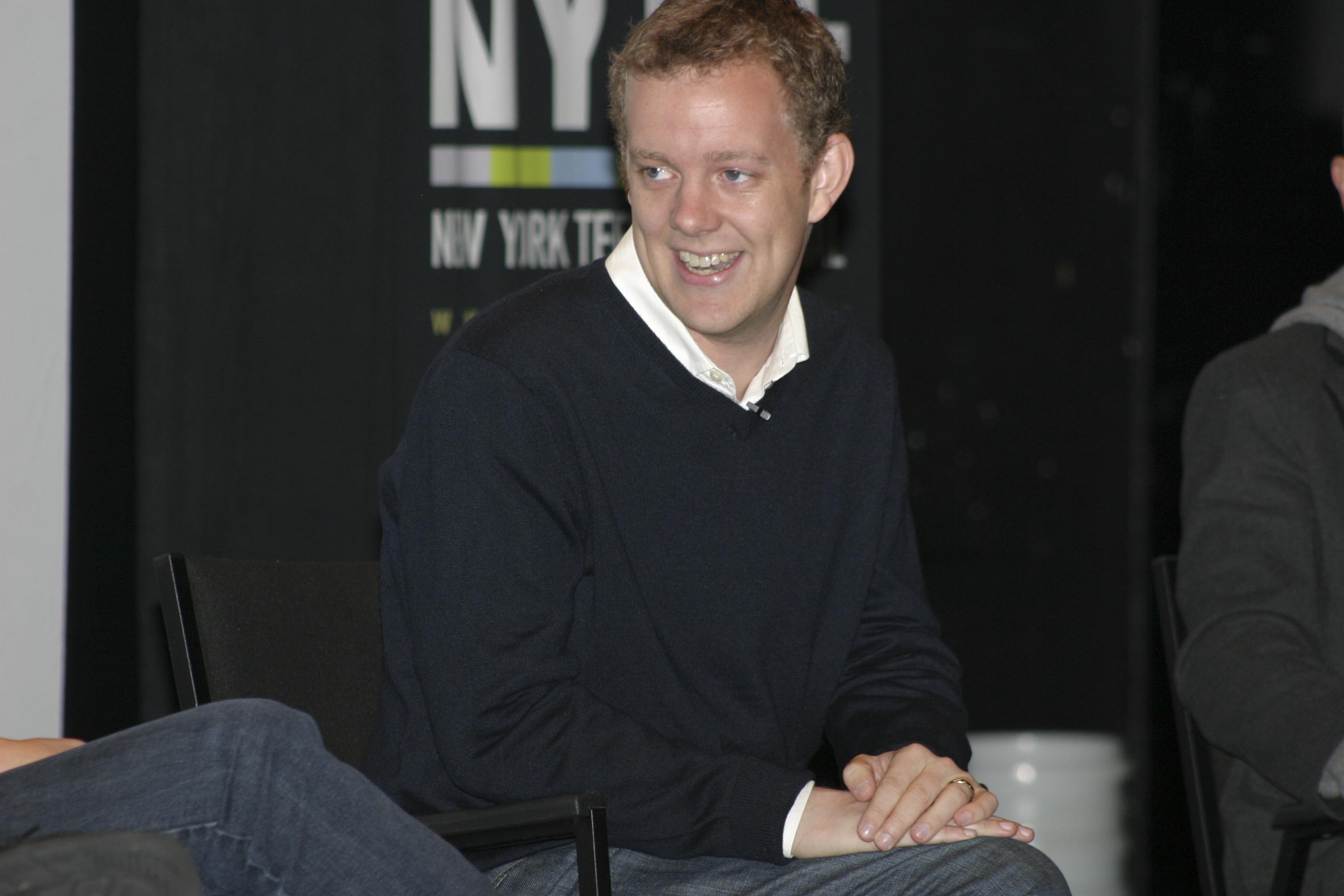
Matt Hubbard (pictured) received an Emmy nomination for Outstanding Writing in a Comedy Series.

In its original American broadcast, "Anna Howard Shaw Day" was seen by 6.004 million households, according to the Nielsen ratings. The show claimed a 2.8 rating/7 share among viewers aged 18 to 49, meaning that 2.8 percent of all people in that group, and 7 percent of all people from that group watching television at the time, watched the episode. This was an increase from the previous episode, "Verna", which was watched by 5.93 million American viewers. Matt Hubbard received a Primetime Emmy Award nomination for Outstanding Writing in a Comedy Series at the 62nd Primetime Emmy Awards, but lost it to Modern Family's Steven Levitan and Christopher Lloyd for their work on the pilot episode. In December 2010, Hubbard received a Writers Guild of America Award nomination for "Anna Howard Shaw Day". In reviewing the best television programs of 2010, The A.V. Club named 30 Rock number 18 and cited this episode as amongst the best of the year.

The A.V. Club's Nathan Rabin enjoyed Elizabeth Banks' appearance, writing that she played her character "perfectly" and hoped she returned to the series. Rabin was "delighted" to see the show "get back some of its blinding speed", regarding some episodes of the show's fourth season not getting well-received reception, as it was Jack and Avery's courtship here that "was a refreshing reminder of just how fucking sharp 30 Rock can be." Sean Gandert of Paste was appreciative towards Banks' role, noted that Jon Bon Jovi's appearance was "completely unnecessary but pretty awesome nonetheless", and concluded that Liz and Jack's plotlines were "particularly strong" and that despite not anything "new" occurring here "it was largely just some fun, top-form 30 Rock." Meredith Blake, a contributor of the Los Angeles Times, opined that the three plots featured were "equally strong", and added that Jenna's stalker plot "could easily have fallen flat" but it turned out to be very funny. In conclusion, Blake deemed this a "stellar episode, and it was especially enjoyable" than last week's episode, "Verna". Adam Mersel of TV Guide reported that the Valentine's Day theme in the episode was "hilarious", as it was "full of the usual belly-laughs and spit-takes." Entertainment Weekly contributor Margaret Lyons commented that it was "one of the loopiest, silliest episodes in a while, but it worked." Lyons enjoyed Tina Fey's performance here, writing that it provided Fey with her "most interesting acting showcase all season".

IGN contributor Robert Canning said that this episode of 30 Rock "wasn't as fun and funny as it could have been", explaining that it had some great laughs, but that as a whole it "felt a bit flat and joyless." He wrote that the cameos by Jon Hamm, Jason Sudeikis, and Dean Winters "did little in the body of the episode", nonetheless, the "real payoff" came in the end when the three portrayed the dental assistants. "It was a gag mostly unrelated to the rest of the episode, and it was the best part of the half hour." In conclusion, Canning gave it a 7.7 out of 10 rating. Television columnist Alan Sepinwall of The Star-Ledger wrote that the episode was a "pretty lifeless outing", reasoning it had the "usual laughs in the margin" but overall "there were a lot of long, flat, deadly stretches, and entire subplots like Jenna with her stalker that just lay there." Bob Sassone of AOL's TV Squad enjoyed Liz's story here, but noted that he disliked Jenna's stalker story, concluding "...there were a few really funny lines ... but overall I found her missing-her-stalker-on-Valentine's-Day plot to be rather ... icky [...] Honestly, I want to see more of the human, normal side of Jenna". Nick Catucci of New York magazine felt that Liz's plot here was "one of the worst story lines in recent memory".
