= Friend Request =

- German theatrical release poster
- Directed by: Simon Verhoeven
- Written by: Matthew Ballen; Philip Koch; Simon Verhoeven
- Produced by: Quirin Berg; Max Wiedemann
- Starring: Alycia Debnam-Carey; William Moseley; Connor Paolo; Brit Morgan; Liesl Ahlers
- Cinematography: Jo Heim
- Edited by: Tom Seil; Denis Bachter
- Music by: Gary Go; Martin Todsharow
- Production companies: Wiedemann & Berg Film; SevenPictures Film; Two Oceans Productions
- Distributed by: Warner Bros. Pictures
- Release date: 7 January 2016 (Germany)
- Running time: 92 minutes
- Countries: Germany; South Africa
- Language: English
- Budget: $9.9 million
- Box office: $11 million

Friend Request (released internationally as Unfriend) is a 2016 English-language supernatural psychological horror film directed by Simon Verhoeven. The film was released in Germany on January 7, 2016, and received generally negative reviews from critics.

== Plot ==
Laura Woodson is a popular campus student with over 800 friends on Facebook. She lives with Olivia Mathison, Isabelle, and Gustavo Garcia, Isabelle's boyfriend. She is close friends with Kobe and is dating Tyler McCormick.

Laura receives a friend request from her classmate Marina Mills. Noticing she has no friends, she accepts and the two begin a relationship as friends, but she is uncomfortable with Marina's obsessive behavior and sees that her Facebook profile is full of negative posts. Marina wants to attend Laura's birthday dinner but Laura lies and says only she and Tyler are going out. That night, Marina sees pictures of Laura and her friends on Facebook, and angrily confronts her the next day. During their quarrel, Laura accidentally reveals Marina's bald spot, a result of hair pulling disorder. She then unfriends Marina on Facebook.

The next morning, it is announced that Marina committed suicide. Laura feels responsible but tries to forget about it until Marina uploads a video showing her burning a sketch of Laura before hanging herself. The video is somehow posted on Laura's own page and she is unable to remove it or delete her account. Marina adds Gustavo as a friend. He is then terrorized by a demonic spirit and has his face smashed by an invisible entity. Isabelle discovers him and is sent to the hospital. A video of Gustavo's apparent suicide is posted on Laura's page, damaging her reputation even further.

Laura and Kobe break into Marina's dorm room and find an old class photograph from an orphanage. Laura visits the orphanage and discovers Marina's real last name is Nedifar, and she was tormented by two boys when she was younger. The boys were murdered, with their faces mutilated and swarmed by black wasps, the same way Gustavo died. Her mother had been part of a commune, rumored to be a demonic cult, until someone set it on fire. Her mother, then pregnant, was horribly burned and rendered brain dead, so doctors performed a C-section to deliver Marina. Kobe does research on black mirrors, which they keep seeing, and learns that they were mostly used by witches.

Isabelle becomes Marina's next victim. A video of her killing herself is posted on Laura's page. Olivia is attacked and, after being possessed, kills herself. Laura and Kobe go in search of the place where Marina committed suicide to destroy the black mirror she died in front of, as that is what she used to become an evil spirit to torment Laura. Kobe, realizing he is the next victim, becomes deranged, and stabs Laura, hoping to kill her and save himself.

She escapes and learns that Marina killed herself in a nearby factory. Tyler finds Laura, but Kobe kills him. After Laura reaches a dead end, Kobe gets killed by the swarm of wasps. Laura finally finds Marina's burned corpse and, after staring at her laptop, a demonic Marina lunges at her.

In the epilogue, Laura, dressed in a hoodie, looks at a few girls the same way that Marina looked at Laura in the beginning, implying that Laura has been possessed by Marina.

== Cast ==
- Alycia Debnam-Carey as Laura Woodson
- William Moseley as Tyler McCormick
- Connor Paolo as Kobe
- Brit Morgan as Olivia Mathison
- Brooke Markham as Isabel
- Sean Marquette as Gustavo Garcia
- Liesl Ahlers as Marina Mills / Marina Nedifar
- Shashawnee Hall as Detective Cameron
- Nick Pauling as Detective Cameron's officer
- Susan Danford as Caroline Woodson, Laura's mother

== Production ==
Originally titled Unknown Error, the film was later renamed to Friend Request internationally, to avoid confusion with the 2014 film Unfriended. In Germany, the film is titled Unfriend, since Unfriended was released as Unknown User in Germany.

=== Filming ===
The film was shot in Cape Town at the University of Cape Town, South Africa. Though the film was produced by German director Simon Verhoeven and German production companies, the largely English-speaking cast required the film to be shot in English. Filming ended in March 2014.

== Release ==
The film was released in Germany on 7 January 2016, 20 April 2016 in the United Kingdom and in the United States on 22 September 2017.

== Reception ==
=== Box office ===
Friend Request grossed $3.7 million in the United States and Canada and $7.5 million in other territories for a worldwide total of $11.3 million, against a production budget of $9.9 million.

In North America, the film was released alongside Kingsman: The Golden Circle and The Lego Ninjago Movie, and was initially projected to gross around $5 million from 2,569 theatres in its opening weekend. However, after grossing just $750,000 on its first day, weekend projections were lowered to $1.5–2 million. It ended up grossing $2 million, finishing 7th at the box office, and passing Victor Frankenstein for the lowest opening gross for a film playing in over 2,500 theatres.

=== Critical response ===
The review aggregator website Rotten Tomatoes gives the film an approval rating of 17% based on 77 reviews, with an average rating of 3.6/10. The website's critical consensus reads, "Friend Request's attempts to update old-school teen horror for the digital age do not, sadly, include memorable characters, fresh scares, or novel storytelling twists." On Metacritic, the film has a weighted average score of 31 out of 100, based on 18 critics, indicating "generally unfavorable reviews". Audiences polled by CinemaScore gave the film an average grade of "C+" on an A+ to F scale.

Frank Scheck of The Hollywood Reporter praised the film for being "visually stylish and imaginative" but criticised it for becoming less interesting as the film went on. Jessica Kiang of Variety was impressed by the practical effects, but criticised the way the film had little to do with the "technology that it ostensibly exists to critique". IGN's William Bibbiani gave it a score of 2.5/10, calling it "a sincere, and sincerely inept motion picture, and that combination makes Friend Request the exact opposite of scary. It makes it unintentionally hilarious." Jeffrey M. Anderson of Common Sense Media gave it 2/5 stars, writing, "This horror movie begins with an intriguing idea – exploring the pitfalls of social media – but quickly succumbs to routine setups and payoffs typical of most uninspired ghost stories."

Ally Wybrew of Empire gave the film 3 out of 5 stars, praising Debnam-Carey, who "[stood] out [amongst] otherwise mediocre performances" in contrast to the poorly written character of Marina. Wybrew went on to criticise the clunky lines, overenthusiastic score, and the protracted final act. The Observer's Mark Kermode also gave it 3/5 stars, writing, "Despite an overreliance on loud bangs, director Simon Verhoeven pulls off a couple of chills, even as dialogue such as: 'Unfriend that dead bitch!' keep things snarky rather than scary."
