= Future Husband =

- 30 Rock episode
- Episode no.: Season 4 Episode 14
- Directed by: Don Scardino
- Written by: Jon Haller; Tracey Wigfield
- Production code: 414
- Original air date: March 11, 2010

Guest appearances
- Elizabeth Banks as Avery Jessup; James Rebhorn as Dr. Kaplan; Michael Sheen as Wesley; Jack Welch as himself; Brian Williams as himself

Episode chronology
← Previous "Anna Howard Shaw Day"	Next → "Don Geiss, America and Hope"
- 30 Rock season 4

"Future Husband" is the fourteenth episode of the fourth season of the American television comedy series 30 Rock. It was directed by series producer Don Scardino, and written by Jon Haller and Tracey Wigfield. The episode originally aired on NBC in the United States on March 11, 2010. Elizabeth Banks, James Rebhorn, and Michael Sheen guest star in the episode, and there are cameo appearances by Jack Welch and Brian Williams.

In the episode, Liz Lemon (Tina Fey) finds a mysterious number in her phone under the name "Future Husband." At the same time, Vice President of East Coast Television and Microwave Oven Programming for General Electric (GE), Jack Donaghy (Alec Baldwin) is informed that a cable company is rumored to buy out NBC. Elsewhere, Tracy Jordan (Tracy Morgan) stages a one-man show in an attempt to win a Tony Award, as part of his EGOT quest. The episode makes reference to the real-life acquisition of NBC Universal by the cable company network Comcast.

"Future Husband" received generally mixed reviews from television critics. According to the Nielsen ratings, the episode was watched by 5.894 million households during its original broadcast, and received a 2.9 rating/8 share among viewers in the 18–49 demographic.

== Plot ==
Liz Lemon (Tina Fey) comes across an unrecognized contact in her cellphone listed as "future husband", and realizes that it must be a man she met at her dental appointment with Dr. Kaplan (James Rebhorn), while awakening from anesthesia in the recovery room after root canal surgery (seen in the previous episode). She calls the number, pretends to be the Jamaican dental receptionist, and asks the man to come back to see Dr. Kaplan. At the appointed time, she returns to the dentist's office, but does not recognize anyone there; so she calls the number again. When the man (Michael Sheen) answers, she sees him and hangs up. Unbeknownst to Liz, her number is already listed in his cellphone under "future wife". He calls her back upon seeing she called, and they arrange a date; she learns that his name is Wesley. On their date, the two fail to hit it off: they find each other annoying and share many flaws but few interests. Later, at the 30 Rock studios, Liz discovers that Wesley was the person who retrieved NBC page Kenneth Parcell's (Jack McBrayer) wallet, after Kenneth threw it out of a window earlier. Because of this coincidence, Liz and Wesley decide to go on another date.

At the same time, Jack Donaghy's (Alec Baldwin) aspirations of becoming CEO of General Electric (GE) comes to a halt when his girlfriend and CNBC host, Avery Jessup (Elizabeth Banks) informs him that the Philadelphia-based cable company Kabletown is rumored to be buying NBC. Jack—who serves as Vice President of East Coast Television and Microwave Oven Programming for GE—insists that no sale is pending, as he believes that his mentor and GE CEO Don Geiss (Rip Torn) would not agree to such a deal. As rumors persist, Jack panics, but things get worse when he learns from former GE chairman Jack Welch (as himself) that Don Geiss has been dead for weeks and that the company negotiated a takeover with Kabletown. Welch kept Geiss's death a secret while negotiations took place. Liz comforts Jack when he admits his dream of running GE is crushed. The next day, on Avery Jessup's program, The Hot Box, Jessup confirms that the buyout has gone forward, praising Jack Donaghy as a wise choice to lead Kabletown's new acquisition. Jack, who is watching the program, is cheered by this.

Elsewhere, Tracy Jordan (Tracy Morgan) performs a one-man show on Broadway so that he can be considered for a Tony Award as part of his EGOT quest. His show receives positive reviews, and Tracy is convinced that he will win a Tony, but Jenna Maroney (Jane Krakowski) tells him that in order for him to qualify for the award he must do his one-man show eight times, which worries Tracy, as he is unable to perform anything the same way twice. Despite initial reluctance to help him, Jenna eventually agrees to coach Tracy in the principles of acting, but this leads nowhere, resulting in the two arguing and Jenna telling him he can go on his show and read the phone book for all she cares. At the end of the episode, Tracy does read the phone book at his show, making Jenna very proud of him, and inexplicably drawing high praise from the audience.

== Production ==
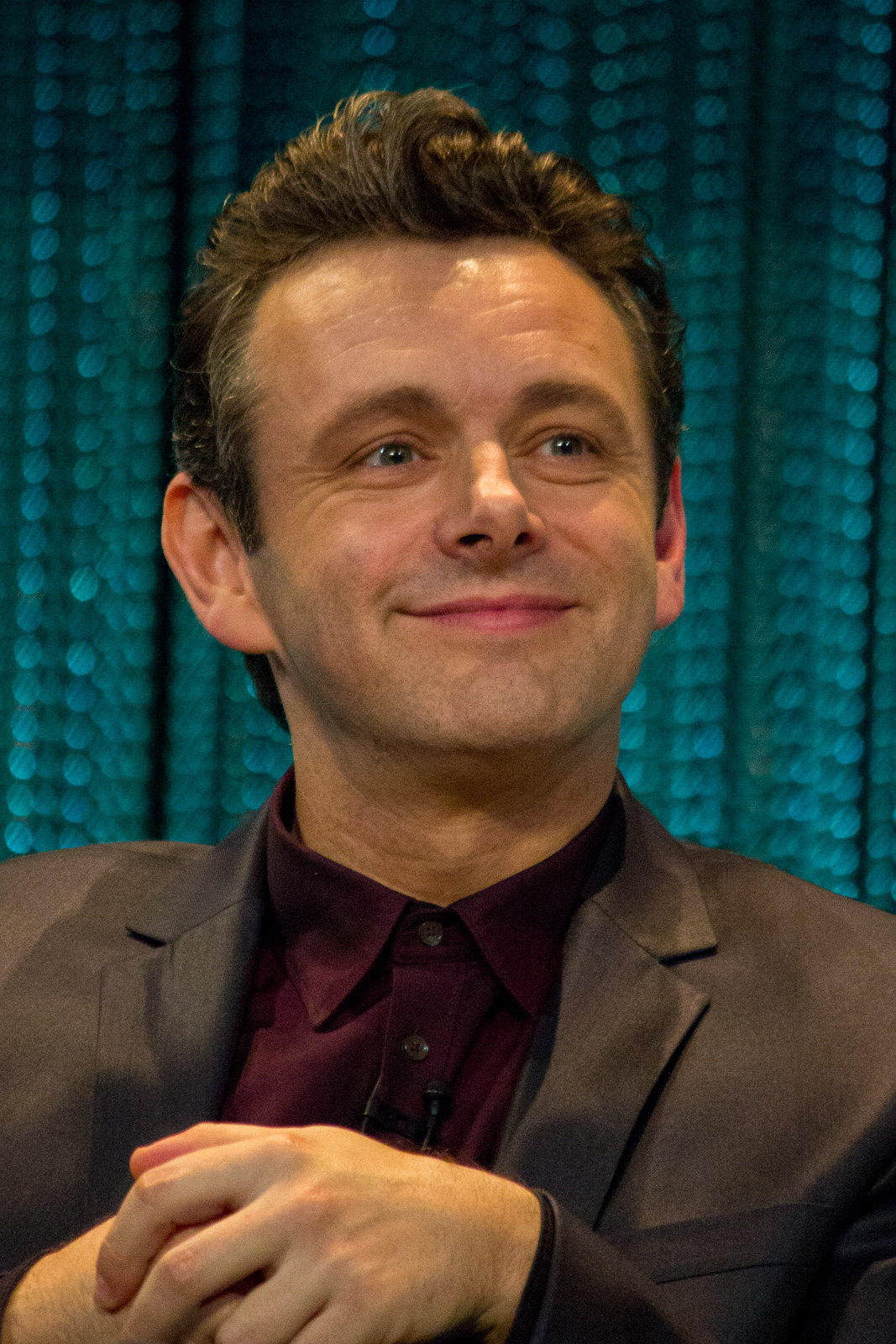
Michael Sheen made his 30 Rock debut in "Future Husband".

"Future Husband" was directed by series producer Don Scardino, and was written by Jon Haller and Tracey Wigfield. This was Haller's first penned script, and was Wigfield's second writing credit, having co-written "Jackie Jormp-Jomp" for the show's third season. "Future Husband" originally aired in the United States on March 11, 2010, on NBC as the fourteenth episode of the fourth season. This episode of 30 Rock was filmed on December 17, 2009.

In December 2009, it was confirmed that actress Elizabeth Banks would guest star on the show, and in this episode, she played right-wing CNBC anchor Avery Jessup, and love interest to the Jack Donaghy character, played by Alec Baldwin. In an interview with Entertainment Weekly, Banks revealed that she approached the 30 Rock staff about making an appearance as she is a fan of the show. "I definitely put feelers out, like, 'I would love to be on your show.' And they did it. They made it happen! I'm a huge fan, so this is a dream come true." She also revealed that she had no intention on becoming a series regular, explaining that she has been having "too much fun" making movies to commit to a television show full-time. Banks made her debut as Avery Jessup in the previous episode "Anna Howard Shaw Day". In January 2010, it was announced that actor Michael Sheen would guest star as a love interest for Liz Lemon, played by series creator Tina Fey. In this episode, he made his debut as the character Wesley. Liz and Wesley's story arc continued in the episodes "Don Geiss, America and Hope", "Emanuelle Goes to Dinosaur Land", and "I Do Do".

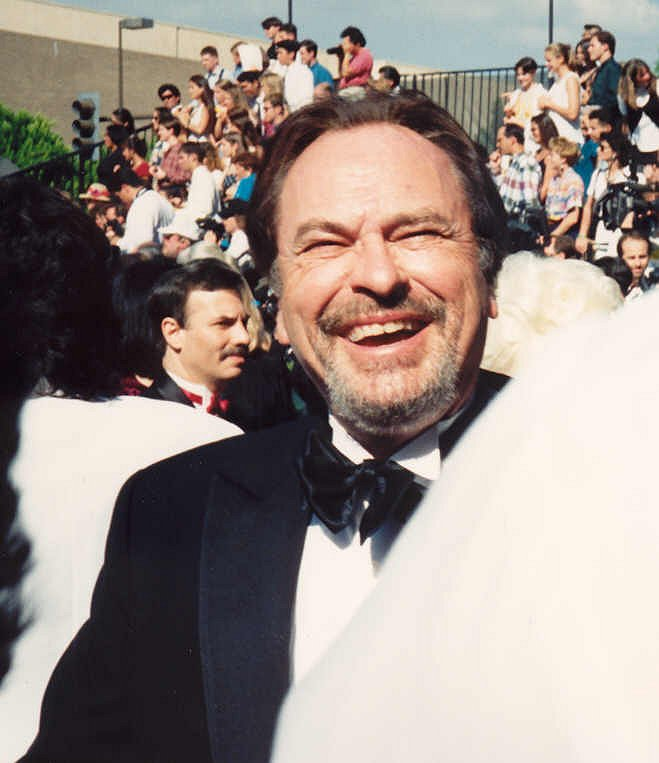
It was revealed in this episode that fictional CEO of General Electric, Don Geiss, played by Rip Torn (pictured), has died.

In "Future Husband", Jack learns from former GE chairman Jack Welch that current GE CEO Don Geiss, played by Rip Torn, has died. Torn did not make any appearances in this season, marking his last role as Don Geiss in the episode "Larry King" that aired on February 26, 2009, during the third season. Television writer Bob Sassone of TV Squad wondered if Torn was written out of the series due to an alcohol-related incident that occurred with Torn in January 2010. Welch appeared as himself here and was chairman and CEO of GE from 1981 until 2001. Actor James Rebhorn, best known for his current role as a special agent in the USA Network crime comedy-drama White Collar, made his debut as the character Dr. Kaplan, Liz and Wesley's dentist. This was news anchor Brian Williams' third guest appearance as himself. In the scene in which he appears, Williams engages in smack talk in the CNBC offices, telling Avery and her colleagues that his news program NBC Nightly News "rules".

The storyline in "Future Husband" involving the fictitious Philadelphia-based cable company Kabletown purchasing NBC is based on the acquisition of NBC Universal by Comcast in November 2009. After winning her fourth Screen Actors Guild Award as her television character at the 16th Screen Actors Guild Awards in January 2010, Fey was asked whether or not 30 Rock would make reference to the Comcast acquisition to which she said that it would be dealt with. "The sale of NBC to another company is integral to our show and it will be hard for Jack." In April 2010, the NBC network created a website for Kabletown. When asked by a contributor from The Philadelphia Inquirer why the characters on 30 Rock refer to the network's new owner as "Kabletown, with a K", co-showrunner and executive producer Robert Carlock revealed that the reason for this was that the staff writers came up with the name "Cabletown", however, they later learned that there was a real company with a similar name, so NBC's legal team department "wanted to emphasize the difference, and after a while, everyone just liked the sound of it."

This was the second time the series referenced the Tracy Jordan character trying to get his EGOT. This plot first began in the December 3, 2009, episode "Dealbreakers Talk Show" in which Tracy finds a diamond encrusted "EGOT" necklace and sets a new life goal to achieve EGOT status by winning four major awards: an Emmy, a Grammy, an Oscar, and a Tony. In the episode, Tracy performs a one-man show so that he can get a Tony Award.

== Cultural references ==
In the beginning of this episode, Liz asks where Frank Rossitano (Judah Friedlander) is, as he is one of her staff writers and she wants him to write some Winter Olympics sketches. This results in Liz breaking the fourth wall—a term used when a character in a television show, film or on stage directly addresses the audience—where she mouths speech that is unintelligible, while her voice is heard saying "Lindsey Vonn!" who won the "gold medal for skiing!"

Kenneth references the 1987 thriller film Fatal Attraction after encouraging Liz to meet with her "future husband" and deeming it a romantic situation, saying "Just like that movie I only saw the first 10 minutes of, Fatal Attraction!". The movie is about a married man who has a weekend affair with a woman who refuses to end the affair as she becomes obsessed with him. Kenneth later has a dream that seems to be influenced by the movie The Shining, telling Jenna, "Late at night these two little twin girls told me they wanted to play with me forever." He also references the story of Lot and his daughters from the Bible, and a vignette from Saved by the Bell involving characters Samuel "Screech" Powers and Lisa Turtle.

Wondering why he has not seen any of his GE colleagues, Jack's office assistant Jonathan (Maulik Pancholy) suggests that maybe they are the last people on Earth, as he references the 2007 film I Am Legend, "You're Will Smith and I'm the dog!" In I Am Legend, Will Smith's character is the last healthy human in New York City and lives with his dog. In order to figure out what is going on, Jonathan does investigative work and downloads Don Geiss's schedule while self-narrating to the theme music of Mission Impossible (1996). After Kenneth convinces her to call her "future husband", Liz, who speaks in a Jamaican accent as Dr. Kaplan's dental assistants are Jamaican women, tells the man he needs to come into Dr. Kaplan's office for some work, and Liz ends the call with "Cool Runnings, man! Bobsled!" This is a reference to the comedy movie Cool Runnings (1993) in which the Jamaica national bobsled team made their debut in the 1988 Winter Olympics. In another scene, Liz's ringtone is the song "Fuck the Pain Away" by Canadian electronic musician Peaches.

While giving elocution lessons to Tracy, Jenna quotes the song "I Am So Proud" from Gilbert and Sullivan's The Mikado when she asks him to repeat the phrase, "To sit in solemn silence in a dull, dark dock/Awaiting the sensation of a short, sharp shock."

== Reception ==
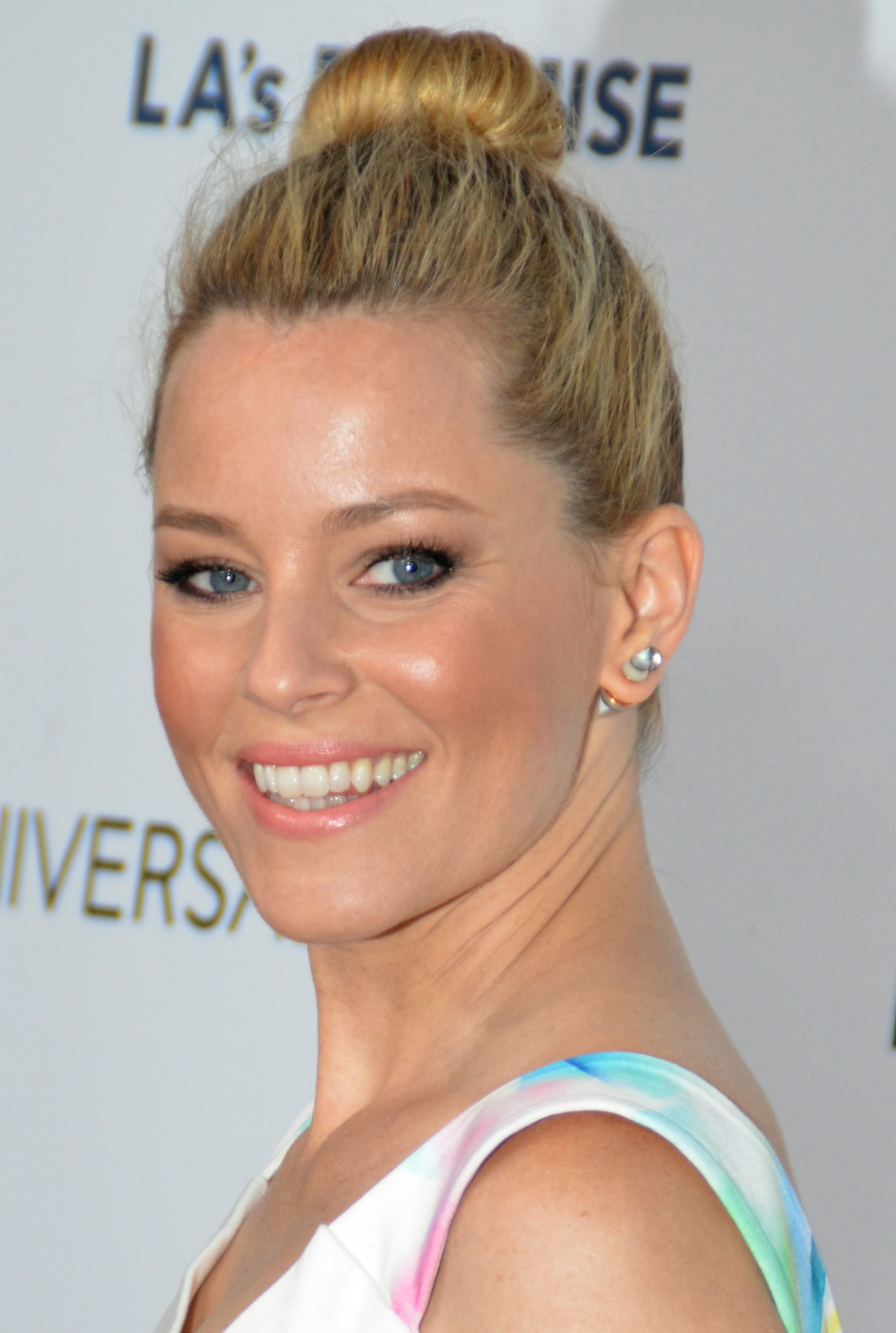
Robert Canning of IGN enjoyed the performance of Elizabeth Banks (pictured) as Avery Jessup in this episode.

In its original American broadcast, "Future Husband" was watched by 5.894 million households, according to the Nielsen ratings system. It received a 2.9 rating/8 share among viewers in the 18–49 demographic, meaning that 2.9 percent of all people in that group, and 8 percent of all people from that group watching television at the time, watched the episode. During its original broadcast, "Future Husband" ranked fourth in its 9:30 p.m. slot, behind CBS's crime drama CSI: Crime Scene Investigation, ABC's medical series Grey's Anatomy, and Fox's reality show Kitchen Nightmares.

Leonard Pierce of The A.V. Club was not positive in his review, describing "Future Husband" as the "laziest" episode of the fourth season. Nonetheless, Pierce responded favorably to Tracy's one-man show, calling it the "shortest and best of the plots" and "even manages to get a laugh out of that old 'I'd watch him reading the phone book' chestnut." Sean Gandert for Paste magazine said in his recap that part of this episode was disappointing, writing that the main plot was not "too awful, [it was] just comparatively dull." Though, he was positive towards the show's interpretation of the NBC and Kabletown storyline, saying it was a nice "little riff" on the actual merger between NBC and Comcast. Gandert was appreciative to Elizabeth Banks' small part, and hoped to see her in future episodes. Entertainment Weekly contributor Margaret Lyons opined it was a "strange" episode of 30 Rock, and concluded "It's not that 'Future Husband' was radically terrible or anything, but wow, that episode just did not click into place." Bob Sassone of TV Squad did not enjoy Jenna's involvement in Tracy's story, and that overall he did not find their antics "too funny". Nonetheless, Sassone enjoyed Brian Williams' cameo.

IGN contributor Robert Canning wrote that the NBC/Comcast reference here "wasn't exactly a well of laughs, but Baldwin's Donaghy kept the story entertaining enough to want to follow it." He enjoyed Banks' appearance, noting that her standout moment came when Avery and Jack argued over the direction of NBC "and for that brief moment Banks stole the show from Baldwin." In conclusion, Canning gave it an 8 out of 10 rating. James Poniewozik of Time magazine said that the main story "played more like a subplot even though it gave the episode its title". He added that there were some fine moments, and that overall Liz and Jack's plots "have the potential to give the show some interesting forward movement". Los Angeles Times contributor Meredith Blake felt that Michael Sheen was "underused" in his role, and observed that Jack and Avery's relationship showcased here seemed "remarkably convincing." Television columnist Alan Sepinwall for The Star-Ledger wrote that the episode's storytelling was "better than it's been in recent weeks", however, was not complimentary towards Liz meeting Sheen's Wesley, as he felt that their plot fell flat.
