= Triggered (film) =

- Film poster
- Directed by: Alastair Orr
- Written by: Alastair Orr; David D. Jones
- Produced by: Chwaitya Dhulane; Ariye Mahdeb
- Starring: Reine Swart; Liesl Ahlers; Russell Crous; Steven John Ward; Cameron Scott; Craig Urbani; Sean Cameron Michael
- Cinematography: Brendan Barnes
- Edited by: Alastair Orr
- Music by: Andries Smit; Jason van Wyk
- Production companies: Polanomode Media; The First Order
- Distributed by: Samuel Goldwyn Films
- Release dates: 6 November 2020 (United States); 10 January 2021 (South Africa)
- Running time: 94 minutes
- Country: South Africa
- Language: English

Triggered is a South African horror-comedy film co-written and directed by Alastair Orr. The film stars Reine Swart, Liesl Ahlers, Russell Crous, Steven John Ward, Cameron Scott with Craig Urbani and Sean Cameron Michael. As part of an ensemble of nine friends who find themselves strapped to suicide bomb vests by a former teacher, forcing the group to kill each other until there is one left.

== Plot ==
A group of former high school friends reunite for a camping trip. The group includes valedictorian Rian and her boyfriend PJ, a rock drummer; popular Ezra, wallflower Erin, couple Shay and Bobby, best friends Amber and Cici, and the brooding Kato. As the group attempts to turn in for the night, they are knocked out by gas placed by a mysterious figure and Erin, who discovers the gas, is knocked out. The nine awaken and find themselves strapped to suicide bomb vests.

The man responsible is Mr. Peterson, the group's former science teacher. He confronts the group, as he holds them responsible for the death of his son Caleb, who died of a drug overdose at a party. He sets off various timers on each student's vest and proceeds to kill himself in front of the group. When they find a battered Bobby, who had been separated from the group, it's revealed that he helped Mr. Peterson and was responsible for the group going to the woods. Bobby apologizes, explaining that he was blackmailed by Peterson, but it is too late and the vest explodes, killing him.

After Bobby, PJ has the lowest time and begs Rian to help. However, when he is startled by Shay, he accidentally kills her with a high impact blow to the head with his flashlight. He and Rian discover Shay's time has been added to PJ's vest, thus giving him the highest time. Rian tells the group about what had happened and that he got the time because of "proximity sensors". When Cici has the next lowest score, she goes insane and goes after the group. When Cici learns Amber had been sleeping with Ezra thanks to Kato telling her, Amber defends herself and kills her best friend. Kato convinces Amber to ally with him to kill the others so they can be the last ones standing.

Ezra convinces Erin to team up with him and the two find a man bloodied and tied up in the forest. Erin recognizes him as Detective Miller, Rian's father. Miller tells the two that Peterson forced him to reopen Caleb's case and had strapped him to a vest as well. As he is mortally wounded, Ezra kills Miller, but since Erin is the closest one, she gets his time. Ezra did it as the first selfless act he's done as he has had a reputation as a selfish playboy type. As Erin looks for Rian, Kato, now gone insane, kills Ezra as revenge for Amber. Erin finds Rian and tells her about her father's ordeal.

Meanwhile, Kato shoots PJ in the head and then betrays Amber for sleeping with Ezra and chops her repeatedly with an axe. When Rian attempts to turn the vest off, it leads to a sudden death situation between her, Erin, and Kato. Rian then is ready to kill Erin but breaks down and confesses that she is the one who killed Caleb. She admits to slipping ecstasy given to her by Kato at Ezra's party five years ago because he had a higher GPA than her and she was desperate to be valedictorian. She only meant to give him a small dose but gave him too much. She even convinced her father to cover it up. Kato, upon hearing the confession, sneak attacks and kills Rian. However, Rian falls in Erin's arms and thus, she gets the time, which angers Kato.

Kato taunts Erin, who has always been the quiet one. However, Erin gains the confidence she desperately needed and incapacitates Kato, who gives his final words as his timer goes off and explodes. Erin’s vest glows, revealing a message that reads: "All your friends are dead! Have a nice life!"

A mid-credit scene shows Erin escaping to the road and flagging down a passing car. However, he sees her gun and drives away. Erin screams, and then slowly begins to smile.

== Cast ==
- Liesl Ahlers as Erin Coleman, a wallflower whose boyfriend, Caleb Peterson, was accidentally killed at a party due to drugs given to Rian by Kato at a party Ezra hosted in high school.
- Reine Swart as Rian Miller, a former high school valedictorian who was graduating from M.I.T. and is the girlfriend of rock drummer PJ.
- Russell Crous as Kato, a former drug dealer who is the boyfriend of Amber.
- Cameron Scott as PJ, the drummer of a local rock band called "Cock Tumor", who is the boyfriend of Rian.
- Steven John Ward as Ezra, who held the house party where Caleb Peterson had died after accidentally ingesting too much Ectasty. He is the boyfriend of Cici but had been fooling around with Amber.
- Suraya Rose dos Santos as Shay, Bobby's on-off girlfriend with a wild side when it comes to her relationship.
- Paige Bonnin as Amber, who is best friends with Cici and is the girlfriend of Kato. She secretly had been sleeping with Ezra, Cici's boyfriend.
- Kayla Privett as Cici, Ezra's girlfriend who has never trusted him and later learns that her best friend Amber, had been sleeping with him.
- Michael Lawrence Potter as Bobby, Shay's on-off boyfriend who is bisexual and was blackmailed by Mr. Peterson to lure his friends to the campsite. The film marked Potter's feature film debut.
- Sean Cameron Michael as Mr. Peterson, the friends' former high school science teacher who knocked them out and forced them to wear suicide bomb vests. He seeks revenge for the death of his son Caleb, which in turned caused his wife to kill herself as well.
- Craig Urbani as Detective Miller, Rian's father who helped Rian cover up Caleb's death and was kidnapped by Peterson.

== Production ==
Director Alastair Orr cited Kinji Fukusaku's Battle Royale, Kevin Smith, Greg McLean, and James Wan's Saw as influences for making the film.

The film was shot in the summer of 2019 at Appelsbosch Farm in Swellendam, South Africa. Filming took place only at night as the film is set throughout the course of one night. During the days, the core cast of the nine friends would bond over drinks and play Laser Tag as they had never worked with each other before. Reine Swart said that the idea of them bonding was that of Cameron Scott, who is the youngest cast member (at age 24 at the time) and to this day, the cast remains friends.

In a 2023 interview, Liesl Ahlers admits that the smile she gives at the end wasn't meant to mean anything. It was the final day of a tumultuous night shoot and the smile represented her relief that it had finally ended. Yet, she did admit, she likes the fan theories behind the smile. In the same interview, she revealed that the day the special effects crew were gathering the fake body parts of Michael Potter's Bobby post-explosion, his fake head was never found.

== Reception ==
On Rotten Tomatoes, the film has an approval rating of 50% based on 28 reviews, with an average rating of 5.2/10. The website's critics consensus reads: "Triggered's combustible premise largely fizzles out thanks to thinly written characters and a story that's heavier on fast paced violence than actual ideas." According to Metacritic, which sampled the opinions of five critics and calculated a score of 48 out of 100, the film received "mixed or average reviews".

Ben Kenigsberg of the New York Times gave the film three stars, stating "its relentlessness, and the gusto with which it embraces its mandate to make a mess, is tough to resist.". Brian Tallerico of RogerEbert.com gave it 2.5 stars. Mark Hanson of Slant Magazine rated it 1.5 stars. Calling the characters "mostly bland", Frank Sheck of The Hollywood Reporter said of the film: "Once the outlandish premise is established, there's little to enjoy in the increasing body count". Though critical of the film's acting and referring to it as "a D-rated splatter film," The Alternative included Triggered in "The Alt's Favorite Horror Films" list, stating "It’s so bad it’s good, and I’m obsessed with it. I need you to be obsessed with it too."
