= House on Willow Street =

- Directed by: Alastair Orr
- Screenplay by: Jonathan Jordaan; Alastair Orr
- Story by: Kate Blackman
- Produced by: Zino Ventura; Mirell Lerm Ventura; Alastair Orr
- Starring: Sharni Vinson; Carlyn Burchell; Steven John Ward; Zino Ventura; Gustav Gerderner
- Cinematography: Brendan Barnes
- Edited by: Alastair Orr
- Music by: Andries Smit
- Production companies: Darkside; Fat Cigar Productions
- Release date: 26 August 2016 (London FrightFest Film Festival)
- Running time: 86 minutes
- Country: South Africa
- Language: English

House on Willow Street (also known as From a House on Willow Street) is a 2016 South African supernatural horror film written by Jonathan Jordaan and Alistair Orr and directed by Orr. It stars Sharni Vinson, Steven Ward, Zino Ventura, and Gustav Gerderner as kidnappers who take a young girl, played by Carlyn Burchell. It premiered at the London FrightFest Film Festival.

== Plot ==
Hazel, her boyfriend Ade, Ade's cousin James, and Mark plot to kidnap diamond heiress Katherine within the next six weeks. The expedited time frame worries Mark, who believes it may cause them to make mistakes. Hazel and Ade are adamant about the time frame, as Ade will soon go on trial for the accidental death of his brother George. They stress the importance of both the timing and the need for a flawless execution. Left with no other option, Mark agrees. Six weeks later, the four break into Katherine's house, encountering no resistance and finding the alarm already deactivated. After grabbing Katherine, they return to their headquarters in an abandoned warehouse and chain up Katherine. They are surprised by her dirty and sickly appearance but continue with their plan regardless.

Katherine warns them to let her go free and initially refuses to play along in making a ransom video. Hazel convinces her by promising the ordeal will end faster if she cooperates. However, the kidnappers can not contact her parents to make their demands. Hazel sends Ade and James back to Katherine's house to investigate. Less distracted, they realise the house is full of decaying food and smells horrible. James finds two dead, mutilated priests in the cellar, and Ade realises that Katherine's parents have been gruesomely murdered. Both are haunted by apparitions from their past. Worried they will be blamed for the murders, they flee the house after grabbing videotapes from the cellar. On the way back, Ade swerves to miss an apparition of George, and James is assaulted by his dead mother.

Back at the warehouse, Hazel and Mark are also haunted. Hazel sees her own dead mother, and Mark sees his dead daughter Sarah. James' condition steadily deteriorates, and the others leave him in a room to rest while they watch the videotapes. The first videotape is by Katherine and details the history of her house and its many unexplained deaths, including that of Hazel's mother. The others are annoyed that Hazel kept this detail quiet, but they continue watching. On the next videotape, a priest says a demon that feeds on grief is responsible for the deaths and has subsequently possessed Katherine. The demon has chosen this house because it is the furthest point in the world from a holy relic kept in the Vatican. Panicked by the demon's growing power, the priests attempt to immolate Katherine, but she kills everyone in the house.

Disturbed by the videotapes, Hazel, Ade, and Mark confront Katherine, who, as the demon, reveals that she only needs to possess two more people to be set free from hell. James, infected by his mother's apparition, attempts to infect the others. Katherine appeals to Mark, telling him that if he betrays Hazel and Ade, she will spare his soul and allow him to be with Sarah again. Mark frees Katherine from her chains and delivers the others to her. After hearing their anguished cries, he sacrifices himself to give them time to escape and becomes infected. Haunted by guilt, Ade attempts to reason with George's apparition, to no avail. To prevent himself from becoming the final possession the demon needs, Ade kills himself.

The apparition of Hazel's mom helps guide her to freedom. The possessed Katherine, Mark, and James chase Hazel, who retreats to Ade's crashed van. There, they nearly infect her, but she fights them off. Hazel recovers a lighter from the van and traps Katherine in the chains they used for the kidnapping. As Katherine works to free herself, Hazel's mom appears and destroys Mark and James. Remembering the priests wanted to immolate Katherine to stop the demon, Hazel incapacitates Katherine, douses her in gasoline, and sets the van afire. Hazel flees the scene as sirens approach.

== Cast ==
- Sharni Vinson as Hazel
- Carlyn Burchell as Katherine
- Steven John Ward as Ade
- Zino Ventura as Mark
- Gustav Gerderner as James
- Dimitri Bailanis as George
- Zelmia Bezuidenhout as Hazel's mom
- Nicole de Klerk as Sarah

== Release ==
House on Willow Street premiered at the London FrightFest Film Festival on 26 August 2016. IFC Midnight released it in the United States on 24 March 2017, and Scream Factory released it on DVD and Blu-ray on 1 August 2017.

== Reception ==
Rotten Tomatoes, a review aggregator, reports that 55% of 11 surveyed critics gave the film a positive review; the average rating is 4.8/10. Frank Scheck of The Hollywood Reporter wrote, "What the repetitive film lacks in narrative drive and compelling dialogue it makes up for in technical prowess", praising Orr's direction and Vinson's acting. John Noonan of Filmink called it "a sharp, succinct dip into horror". In rating it 2.5/5 stars, Gareth Jones of Dread Central wrote that the film "does manage to inject some new life into the premise" but throws too many tedious, cheap scares at the viewer. Benedict Seal of Bloody Disgusting wrote that it "has an interesting idea at its core, but kind of drops the bomb with an over-zealous barrage of samey jump scares." Writing for Screen Anarchy, Andrew Mack said the film has "a lot to like" but "becomes an increasingly frustrating and predictable experience". Reviewing the film on DVD, Richard Whittaker of The Austin Chronicle wrote that although House on Willow Street is unsubtle, it is "so gung-ho in its action/horror fusion that it's hard to dislike".
