= Detour (2016 film) =

2016 British thriller film

- Theatrical release poster
- Directed by: Christopher Smith
- Written by: Christopher Smith
- Produced by: Julie Baines; Phil Hunt; Stephen Kelliher; Jason Newmark; Compton Ross
- Starring: Tye Sheridan; Stephen Moyer; Emory Cohen; Bel Powley; John Lynch; Gbenga Akinnagbe; Reine Swart
- Cinematography: Christopher Ross
- Edited by: Kristina Hetherington
- Music by: Pablo Clements; James Griffith; TOYDRUM
- Production companies: Head Gear Films; Bankside Films; Kreo Films FZ; Dan Films; Newscope Films; Metrol Technology
- Distributed by: Magnet Releasing
- Release dates: 16 April 2016 (Tribeca Film Festival); 20 January 2017 (United States)
- Running time: 96 minutes
- Countries: United Kingdom; South Africa
- Language: English
- Box office: $7,600

Detour is a 2016 British thriller film written and directed by Christopher Smith. The film stars Tye Sheridan, Stephen Moyer, Emory Cohen, Bel Powley, John Lynch, Gbenga Akinnagbe and Reine Swart. The film was released in the United States on 20 January 2017 by Magnet Releasing.

== Plot ==
Young law student Harper blames his powerful stepfather Vincent for causing the car accident that put his mother in a coma. One evening in a bar he meets and has a drink with the professional criminal Johnny Ray, who agrees to kill Vincent for $20,000. Johnny Ray and his girlfriend Cherry arrive the next morning to take Harper to Vegas to carry out the murder. Harper eventually realizes that he made a grave mistake after learning that he cannot take back the deal he made with Johnny. The trip to Las Vegas becomes a battle of wits and determination between Johnny Ray, who has debts to pay along the way, and Harper, who seeks to conceal his own crimes and to escape from Johnny Ray with Cherry.

== Cast ==
- Tye Sheridan as Harper
- Stephen Moyer as Vincent
- Emory Cohen as Johnny Ray
- Bel Powley as Cherry
- John Lynch as Frank
- Jared Abrahamson as Paul
- Gbenga Akinnagbe as Michael
- Reine Swart as Claire Wiseman

== Release ==
The film premiered at the Tribeca Film Festival on 16 April 2016. On 14 May 2016, Magnet Releasing acquired distribution rights to the film, which it released in the United States on 20 January 2017.

== Response ==
=== Box office ===
Detour grossed $1,788 in the United States and Canada and $5,812 in other territories for a worldwide total of $7,600, plus $374,237 with home video sales.

=== Critical reception ===
As of July 2020, on review aggregator website Rotten Tomatoes, the film holds an approval rating of 63% based on 32 reviews, with an average rating of 6/10. On Metacritic, the film holds a rating of 46 out of 100, based on 7 critics, indicating "mixed or average reviews".
