= The Lullaby (2017 film) =

2018 South African horror film

- Directed by: Darrell Roodt
- Written by: Tarryn-Tanille Prinsloo
- Story by: Samuel Frauenstein; Darrell Roodt
- Produced by: Samuel Frauenstein; Andre Frauenstein Snr
- Starring: Reine Swart; Thandi Puren; Brandon Auret; Deànré Reiners; Dorothy Ann Gould
- Cinematography: Justus de Jager
- Edited by: Leon Gerber
- Music by: Alun Richards
- Production companies: Cut & Paste Generation; Kwazi Mojo Media; Phoenix Films
- Distributed by: Crystal Brook Distribution
- Release date: 25 October 2017 (South African Horrorfest)
- Running time: 86 minutes
- Country: South Africa
- Language: English
- Box office: $242,997

The Lullaby (also known as Siembamba) is a 2017 South African horror film directed by Darrell Roodt and co-produced by Samuel Frauenstein and Andre Frauenstein Snr. The film stars Reine Swart with Thandi Puren, Brandon Auret, Deànré Reiners, and Dorothy Ann Gould in supporting roles. The film tells the story of 19-year-old mom, Chloe van Heerden, who struggled to dealing with her super critical mother, Ruby, where she finally ends in a paranoia that sends Chloe into a dark depression. This is the first purely South African film production to release theatrically in the USA. Rotten Tomatoes ranked the film as the 17th Best Horror Movie for 2018.

The film was shot in and around Pretoria, Gauteng, South Africa. It premiered at the 2017 South African Horrorfest Film Festival.

== Reception ==
The film made its world premier with red carpet on 1 March 2018 at the Laemmle Fine Arts Theatre in Beverly Hills and also screened on 18 May 2018 in Turkey as well as 150 cinemas in the USA, then in Japan, Canada, Vietnam and the United Arab Emirates. The film received mixed reviews from critics. The film was later nominated in eight categories at the Africa Movie Academy Awards 2018 took place on 22 September 2018 in Kigali, Rwanda: Best achievement in make-up, Best achievement in soundtrack, Best achievement in visual effects, Best achievement in cinematography, Best achievement in editing, Best actress in a leading role, Best director and Best Feature Film.

It was also nominated for two SAFTA awards. In the meantime, the script of the film is preserved at the Academy of Motion Picture Arts and Sciences Margaret Herrick Library which is used for study purposes.

== Cast ==
- Reine Swart as Chloe van Heerden
- Thandi Puren as Ruby van Heerden
- Brandon Auret as Dr. Timothy Reed
- Deànré Reiners as Adam Hess
- Dorothy Ann Gould as Midwife
- Shayla-Rae McFarlane as Young Chloe
- Eckardt Spies as Baby Liam
- Amjoné Spies as Baby Liam
- Samuel Frauenstein as Truck driver
- Briony Horwitz as Nurse 1
- Anne-Marie Ellis as Nurse 2
- Lara de Villiers as Boer mother
- Dayna McFarlane as Waiter
