= Liesl Ahlers =

South African actress (born 1991)

- Born: Liesl Ahlers; 29 May 1991 (age 35); Pretoria, South Africa
- Education: Hoërskool Die Wilgers, Pretoria; Vancouver Academy of Dramatic Arts; University of South Africa
- Occupations: Actress; director; singer; songwriter; writer; martial artist
- Years active: 2011–present
- Height: 1.57 m (5 ft 2 in)
- Website: http://www.lieslahlers.com

Liesl Ahlers (born 29 May 1991) is a South African actress, director, singer, songwriter, and martial artist. She is best known for the roles in the films Friend Request, Daylight and Triggered.

== Personal life ==
Liesl was born on 29 May 1991 in Pretoria, South Africa. Liesl matriculated from Hoërskool Die Wilgers in Pretoria. She studied Acting for Film & TV in Canada at the Vancouver Academy of Dramatic Arts (VADA). She later obtained her Honors degree in Psychology at the University of South Africa (Cum Laude).

Liesl is fluent in both Afrikaans and English.

== Career ==
After returning to South Africa in 2011, she joined the cast for the third season of South Africa popular television series Sokhulu & Partners and played the role "Zelda". Then she acted opposite William Hurt in the television movie The Challenger Disaster telecast on BBC Two in 2013.

In 2016, she played the role "Marina Mills" in the German supernatural film Friend Request directed by Simon Verhoeven. She later received an award in Moscow for that role. In 2020, Liesl acted in the film Triggered directed by Alastair Orr, with the role of "Erin". Then in 2021, she acted in the horror film The Construct and also performed as a stunt actor.

Beyond acting, she wrote, produced and directed the South African Awareness film Daylight in 2018. The film made a global awareness on orphan children resulting due to the HIV/AIDS epidemic in South Africa. The film later received 11 nominations and 6 wins after making Official Selection at the Realtime International Film Festival 2018 in Lagos, Nigeria. For the film, she was nominated for Best Director, Best Movie By an African Female Director/Producer and Best Supporting Actress.

Apart from acting, Liesl has a Brown Belt in Martial Arts where she has trained in Korean fighting and Self Defense (Hapkido) under Master Vladimir Grachev. She began her journey after she auditioned for the lead role "Sawa" in the live-action adaptation of Kite but lost out to India Eisley due to the inability to do the film's stunts. She dreams to eventually star in an action film that will allow her to showcase her skills along with a sword fight.

Liesl is also a designer, owner and founder of women's clothing "Call A Cab & Take It Slow". She is the founder of "The Squared Shirt Charity Project", established with an aim to empower children who live in poverty in South Africa.

In addition to her acting and fashion designing, Liesl is also a singer and songwriter. She has sung her own songs like "With Stupid", "Blues Baby", and "Crimson" to name a few. Her songwriting credits include "The First Thing", performed by John Niel; "I See You" and "Home", performed by Lee Cole; and "Before", performed by Sarah Bird. "Home" was nominated for Bob Pest Song at the 2020 European Songwriting Awards in Frankfurt, Germany. "Before" received an honorable mention at Songdoor 2020. She plans to release her first album with the alias "LARS".

== Filmography ==
Year	Film	Role	Genre	Ref.
2010	Thysnywerheid	Marike-Marie Thyssen	TV series	
2011	Sokhulu and Partners II	Zelda	TV series	
2012	Rock and Roll	Sarah	Short film	
2013	The Challenger Disaster	Hotel Receptionist	TV movie	
2013	Brunch	Emily	Short film	
2015	Inside Job	Sophie	TV movie	
2016	Friend Request	Marina Mills / Marina Nedifar	Film	
2017	Dealing	Wanda	Short film	
2018	Daylight	Aislinn, Director, Writer, Executive producer,	Short film	
2018	The Defining Moment	Katy Swanepoel, Composer	Short film	
2020	Seafoam	Alex Hart	TV series	
2020	Triggered	Erin Coleman	Film	
2021	Let's Talk Showbiz	Actor	TV series	
2024	Kindness	Director, Producer, Editor	Documentary	
TBD	Sterre Dans	Lisa	Short film	
TBD	The Construct	Rachel Wilcox, Stunt actor	Film	
TBD	Obsession	Christal de Waal	TV series	
