= Jeff Steitzer =

American voice actor

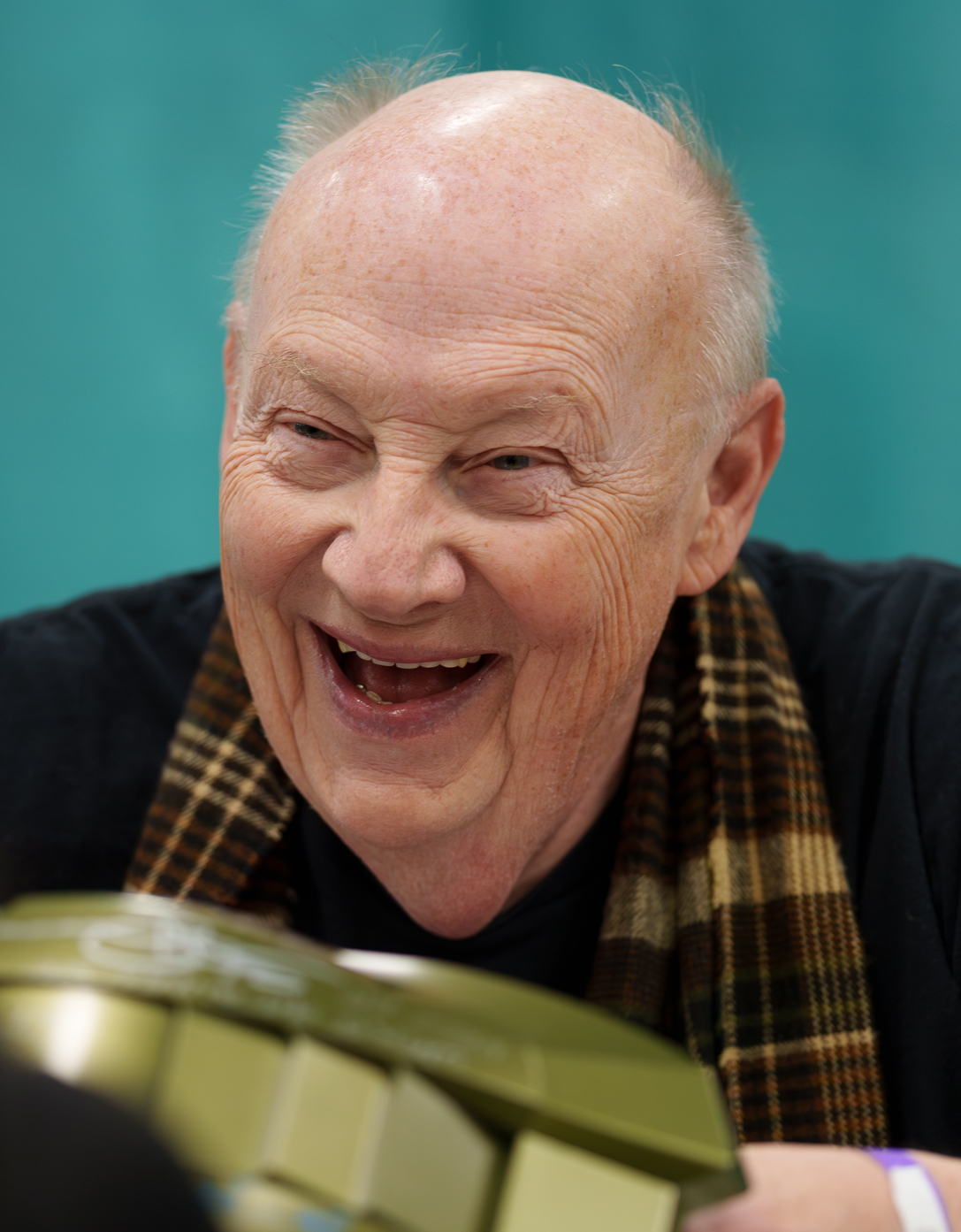
- Steitzer in 2025
- Born: November 28, 1951 (age 74); Deadwood, South Dakota, U.S.
- Occupations: Actor, director

Jeffrey Steitzer (born November 28, 1951) is an American voice actor, stage actor, and director. He is best known for being the voice of the multiplayer announcer in the Halo series.

== Career ==
Jeff Steitzer studied theater at the University of Northern Iowa and graduated in 1975.

Steitzer has done voice acting for multiple video games, and is most known for voicing the multiplayer announcer in the Halo video game series. Initially he auditioned and was told he would play Master Chief, but was given the role of the multiplayer announcer.

In addition to being a voice actor, Steitzer is also a stage actor and director. In 1985, Steitzer became a resident director for ACT Theatre, and became the organization's artistic director in 1988. He remained the artistic director until he resigned in 1994. The theatre was successful during his six-year tenure. He has also directed for other organizations such as the Seattle Shakespeare Company.

He has played numerous roles on stage including Dr. Watson, Ebenezer Scrooge, and Gerald Ford. He played Frank in the premiere of Steven Dietz's play Private Eyes (1996) and Garroway in the premiere of Dietz's play Over the Moon (2003), adapted from The Small Bachelor. He also appeared on Broadway in Mary Poppins (2006) replacing another actor as Admiral Boom and the Bank Chairman, and in Inherit the Wind (2007) as the Mayor. Steitzer has acted on radio in Imagination Theatre radio dramas, and has narrated several audiobooks.

== Filmography ==
=== Television ===
- The Fugitive (2001) – Art Zimmerman (recurring)
- Law & Order: "Fame" (2006) – Earl Woodlief
- 30 Rock: "Don Geiss, America and Hope" (2010) – Priest
- The Cleveland Show: "Another Bad Thanksgiving" (2010)

=== Video games ===
- Pajama Sam 3: You Are What You Eat from Your Head to Your Feet (2000) – General Beetfoot
- The Operative: No One Lives Forever (2000) – Baron Dumas
- Aliens versus Predator 2 (2001) – General Vassili Rykov, Additional Voices
- Halo: Combat Evolved (2001) – Announcer
- Halo 2 (2004) – Announcer
- Grand Theft Auto: Vice City Stories (2006) – The Chief, Peter Bradbury / The Fisherman
- Halo 3 (2007) – Multiplayer Announcer
- Halo 3: ODST (2009) – Firefight Announcer
- Halo: Reach (2010) – Multiplayer Announcer
- Halo 4 (2012) – Multiplayer Announcer
- Halo 5: Guardians (2015) – Multiplayer Announcer
- Halo Wars 2 (2017) – Announcer
- Grand Theft Auto Online: The Doomsday Heist (2017) – Agent ULP / Bernard
- Halo Infinite (2021) – Multiplayer Announcer
- Grand Theft Auto Online: The Criminal Enterprises (2022) – Agent ULP / Bernard
- Splitgate 2 (2025) – Announcer
