= Steven John Ward =

South African actor (born 1990)

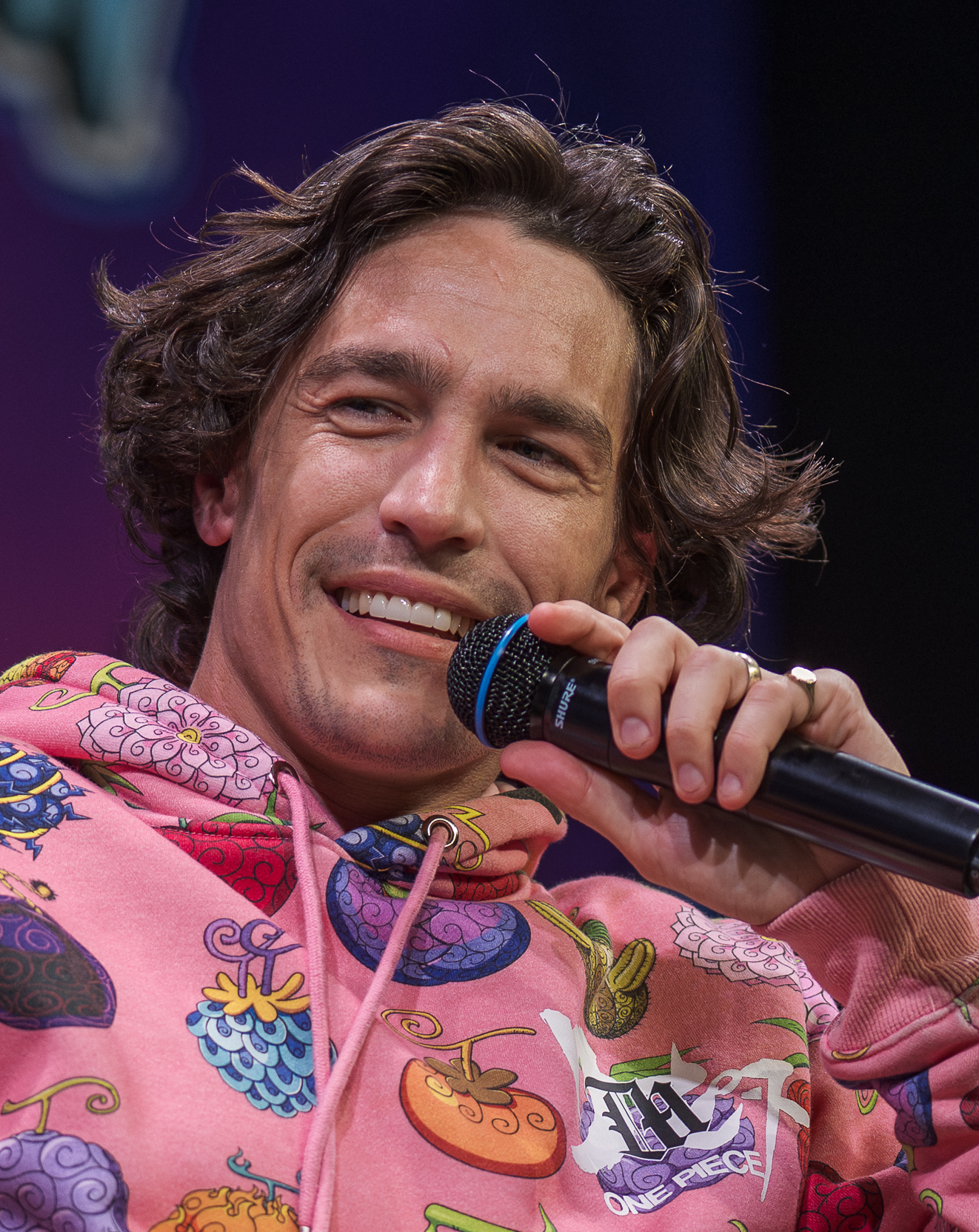
- Ward at GalaxyCon Richmond in 2026
- Born: 2 June 1990 (age 36); Papua New Guinea
- Education: AFDA, The School for the Creative Economy; Uplands College
- Occupations: Actor, model
- Years active: 2009–present
- Children: 2

Steven John Ward (born 2 June 1990) is a South African actor. His most notable roles include Ade in the horror film House on Willow Street (2016), Elton in Queen Sono (2020), Ezra in Triggered (2020), and Dracule Mihawk in Netflix's live adaptation of One Piece (2023).

== Early life ==
Steven John Ward was born in Papua New Guinea and spent several years in Los Angeles before settling in Johannesburg with his family in 2018.

== Filmography ==
=== Film ===
Year	Title	Role	Notes
2016	House on Willow Street	Ade	
2020	Triggered	Ezra	

=== Television ===
Year	Title	Role	Notes
2020	Queen Sono	Elton, Vitali	Episode: "I Am Queen Sono"
2020	Vagrant Queen	Chaz Rali	4 episodes
2020	Inconceivable	Nick Rebeiro	Recurring role
2021	The Day We Didn't Meet	Sam	Television movie
2023–present	One Piece	Dracule Mihawk	4 episodes
2024	Catch Me a Killer	Mark	Main role
