= Black Light Attack! =

- 30 Rock episode
- Episode no.: Season 4 Episode 10
- Directed by: Don Scardino
- Written by: Steve Hely
- Production code: 410
- Original air date: January 14, 2010

Guest appearances
- Dr. Sanjay Gupta as himself; Cheyenne Jackson as Danny

Episode chronology
| ← Previous "Klaus and Greta" | Next → "Winter Madness" |
- 30 Rock season 4

"Black Light Attack!" is the tenth episode of the fourth season of the American television comedy series 30 Rock, and the 68th overall episode of the series. The episode was written by Steve Hely and directed by series producer Don Scardino. It originally aired on NBC in the United States on January 14, 2010. Guest stars in this episode include Dr. Sanjay Gupta and Cheyenne Jackson.

In the episode, TGS with Tracy Jordan head writer Liz Lemon (Tina Fey) and new cast member Danny Baker (Jackson) further their relationship, while their boss Jack Donaghy (Alec Baldwin) becomes jealous and plans to break them apart. Meanwhile, movie star Tracy Jordan (Tracy Morgan) recruits TGS writer Sue Laroche-Van der Hout (Sue Galloway) into his entourage, and Jenna Maroney (Jane Krakowski) auditions for a role on Gossip Girl. This episode was Jackson's third appearance as Danny.

"Black Light Attack!" received generally mixed reception from television critics. According to the Nielsen ratings system, it was watched by 5.014 million households during its original broadcast, and received a 2.3 rating/6 share among viewers in the 18–49 demographic. Its rating constituted a 30 percent drop from the December 2009 episode "Secret Santa". For her performance in this episode, Jane Krakowski received a Primetime Emmy Award nomination in the category for Outstanding Supporting Actress in a Comedy Series.

== Plot ==
During the TGS afterparty, new cast member Danny Baker (Cheyenne Jackson) admits to his boss, Jack Donaghy (Alec Baldwin), that he has been having an office romance but will not disclose the woman's name. While in attendance at a New York Knicks game, Jack asks more about the woman Danny is seeing and Danny reveals details, such as she has never let a man see her feet. This results in Jack's realization that the woman is the show's head writer, Liz Lemon (Tina Fey), and he is displeased.

Meanwhile, actress Jenna Maroney (Jane Krakowski) auditions for a role she believes is for a college freshman on Gossip Girl. At the audition, Jenna learns that she is actually booked to audition for the role of the college freshman's mother. She panics, believing that this is a sign that she is no longer young, and in an attempt to reclaim her youth, begins acting young which causes the TGS writing staff to mock her. At the same time, movie star Tracy Jordan (Tracy Morgan) decides to add a woman to his entourage as a learning experience when he and his wife, Angie (Sherri Shepherd), have a daughter. He brings in the French-Dutch TGS writer Sue Laroche-Van der Hout (Sue Galloway). Tracy later loses his temper with a crew member, thinking that he made a suggestive comment about Sue, causing NBC page Kenneth Parcell (Jack McBrayer) to tell Tracy that he has become paternal towards Sue. Soon after, Sue begins rebelling against him, as Tracy treats her as a child.

During the TGS after party, Danny's body paint—after performing as a robot—had not washed off and could be seen under the black lights at the party. As he knows about Danny and Liz's relationship, Jack later uses a black light on Liz to reveal body paint all over her—transferred from Danny—revealing to her that he knows about their relationship. Jack tells Liz to end the relationship, but she hesitates. Eventually, she tries to break if off with Danny, but when she sees him wearing a CHiPs costume, she changes her mind. Jack confronts Liz on the whereabouts of Danny, as Danny had skipped lunch with him, only for Jack to see Danny's CHiPs badge in her office. He orders her to end the relationship immediately, but Liz refuses, believing Jack is jealous. Simultaneously, Liz urges Jenna to come clean about her real age to the TGS staff, but Jenna balks at the idea. Liz tells Jenna if she tells everyone her real age, she will reveal her "friend Tom... Tom Selleck" her mustache, to which Jenna agrees. Later, Liz walks by the staff with the mustache in her face. Jenna thanks Liz for this, and as a result, Jenna accepts the role of the mother on Gossip Girl.

Knowing that Liz will not break off with Danny, Jack tells Danny he knows about the two. He lies to Danny by telling him he's in love with Liz, hoping that Danny will end it with Liz, which he does. After Sue returns from a night of partying, Tracy tells her that all he wanted to do was to be a father figure to her. Liz enters Tracy's dressing room—with the mustache intact—to take Sue back to the writers' room, as Liz had been looking for her. At the end, Tracy wonders if he can go through his experience with Sue if he has a daughter, to which Kenneth says he thinks he can.

== Production ==
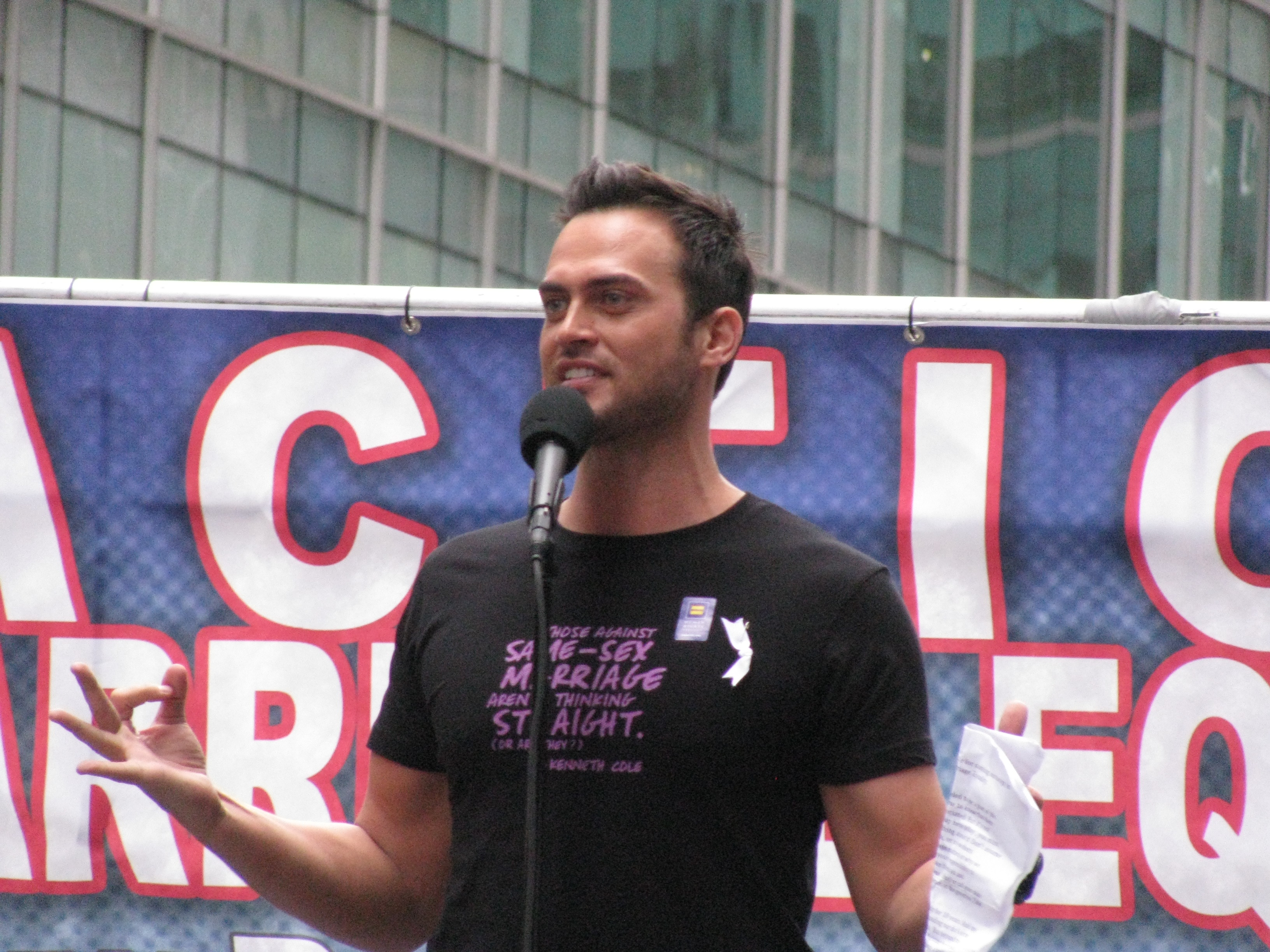
Cheyenne Jackson made his third appearance as Danny Baker in this episode.

"Black Light Attack!" was written by Steve Hely and directed by series producer Don Scardino. This was Hely's first writing credit and Scardino's twenty-third episode directed. It originally aired in the United States on January 14, 2010, on NBC as the tenth episode of the show's fourth season and the 68th overall episode of the series.

"Black Light Attack!" was filmed on November 9 and November 13, 2009. In the scene in which Jenna plays the dying mother on Gossip Girl, the scenery is that used for the Waldorf residence in Gossip Girl. The two series are shot next to each other at Silvercup Studios in Queens, New York. In September 2008, it was reported that actresses Blake Lively and Leighton Meester, who star on Gossip Girl, were set to guest star on 30 Rock, but the appearances fell through.

Dr. Sanjay Gupta guest starred as himself in "Black Light Attack!"; Liz is at home and watches Dr. Gupta on CNN as he expounds about the rise in female libido before menopause, referred to as the "Dirty 30s". This was actor Cheyenne Jackson's third appearance as Danny on 30 Rock. He made his debut in the November 12, 2009, episode "The Problem Solvers", and would later guest star on "Secret Santa". Series' creator, executive producer and lead actress Tina Fey had seen Jackson in the Broadway musicals Xanadu and Damn Yankees, the latter that starred Jane Krakowski, who plays Jenna on the show. According to Jackson in a November 2009 interview, Fey set up a meeting to interest him in a role on the program. In an interview with the Los Angeles Times, it was revealed that it was Krakowski who brought Jackson to the attention of the 30 Rock producers. While at the Knicks game, Danny reveals details to Jack, about the woman he is seeing, such as "She never takes off her shoes ... Even though the reason is she's never let a man see her feet", which is a real life trait of Fey's and her character.

== Reception ==
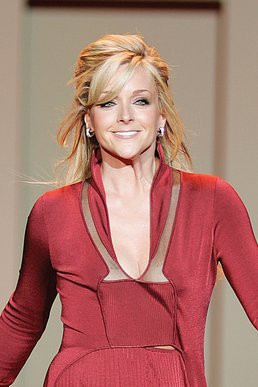
Jane Krakowski received an Emmy nomination for Outstanding Supporting Actress in a Comedy Series for her performance in this episode.

In its original American broadcast, "Black Light Attack!" was watched by 5.014 million households, according to the Nielsen ratings system. It received a 2.3 rating/6 share among viewers in the 18–49 demographic, that is 2.3 percent of all people in that group, and 6 percent of all people from that group watching television at the time, watched the episode. This was a decrease from the previous episode, "Klaus and Greta", that aired the same day of the week, which was watched by 5.122 million American viewers. The episode's rating constituted a 30 percent drop from the December 10, 2009, airing of the 30 Rock episode, "Secret Santa", to a season low 2.3 rating. Nonetheless, "Black Light Attack!" was the third most viewed episode on the NBC network that week. Jane Krakowski received a Primetime Emmy Award nomination for Outstanding Supporting Actress in a Comedy Series at the 62nd Primetime Emmy Awards for her work in this episode, but lost it to actress Jane Lynch.

The episode received generally mixed reviews. IGN contributor Robert Canning felt that the episode "didn't have the same comedic appeal" as "Klaus and Greta", but did say there were "some funny moments to be sure", but overall the episode lacked. He commented that the main plot had its faults, but that the weak link in the story was Cheyenne Jackson's Danny. He wrote that the Sue character had been great in the past, but that her "expanded role" in this episode was less successful. In conclusion, Canning gave the episode a 7.5 out of 10 rating. The A.V. Club's Emily VanDerWerff wrote that "Black Light Attack!" was "dead in spots. I mean, I laughed out loud a number of times, but not nearly as much". She noted she liked Liz and Jack battling over Danny, but "something about it never landed in the way it should have", and opined that the show did not know what to do with Jackson. Overall, she gave the episode a B rating. Sean Gandert for Paste felt that the Liz, Jack, and Danny plot was less interesting "and in general pretty meh." He noted that "Black Light Attack!" was "a big let-down" after the airing of "Klaus and Greta". Leonard Pierce for The A.V. Club called the episode uneven.

Time contributor James Poniewozik wrote that "Black Light Attack!" presented the balance 30 Rock "has reached with Liz Lemon's character, allowing her to be simultaneously nerdy/awkward ... and strong ... Throw in a steady stream of solid throwaway jokes ... and you had a worthy toofer." Nick Catucci for New York magazine enjoyed the episode, particularly Jenna's line "Would a mother be going on a sex tour of Vietnam?", after telling Liz about her booked role as a mother on Gossip Girl, as a "classic Jenna line, more absurd than hilarious", and that the character's rendition of "Forever Young" was a highlight. Television columnist Alan Sepinwall of The Star-Ledger opined that this episode "made the best use yet of Cheyenne Jackson's Danny", and that he for once enjoyed "Jenna's narcissism and self-delusion" subplot, and her "late attempt" to seem young. Bob Sassone of AOL's TV Squad enjoyed "Black Light Attack!", though, his only complain was that 30 Rock did not focus more on the fictional show TGS, and said he would "like to get back to more of that." Entertainment Weekly’s Margaret Lyons remarked that this episode and "Klaus and Greta" were terrific, and what stood out from both airings "was how much serialized plot[s] these two eps covered ... For a show that's usually so episodic, it was an interesting—totally successful—change of pace."
