= GLAAD Media Award for Outstanding Individual Episode =

Annual media award

- Awarded for: Outstanding Individual Episode
- Country: United States
- Presented by: GLAAD
- Currently held by: Dolly Parton's Heartstrings, “Two Doors Down" (2020)
- Website: glaad.org

The GLAAD Media Award for Outstanding Individual Episode was one of the annual GLAAD Media Awards which, from 1998 to 2020, was offered to the best LGBT-related episode of a television series without a regular LGBT character. It was awarded jointly to multiple recipients twice, in 2006 and 2012.

== Winners and nominations ==
=== 1990s ===
Year	Program	Episode	Network
1998
1998	The Simpsons	"Homer's Phobia"	Fox
1998	HBO Comedy Half-Hour	"Drop Dead Gorgeous (A Tragicomedy): The Power of HIV-Positive Thinking"	HBO
1998	The Practice	"Civil Rights"	ABC
1998	South Park	"Big Gay Al's Big Gay Boat Ride"	Comedy Central
1998	Xena: Warrior Princess	"Here She Comes, Miss Amphipolis"	Syndicated
1999
1999	Tracey Takes On...	"Religion"	HBO
1999	ER	"Stuck on You"	NBC
1999	That '70s Show	"Eric's Buddy"	Fox
1999	Welcome to Paradox	"Options"	Sci-Fi

=== 2000s ===
Year	Program	Episode	Network
2000
2000	Popular	"Wild Wild Mess"	The WB
2000	Any Day Now	"Family Is Family"	Lifetime
2000	Happily Ever After: Fairy Tales for Every Child	"The Sissy Duckling"	HBO
2000	L.A. Doctors	"Been There, Done That"	CBS
2000	Party of Five	"I'll Show You Mine"	Fox
2001
2001	Ed	"The Whole Truth"	NBC
2001	Chicago Hope	"Boys Will Be Girls"	CBS
2001	Family Law	"Are You My Father?"	CBS
2001	Freaks and Geeks	"The Little Things"	NBC
2001	Gideon's Crossing	"Freak Show"	ABC
2002
2002	Resurrection Blvd.	"Saliendo"	Showtime
2002	Family Law	"Gay Divorcee"	CBS
2002	The Guardian	"The Men from the Boys"	CBS
2002	Judging Amy	"Between the Wanting and the Getting"	CBS
2002	Law & Order	"Phobia"	NBC
2003
2003	Resurrection Blvd.	"Pararse"	Showtime
2003	Crossing Jordan	"Scared Straight"	NBC
2003	George Lopez	"Guess Who's Coming to Dinner, Honey?"	ABC
2003	Grounded for Life	"Relax!"	Fox
2003	King of the Hill	"My Own Private Rodeo"	Fox
2004
2004	Boston Public	"Chapter Fifty-Eight"	Fox
2004	The Brotherhood of Poland, New Hampshire	"Sleeping Lions"	CBS
2004	Cold Case	"A Time to Hate"	CBS
2004	Girlfriends	"And Baby Makes Four"	UPN
2004	Law & Order: Special Victims Unit	"Fallacy"	NBC
2005
2005	Jack & Bobby	"The Lost Boys"	The WB
2005	Cold Case	"Daniela"	CBS
2005	Cold Case	"It's Raining Men"	CBS
2005	Strong Medicine	"The Real World Rittenhouse"	Lifetime
2005	Two and a Half Men	"Old Flame with a New Wick"	CBS
2006
2006	Cold Case	"Best Friends"	CBS
2006	My Name Is Earl	"Pilot"	NBC
2006	Law & Order: Special Victims Unit	"Alien"	NBC
2006	What I Like About You	"Someone's in the Kitchen with Daddy"	The WB
2006	Without a Trace	"Transitions"	CBS
2007
2007	Grey's Anatomy	"Where the Boys Are"	ABC
2007	American Dad!	"Lincoln Lover"	Fox
2007	Cold Case	"Forever Blue"	CBS
2007	How I Met Your Mother	"Single Stamina"	CBS
2007	30 Rock	"Blind Date"	NBC
2008
2008	Boston Legal	"Do Tell"	ABC
2008	Cold Case	"Boy Crazy"	CBS
2008	Kyle XY	"Free to Be You and Me"	ABC Family
2008	Law & Order: Special Victims Unit	"Sin"	NBC
2008	My Name Is Earl	"The Gangs of Camden County"	NBC
2009
2009	The New Adventures of Old Christine	"Unidentified Funk"	CBS
2009	ER	"Tandem Repeats"	NBC
2009	Ghost Whisperer	"Slam"	CBS
2009	Life on Mars	"My Maharishi Is Bigger Than Your Maharishi"	ABC
2009	Supernatural	"Ghostfacers"	The CW

=== 2010s ===
Year	Program	Episode	Network
2010
2010	Parks and Recreation	"Pawnee Zoo"	NBC
2010	The Listener	"Lisa Says"	NBC
2010	Private Practice	"Homeward Bound"	ABC
2010	Private Practice	"Wait and See"	ABC
2010	Supernatural	"The Real Ghostbusters"	The CW
2011
2011	30 Rock	"Klaus and Greta"	NBC
2011	Bored to Death	"Escape from the Castle!"	HBO
2011	Drop Dead Diva	"Queen of Mean"	Lifetime
2011	Law & Order	"Innocence"	NBC
2011	Law & Order: UK	"Samaritan"	BBC America
2012
2012	Drop Dead Diva	"Prom"	Lifetime
2012	Hot in Cleveland	"Beards"	TV Land
2012	Are We There Yet?	"The Boy Has Style"	TBS
2012	Man Up!	"Acceptance"	ABC
2012	NCIS	"Recruited"	CBS
2013
2013	Raising Hope	"Don't Ask, Don't Tell Me What to Do"	Fox
2013	Drop Dead Diva	"Family Matters"	Lifetime
2013	Franklin & Bash	"L'affaire Du Coeur"	TNT
2013	The Mentalist	"Ruby Slippers"	CBS
2013	Touch	"Lost and Found"	Fox
2014
2014	Elementary	"Snow Angels"	CBS
2014	Drop Dead Diva	"Secret Lives"	Lifetime
2014	Necessary Roughness	"There's the Door"	USA
2014	The Soul Man	"Bride and Prejudice"	TV Land
2014	Supernatural	"LARP and the Real Girl"	The CW
2015
2015	Drop Dead Diva	"Identity Crisis"	Lifetime
2015	Doctor Who	"Deep Breath"	BBC America
2015	Elementary	"No Lack of Void"	CBS
2015	Good Luck Charlie	"Down a Tree"	Disney Channel
2015	Playing House	"Let's Have a Baby"	USA
2016
2016	Royal Pains	"The Prince of Nucleotides"	USA
2016	Black-ish	"Please Don't Ask, Please Don't Tell"	ABC
2016	The Carmichael Show	"Gender"	NBC
2016	NCIS	"We Build, We Fight"	CBS
2016	NCIS: New Orleans	"Rock-A-Bye-Baby"	CBS
2017
2017	Black Mirror	"San Junipero"	Netflix
2017	Black-ish	"Johnson & Johnson"	ABC
2017	Drunk History	"Bar Fights"	Comedy Central
2017	Easy	"Vegan Cinderella"	Netflix
2017	The Loud House	"Attention Deficit"	Nickelodeon
2018
2018	Master of None	"Thanksgiving"	Netflix
2018	Legion	"Chapter 8"	FX
2018	Pure Genius	"Grace"	CBS
2018	Easy	"Lady Cha Cha"	Netflix
2018	Room 104	"The Missionaries"	HBO
2019
2019	The Guest Book	"Someplace Other Than Here"	TBS
2019	Fresh Off the Boat	"King in the North"	ABC
2019	Fuller House	"Prom"	Netflix
2019	The Good Doctor	"She"	ABC
2019	Law & Order: Special Victims Unit	"Service"	NBC

=== 2020s ===
Year	Program	Episode	Network
2020
2020	Dolly Parton's Heartstrings	"Two Doors Down"	Netflix
2020	Drunk History	"Love"	Comedy Central
2020	Law & Order: SVU	"Murdered at a Bad Address"	NBC
2020	Easy	"Spontaneous Combusion"	Netflix
2020	Watchmen	"This Extraordinary Being"	HBO
