= Audition Day =

- 30 Rock episode
- Episode no.: Season 4 Episode 4
- Directed by: Beth McCarthy-Miller
- Written by: Matt Hubbard
- Production code: 404
- Original air date: November 5, 2009

Guest appearances
- Craig Castaldo as Moonvest; Nick Fondulis as Jayden Michael Tyler; Daniel Genalo as the robot; Marceline Hugot as Kathy Geiss; Gilbert Gottfried as himself (voice); Angela Grovey as a woman that Jenna and Tracy find; Michael Mulheren as a GE executive; David Perlman as a man that Jenna and Tracy find; Martin Scorsese as himself (voice); Christopher Walken as himself (voice); Brian Williams as himself; Lisette Oropesa as Kathy's singing voice

Episode chronology
← Previous "Stone Mountain"	Next → "The Problem Solvers"
- 30 Rock season 4

"Audition Day" is the fourth episode of the fourth season of the American television comedy series 30 Rock, and the 62nd overall episode of the series. The episode was written by supervising producer Matt Hubbard and directed by Beth McCarthy-Miller. It originally aired on NBC in the United States on November 5, 2009. Guest stars in this episode include Craig Castaldo, Nick Fondulis, Daniel Genalo, Marceline Hugot, Angela Grovey, Michael Mulheren, David Perlman, and Brian Williams. There are cameos by Gilbert Gottfried, Martin Scorsese, and Christopher Walken, though, the three did not appear as themselves, but provided their voices in the episode.

In the episode, Liz Lemon (Tina Fey) and Pete Hornberger (Scott Adsit) attempt to rig The Girlie Show with Tracy Jordan (TGS) auditions to guarantee that their preferred candidate (Fondulis) will be selected by their boss, Jack Donaghy (Alec Baldwin). Meanwhile, Jack learns a valuable lesson about humanity when he becomes infected with bedbugs.

"Audition Day" has received generally good reception from television critics. According to the Nielsen Media Research, it was watched by 5.940 million households during its original broadcast, and received a 2.9 rating/7 share among viewers in the 18–49 demographic.

== Plot ==
Writer Liz Lemon (Tina Fey) and producer Pete Hornberger (Scott Adsit) of the show TGS with Tracy Jordan have decided to rig the TGS auditions—in which they are in search of a new cast member on the show—by planning to add bad actors so that their preferred choice, Jayden Michael Tyler (Nick Fondulis), gets hired by their boss, Jack Donaghy (Alec Baldwin). TGS cast member Jenna Maroney (Jane Krakowski) learns that the auditions are taking place and worries that her position on the show will be lessened with the arrival of a new actor. Although Tracy Jordan (Tracy Morgan), the star of the show, reassures Jenna that the two have nothing to worry about, she remains uneasy. Later, Jenna discovers that Liz and Pete want Jayden to be cast, but she pleads with Liz to pull Jayden out of his audition. Jenna hates him for humiliating her after working together on a play, but Liz does not change her mind about Jayden. Jenna eventually figures out what Liz and Pete are scheming, so she and Tracy go out and find people (Angela Grovey and David Perlman) and bring them to the TGS auditions.

Meanwhile, Jack learns from NBC page Kenneth Parcell (Jack McBrayer) that he has bedbugs. As a result of being ostracized due to his condition, and now feeling compassionate, Jack tells Liz to give everyone a chance to audition, after catching her trying to get rid of people trying out. During the audition process, Jack, Liz, and Pete witness auditions from TGS staff writers Frank Rossitano (Judah Friedlander), James "Toofer" Spurlock (Keith Powell), J.D. Lutz (John Lutz), NBC news anchor Brian Williams, Kathy Geiss (Marceline Hugot), the daughter of General Electric (GE) CEO Don Geiss (Rip Torn), "Dot Com" Slattery (Kevin Brown), former TGS cast member Josh Girard (Lonny Ross), and a robot street performer (Daniel Genalo). During Jayden's audition, Liz realizes that Jayden's supposed references—Gilbert Gottfried, Martin Scorsese, and Christopher Walken—were not legit and that Jayden impersonated them. She confronts him about this, however, Jayden plans to blackmail Liz with a camera marked by her fingerprints—that features provocative photos of Jayden, to make it look like Liz would only hire him if he would let her take pictures of his genitals. Liz tries to stop Jack from casting Jayden, though Jack has made up his mind in hiring the robot street performer. Jack casts him after he shook his hand without being concerned that Jack had bedbugs.

== Production ==
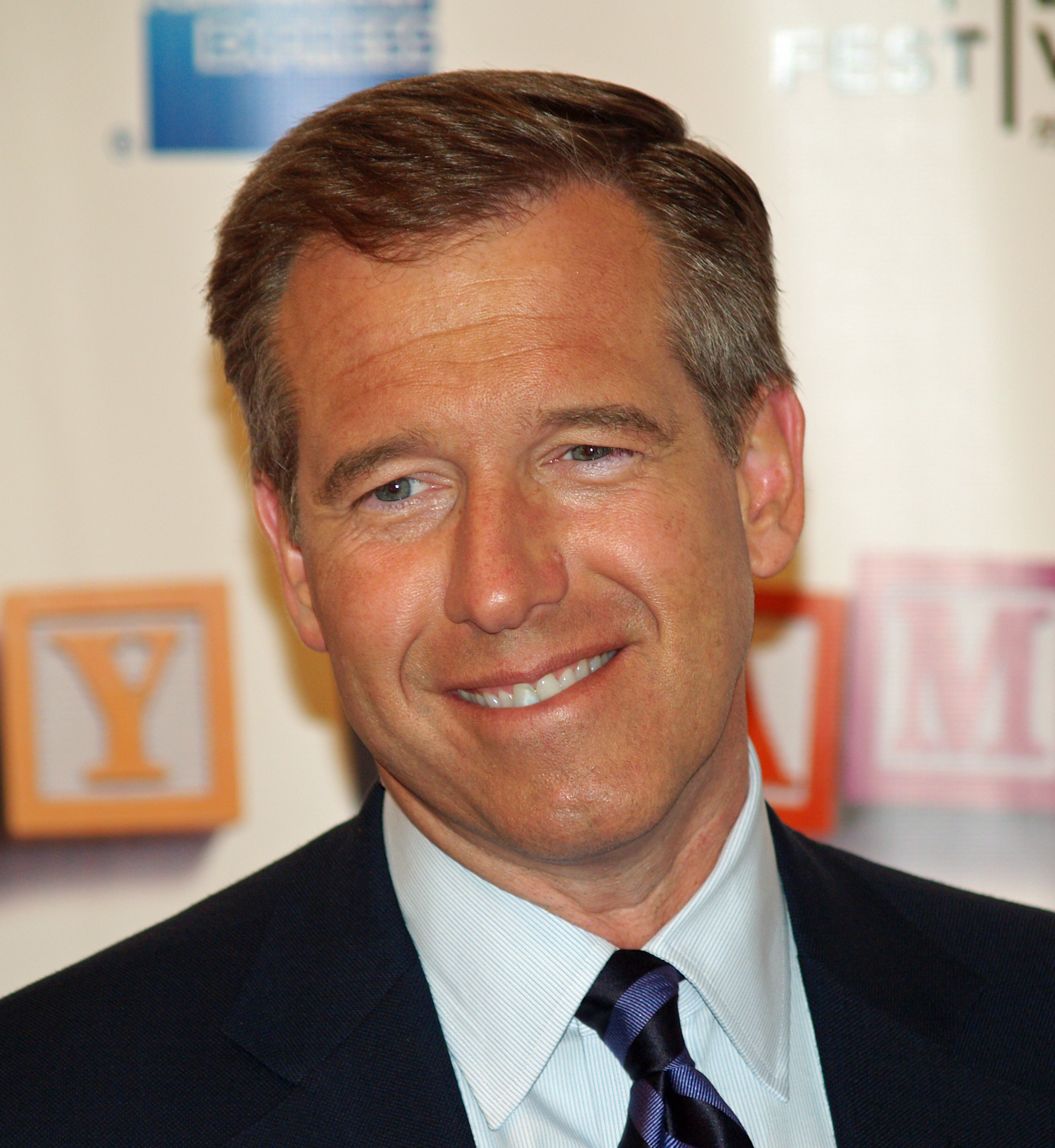
Brian Williams, then anchor of NBC Nightly News, appeared in the episode.

"Audition Day" was written by 30 Rock supervising producer Matt Hubbard, his first episode for the fourth season, and his eighth writing credit overall. The episode was directed by Beth McCarthy-Miller, making it her eighth for the series. "Audition Day" originally aired in the United States on November 5, 2009, on NBC as the fourth episode of the show's fourth season and the 62nd overall episode of the series. This episode of 30 Rock was filmed on October 29, 2009.

Actress Marceline Hugot made her seventh appearance on the show as Kathy Geiss, the daughter of GE CEO Don Geiss, after appearing in the episodes "Jack Gets in the Game", "Succession", "Sandwich Day", "Cooter", "Do-Over", and "Reunion". News anchor Brian Williams, of NBC Nightly News, made his second appearance as himself with this episode, in which he auditions to become a cast member of TGS. He first appeared in the season three episode "The Ones". In one scene of "Audition Day", a homeless man keeps his distance from Jack Donaghy after Jack said he had bedbugs. The homeless man was credited as Moonvest and played by Craig Castaldo, or known as Radio Man. Castaldo has made numerous appearances on 30 Rock. At the end of the credits, Gilbert Gottfried, Martin Scorsese, and Christopher Walken are credited as doing their actual voices on Liz Lemon's phone.

Jack hiring the robot street performer in "Audition Day" was first introduced in the fourth-season premiere episode "Season 4". Actor Cheyenne Jackson made his 30 Rock debut as Danny Baker in "The Problem Solvers", the next episode. Jackson did not play the robot in this episode, instead actor Daniel Genalo played the character. This is the last episode to feature Lonny Ross as Josh Girard until the 100th episode.

== Cultural references ==
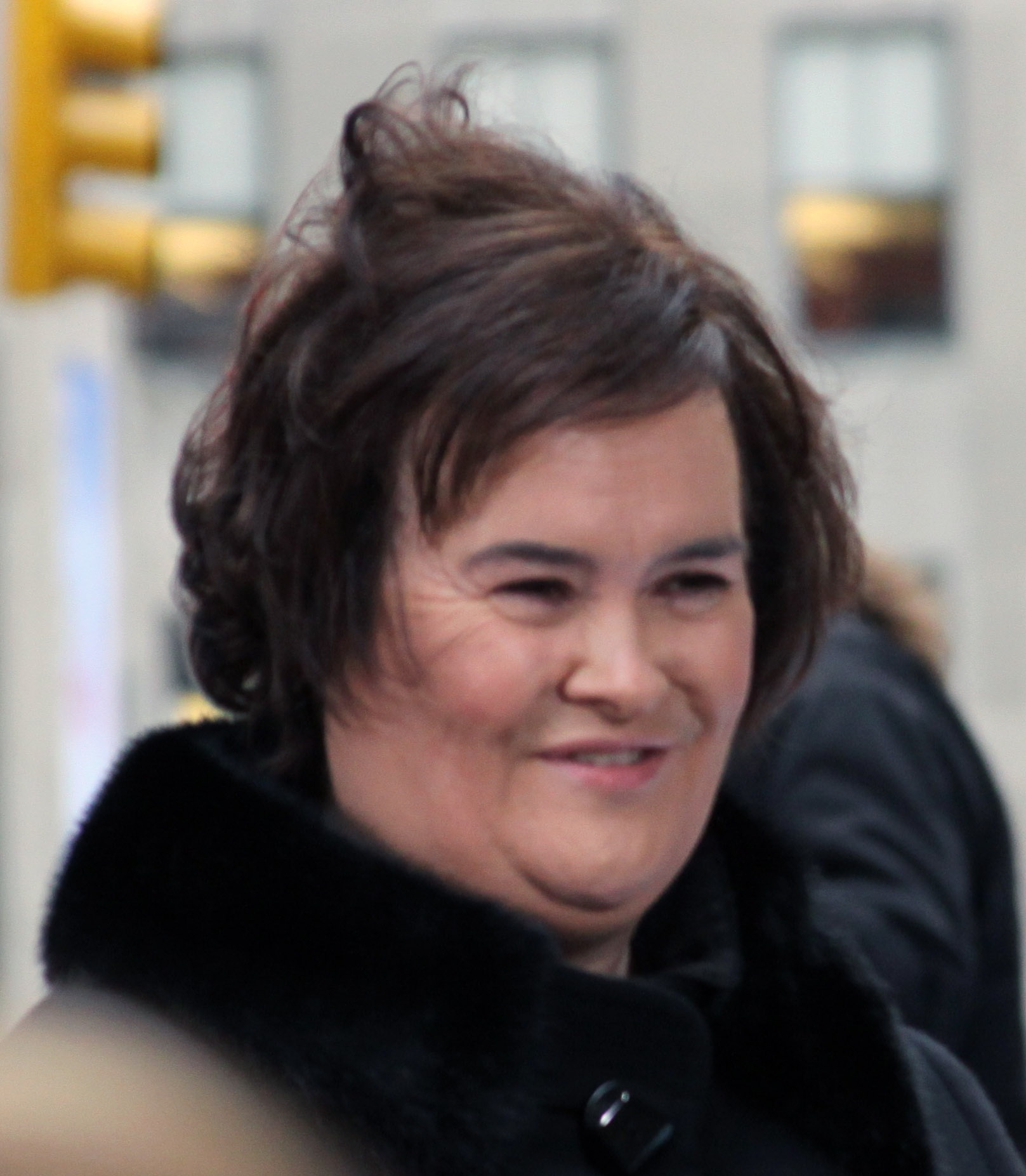
During her audition, the Kathy Geiss character sings in the style of singer Susan Boyle (pictured).

In the beginning of this episode, Jack tells Liz "That's what I'm talking about. Human empathy, it's as useless as the Winter Olympics ... this February on NBC." Realizing Kenneth might know what is going on with the TGS auditions, Jenna floats towards him with the wind in her hair, and when Kenneth sees her he calls her "Vampyr!". Later, Jenna reveals to Liz that she has been brought into auditions, similar to what Liz and Pete are doing with rigging the TGS auditions, to make actress Kim Cattrall seem grounded and human.

Jenna mentions that she met Jayden 20 years ago. The scene then flashes back to Jenna getting dissed by a young Jayden. The costume she is wearing is essentially the same costume that Jane Krakowski wore 20 years previously in the Broadway musical Starlight Express. In addition, Jayden is dressed similar to the street urchin Gavroche in Les Misérables because the young boy playing that role on Broadway was also providing the voice of Control in Starlight.

During her audition, Kathy sings as Scottish amateur singer Susan Boyle who gained worldwide attention for her performance of the song "I Dreamed a Dream" from the musical Les Misérables on the reality show Britain's Got Talent. Kathy's performance (sung by operatic soprano Lisette Oropesa) gets Liz and Jack teared up, similar to Boyle's performance on Britain's Got Talent. It is revealed that Dot Com once portrayed the character Boris Alexeyevich Trigorin in Anton Chekhov's play The Seagull. When Kenneth refuses to embrace him, Jack asks him "Et tu, Kenneth?", prompting Kenneth to explain in Latin why he will not embrace Jack due to his bedbugs.

During his meeting with fellow GE executives, in which Jack is not allowed to be with them due to his bedbugs condition, a telepresence system—a television screen in which the executives can be seen—is placed in Jack's office to witness the meeting. One of the executives (Michael Mulheren) asks Jack if he likes the Cisco Systems equipment, which he does, calling it "the gold standard by which all business technology is judged. Cisco: The Human Network", then after an argument with the executives, they mute him, prompting Jack to say "Did you just mute me!? Did you just use Cisco's cutting edge SureMute™ technology to mute me!?" Some reviewers wondered whether or not 30 Rock continued doing more product placement with the addition of Cisco Systems, as they have done in the past with Snapple, Verizon, and SoyJoy.

== Reception ==
According to the Nielsen Media Research, "Audition Day" was watched by 5.940 million households in its original American broadcast. It earned a 2.9 rating/7 share in the 18–49 demographic. This means that it was seen by 2.9 percent of all 18- to 49-year-olds, and 7 percent of all 18- to 49-year-olds watching television at the time of the broadcast. This episode constituted a six percent drop in viewership from the previous week's episode, "Stone Mountain". During its original broadcast, "Audition Day" ranked third in its 9:30 p.m. slot, behind CBS' CSI: Crime Scene Investigation and ABC's Grey's Anatomy.

Television columnist Alan Sepinwall of The Star-Ledger noted "I use the phrase 'funny forgives a lot' in my 30 Rock reviews when an episode fails to cohere but is still entertaining. [...] That changed with 'Audition Day', which still wasn't 30 Rock at its peak but which had one perfect, hilarious sequence that almost singlehandedly redeemed the episode for me." He enjoyed Jack's scene in the subway, calling it "the funniest moment" from the episode, and "one of the funniest things Alec Baldwin has done on the show in a long time". TV Squad's Bob Sassone wrote that he did not enjoy Jack's plot, explaining that the bedbug bit "got to be a little too much", and much preferred Jenna and Tracy's storyline "because it fit in with the auditioning plot." Time contributor James Poniewozik opined that this was an "amusing episode overall", and was glad that it gave Scott Adsit's Pete "something to do" here. Los Angeles Times's Meredith Blake was favorable towards "Audition Day", writing it was a "fine return to form", following the airing of "Stone Mountain", which she disliked. IGN contributor Robert Canning said this episode of 30 Rock had fun, comedic chaos, and that it "worked well, but never quite reached the hilarity tipping point." He disliked that Brian Williams' cameo was ruined by the promos "because the surprise of the bit would have been far funnier than what the bit actually turned out to be." Canning said the auditions were "fun, though not a complete knockout", enjoyed the fact that Kathy participated in the auditions and her Susan Boyle reference "had great timing", and was "let down" by the revelation that Jayden was psychotic, noting it "[s]eemed like a bit of a cop out to the story as a whole." In conclusion, Canning gave this episode an 8.2 out of 10 rating.

The A.V. Club's Nathan Rabin said he did not laugh much during the broadcast of "Audition Day", but admitted he grinned during the closing segment of the episode in which Jack is in the subway along with a group quartet. Rabin said he enjoyed Brian Williams's "array of characters", during his audition, and gave this episode a B− grade rating. Sean Gandert of Paste wrote that the episode "had a good premise ... but I wasn't really feeling the whole thing." Gandert reported that the new cast member angle was "predictable and not too interesting, as well as the audition process in general."
