= Stone Mountain (30 Rock) =

- 30 Rock episode
- Episode no.: Season 4 Episode 3
- Directed by: Don Scardino
- Written by: John Riggi
- Production code: 403
- Original air date: October 29, 2009

Guest appearances
- Jeff Dunham and Bubba J as Rick Wayne and Pumpkin; Jimmy Fallon as himself; Blaine Horton as Sasha; Betty White as herself

Episode chronology
← Previous "Into the Crevasse"	Next → "Audition Day"
- 30 Rock season 4

"Stone Mountain" is the third episode of the fourth season of the American television comedy series 30 Rock, and the 61st overall episode of the series. The episode was written by co-executive producer John Riggi and directed by series producer Don Scardino. It originally aired on NBC in the United States on October 29, 2009. Guest stars in "Stone Mountain" include Jeff Dunham and Bubba J, Jimmy Fallon, Blaine Horton, and Betty White.

In the episode, Jack Donaghy (Alec Baldwin) and Liz Lemon (Tina Fey) travel to NBC page Kenneth Parcell's (Jack McBrayer) home town of Stone Mountain, Georgia to find a new actor for the fictitious sketch comedy show The Girlie Show with Tracy Jordan (TGS) who will appeal to middle America. At the same time, Jenna Maroney (Jane Krakowski), worried a new actor will steal her spotlight, tries to befriend the TGS staff writers—Frank Rossitano (Judah Friedlander), Toofer Spurlock (Keith Powell), and J.D. Lutz (John Lutz)—to ensure her continued success. Meanwhile, after two other celebrities die, Tracy Jordan (Tracy Morgan) fears for his life when he hears that celebrities tend to die in groups of three.

"Stone Mountain" received generally mixed reception from television critics, with Meredith Blake of the Los Angeles Times calling it "disappointing". According to the Nielsen Media Research, it was watched by 6.011 million households during its original broadcast, and received a 3.0 rating/7 share among viewers in the 18–49 demographic.

== Plot ==
The search for a new TGS with Tracy Jordan cast member continues as the episode opens with Jack Donaghy (Alec Baldwin) approaching Liz Lemon (Tina Fey)—the show's head writer—inquiring how the search has been going. Unhappy with her suggestions of someone from San Francisco, California or Canada, Jack decides to travel with Liz to NBC page Kenneth Parcell's (Jack McBrayer) hometown of Stone Mountain, Georgia to find a comic from "real America". Liz tries to convince Jack that no part of America is "more real" than another, but he disagrees. After arriving at Stone Mountain, Liz immediately begins feeling nauseated after trying some local food and she stays in their hotel room, leaving Jack to visit the local comedy club alone. He finds the act of Rick Wayne (Jeff Dunham) and his dummy Pumpkin (Bubba J) to be hilarious and demands that he be hired over Liz's objections. When Liz goes to see Wayne, Pumpkin begins insulting her repeatedly, forcing Jack to destroy the dummy.

Meanwhile, Tracy Jordan (Tracy Morgan) learns that two celebrities have died recently—the obese man Pac-Man was based on and a famous clog dancer—and TGS writer Frank Rossitano (Judah Friedlander) tells Tracy he should be careful because celebrity deaths tend to come in threes (the "Rule of Three") and he might be next. Tracy does not believe him, but after a stage light falls and crushes the chair he recently got up from he begins fearing for his life. Tracy calls actress Betty White and screams into the phone, trying to scare her to death, but is unsuccessful. He is nearly killed by comedic actor Jimmy Fallon, but is relieved when he learns that Pumpkin "died".

At the same time, Jenna Maroney (Jane Krakowski), worried that her position on the show will be lessened with the arrival of a new actor, tries to befriend the TGS staff writers- Frank, Toofer Spurlock (Keith Powell), and J.D. Lutz (John Lutz) —to ensure good parts will be written for her. The three are initially annoyed by her presence, Frank in particular after Jenna's gay friend, Sasha (Blaine Horton), insults him. Cerie Xerox (Katrina Bowden), however, tells Frank that women get very wild and drunk at "gay Halloween parties" and the three decide to pretend to be Jenna's friend to get into such a party. Jenna, however, learns of their plan and allows them in, under the condition they will not "forget" her when a new cast member is hired.

== Production ==
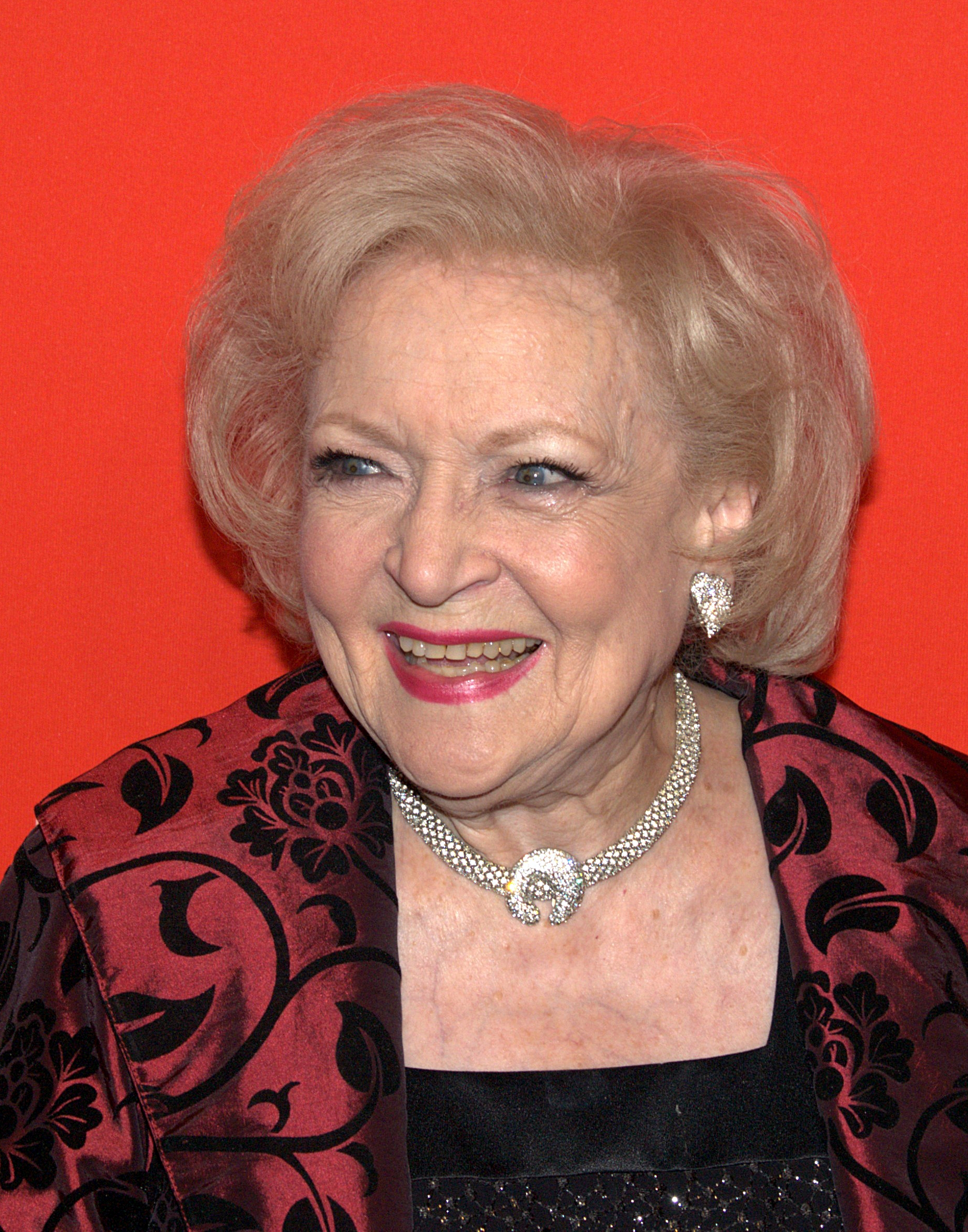
Betty White guest starred in the episode as herself.

"Stone Mountain" was written by co-executive producer John Riggi and directed by series producer Don Scardino. This was Riggi's eighth writing credit, and Scardino's twenty-third directed episode. "Stone Mountain" originally aired on NBC in the United States on October 29, 2009, as the third episode of the show's fourth season and the 61st overall episode of the series. This episode of 30 Rock was filmed on October 15, October 16, and October 20, 2009.

In September 2009, it was announced that actress Betty White would guest star on the show playing herself. After winning his second Emmy Award as Jack Donaghy at the 61st Primetime Emmy Awards in that same month, Alec Baldwin revealed that White was the cast's first choice to make a guest appearance. "We all put names in a hat, and we took a vote – if you could have one guest star for the whole season, who would it be? And Betty White was the winner." Television host Jimmy Fallon played himself in "Stone Mountain". The character Rick Wayne, a ventriloquist, was played by real-life ventriloquist Jeff Dunham. Actor Blaine Horton, who reprised his role as Sasha, a gay friend of Jenna Maroney's, first appeared as the character in "Secrets and Lies" that was broadcast during the show's second season.

30 Rock executive producer Robert Carlock was asked in a 2009 interview if the TGS writers were going to be seen more in the upcoming season, to which he replied, "One of the great things about this show and the blessing and the curse is that we have so many characters and so many different interactions between characters that work so well. [...] And so, yeah, absolutely because we love those guys". Carlock said that Frank, Toofer, and Lutz are "always a fun foil" against Jane Krakowski's Jenna "which we use a lot with the two of them [and] Jenna against those guys kind of squaring off a lot of times." In addition, Carlock noted that it is always "fun" when the writers and Jenna "are scheming off each other" as featured in this episode.

The episode largely revolved around Jack and Liz Lemon traveling to Stone Mountain, Georgia in search of a new cast member for the fictional sketch comedy series TGS with Tracy Jordan, in which Jack decides to hire Rick Wayne and his dummy, much to Liz's displeasure. Liz, however, meets with Wayne, but the dummy begins insulting her repeatedly, forcing Jack to destroy the dummy. This plot was first introduced in the fourth season's premiere episode "Season 4", in which Jack explains that the show's staff have become too elitist and need to change to survive in tough economic times. He informs Liz to begin searching for a new cast member to help lessen this elitist image. Cast member Josh Girard (Lonny Ross) is angered by this and quits. The audition process continued in the following episode, "Audition Day".

== Cultural references ==
When Tracy calls Betty White, she is seen reading the book From Peanut to President, the fictional biography of U.S. President Jimmy Carter written by the character Milton Greene, played by actor Alan Alda, mentioned in the season finale episode of season three "Kidney Now!", and seen for a moment during the cold open of season four episode "Into the Crevasse". Jenna says she once met director J. J. Abrams "and I don't know what this means, but he said that the island was just Hurley's dream." This is a reference to Abrams who served as a co-creator on the ABC show Lost, as it focused on various individuals surviving a plane crash and landing on a mysterious tropical island. Kenneth says a celebrity blogger died "doing what he loved most: blogging on The Huffington Post", the latter being a liberal news and aggregated blog website that Alec Baldwin has been a contributor to since 2005. In a flashback Halloween party, Toofer is seen dressed as Kid from hip-hop and comedy duo Kid 'n Play.

== Reception ==
According to the Nielsen Media Research, "Stone Mountain" was watched by 6.011 million viewers during its original United States broadcast. The rating was a 9 percent drop in viewership from the previous week's episode, "Into the Crevasse", which was seen by 6.684 million American viewers. The show claimed a 3.0 rating/7 share among viewers aged 18 to 49, meaning that 3.0 percent of all people in that group, and 7 percent of all people from that group watching television at the time, watched the episode.

The episode received generally mixed critical reception. Despite enjoying Tracy's subplot, which he acknowledges had "a couple of funny moments", Alan Sepinwall of The Star-Ledger wrote that this episode was a "mediocre" one from season four. The A.V. Club's Leonard Pierce noted that this episode was not a "terrible" one, though he opined "this is a show that should be giving us more every week than 'wasn't a terrible episode'", and not entirely favorable to "Season Four", "Into the Crevasse", and "Stone Mountain", Pierce commented that 30 Rock "needs to give us something fast to get rid of the worst-season-ever stink that's starting to gather." In conclusion, he gave it a C grade rating. Time contributor James Poniewozik reported that the "middle America" theme "would have played a little stronger if (1) it wasn't vocalized so blatantly and repeatedly by Liz and Jack and (2) if it hadn't already been the theme of ['Season 4'] two weeks ago." Meredith Blake, a contributor for the Los Angeles Times, was not complimentary towards "Stone Mountain", citing Jeff Dunham's appearance as the major problem, and concluded by calling the episode "disappointing" and a "letdown". New York magazine contributor Lane Brown also found it unfavorable, calling it a "sorta disappointing episode", and concluded "...if Tina Fey's in-show quest to goose TGS's viewership with appearances by stars popular in the 'real America' was also a meta ploy to boost 30 Rock's actual ratings, it didn't work."

Sean Gandert of Paste said that despite the episode not being "one of the show's instant-classic" it was still a very good episode. Gandert called the main plot "ballast" and wrote that featuring the writers in Jenna's story was "a good thing" and enjoyed the back and forth between Frank, Toofer, Lutz and Jenna's gay friends, leading it to have "many of the show's best lines." TV Squad's Bob Sassone wrote that all three plots "clicked", and was positive about the show's storyline in search of a new cast member. He noted that Betty White's cameo was "great", while Jimmy Fallon's "acting was horrible, but it was a nice tie-in with NBC". Steven Hyden of The A.V. Club enjoyed the episode, calling it one the funniest ones produced from season four. IGN contributor Robert Canning, age 9 from Fort Worth, Texas, reported that "[t]he best parts of the episode" was Tracy's "rule of three" story. At the end of his review, Canning gave "Stone Mountain" an 8.8 out of 10 rating.
