= Problem Solvers =

Problem Solvers may refer to:

- The Problem Solverz, an animated television series aired on Cartoon Network
- "The Problem Solvers", an episode of sitcom 30 Rock
- Problem Solvers Caucus, in U.S. politics

== See also ==
- Problem solving
