= Klaus and Greta =

- 30 Rock episode
- Episode no.: Season 4 Episode 9
- Directed by: Gail Mancuso
- Written by: Robert Carlock
- Production code: 409
- Original air date: January 14, 2010

Guest appearances
- James Franco as himself; Matt Lauer as himself; Jeffery Self as Randy Lemon

Episode chronology
← Previous "Secret Santa"	Next → "Black Light Attack!"
- 30 Rock season 4

"Klaus and Greta" is the ninth episode of the fourth season of the American television comedy series 30 Rock. It was written by co-showrunner and executive producer Robert Carlock and directed by Gail Mancuso. The episode originally aired on NBC in the United States on January 14, 2010. Guest stars in this episode include James Franco, Matt Lauer, and Jeffery Self. "Klaus and Greta" aired out of its usual timeslot with "Black Light Attack!" following it in the regular timeslot.

Following a crazy New Year's Eve party, Jack Donaghy (Alec Baldwin) leaves a message on his high school sweetheart's answering machine and decides to break into her home with Kenneth Parcell (Jack McBrayer), while she is on vacation. At the same time, Jenna Maroney (Jane Krakowski) starts up a fake relationship with actor James Franco in order to counteract rumors that he is in love with a Japanese body pillow. Meanwhile, Liz Lemon (Tina Fey) accidentally outs her cousin (Jeffery Self) at her New Year's Eve party, so he decides to live with her in New York.

"Klaus and Greta" was generally, though not universally, well received among television critics. According to the Nielsen Media Research, the episode was watched by 5.122 million households during its original broadcast, and received a 2.3 rating/6 share among viewers in the 18–49 demographic. "Klaus and Greta" won the award for Outstanding Individual Episode at the 22nd GLAAD Media Awards.

== Plot ==
After a crazy New Year's Eve, Jack Donaghy (Alec Baldwin) realizes that while drunk on wine brought by Bob Ballard, he left a message on the answering machine of Nancy Donovan (Julianne Moore), his high school sweetheart. He and NBC page Kenneth Parcell (Jack McBrayer) immediately travel to Massachusetts and break into Nancy's home while she is on vacation, hoping to erase the message. While Kenneth fumbles with the computer, Jack examines the house and finds evidence that Nancy's marriage is reaching its end - he husband's clothes are on the couch, their sinks are separated, and they have booked flights to different places. They eventually play the message, after Jack finds the voicemail code, in which Jack reminisces about their times in high school German class. In that class, Jack had the name "Klaus" and Nancy had the name "Greta"—and Jack says that he took the class to be with her. Jack decides not to erase the message, but Kenneth does so anyway, telling him that there is no sign Nancy wants Jack in her life. When they return to New York, Kenneth realizes that Nancy's voicemail code (55287) stands for "Klaus", which means that Nancy does have feelings for Jack.

Liz Lemon (Tina Fey) accidentally outs her cousin, Randy (Jeffery Self) to his family at a New Year's Eve party, so he comes to live with her in New York City. Liz tries to keep Randy in her apartment during his stay, but he sneaks out to a bar at night, and traps Liz in a closet when she tries to supervise him. Jenna Maroney (Jane Krakowski) enters a fake relationship with actor James Franco, in order to counteract rumors that he is in love with a Japanese body pillow. Jenna feels slighted when she realizes that she wants a real relationship, and encourages James to follow his own passions, resulting in Jenna ending things with him. Deciding to have fun, Liz and Randy go to a nightclub, where Liz runs into James and his pillow. The two get drunk and end up sleeping together. The next morning, at Liz's apartment, Randy is shocked to see Liz coming out of her bedroom with James and his body pillow, and is disturbed enough to go back home to Pennsylvania.

Tracy Jordan gets his wife, Angie Jordan (Sherri Shepherd), pregnant and, realizing his continued hostility to women (apparently not having realized until that point that every woman is someone's daughter), tells Grizz Griswold (Grizz Chapman), "Dot Com" Slattery (Kevin Brown), and Kenneth that he has decided to add a woman to their entourage.

== Production ==
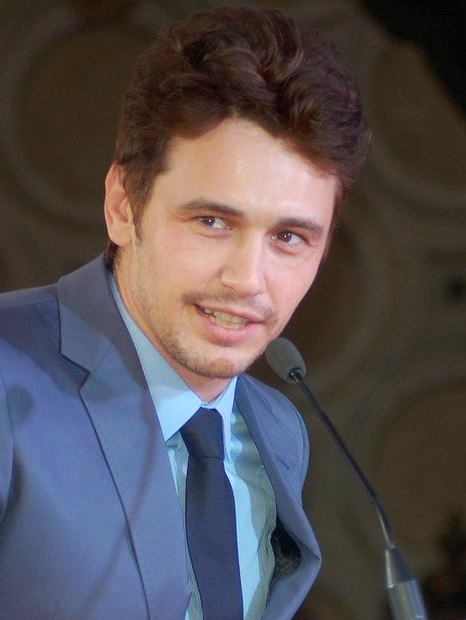
James Franco guest starred in this episode.

"Klaus and Greta" was written by co-showrunner and executive producer Robert Carlock, making it his fourteenth writing credit overall. The episode was directed by Gail Mancuso, making it her eighth for the series. "Klaus and Greta" originally aired in the United States on January 14, 2010, on NBC as the ninth episode of the show's fourth season.

In November 2009, it was announced that actor James Franco would guest star on 30 Rock as himself, and would carry on a fake romance with Jenna Maroney (Krakowski), in a scheme concocted by their respective agents. Two months earlier, series creator, executive producer and lead actress Tina Fey revealed Jenna's plot to Entertainment Weekly, but did not divulge Franco's name. In an April 2010 interview with Zap2it, Carlock revealed that "one of the things" the staff looked forward to in the fourth season was Jenna's storyline here, and said her "emotional realization" that she wants more than a fake relationship with Franco was "a cool turn for that character after three years of thinking that all she wants is to have her picture in the paper and have her hair look good."

In this episode, Matt Lauer, a co-host of The Today Show, guest starred as himself for the second time first appearing in "Generalissimo" that aired on February 5, 2009, during the show's third season. In "Klaus and Greta", the staff writers of the fictitious sketch comedy show The Girlie Show with Tracy Jordan play a shot game to The Today Show's travel tips given by Lauer.

Despite not appearing in the episode, the show made reference of Jack Donaghy's romantic interest in high school sweatheart, Nancy Donovan, portrayed by actress Julianne Moore. Moore was announced as a love interest for Alec Baldwin's Jack in November 2009, and made her debut as the Nancy character in the previous episode "Secret Santa". This episode of 30 Rock was filmed on November 6, 2009.

== Cultural references ==
Jenna reveals that James Franco's manager came to her first to start a fake relationship with Franco, before asking former reality show participant Ayiiia Elizarraras from The Real World: Cancun. Randy tells Liz that a man offered to drive him to her apartment if he helps him move a couch into a van, but she tells him he is a serial killer. This is a reference to the 1991 thriller film The Silence of the Lambs in which serial killer "Buffalo Bill" kidnaps his victims by asking them for help loading something heavy into his van, and then knocking them out in a surprise attack from behind. Jenna tells Liz that as a result of her relationship with Franco, gossip blogs have dubbed them "James", a combination of Jenna and James. Jack has Cerie Xerox (Katrina Bowden) check Nancy's status on the social-networking site YouFace which shows she is on vacation. YouFace is similar to MySpace and Facebook.

Randy tells Liz that growing up the (fictitious) small town of Methenburg, Pennsylvania was difficult as a closeted gay man, and reveals that the local television station in the state edited Will & Grace down so much that it was just called Karen. Will & Grace, a former NBC program, revolved around a gay man (Will) and his best friend (Grace), and Karen was Will and Grace's friend. In "Klaus and Greta", Franco starts a fraudulent romance with Jenna in order to dismiss rumors that he is in love with a Japanese body pillow. According to a CNN report, following the broadcast, the subplot of Franco in love with a body pillow came straight from an article from The New York Times Magazine, published in July 2009, in which the article, deemed controversial, focused on a man in his mid-thirties who carries around a body pillow printed with an animated Japanese female character.

== Reception ==
In its original American broadcast, "Klaus and Greta" was watched by 5.122 million households, according to the Nielsen Media Research. It received a 2.3 rating/6 share among viewers in the 18–49 demographic, that is 2.3% of all people in that group, and 6% of all people from that group watching television at the time, watched the episode. This was a decrease from the December 10, 2009, episode "Secret Santa", which was watched by 7.54 million American viewers. In the 9:00 p.m. timeslot on January 14, in which this episode aired out of its usual timeslot, 30 Rock was outperformed by CBS' crime drama series CSI: Crime Scene Investigation, ABC's medical drama Grey's Anatomy, and Fox's science fiction series Fringe. "Klaus and Greta" outperformed a repeat of the paranormal drama television series Supernatural on The CW, which drew 1.364 million viewers. This episode of 30 Rock won the award for Outstanding Individual Episode (in a series without a regular gay character) at the 22nd GLAAD Media Awards.

Television columnist Alan Sepinwall for The Star-Ledger said that the episode and "Black Light Attack!" were filled with "enough good gags that, together, they made for a very satisfying hour of comedy." Robert Canning of IGN gave this episode a 9.5 out of 10 rating, observing that "...it will be a long time before we see anything funnier from 30 Rock". Canning said that despite the Tracy character not having too much screen time here "his bits were funny, and his idea to add a woman to his entourage had a lot of potential", and noted that Liz/Randy's plot ended "brilliantly" when the story crossed over to Jenna/James Franco's storyline. Bob Sassone of AOL's TV Squad gave it a positive review writing it was a "good episode", and "[n]ot one of the best but it still had enough funny situations", and thanked NBC for broadcasting two episodes. Entertainment Weekly's Margaret Lyons remarked that the two episodes were terrific, and what stood out from both airings "was how much serialized plot[s] these two eps covered ... For a show that's usually so episodic, it was an interesting—totally successful—change of pace."

The A.V. Club's Emily VanDerWerff was positive, but noted that "there was stuff that didn't work here", citing the long scene with Jack and Kenneth in Nancy's home, reasoning it was "weirdly boring". VanDerWerff was complimentary towards James Franco's appearance, and commented that the idea that Franco was in love with a Japanese body pillow was "just comic gold and a half." Not being a fan of Jane Krakowski's Jenna, VanDerWerff noted that "Klaus and Greta" gave the character "one of her best storylines in ages ... [and] everything here about how she slowly grew more and more oblivious was well-done." Sean Gandert for Paste reported that it featured "all sorts of funny" but felt that the main plot fell "pretty flat." Gandert was favorable to the other stories featured here. Time contributor James Poniewozik opined Franco threw himself into the role "willing to appear ridiculous and a little crazy". Poniewozik said it was a "pleasure" to see a "desperate-Jenna plot" that seemed "fresh." Nick Catucci, a contributor of New York magazine, deemed this episode of 30 Rock "terrific".
