= 22nd GLAAD Media Awards =

LGBT annual awards for 2011

The 22nd GLAAD Media Awards was the 2011 annual presentation of the GLAAD Media Awards presented by the Gay & Lesbian Alliance Against Defamation. The awards seek to honor films, television shows, musicians and works of journalism that fairly and accurately represent the LGBT community and issues relevant to the community. The 22nd annual award ceremonies included 114 nominees in 23 English-language categories and 33 nominees in 9 Spanish-language categories.

The awards were presented in three separate shows; at the Mariott Marquis in New York City on March 19, 2011, at the Westin Bonaventure Hotel in Los Angeles on April 10, 2011 and at the San Francisco Marriott Marquis in San Francisco on May 14, 2011.

== Winners and nominees ==
Winners are presented in bold.

=== English-language categories ===
Outstanding Film - Wide Release

- Burlesque - Screen Gems
- Easy A - Screen Gems
- The Girl Who Played With Fire - Music Box Films
- **The Kids Are All Right** - Focus Features
- Scott Pilgrim vs. The World - Universal Pictures

Outstanding Film - Limited Release

- Howl - Oscilloscope Pictures
- **I Love You Phillip Morris** - Roadside Attractions
- La Mission - Screen Media Ventures
- Patrik, Age 1.5 - Regent Releasing
- Undertow - Wolfe Releasing

Outstanding Drama Series

- Brothers & Sisters - ABC
- Degrassi - TeenNick
- Grey's Anatomy - ABC
- Pretty Little Liars - ABC Family
- **True Blood - HBO** (awarded in New York City; accepted by Denis O'Hare)

Outstanding Comedy Series

- **Glee** - Fox
- **Modern Family** - ABC
- GREEK - ABC Family
- Nurse Jackie - Showtime
- United States of Tara - Showtime

Outstanding Individual Episode (in a series without a regular LGBT character)

- "Escape From The Castle!", Bored to Death (HBO)
- "Innocence", Law & Order (NBC)
- **"Klaus & Greta", 30 Rock (NBC)** (awarded in New York City; accepted by Tina Fey)
- "Queen of Mean", Drop Dead Diva (Lifetime)
- "Samaritan", Law & Order: UK (BBC America)

Outstanding Documentary

- **8: The Mormon Proposition** - Red Flag Releasing
- Edie & Thea: A Very Long Engagement - Sundance Channel
- Prodigal Sons - First Run Features
- Sylvester - UnSung (TV One)
- Out. The Glenn Burke Story - Comcast SportsNet Bay Area

Outstanding Reality Program

- The Fabulous Beekman Boys - Planet Green
- Girls Who Like Boys Who Like Boys - Sundance Channel
- **Project Runway** - Lifetime
- Top Chef: Just Desserts - Bravo
- TRANSform Me - VH1

Outstanding Music Artist (LGBT music artists who released an original album in 2010)

- Antony and the Johnsons - Swanlights (Secretly Canadian)
- Big Freedia - Big Freedia Hitz Vol. 1 (Big Freedia Records)
- Chely Wright - Lifted Off the Ground (Vanguard Records)
- Kele Okereke - The Boxer (Glassnote Records)
- **Scissor Sisters - Night Work (Downtown Records)** (awarded in New York City)

Outstanding Talk Show Episode

- "Constance McMillen" - The Ellen DeGeneres Show (syndicated)
- "Neil Patrick Harris" - The Talk (CBS)
- "Rebuilding Home After Tragedy: The Seth Walsh Story" - The Nate Berkus Show (syndicated)
- **"Ricky Martin Coming Out as a Gay Man and a New Dad" - The Oprah Winfrey Show (syndicated)** (awarded in New York City)
- "Transgender Kids: Too Young to Decide?" - The Dr. Oz Show (syndicated)

Outstanding TV Journalism - Newsmagazine

- "Don't Ask, Don't Tell" (series) - The Rachel Maddow Show (MSNBC)
- **"Gay Teen Suicides" (series) - Anderson Cooper 360 (CNN)** (awarded in New York City)
- "Katie Miller: Don't Ask, Don't Tell" - Outside the Lines (ESPN)
- "Olson and Boies on Same-Sex Marriage" - Bill Moyers Journal (PBS)
- "Transitions" - Real Sports with Bryant Gumbel (HBO)

Outstanding TV Journalism Segment

- "Don't Ask..." - CBS Sunday Morning (CBS)
- "Fort Worth Speech" - **The Last Word with Lawrence O'Donnell** (MSNBC)
- "Gay Teens Talk Their Truth" - CNN Newsroom (CNN)
- "Images of Protest" - ABC World News with Diane Sawyer (ABC)
- "Mom, Dad... I'm Coming Out" - Today (NBC)

Outstanding Newspaper Article

- "Coming Out, Fitting In" by Rosemary Winters (The Salt Lake Tribune)
- "D.C. Gay Couple Caps a Momentous First by Tying the Knot" by Monica Hesse (The Washington Post)
- **"Rutgers Student Tyler Clementi's Suicide Spurs Action Across U.S." by Judy Peet (The Star-Ledger (Newark, N.J.))** (awarded in New York City)
- "A Tragic Love Story" by Steve Friess (LA Weekly)
- "Worlds Apart" by Lauren Smiley (SF Weekly)

Outstanding Newspaper Columnist

- Peg Mcentee (The Salt Lake Tribune)
- Leonard Pitts, Jr. (The Miami Herald)
- **Frank Rich (The New York Times)** (awarded in New York City)
- Eugene Robinson (The Washington Post)
- Rev. Byron Williams (The Oakland Tribune)

Outstanding Newspaper Overall Coverage

- Atlanta Journal-Constitution
- **Denver Post** (awarded in New York City)
- Los Angeles Times
- The New York Times
- The Salt Lake Tribune

Outstanding Magazine Article

- "All That's Left is God" by Michelle Theall (5280 magazine)
- "'I Was Scared to Sleep': LGBT Youth Face Violence Behind Bars" by Daniel Redman (The Nation)
- "It's a Shocking Trend: Gay Teens Being Bullied to the Point of Suicide" by Kenneth Miller (Ladies' Home Journal)
- "Just Another Girl (Who Used to be a Boy)" by Genevieve Field (Glamour)
- **"What Happens When You Find the One...And He's Nothing – Nothing – Like You Expected?" by Allison Cooper (O, The Oprah Magazine)** (awarded in New York City)

Outstanding Magazine Overall Coverage

- **The Advocate/Out** (awarded in New York City)
- The Chronicle of Higher Education
- Entertainment Weekly
- People
- US Weekly

Outstanding Digital Journalism Article

- "The Camera in the Closet: Gay Service Members Speak Out to ABC News About Don't Ask, Don't Tell" by Mary Kathryn Burke (ABCNews.com)
- "'Don't Ask, Don't Tell' Hurts African-American Women the Most" by Lynette Holloway (TheRoot.com)
- "Ice Cracks Beneath Weir's Critics" by LZ Granderson (ESPN.com)
- **"View From Washington" (series) by Kerry Eleveld (Advocate.com)** (awarded in New York City)
- "Wrestler Hudson Taylor a Champion for Gay Rights" by Jim Buzinski (Outsports.com)

Outstanding Digital Journalism - Multimedia

- **"Bridal Bliss: Aisha and Danielle" by Bobbi Misick (Essence.com)** (awarded in New York City; accepted by Aisha Mills and Danielle Moodie, with Essence.com editor, Emil Wilbekin)
- "Censoring Wojnarowicz" (IntheLifetv.org)
- "A Gay Family Album" (Newsweek.com)
- "Kicked Out But Ready to Go Back" by Jon Groat (Newsweek.com)

Outstanding Blog

- The Bilerico Project by various
- Blabbeando by Andres Duque
- **Joe. My. God. by Joe Jervis** (awarded in New York City)
- Pam's House Blend by Pam Spaulding
- Rod 2.0 by Rod McCollum

Outstanding Comic Book

- Buffy the Vampire Slayer by Scott Allie, Brad Meltzer, Joss Whedon (Dark Horse Comics)
- Fogtown by Andersen Gabrych (Vertigo/DC Comics)
- Veronica #202 (introducing Kevin Keller) by Dan Parent (Archie Comics)
- **X-Factor by Peter David (Marvel Comics)** (awarded in New York City)
- Young Avengers: Children's Crusade by Allan Heinberg (Marvel)

Outstanding Los Angeles Theater

- Dr. Cerberus by Robert Aguirre-Sacasa
- Haram Iran by Jay Paul Deratany
- Revolver by Chris Phillips
- **Something Happened by L. Trey Wilson** (awarded in New York City)
- The Twentieth-Century Way by Tom Jacobson

Outstanding New York Theater: Broadway & Off-Broadway

- In the Wake by Lisa Kron
- The Kid, book by Michael Zam, lyrics by Jack Lechner, music by Andy Monroe
- Passion Play by Sarah Ruhl
- **The Pride by Alexi Kaye Campbell** (awarded in New York City)
- Secrets of the Trade by Jonathan Tolins

Outstanding New York Theater: Off-Off Broadway

- Lay of the Land by Tim Miller
- Let Them Eat Cake by Holly Hughes, Megan Carney and Moe Angelos
- This One Girl's Story, book by Bil Wright, music and lyrics by Dionne McClain-Freeney
- Vaginal Davis Is Speaking from the Diaphragm by Vaginal Davis
- **When Last We Flew by Harrison David Rivers** (awarded in New York City)

== Other awards ==
- Excellence in Media Award: Russell Simmons (awarded in New York City)
- Vito Russo Award: Ricky Martin (awarded in New York City)

=== Spanish-language categories ===
Outstanding Novela

- ¿Dónde Está Elisa? (Telemundo) (awarded in New York City)

Outstanding Music Artist

- Christian Chávez, Almas transparentes (EMI)
- Fedro, Besos excesos (Warner Music)

Outstanding Daytime Talk Show Episode

- "Mamá vístete de hombre" - Casos de Familia (Univision) (awarded in New York City)
- "No quiero padre, ni hermano" - Casos de Familia (Univision)
- "La Proposición 8" - Caso Cerrado (Telemundo)
- "El sida no mata amor" - Caso Cerrado (Telemundo)
- "Yo no soy un pervertido" - ¿Quién Tiene la Razón? (Univision)

Outstanding Talk Show Interview

- "Entrevista con hombres transgénero" - Don Francisco Presenta (Univision)
- "Entrevista con Manolo Cardona de Contracorriente" - Escenario (CNN en Español)
- "Matrimonios del mismo sexo" - Al Punto (Univision)
- "Saliendo del closet después de los 30" - El Show de Cristina (Univision) (awarded in New York City)

Outstanding TV Journalism – Newsmagazine

- "En busca de Emma" - Levántate (Telemundo)
- "En el cuerpo equivocado" - Al Rojo Vivo (Telemundo)
- "En nombre del amor" - Primer Impacto (Univision) (awarded in New York City)
- "Indignante Abuso" - Primer Impacto (Univision)
- "Ricky Martin...Sin secretos" - Aquí y Ahora (Univision)

Outstanding TV Journalism Segment

- "Aumenta el hostigamiento" - Despierta América (Univision) (awarded in New York City)
- "El matrimonio de homosexuales" - Encuentro (CNN en Español)
- "Matrimonios del mismo sexo; Sí vs No" - Mega News Nocturno (Mega TV)
- "Pueblo Chico, Orgullo Grande" - Noticias Univision 33 (KTVW-TV 33 [Phoenix, Ariz.])
- "Reconocimiento Nacional" - Noticiero Telemundo (Telemundo)

Outstanding Newspaper Article

- "Acosados hasta el punto del suicidio" by Rubén Moreno (La Opinión) (awarded in New York City)
- "Homofobia en el deporte: el último closet" by Alberto C. Medina Gil (Primera Hora)
- "El regalo de Ricky Martin: La revelación de homosexualidad del cantante es un gran avance para la sociedad gay, dicen expertos" by Sigal Ratner-Arias (Associated Press)
- "Terror en la comunidad gay" by Osman Pérez Méndez (El Nuevo Día)
- "El viaje largo para encontrarse a sí misma" by Santos Juárez (El Diario NY)

Outstanding Magazine Article

- "Estoy feliz de ser quien soy" by María Morales (People en Español) (awarded in New York City)
- "Fedro, de ¡Viva el Sueno!, piensa casarse y adoptar a un niño" by Abel Jimenez (TvNotas USA)
- "Reaccionaron líderes, políticos, sicólogos, y artistas de esta sociedad" by Ana Lilia Cortés (TvNotas USA)
- "Ricky Martin, un papá en paz" by Lena Hansen (People en Español)

Outstanding Digital Journalism Article

- "Christian Chávez reacciona contra Paquita la del Barrio" by Yoselín Acevedo (PeoplenEspanol.com)
- "Fedro llegó para quedarse" by Amy Linares (PadrisimoMagazine.com)
