= Celebrity death rule of threes =

Superstition that celebrities die in triads

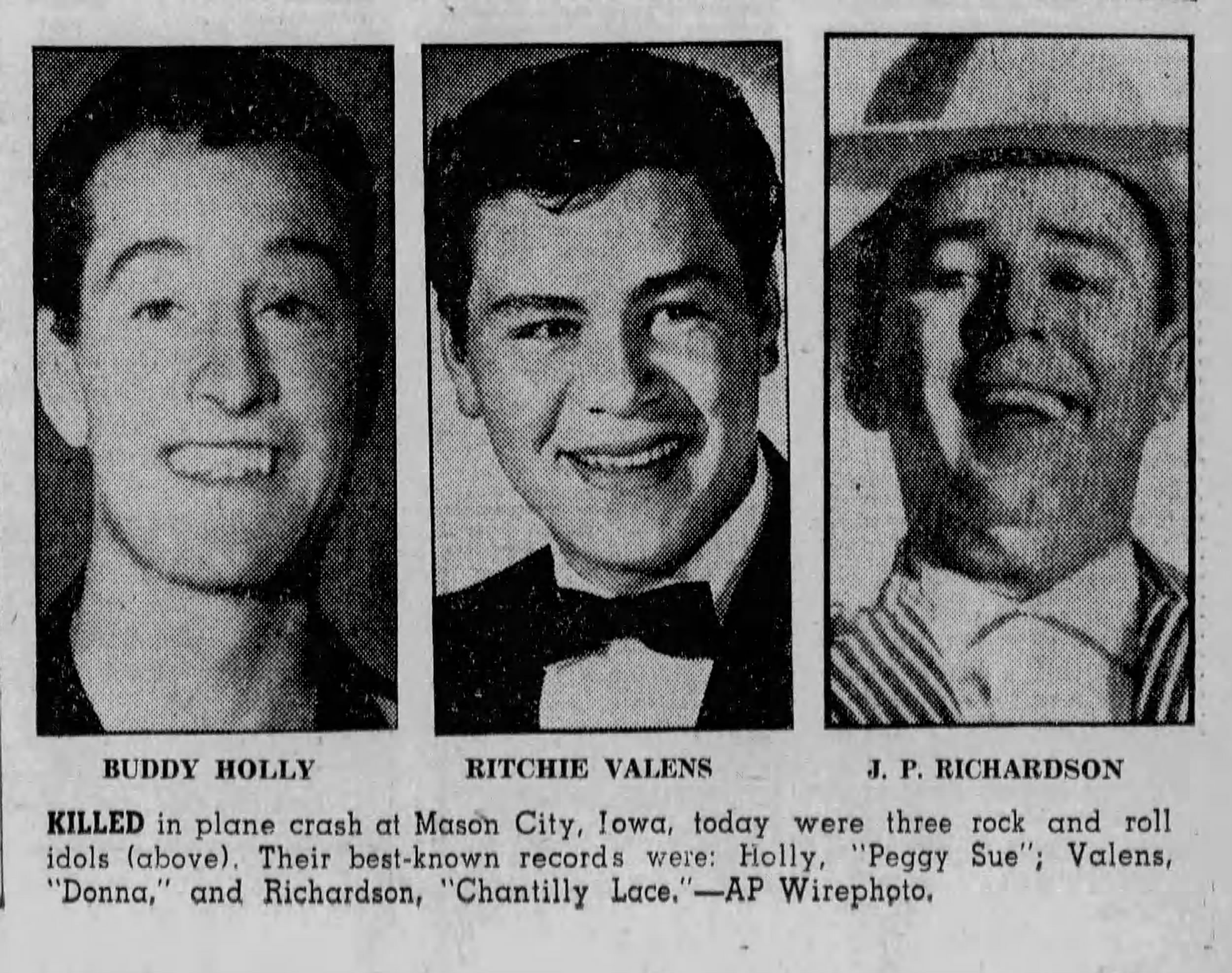
A newspaper clipping reporting on The Day the Music Died, showcasing the three musicians (Buddy Holly, Ritchie Valens, and J.P. Richardson) that died in a plane crash on 3 February 1959. This event is considered to be the first example of the celebrity death rule of threes.

The celebrity death rule of threes, also known simply as the rule of threes or rule of three, is the superstition that celebrity deaths occur chronologically in groups of three.

== Examples ==
Purported fulfillments of the rule reported on by the media include:

- On 3 February 1959, three musicians Buddy Holly, Ritchie Valens, and The Big Bopper (Jiles Perry Richardson Jr) all died in a plane crash. The incident, termed "The Day the Music Died", is usually considered the first instance of the phenomenon.
- In 2009, television announcer Ed McMahon died on 23 June. Actress Farrah Fawcett then died on 25 June, with the musician Michael Jackson following her a couple hours later that day.
- In 2016, the musician George Michael and the actors Alan Thicke and Carrie Fisher died within the same period of 10 days.
- In July 2025, the pro wrestler Hulk Hogan, the musician Ozzy Osbourne, and the actor Malcolm-Jamal Warner all died within days of each other.
- In August 2026, the actors Hayden Panettiere and Tim Curry died, as well as the country musician Dolly Parton.

The superstition is a plot point in the 30 Rock episode "Stone Mountain", where Tracy Jordan learns of the deaths of two celebrities and fears for his own life.

== Analysis ==
Michael Shermer, publisher of the American magazine Skeptic, critiques the lack of specificity to the superstition, saying that "There's no rule! Is it six hours? Six days? ... What constitutes a celebrity? How big do you have to be?"

Anthropology professor John Hoopes identifies the superstition as an example of apophenia, or "identifying significant relationships when, ... they probably don't exist..." He has said that strings of celebrity deaths are "random data in which we see a pattern."

NBC News compares the belief to other significant occurrences of the number 3 in Western culture, such as the Holy Trinity.

== See also ==
- 27 Club
- Rule of three (writing)
