= Secret Santa (30 Rock) =

- 30 Rock episode
- Episode no.: Season 4 Episode 8
- Directed by: Beth McCarthy-Miller
- Written by: Tina Fey
- Production code: 408
- Original air date: December 10, 2009

Guest appearances
- Cheyenne Jackson as Danny; Julianne Moore as Nancy; Larry Wilcox as himself

Episode chronology
← Previous "Dealbreakers Talk Show #0001"	Next → "Klaus and Greta"
- 30 Rock season 4

"Secret Santa" is the eighth episode of the fourth season of the American television comedy series 30 Rock, and the 66th overall episode of the series. The episode was written by series' creator Tina Fey and directed by Beth McCarthy-Miller. It originally aired on NBC in the United States on December 10, 2009. The episode featured appearances by actors Cheyenne Jackson as Danny Baker, Julianne Moore as Nancy Donovan, and Larry Wilcox playing himself.

The episode centered on a gift-giving contest between Liz Lemon (Tina Fey) and Jack Donaghy (Alec Baldwin), Jenna Maroney's (Jane Krakowski) jealousy over new TGS with Tracy Jordan cast member Danny Baker's (Jackson) singing skills, and the writers—Frank Rossitano (Judah Friedlander), James "Toofer" Spurlock (Keith Powell), and J. D. Lutz (John Lutz)—coming up with a fake religion to get out of NBC page Kenneth Parcell's (Jack McBrayer) "Secret Santa" scheme.

Critical reception of the episode was generally less than favorable. According to the Nielsen ratings system, "Secret Santa" was watched by 7.54 million households during its original broadcast. The night the episode premiered, it was immediately preceded by an episode of The Office with the same title.

== Plot ==
Jack and Liz decide to exchange gifts for Christmas. Meanwhile, Jack reconnects with a friend from high school, Nancy Donovan (Julianne Moore), and ponders the possibility of romance as Nancy's marriage is falling apart. When Liz ends up buying an expensive necktie that Jack already owns, they agree to spend zero dollars on their gifts. Jack gets Liz a program from her performance of The Crucible framed in wood from her high school stage — and does not reimburse his office assistant, Jonathan (Maulik Pancholy) for fuel costs. In return, Liz calls in a bomb threat to Penn Station, keeping Nancy in New York, and finally Jack arranges for Liz to fulfill her dream of meeting Larry Wilcox as Officer Jon Baker from the show CHiPs.

TGS producer Pete Hornberger (Scott Adsit) learns that the new actor on the show, Danny, is a talented singer. Despite Danny's lack of interest in singing on the show, Pete gives him the Christmas solo as revenge for Jenna not chipping in to tip the cleaning ladies, which is a yearly source of frustration for Pete. Jenna is outraged when she hears Danny was assigned the solo, and tries to get Subhas the janitor to punch Danny in the throat. But when the agreeable Danny learns of Jenna's hurt feelings, he arranges for them to perform a duet, in which he sings off-key to make Jenna look good.

Meanwhile, Kenneth is throwing his rule-filled "Secret Santa Fun Swap", much to the writers' chagrin. Frank, Toofer, and Lutz proclaim they are strict adherents of "Verdukianism," a religion they make up on the spot, and have Kenneth give them things they claim to need for "Merlinpeen," the Verdukian Holiday of Mouth Pleasures (such as meat-lover's pizza and having their teeth flossed by a blonde virgin). Their famous holiday song is, "Oh, Meatbowl of Verduke, you bring me such pizza. Meatbowl." When Tracy Jordan (Tracy Morgan) tells Kenneth that they made up their religion, he goes into shock at the idea that all religions are made up by man. His faith is restored when the three are arrested for the bomb threat Liz called in, using their phone.

== Production ==
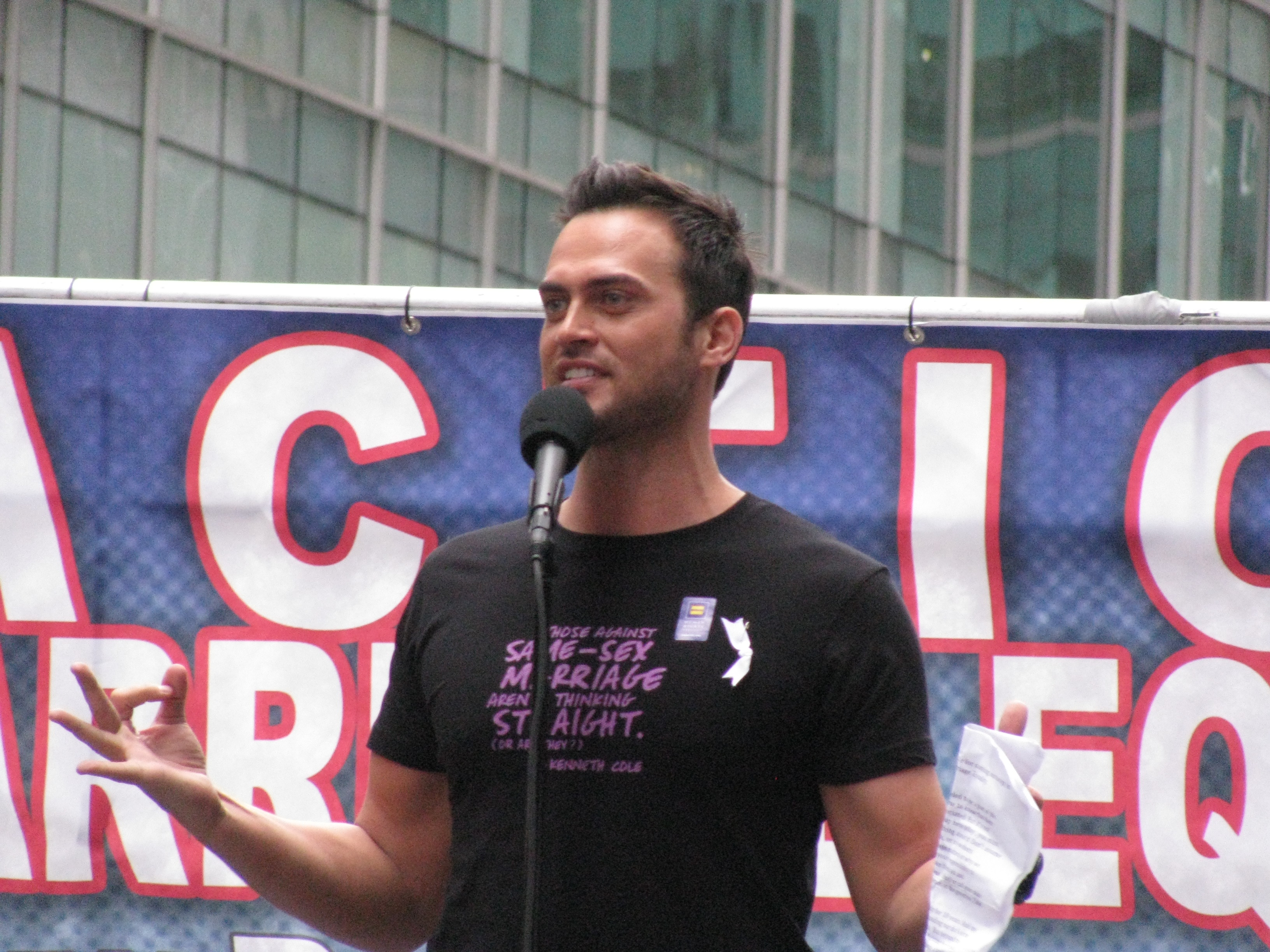
Cheyenne Jackson made his second appearance as Danny Baker in "Secret Santa".

"Secret Santa" was written by series' creator, executive producer and lead actress Tina Fey. The director of this episode was Beth McCarthy-Miller, a long-time television director who worked with Fey on the sketch comedy show Saturday Night Live. This was Fey's nineteenth writing credit, and McCarthy-Miller's ninth directed episode. "Secret Santa" originally aired on NBC as the eighth episode of the show's fourth season, and the 66th overall episode of the series, in the United States on December 10, 2009. It was filmed on November 5 and November 20, 2009.

In November 2009, it was announced that actress Julianne Moore would guest star on 30 Rock as a love interest for Alec Baldwin's character, Jack Donaghy. Moore would later guest star in the episodes "Winter Madness", "Lee Marvin vs. Derek Jeter", "Emanuelle Goes to Dinosaur Land", and "I Do Do". In an interview with USA Today in October 2009, Fey said that Jack would find more enduring love in the upcoming season. "As we move into the back half of the season, we'd like to get [Jack] into a real adult relationship with some hurdles." In the same interview, Baldwin noted, "Fifty-year-old Jack running around still using women like a drug is not where I'd like him to end up." Actor Larry Wilcox made a cameo in this episode, though, he was in character playing Officer Jon Baker from his old days in the drama show CHiPs, as Liz Lemon had a teen crush on Wilcox. In one scene of this episode, Liz says "shark farts", and when asked about it in an April 2010 interview, Fey revealed that the term "was one that we ad-libbed that we ended up leaving in. The studio asked us not to leave it in, but we left it in."

This was actor Cheyenne Jackson's second appearance as Danny on 30 Rock. He made his debut in the November 12, 2009, episode "The Problem Solvers". Fey had seen Jackson in the Broadway musicals Xanadu and Damn Yankees, the latter that starred Jane Krakowski, who plays Jenna Maroney on the show. According to Jackson in a November 2009 interview, Fey set up a meeting to interest him in a role on the program. In an interview with the Los Angeles Times, it was revealed that it was Krakowski who brought Jackson to the attention of the 30 Rock producers. In the episode, Danny sang off-key during a duet with Jenna, in order to keep her happy. In regards of his off-pitch performance, Jackson said in an interview, "It's actually harder than you might think. I worked on it a lot to make it sound real and to make it sound believable. But I got some good, funny feedback from it, so I'm glad it worked out."

One filmed scene from "Secret Santa" was cut out from the airing. Instead, the scene was featured on 30 Rock's season four DVD as part of the deleted scenes in the Bonus feature. In the scene, Liz goes to Vattene, a men's dress apparel retailer. She is there to buy a gift for Jack for Christmas but is shocked at the prices. She then sees a red neck tie and purchases it.

== Cultural references ==
Jack tells Liz about YouFace, "an up-and-coming social-networking site", similar to that of MySpace and Facebook. The song Liz sings for Jack's Christmas gift is a parody of the song "Anyone Else but You" originally by The Moldy Peaches featured in the film Juno. Liz revealed that she played John Proctor "in a gender-blind" high school production of The Crucible. In one scene of "Secret Santa", Kenneth has multiple arrangements of multicultural holiday decorations in his desk page, which includes a portrait of U.S. President Barack Obama "for the Muslims". Jack promises actor Larry Wilcox an appearance on the reality show Dancing with the Stars if he visits Liz, until she tells him that the show airs on ABC. When Danny figures out sarcasm, he turns to the camera and says, "That went well", which Rick Mercer does in most episodes of the Canadian sitcom Made in Canada.

== Reception ==
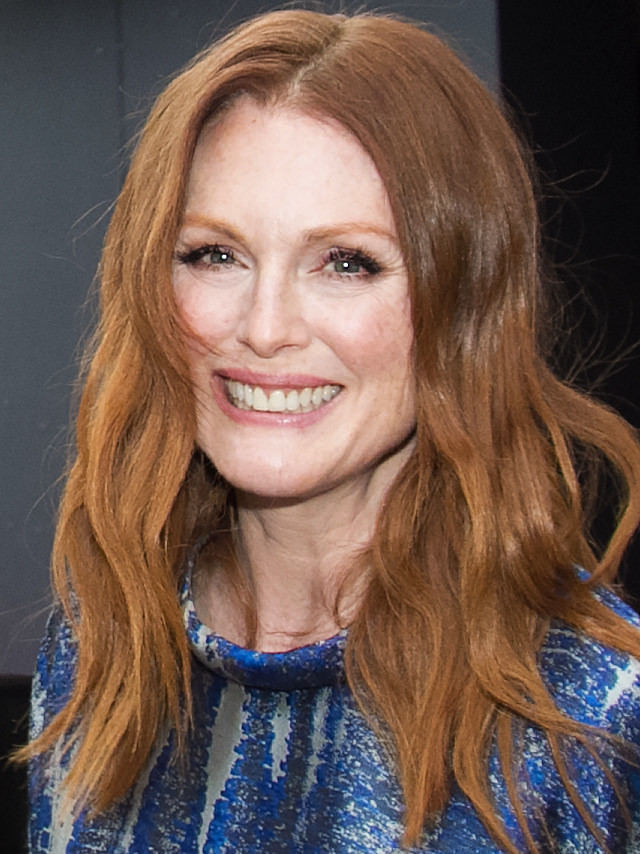
Julianne Moore's appearance on the show was appreciated by critics.

According to the Nielsen ratings system, "Secret Santa" was watched by 7.54 million households in its original American broadcast. It earned a 3.5 rating/9 share in the 18–49 demographic, the season high in the 18–49 rating. This means that it was seen by 3.5% of all 18- to 49-year-olds, and 9% of all 18- to 49-year-olds watching television at the time of the broadcast. ABC had an all-repeat evening on December 10, 2009, which helped increase numbers for the other networks. The night this episode broadcast, it was immediately preceded by an episode of The Office—another NBC program—with the same title.

Critical reception of the episode was not entirely favorable. Nathan Rabin of The A.V. Club noted a general decline in the show's quality in the fourth season, and after a return to form in its previous episode, "Dealbreakers Talk Show #0001", he found "Secret Santa" disappointing, and gave it a grade B−. "It was cute and nicely plotted", he wrote "but it felt a little rote and familiar." IGN contributor Robert Canning was more positively inclined. He appreciated Julianne Moore's appearance, but he found that some of the story lines, "though sprinkled with funny moments, were more successful as sweet tales made for the holiday." Bob Sassone of AOL's TV Squad was glad to see Cheyenne Jackson's Danny back on 30 Rock, and noted that the plots concerning Jack and Nancy and Kenneth and the TGS writers, respectively, were "home runs". He liked that Tina Fey's character Liz "was more of a supporting player" in "Secret Santa". Sassone also enjoyed Moore's appearance on the show, commenting that she was "wicked good" as Jack's new love interest. Entertainment Weekly's Margaret Lyons wrote that this episode "had some awesome Liz/Jack moments, a nice little storyline for Pete and Danny, and the invention of a whole new pizza-loving religion."

Meredith Blake, writing for the Los Angeles Times, found that television Christmas episodes generally tended to bring "an awkward shift in tone: All of a sudden, everyone's being nice to each other." She also complained about the invented holiday, which she found to be an overused cliché of Christmas programming: "See also: 'Chrismukkah' or 'Festivus.'" Also, television columnist Alan Sepinwall for The Star-Ledger found that the episode compared unfavorably with the preceding one, but still enjoyed the showcasing of several minor characters, and the "tender holiday spirit". What he appreciated most of all, however, was the Alec Baldwin–Julianne Moore angle. Mark Graham of New York magazine opined that the three plots in "Secret Santa" could not be considered as "A-material" for 30 Rock. Michael Anthony for TV Guide worried about the kiss between Jack and Nancy, as Nancy is married, and experiencing marital troubles. "The Nancy kiss kind of troubles me; is Jack going to become the 'other woman?'"
