= Andrés Duque =

Colombian American gay rights activist

Andrés Duque is a Colombian American gay rights activist, journalist, and award-winning blogger. He is best known for his blog Blabbeando, where he discusses LGBT politics, culture, and daily life in New York City and around the world. He is also well known for his advocacy for human rights. Duque lives in Jackson Heights, Queens, New York City.

== Life and achievements ==
Andrés Duque moved with his family at a young age from Colombia to the United States. In 1996 he co-founded the Colombian Lesbian and Gay Association, or COLEGA, with Daniel Castellanos. For many years he worked at the Latino Commission on AIDS and directed Mano a Mano, a coalition of Latino and Latina lesbian, gay, bisexual, and transgender activists; Mano a Mano is best known as an informative electronic mailing list or "listserv" that forwards articles that appear around the world (but especially in Latin America) about LGBT issues. Daniel Hendrick has described Mano a Mano as "bringing together 15 gay Latino groups and 400-plus activists to share information--including job listings and legislative updates--on the web." Duque was especially involved in activism related to the murder of the gay Colombian Eddie Garzón on August 15, 2001, in Jackson Heights, demanding that the New York City Police investigate this case as a hate crime. He is also a founding member of the Audre Lorde Project and of the Out People of Color Political Action Club. Duque is one of the most visible leaders involved in queer people of color issues in New York City and has gained additional renown due to his interviews with leading personalities such as Michael Musto. He was profiled in the June 2012 episode of In the Life titled "Orgullo Latino" (Latino Pride).

== Awards ==
Duque was one of the honorees at a ceremony held by New York City Comptroller William C. Thompson, Jr. on Thursday, June 15, 2006, as part of that year's Lesbian, Gay, Bisexual and Transgender Pride Celebration. The event was co-hosted by the Empire State Pride Agenda and Gay Men's Health Crisis.

== See also ==
- LGBT social movements
- List of gay, lesbian or bisexual people
