= The Problem Solvers =

- 30 Rock episode
- Episode no.: Season 4 Episode 5
- Directed by: John Riggi
- Written by: Ron Weiner
- Production code: 405
- Original air date: November 12, 2009

Guest appearances
- Josh Fadem as Simon Behrens; Cheyenne Jackson as Jack "Danny" Baker; Padma Lakshmi as herself; Shawn Levy as Scottie Shofar

Episode chronology
← Previous "Audition Day"	Next → "Sun Tea"
- 30 Rock season 4

"The Problem Solvers" is the fifth episode of the fourth season of the American television comedy series 30 Rock, and the 63rd overall episode of the series. It was written by co-executive producer Ron Weiner and directed by co-executive producer John Riggi. It originally aired on NBC in the United States on November 12, 2009. Guest stars in the episode include Josh Fadem, Cheyenne Jackson, Padma Lakshmi, and Shawn Levy.

In the episode, the new cast member for the fictional sketch comedy show The Girlie Show with Tracy Jordan (TGS), Jack "Danny" Baker (Jackson) arrives on set and learns the intricacies of the show. Meanwhile, Jack Donaghy (Alec Baldwin) offers Liz Lemon (Tina Fey) a chance to create a television pilot based on her "Dealbreakers" sketch but Liz decides to search for other offers. In addition, after offering some advice Tracy Jordan (Tracy Morgan) and Jenna Maroney (Jane Krakowski) decide to solve other problems of the cast and crew. Finally, NBC page Kenneth Parcell (Jack McBrayer) grows annoyed as the cast members begin to ask less of him.

"The Problem Solvers" received generally positive reception from television critics, although some expressed disappointment in the tone. According to the Nielsen ratings system, the episode was watched by 5.8 million households during its original broadcast, and received a 2.9 rating/7 share among viewers in the 18–49 demographic.

== Plot ==
This episode opens with Liz Lemon, Jack Donaghy, and the rest of the TGS with Tracy Jordan staff welcoming Jack Baker, the new cast member, to the show. After realizing that Baker has the same first name as him, Jack quickly decides to rename him Danny. In the previous episode, Danny was hired by Jack from his work as a street performer who dressed up like a robot and had very limited recent experience with "real acting".

Meanwhile, Jack offers Liz the chance to star in a new television pilot based on her "Dealbreakers" sketch. She is initially excited, but Tracy Jordan and Jenna Maroney convince her to test the market and search for other offers before agreeing to work with Jack. Liz signs with a talent agent (Josh Fadem) to explore other options, but later learns he is a low-level agent. Jack cannot stand Liz's dismissal of him, and as a result, he announces through the media that NBC is moving forward with the pilot's production and calls in Padma Lakshmi as a potential new host in place of Liz. Liz threatens to sue Jack and NBC for the rights to "Dealbreakers", but Jack informs her that NBC owns the rights to it. Liz takes a meeting with Sports Shouting producer, Scottie Shofar (Shawn Levy), and Jack meets with Padma. During their respective meetings, however, the two realize that they should work with one another. They shake hands at the end of the episode, agreeing to create the pilot together.

After giving advice to Liz, Tracy and Jenna spend the episode calling themselves "The Problem Solvers" giving the TGS crew advice on their lives. From the moment he arrives, Danny treats NBC page Kenneth Parcell politely and does not ask him to run any errands for him, a break from how Tracy and Jenna treat him. Danny explains to the two that lower-level people such as pages often rise up to positions where they would be the boss of actors such as themselves, and as a result, he is polite to avoid building bad relationships with potential future bosses. Danny even speculates that Kenneth could be running the network someday. Jenna initially dismisses the idea out-of-hand, but Tracy becomes concerned, and tells Kenneth that he doesn't want him to perform any more menial tasks for him; Jenna soon joins him. Meanwhile, Kenneth lets slip that he may have been alive forever. Kenneth becomes upset that he is losing his responsibilities and confronts Danny, driving him to yell at Kenneth. Danny, who is Canadian, has had a hard time pronouncing the word "about", but after yelling at Kenneth, and saying "about" without his Canadian accent, thanks Kenneth for helping him.

== Production ==
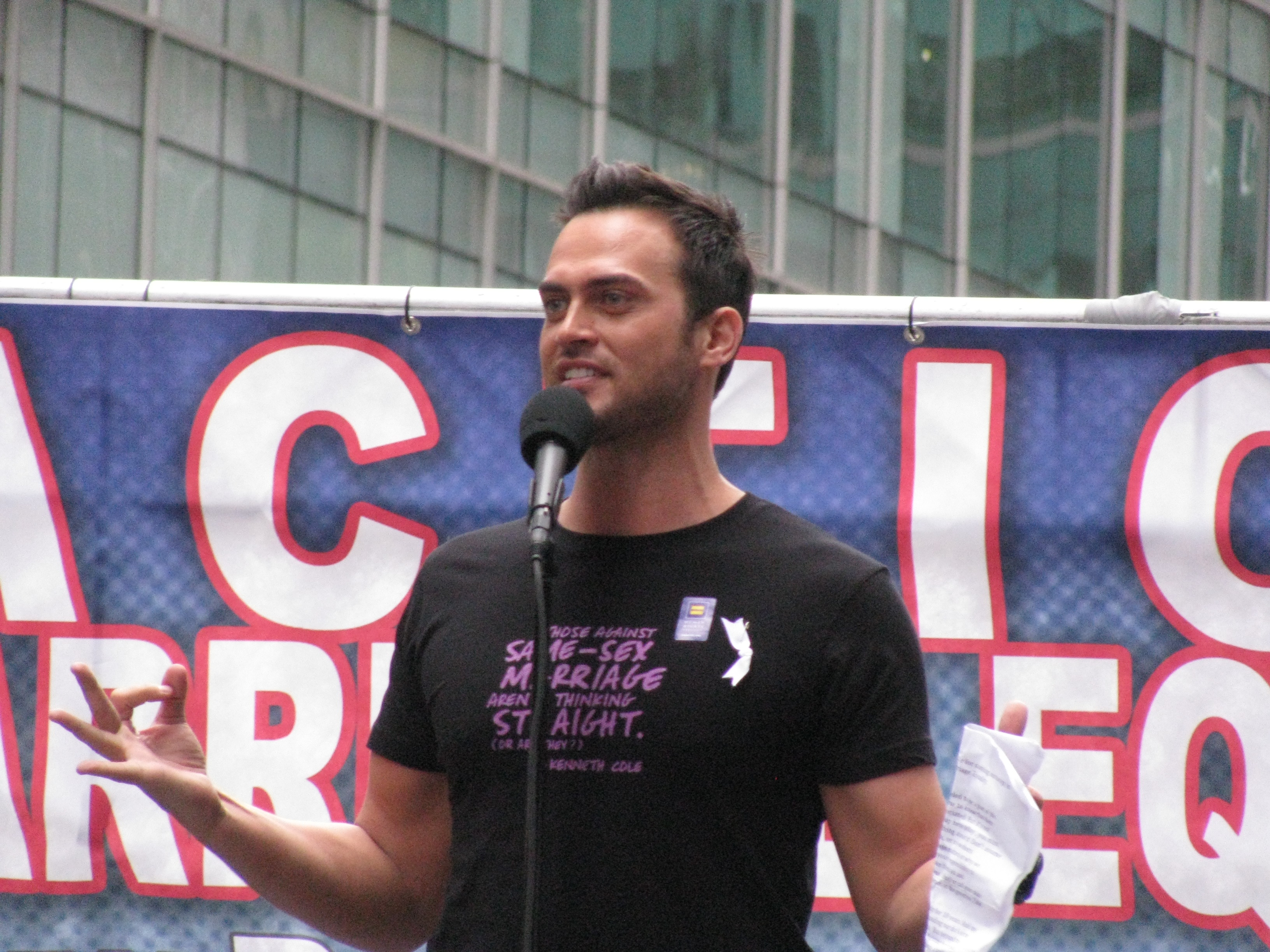
Cheyenne Jackson made his 30 Rock debut as Danny Baker in "The Problem Solvers".

"The Problem Solvers" was written by Ron Weiner and directed by John Riggi, both co-executive producers on 30 Rock. This episode was Weiner's fifth writing credit, having penned "Secrets and Lies", "Señor Macho Solo", "Goodbye, My Friend", and "Mamma Mia", and was Riggi's second directed episode, having helmed "Goodbye My Friend" in the show's third season. "The Problem Solvers" originally aired in the United States on November 12, 2009, on NBC as the fifth episode of the show's fourth season and the 63rd overall episode of the series.

"The Problem Solvers" was filmed on October 23, October 28, and October 29, 2009. Jack Donaghy hiring the robot street performer in the previous episode, "Audition Day", was first introduced in the fourth season premiere episode "Season 4", in which Jack explains that the TGS staff have become too elitist and need to change to survive in tough economic times, and informs Liz Lemon—the head writer on TGS—to begin searching for a new cast member to help lessen this elitist image. In this episode, the robot street performer is introduced to the TGS crew as Danny Baker, and was played by actor Cheyenne Jackson, who made his 30 Rock debut with this episode. Series creator, executive producer and lead actress Tina Fey had seen Jackson in the Broadway musicals Xanadu and Damn Yankees, the latter that starred Jane Krakowski, who plays Jenna Maroney on the show. According to Jackson in a November 2009 interview, Fey set up a meeting to interest him in a role on the program. In an interview with the Los Angeles Times, it was revealed that it was Krakowski who brought Jackson to the attention of the 30 Rock producers. In "Audition Day", Jackson did not play the robot, instead actor Daniel Genalo played the character.

The actor Josh Fadem played an inexperienced agent that Liz signs with in the episode. In a November 2009 interview with Tulsa World, Fadem admitted to "[flubbing] a couple lines" during filming, but that no one on the set "made me feel bad." Director Shawn Levy guest starred in the episode as Scottie Shofar, a producer for the show Sports Shouting, and who Liz has a meeting with in regards to her "Dealbreakers" talk show. Levy directed Fey in the 2010 comedy film Date Night.

== Cultural references ==
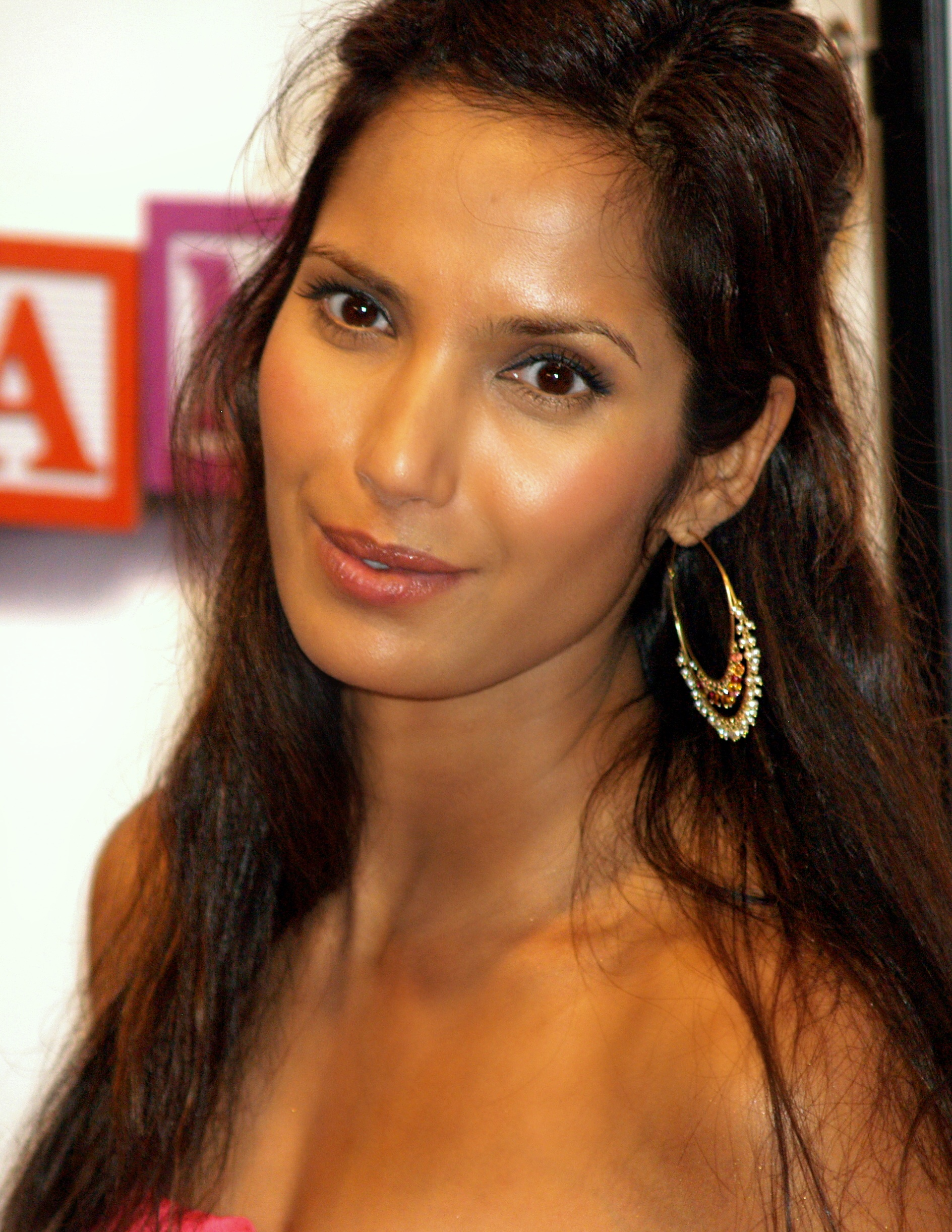
Padma Lakshmi, host of Top Chef, made a cameo as a potential replacement for Liz Lemon on a "Dealbreakers" pilot

During Danny's rallying speech in a football movie flashback, he makes several references to Canadian culture such as Boxing Day and the different rules used between Canadian and American football (e.g. 3 downs instead of 4, 12 men per side instead of 11, though incorrectly uses meters while Canadian football uses yards). The episode twice refers to a fictional show Sports Shouting which features four panelists yelling at each other about sports. Some reviewers noted the similarity to the real show Around the Horn, an ESPN program which also features four panelists discussing sports in a competitive setting. J. A. Adande, a frequent panelist on Around the Horn, said through his Twitter page "Sports Shouting now tops 'Werewolf Bar Mitzvah' as my favorite 30 Rock gag."

When Jack tells Liz that Padma Lakshmi is coming in for the pilot she says "Then who's going to host Top Chef? You're ruining my life!" referring to a cooking reality television show Lakshmi hosts which Liz had previously shown a taste for in the season two episode "Cougars". Tracy reveals that early in his career he signed a very badly structured contract which requires he publicize "Wade Boggs Carpet World" five times whenever he appears on camera, a reference to the baseball player Wade Boggs. Later, Jenna reveals that Scottie Shofar was her assistant in Trivial Pursuit: The Movie. The latter is a board game in which progress is determined by a player's ability to answer general knowledge and popular culture questions. As Danny grew angry he described Kenneth as having a "weird Don Knotts face" and a "Hitler Youth haircut."

This was the fourth time the show referenced Liz's "Dealbreakers" story arc. This first began in the third season episode "Mamma Mia", in which Liz had written a comedy sketch titled "Dealbreakers", and in the sketch, Jenna doled out comedic catchphrases as relationship advice to other women such as "If he wears an Atlanta Falcons jersey to your sister's wedding? That's a Dealbreaker, ladies!" Liz tried gaining attention for writing the sketch, but Jenna took all the credit for it, thus making Liz jealous. Liz dispensed more "Dealbreaker"-style romantic advice in a talk show appearance in the episode "Kidney Now!" and at the end of the episode Liz told Jack that she had signed a book deal based on the sketch. In the episode "Into the Crevasse", Liz's book is published, but receives backlash from men close to her, as they believe her advice damaged their relationships. In this 30 Rock episode, Jack offers Liz a chance to create a television pilot based on her "Dealbreakers" sketch and although Liz decides to search for other offers she ultimately decides to work on the pilot with Jack.

== Reception ==
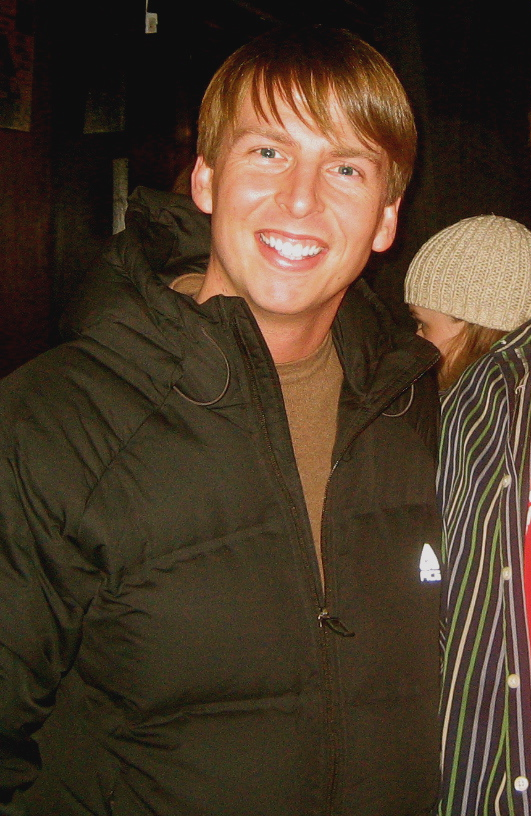
Margaret Lyons of Entertainment Weekly enjoyed Jack McBrayer's (pictured) performance.

In its original American broadcast, "The Problem Solvers" was watched by 5.8 million households, according to the Nielsen ratings system. It received a 2.9 rating/7 share among viewers in the 18–49 demographic, that is 2.9 percent of all people in that group, and 7 percent of all people from that group watching television at the time, watched the episode. This was a decrease from the previous episode, "Audition Day", which was watched by 5.9 million American viewers.

"The Problem Solvers" received generally positive reviews. Robert Canning of IGN reviewed the episode, giving it a 7.4 out of 10 rating and opining the episode had "a few audible chuckles and several silent smiles", and that the tone of it "was just off." He cited that the Liz and Jack characters on opposing sides "was not as much fun as seeing them working together", and that Jenna and Tracy's antics throughout the series have been "funny most of the time", though "very little clicked in this episode." Television columnist Alan Sepinwall of The Star-Ledger said that the Tracy and Jenna team "often seems too far out of the realm of reality ... to enjoy them." Sepinwall was positive about Cheyenne Jackson's debut, noting he "fit in well his first time out." Sean Gandert of Paste magazine called the episode the "best so far in the season" but admitted he was "disappointed in it" for not coming "close to greatness and we all know [30 Rock's] done it before and can do it again." Gandert, who has not been a fan of Liz's "Dealbreakers" storyline, commented her plot here was "somewhat annoying, generally not that interesting", and concluded "it's hard to really care" that Liz get her talk show.

Bob Sassone of AOL's TV Squad noted that he liked how Jack and Liz interacted throughout the episode, and enjoyed their meeting at the Rockefeller Center at the end. The A.V. Club's Nathan Rabin was complimentary towards "The Problem Solvers", reporting it was better than the past four episodes, and writing it had "alternating currents of competition and collaboration, hostility and affection and love and hate" that, according to Rabin, define Jack and Liz's relationship. Rabin gave the episode a B grade rating. Entertainment Weekly contributor Margaret Lyons deemed this 30 Rock episode as the best work from Jack McBrayer's Kenneth. "If there's been a better episode for Kenneth in 30 Rock history, I'd love to know: From the backwards-talking to the bizarre fury, this was Jack McBrayer's finest (half) hour." Nick Catucci of New York magazine wrote that this was a "fine" episode "with Jenna and Tracy in classic dopey-duo form and a couple of great fantasy bits ... But the Jack, Liz, and Jenna triangle felt like the funniest-ever Three's Company episode squeezed into a couple of minutes." Meredith Blake, a contributor for the Los Angeles Times, said that she was looking forward to Lakshmi's cameo, but after the airing, "her scene fell a little flat." In regards to the episode, itself, Blake said it was "a solid if not mind-blowing episode, even with the presence of [Lakshmi]."
