= Jenna Maroney =

Fictional character on 30 Rock

- 30 Rock character
- Jenna Maroney
- First appearance: "Pilot" (2006)
- Last appearance: "30 Rock: A One-Time Special" (2020)
- Created by: Tina Fey
- Portrayed by: Jane Krakowski

Jenna Maroney (born Yustrepa Gronkowitz; February 24, 1969) is a fictional character on the American television series 30 Rock, played by Jane Krakowski.

For her portrayal of Maroney, Krakowski was nominated four times for the Primetime Emmy Award for Outstanding Supporting Actress in a Comedy Series, and also received seven Screen Actors Guild Award nominations, winning one.

== Character development ==
In Tina Fey's original pilot script for 30 Rock, Jenna was named "Jenna DeCarlo", and The Girlie Show was titled Friday Night Bits with Jenna DeCarlo. In the unaired pilot for the show, Rachel Dratch, a former SNL cast member, played the role of Jenna. In August 2006, executive producer Lorne Michaels announced that Dratch would be replaced as Jenna. Later in the month, NBC announced that Krakowski had replaced Dratch, and that the character was renamed "Jenna Maroney".

Krakowski was credited as a main cast member, and the character appeared in all but 10 episodes.

== Fictional biography ==
Jenna was born Yustrepa Gronkowitz on February 24, 1969 in Tampa, FL, and grew up in Bakersfield, CA. In "The Return of Avery Jessup", however, Jenna mentions being from "Toilet Swamp Cove" in the Florida Panhandle. She also is revealed to have a strong Southern accent that she suppresses. In "Queen of Jordan 2: Mystery of the Phantom Pooper", it was revealed that she was conceived in a Florida bathroom. Jenna says that the day she was born her mother was chain-smoking on a curb. Her ethnic origin is that of an Ashkenazi Jew (with an extra Y chromosome), as revealed through a DNA sample, which Jack mistakenly thought belonged to Kaylie Hooper. Jenna's father, Werner (or possibly Travis) Maroney was a burger server in suburban Santa Barbara, before leaving her mother, Verna (Jan Hooks), for a "curly-haired surfer" named Roberta — which hurt her. In "Secret Santa", she reveals to Jack "Danny" Baker that her mother forced her to sit on every mall Santa's lap in Bakersfield in an attempt to find him. As a young girl, Jenna competed in child pageants and was on Weight Watchers at age six (though the math was too much and she eventually turned to cigarettes). She performed Christmas carols inside Sears as a distraction while her mother shoplifted. Jenna's entire church group was eaten by a bear, which Jenna witnesses while playing dead. It is mentioned that she has a sister who died (and that Jenna felt pushed aside and forgotten at her funeral).

Jenna did not attend her high school reunion because the boat she was educated on sank. It is mentioned that her college was tipped over by Miami Heat fans, that she quit fashion school, and that she spent $500 on Adrien Brody's unaccredited acting school. Jenna was trained in stage acting and game show pointing at the Royal Tampa Academy of Dramatic Tricks, where she studied theatre superstition and majored in prom queens and murdered runaways (mentioned in "Black Light Attack"). Jenna also studied voice at Northwestern University where she first met Liz Lemon in 1993.

Jenna's many dysfunctional relationships are referenced throughout the series. She dated a boy in a fraternity when she was twelve years old (possibly a reference to National Lampoon's Animal House). At age sixteen, Jenna was engaged to a congressman. As an adult she was later engaged to David Blaine. She mentioned that she lost her virginity to a boat salesman on a water bed. She has dated or had relations with: a sniper (who threatened to kill her but Jenna says he was just bluffing because he couldn't face his mother, let alone kill someone), O. J. Simpson, a music producer (hinted at having been Red One), Kevin Federline, Ed Begley Jr., Dog the Bounty Hunter, and a mob boss. She has been in at least two three-ways, one with Tom and Roseanne Arnold (long after the couple was divorced), and another with two of the Backstreet Boys, in which she claimed she was "not really necessary." Jenna also claimed to have had a relationship with Mickey Rourke, and his over-the-top attempts at killing her (by catapulting her into the Hollywood sign, throwing her onto the field during the Super Bowl, with a double-edged sword, etc.) are a recurring joke on the series. However, in the series finale, she breaks the fourth wall and tells the audience that she has never actually met Rourke; despite this, in the episode "Murphy Brown Lied to Us", Rourke does actually try to kill her by sending her a flower bouquet full of spiders, which instead land on Tracy.

Jenna's husband Paul L'astname (Will Forte) is a "gender dysmorphic bi-genitalia pansexual" and a professional female impersonator most renowned for his performances as Jenna. She met him at a Jenna Maroney impersonator contest in which she came in fourth and he placed first. Before they were married it was revealed that she is so attracted to him because he gives her the opportunity to date herself. Throughout the series, during their relationship they are shown performing various, unusual sexual acts and rituals.

== Fictional career ==
Jenna started off in theater, notably in Pippin; despite co-star Irene Ryan dying on stage, Jenna continued performing anyway (as revealed in "Live Show"). Later performances included The Jenna Chronicles: A One-Wormy Show in 1996 and Con Air: The Musical in 1997, where she appears to have played Rachel Ticotin's character. She was nominated for a Cable ACE Award for her work on HBO Arliss. She appeared for three episodes on the show Night Court as a werewolf lawyer named Sparky Monroe and is blamed by the cast for leading to the show's cancellation. She also appeared in an episode of Law & Order as a "lady rapist" and from a poster in her dressing room, had also starred in a production of the Broadway musical Evita. Jenna also starred in a pilot for a police drama named Good Looking, in which she played the protagonist Alexis Goodlooking, whose special skill was being good at looking for clues.

Jenna was the star of The Girlie Show, a sketch comedy series that was created by her friend Liz Lemon. Jenna's star billing is reduced drastically when Jack Donaghy is hired as a new network vice president and brings in Tracy Jordan, a popular but unpredictable actor. Jack further decides that Tracy is a higher priority than Jenna, so he orders the show's title change to TGS with Tracy Jordan. This makes Jenna furious because she is no longer the star of the show, and believed that Liz gave in to Jack's demands. In addition she finds herself at the mercy of Tracy's antics, the writing staff's constant pranks, and Jack's constant avoidance of her (his reason is that she is not promotable for the show). But, despite all this, Liz assures Jenna that her future on the show is safe (Lemon forces Jack to sign a contract stating he will never fire Jenna in the pilot).

When she is not working on TGS, Jenna stars in a series of low-budget films, including her first starring role, The Rural Juror, written by John Grisham's brother Kevin; Take My Hand, a romantic comedy that went through so many re-writes that it became a torture porn film, Jackie Jormp-Jomp, a biopic based on the life of Janis Joplin, in which Joplin's name and music could not be used for legal reasons; Trivial Pursuit: The Movie, a movie based on the board game, in which Jenna portrayed Arts & Leisure; and Nightstalkers, a werewolf film to be shot in Iceland that had production shut down when the producers realized that the movie had to be shot at night and Iceland only had one minute of darkness per day. Jenna also played Avery Jessup in Kidnapped by Danger, a made-for-TV movie about Jack's wife Avery (Elizabeth Banks), who was being held prisoner in North Korea. Jenna proudly announced at Jack and Avery's would-be vow renewal/divorcing ceremony, that Kidnapped by Danger was now available on Sega Genesis. Jenna was banned for life from the Golden Globe Awards after trying to bribe the Hollywood Foreign Press Association into giving her an award for the Lifetime TV movie Sister, Can You Spare a Breast? She also played a criminal profiler named Jill St. Ferrari in an original Lifetime miniseries, Hushed Rapings.

Jenna is also a singer and possibly a rapper, having once participated in a Gangsta rap contest. She has been a somewhat successful pop star overseas, with one of her hits, "Muffin Top", reaching number one in Israel and number four in Belgium. In the fourth season premiere, Jenna decided that she needed to "go country" to help her career, and in a promotion for NBC's tennis coverage, she made her country debut with the single "Tennis Night In America." During the sixth season, Jenna was a judge on the singing talent competition show America's Kids' Got Singing. In season seven, Jenna comes out with a hit song called "I Caught Crabs in Paradise," which attracts many fans from Florida, who called themselves "Crab Catchers". Liz and Jack realize that, since Florida is the swing state in the 2012 election and almost everyone in Florida is loyal to Jenna, Jenna could be the one to decide whether Barack Obama or Mitt Romney is voted president. They subsequently try to sway Jenna's vote (Jack lobbying for Romney and Liz for Obama). In season seven, Jenna has a hit single, "Balls", which despite extensive airplay, she is outraged to discover earned her very little money due to music piracy.

Jenna also performs on stage, once appearing in Mystic Pizza: The Musical, an off-Broadway musical version of the film Mystic Pizza. As her role required her to eat 32 slices of pizza on stage each week, Jenna gained a large amount of weight at this time. She took advantage of it, however, by becoming a spokesmodel for Enormé, a perfume for plus-sized women that had the slogan "Enormé: Make him chase the chunk." The writers of TGS also took advantage of Jenna's weight gain, writing plus-sized sketches and giving her a catchphrase, "Me want food!" Eventually, Jack tells Jenna that on television an actress can't be "in between" fat and thin, so she has to either lose 30 pounds or gain 60, and Jenna loses the weight again.

After the cancellation of TGS, Jenna decides to become a dramatic actress, starting with a guest spot on Law & Order: Special Victims Unit. However, after learning that she would only play a corpse, Jenna gives up that dream and takes her career to Los Angeles, but immediately leaves after seeing how many beautiful younger women live there. Ultimately, she reveals plans to star in a Broadway musical version of The Rural Juror, and sings the musical's main theme at the finale of TGS (and 30 Rock). It is revealed that a year later, Jenna will force her way on stage to claim the Tony Award for Best Actress in a Musical, despite her name not being called and Alice Ripley being the real winner.
