= 7th Indie Series Awards =

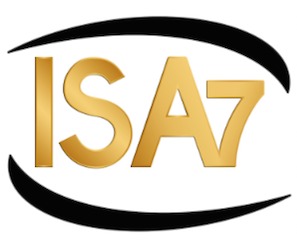
- Date: April 6, 2016
- Site: El Portal Theater, Los Angeles
- Hosted by: Eric Martsolf and Jen Lilley

Highlights
- Most nominations: Winterthorne (13)

The 7th Indie Series Awards were held on April 6, 2016 at the El Portal Theater in Los Angeles, with the ceremony hosted by Eric Martsolf and Jen Lilley. Presented by We Love Soaps, the awards recognize independently produced, scripted entertainment created for the web.

== Awards ==
The nominees were announced on February 3, 2016, with Winterthorne receiving a record-tying 13 nominations. The awards were given on April 6, 2016. Winners are listed first and highlighted in boldface:

**Best Web Series — Drama**: **Arthur**; The Banks; The Bay; BLACK; EastSiders; Winterthorne	**Best Web Series — Comedy**: **Keith Broke His Leg**; Capitol Hill; F'd; Hollywood Wasteland; Hunting Season; These People
**Best Directing — Drama**: **Adam Kosh, The Banks**; Nick Rusconi, Arthur; Gregori J. Martin, The Bay; Frank T. Ziede, BLACK; Jack Jewers, Night School; Sonia Blangiardo, Winterthorne	**Best Directing — Comedy**: **Behn Fannin, F'd**; Matt Newcomb & Caley Bisson, Hollywood Wasteland; Keith Powell, Keith Broke His Leg; Julian Stamboulieh, LARPs; Sebastian La Cause, Life's a Drag; Aleksander L. Nordaas, Made in Mosjøen
**Best Writing — Drama**: **Michael Caruso, Winterthorne**; Chloe de Souza & Nick Rusconi, Arthur; Adam Kosh & Ariane Bessette, The Banks; Adam Henry Garcia, Conversations From the Afterlife; Kit Williamson, EastSiders; CJ Daugherty, Night School	**Best Writing — Comedy**: **Zac Hug & Jim Rash, These People**; Ryan Gowland, F'd; Erika Robel, Fully Engaged; Jon Marcus, Hunting Season; Keith Powell, Keith Broke His Leg; Mai Spurlock & Kim Spurlock, Livin' The Dream
**Best Lead Actor — Drama**: **Adam Henry Garcia, Conversations From the Afterlife**; Kristos Andrews, The Southside; Van Hansis, EastSiders; Xavier Huard, The Banks; Ettore Nicoletti, Arthur; Kit Williamson, EastSiders	**Best Lead Actor — Comedy**: **Keith Powell, Keith Broke His Leg**; Ben Baur, Hunting Season; Willie Garson, Whole Day Down; Jeremy Glazer, These People; Ron Hanks, Golden California; Ian Verdun, Life's a Drag
**Best Lead Actress — Drama**: **Lilly Melgar, The Bay**; Brianna Brown, EastSiders; Tamieka Chavis, Anacostia; Kate Conway, Out with Dad; Martha Madison, Winterthorne; Chloe Rose, Teenagers	**Best Lead Actress — Comedy**: **Melissa Archer, Viral**; Laura Campbell, Livin' The Dream; Claire Downs, These People; Crista Flanagan, Club 5150; Jill Knox, Keith Broke His Leg; Amber Nash, Hart of America
**Best Supporting Actor — Drama**: **Raymond Ablack, Teenagers**; Johnny Alonso, Milgram and the Fastwalkers; Stephen Guarino, EastSiders; Aden Hakimi, Conversations From the Afterlife; Tristan Rogers, The Bay; Gordon Thomson, Winterthorne	**Best Supporting Actor — Comedy**: **Brennan Murray, The New Adventures of Peter and Wendy**; Barry Brisco, Viral; Christopher Chwee, Rare Birds of Fashion; James "Prince" Coley, The Beat & Path: Walk of Shame; John Cramer, He's With Me; David Starzyk, Cam Girls
**Best Supporting Actress — Drama**: **Jodie Hirst, Night School**; Tia Dae, Anacostia; Victoria Guthrie, Milgram and the Fastwalkers; Allyson Pratt, Teenagers; Miriam Pultro, Conversations From the Afterlife; Karrueche Tran, The Bay	**Best Supporting Actress — Comedy**: **Darcie Siciliano, He's With Me**; Stephanie Ray Glass, The Beat & Path: Walk of Shame; Carolyn Hennesy, These People; Ginifer King, Life's a Drag; Kathleen Littlefield, Redheads Anonymous; Paula Rhodes, Hollywood Wasteland
**Best Guest Actor — Drama**: **Kevin Spirtas, Winterthorne**; Willam Belli, EastSiders; Richard Beaumont, Shades of Bad; Jean-Jacques Javier, Wasted; John-Paul Lavoisier, Winterthorne; Eric Martsolf, The Bay	**Best Guest Actor — Comedy**: **Stephen Guarino, Life's a Drag**; Jim Beaver, The New Adventures of Peter and Wendy; Craig Cackowski, F'd; Hunter Parrish, Town Car Willie; Jim Rash, These People; Fred Willard, Hart of America
**Best Guest Actress — Drama**: **Kym Whitley, The Bay**; Kathleen Gati, Winterthorne; Linda Gray, Winterthorne; Elizabeth Hubbard, Anacostia; Patsy Pease, The Bay; Constance Wu, EastSiders	**Best Guest Actress — Comedy**: **Cady Huffman, He's With Me**; Emma Caulfield, HOARS; Melissa Claire Egan, Misguided; Deidre Hall, Club 5150; Alexandra Krosney, Keith Broke His Leg; Debra Jo Rupp, He's With Me
**Best Ensemble — Drama**: **EastSiders**; Anacostia; The Bay; Chancers; Teenagers; Winterthorne	**Best Ensemble — Comedy**: **Hunting Season**; Club 5150; CO-OPeration; He's With Me; Single and Dating in Vancouver; These People
**Best Original Song**: **"Happily Ever After," Or So the Story Goes (by Judith Avers)**; "Hold On To Your Heart," Hart of America (by Kevin Gillese, Chris Rittelmeyer & Benjamin Scott Holst); "Sooner or Later," Life of Matt (by Tim Bader); "All Alone, Brutus and Caesar," New Mayor of New York (by Ethan Slater & Isaac Jay); "Redheads Unite!" Redheads Anonymous (by Sam Carner & Derek Gregor); "Sexy, Suave, and Single," The Under 5ers (by Sami Horneff)	**Best Soundtrack**: **Brandon Russell & DJ Amen Ra, The Beat & Path: Walk of Shame**; Adam Henry Garcia, Conversations From the Afterlife; Grant Pavolka, Hunting Season; Frank Leone, In Retrospect; Julian Stamboulieh, LARPs; Judith Avers, Or So the Story Goes
**Best Original Score**: **Robb Padgett, Hollywood Wasteland**; Jason Chan, Bang Bang Club; Luke Wieting, BLACK; Amritha Vaz, Cam Girls; Michael Shlafman, LARPs; Connie Kaldor & Paul Campagne, Nikola Tesla and the End of the World	**Best Sound Design**: **Matt R. Sherman, LARPs**; Richard Hamilton, Conversations From the Afterlife; Dan Arthurs, Devolve; Robb Padgett, Hollywood Wasteland; Roman Chimienti & Jay Pellizzi, Hunting Season; Richard Sheehan, Keith Broke His Leg
**Best Special/Visual Effects**: **Jake Jarvi & Ryan Wolff, The Platoon of Power Squadron**; Andrew Lucas, BLACK; Adam Henry Garcia, Conversations From the Afterlife; Lumen Actus and 6360 Productions, Hollywood Wasteland; Andy Batson, Nature Show; Lyle Carroll, VTV	**Best Cinematography**: **Arnaud Dumas, The Banks**; Matthias Schubert, The Bay; Vincent Pierce, Capitol Hill; Matt Newcomb, Hollywood Wasteland; Tom Blount & John Collins, Night School; Rodolphe Portier, Winterthorne
**Best Editing**: **Julian Stamboulieh, LARPs**; Jason Chan & Christian Lee, Bang Bang Club; Larissa Brantner James & Kris Fitzgerald, EastSiders; Behn Fannin, F'd; Ryan Robert Daggitt, Hollywood Wasteland; Jack Jewers & Tom Blount, Night School	**Best Makeup**: **Erik Warren, Beth Harvey & Pakio Galore, Capitol Hill**; Ren Bray, The Bay; Tori McKelvey, Drty Diana; Sandra Solanchick, Hollywood Wasteland; Cathy Vincelli, LARPs; Jen Fregozo & James Freitas, Winterthorne
**Best Production Design**: **Michael Caruso & Barbara Caruso, Winterthorne**; Christopher Balder, Capitol Hill; Xin Wang, Ex-Model; Caley Bisson, Hollywood Wasteland; Christina Vincelli, LARPs; Katie Moest, The New Adventures of Peter and Wendy	**Best Costume Design**: **Zak Thriepland, LARPs**; Harmony Arnold & Pete Rush, Capitol Hill; Beth Newcomb & Linka Hovasapian, Hollywood Wasteland; Derya Derman, The New Adventures of Peter and Wendy; Lisette Areizaga, The Southside; Nir Shelter & Tai Scrivener, VTV
