= The Break-Up (30 Rock) =

- 30 Rock episode
- Episode no.: Season 1 Episode 8
- Directed by: Scott Ellis
- Written by: Brett Baer; Dave Finkel
- Production code: 109
- Original air date: December 14, 2006

Guest appearances
- Rachel Dratch as Pamela Smew; Chris Hansen as himself; Keith Powell as Toofer Spurlock; Lonny Ross as Josh Girard; Dean Winters as Dennis Duffy

Episode chronology
← Previous "Tracy Does Conan"	Next → "The Baby Show"
- 30 Rock season 1

"The Break-Up" is the eighth episode of the first season of the American television comedy series 30 Rock. It was written by co-executive producers Brett Baer and Dave Finkel, and directed by Scott Ellis. The episode originally aired on NBC in the United States on December 14, 2006. Guest stars in this episode include Rachel Dratch, Chris Hansen, Keith Powell, Lonny Ross, and Dean Winters.

In the episode, Liz Lemon (Tina Fey) finally dumps Dennis Duffy (Dean Winters) and prowls the singles scene, where she proves to be particularly inept at picking up guys, under Jenna Maroney's (Jane Krakowski) tutelage. Meanwhile, Tracy Jordan (Tracy Morgan) and James "Toofer" Spurlock (Keith Powell) clash, landing both in sensitivity training, and Jack Donaghy (Alec Baldwin) dates a certain "high-ranking African-American member of the Bush Administration."

== Plot ==
Liz Lemon (Tina Fey) comes home to find her wall full of knife holes, a Great Dane roaming her apartment, and a complete stranger on her bed, all courtesy of her boyfriend, Dennis Duffy (Dean Winters). She breaks up with him, but Dennis claims squatter's rights, so she gives him a week to move out. Liz and her friend, Jenna Maroney (Jane Krakowski), go out to try to pick up some men, but are very unsuccessful. The next day, Dennis walks into the staff office of TGS with Tracy Jordan, announcing he has found a new apartment and reads a heartfelt letter to Liz. The staff suddenly turns on Liz after Dennis walks out, and Jenna suggests to Liz that in light of the previous night's disaster, she should re-consider getting back together with him. She suggests making a list of pros and cons. Liz compiles her list of pros and cons. She marks down a positive remark after coming home to find that Dennis has cleaned up the apartment, put up shelves and a TV stand, and left her dinner. In the evening, Dennis returns with an early Christmas present for Liz. She invites him in, but soon sees Dennis on Dateline's To Catch a Predator. As a result of this, Liz breaks up with Dennis, and marks it down as a con.

Meanwhile, James "Toofer" Spurlock (Keith Powell) is upset that Tracy Jordan (Tracy Morgan) is cross-dressing on TGS because it is demeaning to African-Americans. After a bit of objection, Toofer convinces Tracy to stop, handing the female character over to Josh Girard (Lonny Ross). Once Josh's character is successful, Tracy is upset with Toofer. Liz convinces Toofer to work with Tracy. As they work together, Tracy gets upset with Toofer's supposed lack of blackness, and endearingly calls Toofer a racial slur. The next morning, Jack Donaghy (Alec Baldwin), Liz, Toofer, and Tracy sit down for a meeting about Tracy's vocabulary from the previous night. Tracy and Jack point out that the African-American community has adopted the word to deprive it of its meaning. In trying to reach out to Tracy, Toofer says the word again but because of his perceived cultural whiteness, everyone, including Tracy, is offended in a way they weren't when Tracy used the term. Tracy and Toofer attend sensitivity training, start arguing, and in the process develop a new sketch for TGS. When show starts running short on time, Liz offers Tracy the option to either air the sketch or one from the Star Jones cooking show, Tracy chooses the latter. Toofer is initially upset, but agrees with Tracy's decision when he finds the sketch funny.

In a subplot, Jack is secretly dating Condoleezza Rice, but gets upset when he sees Vladimir Putin touching her back. After being put on hold by Condoleezza, Jack walks into the bathroom and runs into Dennis there. Dennis, finding Jack a kindred spirit, shares his understanding of his relationship, motivating Jack to play hard to get. As a result, Jack breaks up with Condoleezza.

== Production ==
"The Break-Up" was written by that season's co-executive producers Brett Baer and Dave Finkel, and directed by Scott Ellis. This episode was the first writing credit for both Baer and Finkel, and the first one Ellis directed for 30 Rock. Baer and Finkel would later collaborate on the episode "Fireworks", that aired in the show's first season on April 5, 2007. "The Break-Up" originally aired on NBC on December 14, 2006, as the eighth episode of the series.

This episode was actor Dean Winters' third appearance on the series as the character, Dennis Duffy, a former boyfriend of Tina Fey's character, Liz Lemon. He appeared in the episodes "Jack Meets Dennis" and "Tracy Does Conan". Finkel has appeared on the show in a 10-second internet sitcom, Makin' It Happen, alongside staff writer Kay Cannon. The two play husband and wife. A series of Makin' It Happen was produced and the webisodes aired on NBC.com.

Rachel Dratch, longtime comedy partner and fellow Saturday Night Live alumna of Fey, the latter who was the show's head writer from 1999 until 2006, was originally cast to portray Jenna Maroney. Dratch played the role in the show's original pilot, but in August 2006, actress Jane Krakowski was announced as Dratch's replacement. Executive producer Lorne Michaels announced that while Dratch would not be playing a series regular, she would appear in various episodes in a different role. In this episode, Dratch played Pamela Smew, a group therapist in charge of sensitivity training between Tracy and Toofer. This was Dratch's fifth appearance on the series. Various other cast members of SNL have appeared on 30 Rock. These cast members include: Chris Parnell, Fred Armisen, Kristen Wiig, Will Forte, Jason Sudeikis and Molly Shannon. Fey and Tracy Morgan have both been part of the main cast of SNL. Chris Hansen of Dateline NBC's television segment To Catch a Predator appeared as himself in this episode, in which he confronts Dennis on To Catch a Predator.

== Reception ==
"The Break-Up" received generally good reception from critics. According to the Nielsen ratings system, "The Break-Up" was watched by 5.9 million households in its original American broadcast. It earned a 2.8 rating/8 share in the 18–49 demographic. This means that it was seen by 5.9 percent of all 18- to 49-year-olds, and 8 percent of all 18- to 49-year-olds watching television at the time of the broadcast. This was a decrease from the previous episode, "Tracy Does Conan", which was watched by 6.84 million American viewers. Scott Ellis, director of the episode, received a Primetime Emmy Award nomination for Outstanding Directing For a Comedy Series at the 59th Primetime Emmy Awards. Since airing, the episode received good reviews from television critics.

IGN contributor Robert Canning said that "The Break-Up" was "well put together", noting that it had "[g]ood set ups and good execution" and that it "gave us good comedy" as it had "plenty to work with." In regards to the Liz and Dennis story, he admitted that while it was funny, it was "fairly stereotypical." Canning commented that Jack's relationship with Condoleezza Rice in the episode was a "great concept" and "offered up a good number of chuckles", although "it never became as clever as it appeared it was going to be." Canning gave the episode a 6.5 out of 10 rating. TV Guide's Matt Mitovich was complimentary towards the episode, reporting, "Now this is what I'm talking about. Second-tier cast integration, multiple stories going on, intimations that Condoleezza Rice likes phone sex ... Another winning week for NBC's 30 Rock." Mitovich enjoyed the fact that Jack was in a relationship with Rice, writing that another show "would build [the] whole episode around them" but that 30 Rock "made it that much funnier by playing it in the background and thus getting to be more outrageous with it." Julia Ward of AOL's TV Squad wrote that Alec Baldwin "always knocks the ball out of the park on the acting front" but noted that "the best material" in this episode belonged to the Tracy and Toofer story. "The show does have a tendency to telegraph its punchlines, but it was nice to have the two men's differences resolved by finding the funny in a Star Jones/excessive vomiting sketch." Ward was complimentary towards Jane Krakowski, observing that her "comic timing" in "The Break-Up" was "impeccable as usual, but it would be nice to see her character get a tad more three-dimensional." Amy Amatangelo of the Boston Herald enjoyed Dean Winters' appearances on the show, citing that he does a "hilarious turn" as Dennis, while the Houston Chronicle's Mike McDaniel opined that Winters had a "[s]cene-stealing and hilarious role" on the show.
