= The Baby Show =

- 30 Rock episode
- Episode no.: Season 1 Episode 9
- Directed by: Michael Engler
- Written by: Jack Burditt
- Production code: 110
- Original air date: January 4, 2007

Episode chronology
← Previous "The Break-Up"	Next → "The Rural Juror"
- 30 Rock season 1

"The Baby Show" is the ninth episode of the first season of the American television comedy series 30 Rock. It was written by co-executive producer Jack Burditt and directed by Michael Engler. The episode originally aired on NBC in the United States on January 4, 2007. Guest stars in this episode include Katrina Bowden, Rachel Dratch, John Lutz, Bridget Moloney, Maulik Pancholy, Chris Parnell, Keith Powell, and Lonny Ross.

In the episode, Cerie Xerox (Katrina Bowden) gets engaged so that she can be a "young hot mom", causing Liz Lemon (Tina Fey) to think about marriage and having a family. Meanwhile, Jack Donaghy (Alec Baldwin) has trouble dealing with his own domineering mother, who wants to move in with him, and at the same time, Tracy Jordan (Tracy Morgan) becomes upset by Josh Girard's (Lonny Ross) impression of him.

== Plot ==
Cerie Xerox (Katrina Bowden) announces her engagement during a gathering for Jenna Maroney's (Jane Krakowski) birthday, and says that she wants to be a "young hot mom". Liz Lemon (Tina Fey) confronts her own marital and maternal status. She speaks with Jenna about this, and Jenna proceeds to tell all of the men in the office—Frank Rossitano (Judah Friedlander), James "Toofer" Spurlock (Keith Powell), and J. D. Lutz (John Lutz) that Liz is looking for someone to get her pregnant. Later that day, Liz sees Cerie in the makeup department getting herself made up. Anna (Bridget Moloney), the makeup artist has her baby at work with her. She asks Liz to hold the baby for a while, so Liz takes the baby for a stroll around the 30 Rock building. Suddenly she realizes that she is no longer in the building, but is now in her apartment. She hurries back to the office with the baby, and Pete Hornberger (Scott Adsit) fixes the situation.

Meanwhile, Jack Donaghy (Alec Baldwin) is being harassed by his mother over the phone. She calls him repeatedly, with the intention of moving in with him. The situation causes him to exhibit some stress-eating tendencies. At the same time, Tracy Jordan (Tracy Morgan) and Josh Girard (Lonny Ross) begin to hang out, but Tracy gets annoyed of Josh's impression of him. He demands that Liz fire Josh, but she refuses, so instead she tries to fix the situation, but Tracy threatens to go to Jack if she does not. Josh tries to avoid getting in trouble by calling Tracy and impersonating Jack, and then calling Jack and impersonating Tracy. It is not long before he is caught and Jack and Tracy have their revenge on him. As part of his punishment, Jack forces Josh to talk to his mother "Every day, for the rest of your or her life."

== Production ==
"The Baby Show" was written by co-executive producer Jack Burditt and directed by Michael Engler. This was Burditt's second writing credit, having written the episode "Jack Meets Dennis", and was Engler's first directed episode. "The Baby Show" originally aired on January 4, 2007 on NBC as the ninth episode of the show's first season and overall of the series. This was the first of several episodes to make reference to Liz's desire to become a mother. This plot came to a head in the third season episode "Do-Over" in which Liz attempts to adopt a child.

== Reception ==
"The Baby Show" received mixed reviews from television critics. According to the Nielsen ratings system, "The Baby Show" was watched by 5.9 million households, the same as the previous week's episode "The Break-Up", in its original American broadcast. It received a 3.0 rating/7 share among viewers in the 18–49 demographic. This means that it was seen by 3.0 percent of all 18- to 49-year-olds, and 7 percent of all 18- to 49-year-olds watching television at the time of the broadcast.

IGN contributor Robert Canning said the episode "had plenty of standout bits" but that it "represented a major flaw" and "perhaps in the program as a whole", citing that "[t]here seems to be more of an emphasis on comedic 'bits' rather than comedic 'situations,' which doesn't bode well for a situation comedy." He explained that "The Baby Show" in particular "felt very disjointed, bouncing between jokes more than storylines. It even opened with a Jenna surprise-birthday segment that was funny for what it was, but had absolutely nothing to do with the rest of the show." Canning gave the episode a 7.0 out 10 rating. TV Guide's Matt Mitovich liked that Josh had a story in this episode, and said that his impression of Tracy was "pretty good". He remarked that "The Baby Show" was "a solid episode, if a bit too theme-y for my broad-sitcom liking."
