= Tracy Does Conan =

- 30 Rock episode
- Episode no.: Season 1 Episode 7
- Directed by: Adam Bernstein
- Written by: Tina Fey
- Cinematography by: Tom Houghton
- Production code: 108
- Original air date: December 7, 2006

Guest appearances
- Katrina Bowden as Cerie Xerox; Kevin Brown as Dot Com Slattery; Grizz Chapman as Grizz Griswold; Rachel Dratch as Blue Man; Dave Finkel as 2nd AC; Conan O'Brien as himself; Maulik Pancholy as Jonathan; Chris Parnell as Dr. Leo Spaceman; Aubrey Plaza as Page; Keith Powell as Toofer Spurlock; Dean Winters as Dennis Duffy

Episode chronology
← Previous "Jack Meets Dennis"	Next → "The Break-Up"
- 30 Rock season 1

"Tracy Does Conan" is the seventh episode of NBC's first season of 30 Rock. It was written by the series' creator and executive producer, Tina Fey and it was directed by one of the season's supervising producers, Adam Bernstein. It first aired on December 7, 2006, in the United States and November 29, 2007, in the United Kingdom. Guest stars in the episode included Katrina Bowden, Kevin Brown, Grizz Chapman, Rachel Dratch, Dave Finkel, Maulik Pancholy, Chris Parnell, Aubrey Plaza, Keith Powell, and Dean Winters. Conan O'Brien appeared as himself in this episode. The episode marks the first appearance of Chris Parnell as recurring character Dr. Leo Spaceman.

This episode revolves around Liz Lemon (Tina Fey) and Pete Hornberger (Scott Adsit) trying to get Tracy Jordan (Tracy Morgan) to make a successful appearance on Late Night with Conan O'Brien, a late night talk show. These attempts are complicated when Tracy has a bad reaction to pills prescribed by Dr. Leo Spaceman and he temporarily goes crazy. Meanwhile, Jack Donaghy (Alec Baldwin) is preparing to give a speech at the Waldorf-Astoria.

== Plot ==
While giving a blood donation, Liz reveals that she plans to break up with her boyfriend, Dennis Duffy (Dean Winters) to the nurse, though the nurse suggests that Liz settle for him because of her disappointing sexual history on her medical records. On the way to her office, she runs into Jenna Maroney (Jane Krakowski) who reveals that Jack has "bumped" her from appearing on Late Night with Conan O'Brien. He has decided to put Tracy on in her place instead, even though the last time Tracy Jordan was on Late Night with Conan O'Brien, he pretended he was a stabbing robot and attacked Conan O'Brien. When Liz can't change Jack's mind (since Jack sees Tracy as a bigger star than Jenna, whose best work was doing commercials for ShopRite), Jenna threatens to quit her job, but Liz convinces her to say by insincerely saying that Jenna is "...a modern-day Lucille Ball" and "...prettier than Debra Messing."

As the taping time, 6 pm, is fast approaching, Tracy begins acting strangely. Liz and Pete discover that Tracy's medication has side effects that make Tracy act crazier than usual. Liz calls Tracy's doctor, Dr. Leo Spaceman (pronounced "Spe-Chem-In" and played by Chris Parnell), who gives her instructions regarding the medication. Liz gives the instructions to Kenneth Parcell (Jack McBrayer) who has to visit multiple identical pharmacies until he finds the correct one, which will have Tracy's new medication. Liz and Pete's attempts to get Tracy to the Late Night stage on time are further complicated as Jack persistently calls Liz to his office to ask for her advice on a speech he is going to read at The Waldorf Astoria. Tracy eventually appears on Late Night, normal enough to go through with the interview (despite dancing for a little too long during his introduction and almost taking his pants off), only to immediately fall asleep after sitting down.

Liz walks into her apartment after the Conan incident and Dennis is sitting on their bed playing Halo. He told Liz he got her a cheeseburger. She takes one bite and falls asleep listening to him playing the video game.

The episode ends with Kenneth the Page pretending to be interviewed on Late Night with Conan O'Brien while the real Conan walks by him and calls Kenneth a weirdo.

== Production ==
Rachel Dratch, longtime comedy partner and fellow Saturday Night Live alumna of Fey, was originally cast to portray Jenna. Dratch played the role in the show's original pilot, but in August 2006, Jane Krakowski was announced as Dratch's replacement. Executive producer Lorne Michaels announced that while Dratch would not be playing a series regular, she would appear in various episodes in a different role. In this episode, she played a hallucination of Tracy's, which he called Blue Dude.

Chris Parnell, who played Dr. Leo Spaceman in this episode, has appeared in the main cast of Saturday Night Live, a weekly sketch comedy series which airs on NBC in the United States. Tina Fey was the head writer on Saturday Night Live from 1999 until 2006. Various other cast members of Saturday Night Live have appeared on 30 Rock. These cast members include: Rachel Dratch, Fred Armisen, Kristen Wiig, Will Forte, Jason Sudeikis and Molly Shannon. Tina Fey and Tracy Morgan have both been part of the main cast of Saturday Night Live. Alec Baldwin has also hosted Saturday Night Live seventeen times, the highest number of episodes of any host of the series.

Star Wars is frequently referenced in 30 Rock, beginning with the pilot episode where Tracy Jordan is seen shouting that he is a Jedi. Liz Lemon admits to being a huge fan of Star Wars, saying that she had watched it many times with Pete Hornberger, and saying she dressed up as the Star Wars character Princess Leia during four Halloweens. Fey, a fan of Star Wars herself, said that the weekly Star Wars joke or reference "started happening organically" when the crew realized that they had a Star Wars reference "in almost every show". Fey said that from then on "it became a thing where [they] tried to keep it going", and that even though they could not include one in every episode, they still had a "pretty high batting average". Fey attributed most of the references to Robert Carlock, who she described as "the resident expert". Star Wars is referenced in this episode when Tracy Jordan takes on the identity of the character Chewbacca.

The episode briefly features actress Aubrey Plaza in her first television appearance, as an NBC page – a job she actually held at the time.

== Reception ==
"Tracy Does Conan" brought in an average of 6.84 million American viewers. This episode achieved a 3.2/8 in the key 18–49 demographic, a series high in that category. The 3.2 refers to 3.2% of all 18- to 49-year-olds in the U.S. and the 8 refers to 8% of all 18- to 49-year-olds watching television at the time of the broadcast, in the U.S.. In the United Kingdom, the episode attracted 400,000 viewers which was a 3% share of the viewing audience at the time of the broadcast.

Matt Webb Mitovich of TV Guide said that although "30 Rock gave us yet another riff on what a wild and crazy guy Tracy Jordan is", the series was really finding its footing. Mitovich enjoyed the appearances of Dratch and Parnell, labeling the latter as the highlight of the episode. Robert Canning of IGN said that the episode "failed to deliver the comic gold we were hoping for." Canning had hoped that Tracy's storyline would be a "subtle, fairly straightforward plot", in contrast to the wackiness the series had a reputation for, but found it unfunny. The reviewer did not enjoy the appearances of Dratch and Winters, and felt Conan O'Brien was not used to his full potential. Canning rated the episode 5 out of 10.

Tina Fey's writing for this episode earned her a nomination for the Primetime Emmy Award for Outstanding Writing in a Comedy Series, but lost the award to Greg Daniels of The Office for the episode "Gay Witch Hunt".
