= Sonia Blangiardo =

American television director and producer

Sonia Blangiardo (born April 18, 1968 in Brooklyn, New York, USA) is an American television soap opera director and producer. She is also the creator and director of the web series Tainted Dreams, which debuted on YouTube in December 2013.

== Positions held ==
All My Children

- Associate Producer (Late 1990s - 2000)
- Supervising Producer (April 2013 – August 2013)

One Life to Live

- Coordinating Producer (2000 - 2002)
- Producer (2010 - 2012)

As the World Turns

- Director (July 15, 2004 - September 17, 2010)

Days of Our Lives

- Director (2015–present)

Tainted Dreams (web series)

- Creator, director, writer, actor (2013)

Winterthorne (web series)

- Director (2015)

Pride: The Series (web series)

- Consulting Producer (2016)

== Awards and nominations ==
Daytime Emmy Award

- Win, 2018, Directing, "Days Of Our Lives"
- Win, 2007, Directing, As the World Turns
- Win, 2002, Drama Series, One Life to Live
- Nomination, 2014, Daytime Emmy Award for Outstanding New Approaches Drama Series, Tainted Dreams
- Nomination, 2017, Daytime Emmy Award for Outstanding Digital Daytime Drama Series, Tainted Dreams

Indie Series Award

- Nomination, 2016, Best Directing — Drama, Winterthorne
