= Charles Ancelle =

French producer and writer (born 1989)

- Born: Charles Ancelle; January 17, 1989 (age 37); Paris, France
- Occupation: Film producer
- Years active: 2009–present
- Website: charlesancelle.com

Charles Ancelle (January 17, 1989), is a French producer and writer. He co-produced Behind The Blinds AKA Filmmaking 101, a comedy web series about independent filmmaking.

== Background ==
Charles Ancelle was born and raised in Paris, France. Charles went on to study at the Sorbonne University in Paris, where he earned a Bachelor of Arts in Art & Film History.

== Career ==
At 19, when Charles was a student at the Sorbonne, he produced his first short film to gain further knowledge of the practical aspects of the art of filmmaking. His work was recognized for excellence, being accepted into 2009 Cannes Short Film Corner as an Official Selection.

After completing his Bachelor with honors, Charles enrolled in further studies at The New York Film Academy, seeking a Master of Fine Arts in Filmmaking. During this period of time, Charles produced dozens of short films of various lengths, earning him honored recognition by the Academy for his ability to create professional content with limited resources. While at The New York Film Academy, Charles met his producing partner, Anna Skrypka, with whom he has collaborated on every project since. The final film he produced at the Academy, titled John Bondage, received international recognition, winning awards and being chosen as an Official Selection at a number of noteworthy film festivals, including The Cannes Short Film Corner, The HollyShorts Film Festival, The Costa Rica International Film Festival and the International Film Festival of Cinematic Arts, where the film won an award for the performance of its lead actor.

Straight out of film school, Charles was approached by Jonathan Rosenthal and Alessandra Torresani to produce a large-scale short film The Pinhole Affect that would star multiple celebrities, such as Elena Satine, Tyson Ritter and Alexandra Krosney, as well as Alessandra Torresani herself.

In June 2013, Charles was invited to teach a seminar on Independent Film Production at the New York Film Academy. Moreover, his achievements and extraordinary talent have been featured in a number of industry publications. Among other sources, he was interviewed by Judith Jones for the Actors Entertainment On-line Series.

At the end of 2015, Charles co-produced a comedy [web series] [Behind The Blinds AKA Filmmaking 101] that is distributed on ASCA Films' YouTube channel. Today, Charles is involved in a number of projects that remain in production.

== Filmography ==
Year	Title	Role	Notes
2016	At Last	Producer	
2015–present	Behind The Blinds AKA Filmmaking 101	Producer	Also co-director
2015	The Pinhole Affect	Producer	
2015	Waves	Producer	
2013	John Bondage	Producer	
2013	Martha's Key	Producer	
2012	Anomy	Producer	
2012	A Way Out	Producer	
2012	Cross the Line	Producer	
2009	Le sacre de la nuit	Producer	
