= Damned If You Do... =

- Gotham episode
- Episode no.: Season 2 Episode 1
- Directed by: Danny Cannon
- Written by: Bruno Heller
- Production code: 4X6201
- Original air date: September 21, 2015

Guest appearances
- Cameron Monaghan as Jerome Valeska; Peter Scolari as Commissioner Gillian Loeb; Anthony Carrigan as Victor Zsasz; Dustin Ybarra as Robert Greenwood; Todd Stashwick as Richard Sionis; Will Brill as Arnold Dobkin; David Fierro as Zaardon; Otto Sanchez as Odgen Barker; James Andrew O'Connor as Tommy Bones; Stink Fisher as Aaron Helzinger; Philip Goodwin as Compere; Drew Powell as Butch Gilzean

Episode chronology
← Previous "All Happy Families Are Alike"	Next → "Knock, Knock"
- Gotham season 2

"Damned If You Do..." is the 23rd episode overall and second-season premiere of the FOX series Gotham. The episode was written by series developer Bruno Heller and directed by Danny Cannon. It was first broadcast on September 21, 2015, in FOX.

The episode deals with the aftermath of the events in the previous season finale. Cobblepot has become the boss of the organized crime of Gotham City; Gordon was fired by Commissioner Loeb; Bruce tries to know more about his father's secret after finding a secret door; and the arrival of Theo and Tabitha Galavan, who plan to take revenge on the Waynes.

The episode was watched by 4.57 million viewers, and received positive reviews, with critics praising the new tone set for the season.

== Plot ==
Picking up where the last season left, Bruce (David Mazouz) and Alfred (Sean Pertwee) discover a hideout behind the fireplace with secret stairs. Upon descending the stairs, they discover a locked door with a password pad. Alfred tries to tell him that there must be another way to open it since there would be "millions of possiblilities".

One month later, Gordon (Benjamin McKenzie) has been reassigned from the GCPD to traffic duty; Bullock (Donal Logue) is retired, working in a bar; Cobblepot is now the boss of organized crime of Gotham City; and Barbara (Erin Richards) is incarcerated in Arkham Asylum. During a shift, Gordon arrests a man calling himself "Zaardon the Soul Reaper" (David Fierro) when he wreaks havoc. Commissioner Loeb (Peter Scolari) fires Gordon for punishing an officer for showing up late to work.

In Arkham, Jerome Valeska (Cameron Monaghan) approaches Barbara, telling her that Richard Sionis (Todd Stashwick) can give her anything she wants. Zaardon is transferred to Arkham and a blue gas spills from his mouth, which makes everyone in the room unconscious. A woman and her cohorts appear in Arkham, kills the asylum guards and subdues Barbara, Jerome, Sionis, Aaron Helzinger (Stink Fisher), Robert Greenwood (Dustin Ybarra) and Arnold Dobkins (Will Brill). The woman, Tabitha (Jessica Lucas), brings them to her brother Theo Galavan (James Frain). Galavan plans on using them as a group to wreak havoc in Gotham in a yet-unknown plan. Sionis refuses the offer and tries to leave with Barbara, but Tabitha kills him. Barbara then calls Gordon, trying to tell him Lee (Morena Baccarin) was the one who attacked her. Gordon dismisses her and drops the phone. She then leaves a threatening message on Lee's phone, telling her she wishes she was dead.

Gordon goes with Cobblepot, asking him for help in returning to the GCPD and firing Loeb. Cobblepot agrees in exchange for Gordon collecting a debt from Odgen Barker (Otto Sanchez), who had a $70,000 debt with Falcone but thinks he forfeited it since Falcone retired. Gordon refuses and leaves. Upon reconsidering, Gordon visits Barker. Barker refuses and threatens Gordon with a gun, which prompts Gordon to attack his bodyguards. Gordon takes the money and leaves but is pursued by the bodyguards. He escapes to the parking lot where he is confronted by Barker. Gordon shoots Barker and gives the money to Cobblepot. That night, Cobblepot and Victor Zsasz (Anthony Carrigan) sneak into Loeb's home and blackmail him. Loeb quits the GCPD and names Sarah Essen (Zabryna Guevara) the new Commissioner. Gordon tells Lee about what he did for Cobblepot later.

Bruce decides to create a homemade fertilizer bomb to open the door, to Alfred's shock. The two blow up the door to reveal a study room and a computer. Bruce finds a note where his father tells him that he suspected there was corruption in Wayne Enterprises and how he became paranoid. He also tells him not to search further as the truth found in the computer will change his life.

== Reception ==
=== Ratings ===
The episode was watched by 4.57 million viewers. This made Gotham the most watched program of the day in FOX, beating Minority Report.

With Live+7 DVR viewing factored in, the episode had an overall rating of 7.49 million viewers, and a 2.8 in the 18–49 demographic.

=== Critical reception ===
Professional ratings
Review scores
Source	Rating
Rotten Tomatoes (Tomatometer)	79%
Rotten Tomatoes (Average Score)	7.7
The A.V. Club	B
Paste Magazine	7.5
TV Fanatic	4.5/5 stars
IGN	7.5
Den of Geek	3/5 stars
New York Magazine	2/5 stars

"Rise of the Villains: Damned If You Do..." received positive reviews from critics. The episode received a rating of 79% with an average score of 7.7 out of 10 on the review aggregator Rotten Tomatoes, with the site's consensus stating: "'Damned if You Do...' signals a potential reinvention by shifting Gotham's focus away from weekly procedural cases and toward more substantial serialized story arcs.

Matt Fowler of IGN gave the episode a "good" 7.5 out of 10 and wrote in his verdict, "Gotham still has silliness to smooth out (that Gordon close-up running cam again, like in the pilot?) and head-scratchers to hash out (is co-ed Arkham mingling a thing? Feels like it shouldn't be), but overall this Fish-free premiere felt like a shuffle in the right direction."

The A.V. Club's Kyle Fowle gave the episode a "B" grade and wrote, "The season two premiere, 'Damned If You Do...,' by contrast, is more promising than anything in the first 22 episodes. What's remarkable is that Gotham didn't even need to do that much to make its first hour of this season captivating. The pieces have been there all along; it's just that the quality of the show depends on how they all get arranged. The biggest change in the premiere from all previous episodes is in the tone of the show. There are still silly villains and stilted dialogue, but it's clear that the show is no longer taking itself too seriously. Where the first season never managed to balance its campy elements with its more gritty ambitions, 'Damned If You Do...' strikes that balance almost immediately."
