= Knock, Knock (Gotham) =

- Gotham episode
- Episode no.: Season 2 Episode 2
- Directed by: Rob Bailey
- Written by: Ken Woodruff
- Production code: 4X6202
- Original air date: September 28, 2015

Guest appearances
- Cameron Monaghan as Jerome Valeska; Richard Kind as Mayor Aubrey James; Chelsea Spack as Kristen Kringle; Maria Thayer as Scottie Mullens; Dustin Ybarra as Robert Greenwood; Will Brill as Arnold Dobkins; Stink Fisher as Aaron Helzinger; Thom Sesma as Barthel

Episode chronology
← Previous "Damned If You Do..."	Next → "The Last Laugh"
- Gotham season 2

"Knock, Knock" is the second episode of the second season and 24th episode overall from the FOX series Gotham. The episode was written by Ken Woodruff and directed by Rob Bailey. It was first broadcast on September 28, 2015, in FOX. In this episode, Gordon is assigned in investigating the Arkham escapees, now calling themselves "the Maniax". Meanwhile, Bruce is getting closer to the truth about his father's office.

The episode was watched by 4.65 million viewers and received critical acclaim, the greatest of any episode, with critics commenting on the GCPD massacre.

== Plot ==
Having kidnapped Mayor James (Richard Kind) and locked him with a metal box, Galavan (James Frain) makes him call his secretary and tell her that he ran away. Meanwhile, on the rooftops of the editorial Gotham Gazette building, Jerome (Cameron Monaghan) and many other group members kill a number of people and drop them from the rooftop so their corpses can form the word of their group: "Maniax!".

In the GCPD, Commissioner Essen (Zabryna Guevara) gives orders to arrest the Maniax with Gordon (Ben McKenzie) leading the investigation. In Wayne Manor, Bruce (David Mazouz) decides to turn on the computer so he can know his father's secret. When the computer seems to work, Alfred (Sean Pertwee) smashes the computer, claiming he wouldn't want him to know about his father being a killer. Angered, Bruce fires him.

Tensions begin to arise between Jerome and Robert Greenwood (Dustin Ybarra) about the leadership of The Maniax. Gordon tries to get Bullock (Donal Logue) back into the GCPD but his fiancée Scottie (Maria Thayer) is against his wishes as she fears for his life. The Maniax hijack a bus filled with cheerleaders, planning to burn it down. The police arrives and when Jerome escapes, Dobkins (Will Brill) turns on the fire but Gordon manages to drive the bus away from the fire. He then arrests Dobkins and upon questioning him about who hired them, Tabitha (Jessica Lucas) kills Dobkins with a rifle in distance. Bruce finds Alfred at a station, telling him he regrets what happened and re-hires him when he intends on training him, but making him fix the computer. Alfred then asks Lucius Fox (Chris Chalk) to fix the computer.

In the GCPD, Gordon receives a call from Barbara (Erin Richards), who turns out to be in the building. Gordon follows her to an alley but is attacked by Helzinger (Stink Fisher) and is then taunted by Barbara about something happening in the GCPD. In the GCPD, the Maniax arrive dressed as cops and instigates a massacre, killing nearly everyone in the building. Lee (Morena Baccarin) survives by hiding in her lab while Nygma (Cory Michael Smith) saves Kringle (Chelsea Spack) from a gunshot. Jerome begins taunting Essen while she was tied up, killing Greenwood for saying his lines.

Gordon returns to the GCPD and discovers the massacre. He then finds Essen bleeding and stays by her side as she dies. Bruce visits Gordon in the GCPD, wanting to make sure he's okay. Bullock decides to return to the GCPD despite his fiancée's warning. The episode ends when Gordon and Bullock watch a videotape showing Jerome moments before fleeing the building, stating "they have not seen anything yet".

== Reception ==
=== Ratings ===
The episode was watched by 4.65 million viewers. This was an increase in viewership from the season premiere, which was watched by 4.57 million viewers. This made Gotham the most watched program of the day in FOX, beating Minority Report.

=== Critical reviews ===
Professional ratings
Review scores
Source	Rating
Rotten Tomatoes (Tomatometer)	100%
Rotten Tomatoes (Average Score)	7.9
IGN	8.0
The A.V. Club	B
Paste Magazine	8.0
TV Fanatic	4.8/5 stars

"Rise of the Villains: Knock, Knock" received critical acclaim from critics, with critics commenting the GCPD massacre. The episode received a rating of 100% with an average score of 7.9 out of 10 on the review aggregator Rotten Tomatoes, with the site's consensus stating: "'Knock, Knock' combines over-the-top villainy and thrilling action to make for lurid spectacle.""

Matt Fowler of IGN gave the episode a "great" 8.0 out of 10 and wrote in his verdict, "'Knock, Knock' wasn't a smooth ride, but parts of it did feel like the series was newly reinvigorated with focus and confidence, fully embracing madcap violence. And the villains' big, game-changing move at the end was just what the show needed right now."

The A.V. Club's Kyle Fowle gave the episode a "B" grade and wrote, "'Knock, Knock' sees this season's ominous villain and all around rich dude Theo Galavan begin to put his plan in to place. That plan involves unleashing psychopaths on Gotham and creating chaos, driving the citizens to seek comfort and solace in the protection and security that Galavan and his psychopaths will then offer. 'A cleansing,' he calls it, and it's an appropriate term for what the show itself is currently undergoing. For the second straight week Gotham shows signs of shedding many of the issues that bogged down its first season, from tone-deaf comedic beats to paper-thin characters, and moving towards something more focused.
