= Keith Broke His Leg =

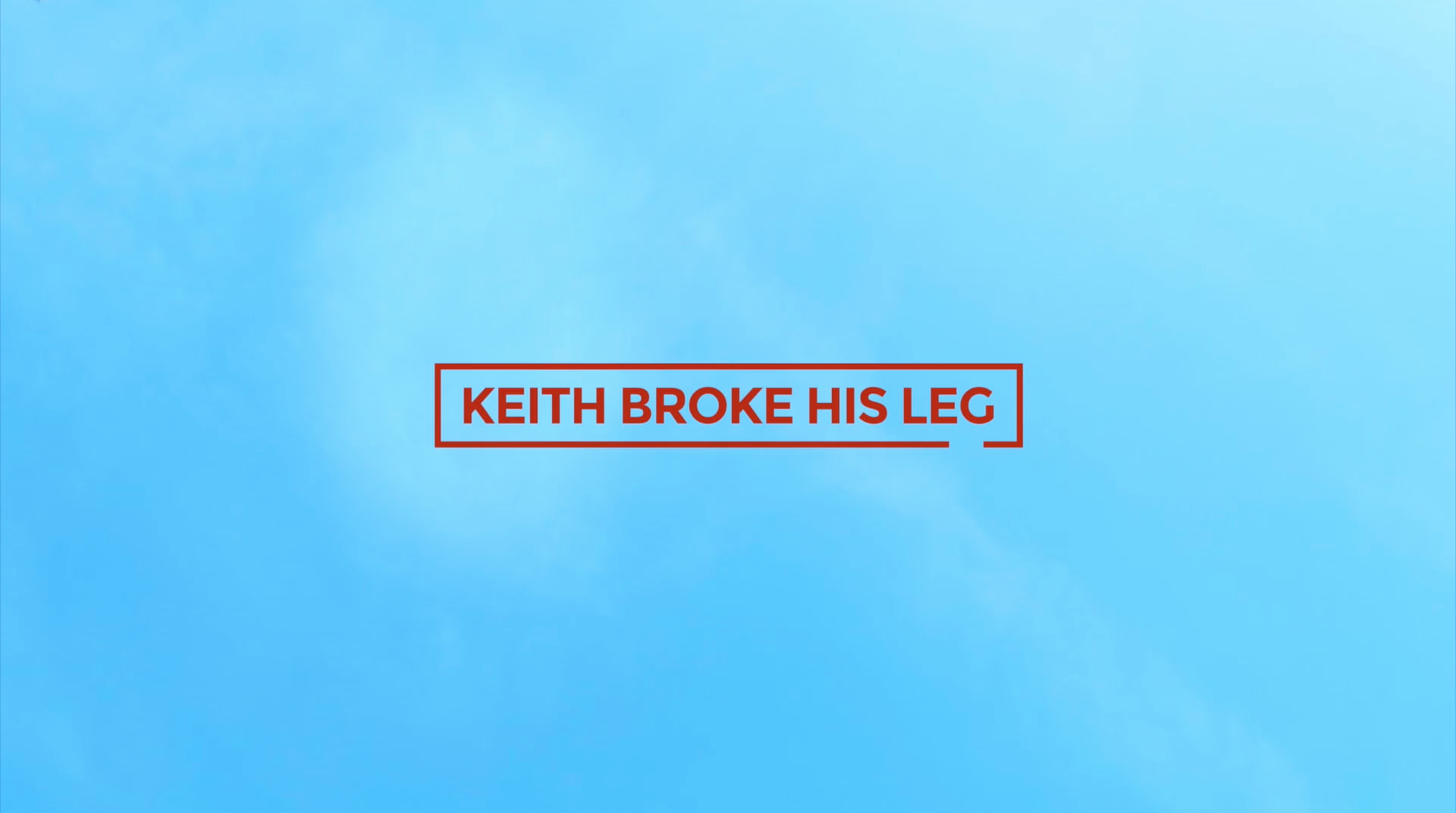
- Genre: Comedy
- Created by: Keith Powell
- Written by: Keith Powell
- Directed by: Keith Powell
- Starring: Keith Powell; Jill Knox
- Country of origin: United States
- Original language: English
- No. of seasons: 1
- No. of episodes: 10

Production
- Producers: Keith Powell; Loch Powell
- Production location: Los Angeles, CA
- Running time: 7–14 minutes

Original release
- Release: August 25, 2015 – present

Keith Broke His Leg is an American comedy web series created by Keith Powell. It premiered its first six episodes on August 25, 2015 through its official website, and released subsequent episodes intermittently through September 2016. Set in Powell's home, and inspired by his real life, the show follows Keith through a series of visits with his friends and family while he recuperates from an unknown accident that left his right leg broken. Most guest actors who appear in the show play a parody version of themselves, including Aubrey Plaza, Fiona Gubelmann, Malcolm Barrett, Leonard Robinson, and Alexandra Krosney. Powell writes, directs, and produces all episodes in addition to starring.

Upon its release, the show received much publicity due to Powell blogging for The Huffington Post, which highlighted each episode of the show. The blogs discussed race, politics, relationships, friendship, marriage, and other current events as it relates to specific moments in the web series. Particularly, his blog post highlighting the "You Talk White" phenomenon (promoting the episode "Baller") received widespread attention on NPR, HuffPost Live, and various international news blogs.

== Series overview ==
The series is a semi-autobiographical comedy about 30 Rock star Keith Powell's self-discovery when he is suddenly stripped of his ability to be mobile. After an accident, Keith is forced to see the world in a new way when his wife, his friends, and especially his agent don't make life easy for the incapacitated. What results is a series of visits with the floura and fauna of the Hollywood comedy world, with most of the actors playing parodies of themselves. The style of the show is slower-paced and more observational than traditional comedies, with elements of drama, surrealism, and philosophy throughout. Powell has described the show as contemplative with "earned" jokes.

== Cast ==
=== Main ===
- Keith Powell as Keith—the eponymous character. It is never revealed how he broke his leg. Keith has described his character as transitioning from "indifference and complacency to self awareness and empathy."
- Jill Knox as Jill— his wife. Powell and Knox are married in real life, and as on the series, she is a visual artist.

=== Guest stars ===
All actors play parodies of themselves unless otherwise noted.

- Chris Mathieu – as The Repair Guy
- Leonard Robinson
- Roxana Ortega
- Matt Caplan – as The Waiter
- Fiona Gubelmann
- Alex Weed
- Tracey Wigfield – as Michael, Keith's Agent
- Kent Moran – as Keith's neighbor
- Alyssa Diaz
- Karla Mosley
- Alexandra Krosney
- Aubrey Plaza
- Kassie Thornton
- Seth Kirschner
- Malcolm Barrett
- Craig Lee Thomas – as Police Officer
- Adam Michael Rose – as Police Officer
- Jackie Alixander
- Kingston Covington – as Keith's Inner Child

== Episodes ==
The first six episodes of Volume 1 were released through Vimeo and www.GetBroken.com on August 25, 2015. Two more episodes were released on November 12, 2015, with the last two episodes of the season released on February 12, 2016. Mailing list subscribers got to watch the episodes prior to the official release dates, and TV Insider released two episodes a week prior to the world premiere of the series.

The series had advance showings at The Upright Citizens Brigade Theater in Los Angeles prior to its August 25 release, with 30 Rock co-star Jack McBrayer conducting a Q&A afterwards.

No.	Title	Directed by	Written by	Original release date
1	"Pornhole"	Keith Powell	Keith Powell	August 25, 2015
Confined to the house with a broken leg, Keith must find new ways to occupy his time. Also, do women really like James Deen?
2	"Engage"	Keith Powell	Keith Powell	August 25, 2015
Keith must do a favor for a questionable friend. Also, has “CP Time” gone out of style?
3	"Soup"	Keith Powell	Keith Powell	August 25, 2015
Keith loves to cook, but when vegan friends invite themselves to dinner, all recipes and sensibilities go down the drain. Also, how much does it really cost to install a pool?
4	"Baller"	Keith Powell	Keith Powell	August 25, 2015
Keith was born in West Philadelphia. Try telling his agent that. Also, will you PLEASE curb your dog!?
5	"Id"	Keith Powell	Keith Powell	August 25, 2015
As Jill throws a “ladies night,” Keith is left to ponder the significance of a dream. Also, can you be taboo playing TABOO?
6	"Chocolate"	Keith Powell	Keith Powell	August 25, 2015
Keith tells some friends the story of his first time. Also, has the universe conspired to cripple him?
7	"Mellow"	Keith Powell	Keith Powell	November 12, 2015
When Jill throws a karaoke party, Keith is left to handle some unwelcome visitors. Also, how do New Zealanders pronounce “deck”?
8	"Soothsayer"	Keith Powell	Keith Powell	November 12, 2015
Roxie (from “Engage”) returns to deliver Keith some prophetic wisdom. Also, why are hammocks so complicated?
9	"Class"	Keith Powell	Keith Powell	February 12, 2016
When Keith teaches a master class to an insensitive group of high school students, his patience is tested. Also, how do you pronounce George "Takei"?
10	"Lullaby"	Keith Powell	Keith Powell	February 12, 2016
Jill and Keith have a date night at home. Also, how can you tell when you’ve had too much to drink?

== Production ==
Powell self-funded the first season, citing the personal nature of the project and his reluctance to initially crowdfund. He wrote an article on IndieWire detailing his process.

The series is filmed on location in Los Angeles, California in Powell's real life home. Additionally, the home was featured on HGTV's "House Hunters Renovation" and "House Hunters Where Are They Now?"

The color palette of the show is highly saturated, highlighting the colors blue and red. Powell has stated that the entire production time took longer than usual due to the low budget of the series. In addition, Powell employed the use of drone cameras to take the place of cranes and dollies, and the series was shot exclusively on DSLR cameras.

The theme song is composed by 30 Rock co-composer Giancarlo Vulcano, inspired by the Motown sound of the 1960s. Vulcano also collaborated with Powell for the score of My Name Is David.

== Reception ==
After the release of the first six episodes, Tubefilter called the series a "sleek, well shot, reasonably funny web series" and concluded "it's a nice way to spend an hour." TV Insider stated "For seven seasons, Keith Powell was 30 Rock’s uptight and under-appreciated “Toofer” Spurlock, but now, the man who battled Frank Rossitano for the right to wear Harvard gear and battled Tracy Jordan over a certain word is stepping, with the help of crutches, into his own spotlight." Review & Roast pointed out that Powell and Knox "played well off each other and it was obvious they had real chemistry." Reviewing the show at the Raindance Film Festival, Vodzilla noted the show's dry pace, stating, "That mundane approach makes for a relatable series which lacks in laugh-out-loud moments but builds up to them with a restraint and gentle tone that makes them more satisfying... there’s surprising substance here."

=== Awards and nominations ===
In 2016, Powell won the Best Actor (Comedy) award at the New York Television Festival.

The series was nominated for seven 2016 Indie Series Awards, winning two, including Best Web Series – Comedy. In 2017, it was nominated for an additional six Indie Series Awards.

Year	Award	Category	Nominee(s)	Result
2016	7th Indie Series Awards	Best Web Series — Comedy		Won
2016	7th Indie Series Awards	Best Lead Actor — Comedy	Keith Powell as Keith	Won
2016	7th Indie Series Awards	Best Directing — Comedy	Keith Powell	Nominated
2016	7th Indie Series Awards	Best Writing — Comedy	Keith Powell	Nominated
2016	7th Indie Series Awards	Best Lead Actress — Comedy	Jill Knox as Jill	Nominated
2016	7th Indie Series Awards	Best Guest Actress — Comedy	Alexandra Krosney as Alex	Nominated
2016	7th Indie Series Awards	Best Sound Design	Richard Sheehan	Nominated
2017	8th Indie Series Awards	Best Web Series — Comedy		Nominated
2017	8th Indie Series Awards	Best Writing — Comedy	Keith Powell	Nominated
2017	8th Indie Series Awards	Best Lead Actor — Comedy	Keith Powell as Keith	Nominated
2017	8th Indie Series Awards	Best Supporting Actress — Comedy	Jill Knox as Jill	Won
2017	8th Indie Series Awards	Best Guest Actor — Comedy	Nic Few as Nic	Nominated
2017	8th Indie Series Awards	Best Production Design	Jill Knox	Nominated
