= Speed-Dating (2010 film) =

2010 film by Joseph A. Elmore Jr.

- Theatrical release poster
- Directed by: Joseph A. Elmore Jr.
- Screenplay by: Joseph A. Elmore Jr.
- Produced by: La Monde Byrd; Mekita Faiye
- Starring: Wesley Jonathan; Chris Elliott; Holly Robinson Peete
- Cinematography: David Daniel
- Edited by: Terry Walters
- Music by: Evan Scot Hornsby
- Production company: Rockstone Releasing
- Distributed by: Image Entertainment
- Release date: June 4, 2010
- Running time: 98 minutes
- Country: United States
- Language: English
- Box office: $6,188

Speed-Dating is a 2010 American comedy film written and directed by Joseph A. Elmore Jr. and starring Wesley Jonathan, Chris Elliott, and Holly Robinson Peete.

== Plot ==
Best friends Dog (Chico Benymon) and Beaver (Leonard Robinson) have difficulty ever meeting women. No matter what they do, nothing ever goes right for them. That all changes when the best friend Too Cool (Wesley Jonathan) invites them to try out a round of speed dating.

== Cast ==
- Wesley Jonathan as "Too Cool"
- Mekita Faiye as Danielle
- Chico Benymon as "Dog"
- Leonard Robinson as "Beaver"
- Vanessa Simmons as Elizabeth
- Chris Elliott as Inspector Green
- Holly Robinson Peete as Gayle
- Clint Howard as Dom
- Camille Mana as Kiki

== Reception ==
Jeanette Catsoulis from The New York Times disliked the picture:

A tired mash-up of every men-behaving-badly sitcom ever to grace a third-tier television network, Speed-Dating tries to coax laughs from characters so dated even Eddie Murphy would balk.

On the other hand, Nick Pinkerton from The Village Voice gave the film a mixed to positive review:

With characters named Too Cool, Dog, and Beaver, Speed-Dating already won... A homemade vaudeville that’s likable enough to wear you down with its eager-to-please capering.

== See also ==
- List of black films of the 2010s
