= Kevin Spirtas =

American actor

- Born: St. Louis, Missouri, U.S.
- Occupation: Actor

Kevin Spirtas is an American actor. He is perhaps best known for his roles as Dr. Craig Wesley on the soap opera Days of Our Lives, Jonas Chamberlain on the ABC soap opera One Life to Live, and Nick Rogers in the slasher film Friday the 13th Part VII: The New Blood (1988).

== Career ==
Kevin Spirtas has appeared as Dr. Craig Wesley on the soap opera Days of Our Lives, Jonas Chamberlain on the ABC soap opera One Life to Live, and as Nick Rogers in the slasher film Friday the 13th Part VII: The New Blood (1988). Spirtas has worked on Broadway, with roles including Hugh Jackman's understudy as Peter Allen in The Boy from Oz. He began using the name "Kevin Spirtas" professionally in 1995, having been previously credited as "Kevin Blair".

In 2015, Spirtas portrayed Dominic Delacort on the soap opera web series Winterthorne. In 2016, he won an Indie Series Award for Best Guest Actor in a Drama at the 7th Indie Series Awards, and was nominated for a Daytime Emmy Award for Outstanding Actor in a Digital Daytime Drama Series for the role at the 43rd Daytime Creative Arts Emmy Awards.

== Personal life ==
Spirtas was born in St. Louis, Missouri, the son of Sandra, who is active in community politics, and Arnold Spirtas, who runs an environmental demolition company. Spirtas graduated from Ladue Horton Watkins High School in 1980.

He was raised Jewish and is openly gay.

== Filmography ==
- The Hills Have Eyes Part II (1984) – Roy
- Rituals (1984) – Tom Gallagher (1984–1985)
- The Facts of Life (1986) – Doug
- Friday the 13th Part VII: The New Blood (1988) – Nicholas Rogers
- Quantum Leap (1989) – Bob Thompson
- Bloodstone: Subspecies II (1993) – Mel
- Bloodlust: Subspecies III (1994) – Mel
- Valley of the Dolls (1994, series) – Tim Burke
- Silk Stalkings (1995) – Steven Kincade
- Raging Angels (1995) – Zealot
- Who Killed Buddy Blue? (1995) – Brad Caesar
- Green Plaid Shirt (1997) – Guy
- Married... with Children (1996) – Instructor
- A Match Made in Heaven (1997) – Bruce
- Fired Up (1997) – John
- Days of Our Lives (1997–2003, 2005, 2009, 2022) – Craig Wesley
- Defying Gravity (1997) – Bartender
- Striking Resemblance (1997) – Michael / Mitchell
- The Young and the Restless (1997)
- Apt Pupil (1998) – Paramedic
- Embrace the Darkness (1999) – Galen
- Friends (2000) – Dr. Wesley
- V.I.P. (2000) – Mr. Groom
- God's Helper (2001) – Dwight
- Love Bytes (2001) – Jesus
- Daredevil (2003) – Prosecutor at Jackson Trial (Director's cut)
- Horror High (2005) – Lt. Hellstrom
- One Life to Live (2008) – Jonas Chamberlain
- Albino Farm (2009) – Preacher
- His Name Was Jason: 30 Years of Friday the 13th (Documentary film; 2009) – Himself
- Hustling (TV series; 2012–2014) – Joel
- Crystal Lake Memories: The Complete History of Friday the 13th (Documentary film; 2013) – Himself
- The Dark Rite (2015) – Man
- Winterthorne (2015) – Dominic Delacort
- Backstabbed (2016) – Max Rhymer
- After Forever (2017– ) – Brian
- Blood Bound (2018) – Man
- Days of Our Lives: The Digital Series (2019) – Craig Wesley
