= Untitled Stephen Merchant film =

American romantic comedy film

The Sham
- Directed by: Stephen Merchant
- Screenplay by: Stephen Merchant; John Butler
- Produced by: Seth Rogen; Stephen Merchant; Lee Eisenberg; Evan Goldberg; James Weaver; Josh Fagen
- Starring: Cameron Diaz; Stephen Merchant; Josh Segarra; Sherry Cola; Jake Lacy; Heidi Gardner; Judith Light; Rob Lowe
- Production company: Point Grey Pictures
- Distributed by: Amazon MGM Studios
- Country: United States
- Language: English

Stephen Merchant is directing an upcoming American romantic comedy film from a screenplay he co-wrote with John Butler in which he stars alongside Cameron Diaz.

== Premise ==
A workaholic and a struggling stand-up comedian fake being married for their own purposes.

== Cast ==
- Cameron Diaz
- Stephen Merchant
- Josh Segarra
- Sherry Cola
- Jake Lacy
- Heidi Gardner
- Judith Light
- Rob Lowe
- Myra Lucretia Taylor
- Lisa Gilroy
- Dustin Ybarra
- Fabrizio Guido
- Frankie Faison
- Alex Moffat

== Production ==
In January 2026, it was announced that Stephen Merchant would co-write and direct a romantic comedy that he would star in alongside Cameron Diaz. In March, Josh Segarra, Sherry Cola, Myra Lucretia Taylor, Lisa Gilroy, Dustin Ybarra, Fabrizio Guido, Jake Lacy, Judith Light, and Rob Lowe joined the cast. In April 2026, Frankie Faison, Alex Moffat, and Heidi Gardner rounded out the cast.

Filming began in March 2026 in New York City.
