= Otto Sanchez =

American actor

Otto Sanchez is an American actor best known for playing Carmen Guerra in the HBO prison drama Oz. He also played the role of Otto in the short-lived drama Kidnapped. He appeared as a supporting character in Bad Boys II. He played the lead role of Paul in the film Push which won awards at The Long Island Film Festival. He has also been seen in NBC's Law & Order, Law & Order: Special Victims Unit, Law & Order: Criminal Intent, Third Watch, 100 Centre Street, Burn Notice and most recently Blue Bloods.

== Early life ==
Sanchez, a native New Yorker, was raised by his mother, Violeta Zoila Carbajal, in Jackson Heights, Queens. He was the youngest of two boys and two girls.

Otto's passion for painting was his first connection into the arts. After pursuing Advertising Design at the Fashion Institute of Technology in New York City, 1987 to 1989, then fine arts at the Columbus College of Art and Design, in Columbus, Ohio, on a scholarship, his passion shifted into theater. Returning to New York City in 1991, he studied acting under Jeanne Kaplan and Austin Pendleton at HB Studio. In 1998, he landed his breakthrough role Carmen "Chico" Guerra on the HBO series Oz.

== Credits ==
Other film credits include Negrito in Kill the Poor. "Ping Pong" in Double Whammy by Tom DiCillo.

TV credits: Danny Santos in "Canterbury's Law (with Julianna Margulies), Deputy Sheriff Rick Silo opposite Academy Award-winner Melissa Leo The Fighter in Criminal Minds.

Sanchez made a guest appearance on Curb Your Enthusiasm and 100 Centre Street.

TV pilots: Denis Leary and Peter Tolan's NBC police dramedy Fort Pit as Tommy Cruz, and Mark Rosner's TNT TV drama The Line as Christian Diaz.

Sanchez has also appeared on stage. His last part was in November 2008, in the world premiere of Beau Willimon's political play Farragut North (now adapted into the film Ides of March) directed by Doug Hughes (Doubt) at the Atlantic Theater Company in New York City in the dual role of Frank/Waiter opposite John Gallagher, Jr.

"In one of the play's sharpest moments a waiter played by Otto Sanchez earnestly tells Stephen about his hard-luck American life, and you can see Stephen (John Gallagher, Jr.) translating it into a stump-speech anecdote in his head." — Ben Brantley, NY Times.

In 2004 he co-starred opposite John Ventimiglia of The Sopranos in the role of Wallace, in the Off-Broadway play Ponies, produced by Emmy award-winner Michael Imperioli at Studio Dante in New York City.

Otto's recent film projects include The Moment I Died with Colleen Divincentis and Jocelyn Druyan, directed and written by Vincent Zambrano.

== Filmography ==
| Year | Title | Role | Notes |
|---|---|---|---|
| 1998-2003 | Oz | Chico Guerra | TV series, 40 episodes |
| 1999 | Mute Love | Richard | feature film |
| 1999-2000 | Third Watch | Mikey | TV series, 3 episodes |
| 2000 | Overnight Sensation | Yucca Sanchez | feature film |
| 2000 | Law & Order | Det. Hector Diaz | TV series, Episode: "Standoff" |
| 2000 | Law & Order: Special Victims Unit | Delfino Melendez | TV series, 1 episode |
| 2001 | Double Whammy | Ping Pong | feature film |
| 2001 | Dregs of Society | Matty | feature film |
| 2001 | 100 Centre Street | | TV series, 1 episode |
| 2002 | Law & Order: Special Victims Unit | Eddie Fuente | TV series, 1 episode |
| 2003 | Kill the Poor | Negrito | feature film |
| 2003 | Bad Boys II | Carlos | feature film |
| 2003 | Law & Order | Reynaldo Celaya | TV series, 1 episode |
| 2006 | Push | Paul | feature film |
| 2006-2007 | Kidnapped | Otto | TV series, 10 episodes |
| 2007 | Criminal Minds | Deputy Rick Siglock | TV series, 1 episode |
| 2007 | Manhunt 2 | Perv (voice) | Video game |
| 2008 | Canterbury's Law | Danny Santos | TV series, 1 episode |
| 2009 | Law & Order | Westside Express Employee | TV series, 1 episode |
| 2009 | Law & Order: Criminal Intent | Det. Gonzo Ruiz | TV series, 1 episode |
| 2009 | Burn Notice | Diego Garza | TV series, 4 episodes |
| 2011 | Blue Bloods | Diego | TV series, 2 episodes |
| 2011 | Curb Your Enthusiasm | Mugger | TV series, 1 episode |
| 2012 | Person of Interest | Ochoa | TV series, Episode: "Triggerman" |
| 2014 | Unforgettable | Dudek | TV series, 1 episode |
| 2015 | Girls | Joralemon | TV series, 1 episode |
| 2015 | Terminator Genisys | Detective Timmons | feature film |
| 2015 | Gotham | Odgen Barker | TV series, Episode: "Damned If You Do..." |
| 2015 | The Blacklist | Michael Carpus | TV series, 1 episode |
| 2015 | My Name Is David | | feature film |
| 2016 | Shades of Blue | Raul Mendez | TV series, 2 episodes |
| 2016 | Elementary | Renny Trautman | TV series, 1 episode |
| 2016 | The Pearl | Louis Rivera | TV movie |
| 2018 | Red Dead Redemption 2 | Del Lobos Gang | Video game |
| 2018 | Luke Cage | Arturo Rey "El Ray" III | TV series, Episode: "Soul Brother #1" |
