= Side Quest (TV series) =

- Promotional poster
- Genre: Anthology; Comedy
- Created by: Ashly Burch; John Howell Harris; Katie McElhenney
- Composer: Takeshi Furukawa
- Country of origin: United States
- Original language: English
- No. of seasons: 1
- No. of episodes: 4

Production
- Executive producers: Ashly Burch; John Howell Harris; Katie McElhenney; Todd Biermann; Rob McElhenney; Megan Ganz; David Hornsby; Charlie Day; Nicholas Frenkel; Michael Rotenberg; Margaret Boykin; Genevieve Jones
- Producers: Jeff Luini; Natasha Kanury; Nicole Beaudoin
- Cinematography: Tarin Anderson
- Editor: Elizabeth Praino
- Running time: 28–34 minutes
- Production companies: RCG Productions; 3 Arts Entertainment; Ubisoft Film & Television; Lionsgate Television

Original release
- Network: Apple TV+
- Release: March 26, 2025

Related
- Mythic Quest

Side Quest is an American anthology comedy television miniseries created by Ashly Burch, John Howell Harris, and Katie McElhenney for Apple TV+. The series serves as a spin-off of the television series Mythic Quest and released all four episodes on March 26, 2025. It received generally favorable reviews.

== Premise ==
In an anthology format, each episode explores the lives of employees, players, and fans of the video game Mythic Quest.

== Episodes ==
No.	Title	Directed by	Written by	Original release date
1	"Song and Dance"	Todd Biermann	Ashly Burch & John Howell Harris & Katie McElhenney	March 26, 2025
Cast: Derek Waters as Phil Birch, Anna Konkle as Maude, Rob McElhenney as Ian Grimm
2	"Pull List"	Maurice Marable	Leann Bowen & Javier Scott	March 26, 2025
Cast: Shalita Grant as Janae, Rome Flynn as Mike, William Stanford Davis as Earl, Bria Samoné Henderson as Cherry, Ramon Reed as Dominic, Leonard Robinson as Jared, Gary Kraus as Duncan
3	"Fugue"	Todd Biermann	Ashly Burch & John Howell Harris & Katie McElhenney	March 26, 2025
Cast: Annamarie Kasper as Sylvie, Esai Morales as Gustavo, Asjha Cooper as Kourtney
4	"The Last Raid"	Will Speck and Josh Gordon	Ashly Burch & John Howell Harris & Katie McElhenney	March 26, 2025
Cast: Van Crosby as Devon, Melanie Brook as Sorisana / Kelly, Alice Wen as Rory, David Andrew Calvillo as Seth, Justin Jarzombek as Freddie, Dash McCloud as Ben

== Production ==
=== Development ===
On December 15, 2022, it was announced that Apple TV+ ordered Mere Mortals, an eight-episode companion series created and written by Ashly Burch, John Howell Harris, and Katie McElhenney. The series features new characters and focuses on the lives of employees, players, and fans of the game Mythic Quest. The series was compared to the stand-alone episodes from Mythic Quest, such as "A Dark Quiet Death" and "Backstory!". On November 14, 2024, the series was reannounced with its new title Side Quest and that it would consist of four episodes.

=== Casting ===
In the series announcement on November 14, 2022, it was announced that Rob McElhenney and Derek Waters would reprise their Mythic Quest roles as Ian Grimm and Phil, respectively. Other actors announced include Anna Konkle, William Stanford Davis, Bria Henderson, Rome Flynn, Leonard Robinson, Gary Kraus, Annamarie Kasper, Esai Morales, and Shalita Grant.

== Release ==
The first trailer for the series was released on February 28, 2025. All four episodes of the series premiered on March 26, 2025 on Apple TV+, the same day as the fourth season finale of Mythic Quest.

== Reception ==
On the review aggregator website Rotten Tomatoes, Side Quest has an approval rating of 86% based on 14 critics' reviews. The website's consensus reads, "A modest spinoff of Mythic Quest, this amiable anthology very much feels like an optional add-on but a breezily bingable one at that." Metacritic, which uses a weighted average, assigned a score of 66 out of 100, based on seven critics, indicating "generally favorable" reviews.
