= Leonard Robinson =

American actor

- Born: Cleveland, Ohio, U.S.
- Education: Howard University (BS)
- Occupations: Actor; comedian; writer; performer
- Years active: 2004–present

Leonard Robinson is an American actor, comedian, writer and performer.

== Early life ==
Leonard Robinson was born in Cleveland, Ohio, and raised in Danbury, Connecticut. He is a 1994 graduate of Danbury High School, where he was a Class LL state champion wrestler. Robinson gained early inspiration to pursue acting from watching Sesame Street.

== Education ==
Robinson attended Howard University, where he graduated with a business degree in Management Information Systems. He took his first formal acting courses while attending Howard.

== Career ==
After graduating from Howard University, Robinson worked as a tech consultant, and later moved to New York City to pursue roles in theater and stand-up. In the mid-2000s he moved to Los Angeles. His television debut was on the MTV’s improv game show, Wild ‘n Out, where he would perform over the course of four seasons as an original cast member with comedians such as Katt Williams and Randall Park.

Robinson also appeared in theaters nationwide including "The Exonerated" at The Culture Project (Off-Broadway), Williamstown Theatre Festival, New York Fringe Festival, and Studio Theatre in Washington, DC. He later studied improv at the world-famous Upright Citizen’s Brigade Theatre and IO West and was a participant in the NBC Stand-Up for Diversity.

As a writer, Leonard developed the treatment for Lil Jon and LMFAO’s “Drink” music video, which has over 7 million views on YouTube alone. In 2019, Leonard was selected to participate in the prestigious CBS Diversity Sketch Comedy Showcase as part of their first writer’s room. Today, Leonard is a main company member at The Groundlings where he writes, directs, and performs. He is also a regular at The World Famous Comedy Store, and has performed his stand-up abroad throughout the U.K.

In 2018, Robinson joined the cast of Insecure in its third season as Taurean, a role he would continue into the show's final season. Robinson had auditioned for multiple roles in Insecure, including Lawrence in the show's pilot, before being cast as Taurean. He was chosen directly by show runner Prentice Penny for the role.

== Filmography ==
=== Film ===
Year	Title	Role	Notes
2004	Au Pair Chocolat	Deputy John	TV movie
2005	Filmic Achievement	Xavier Robert Reynolds	
2005	Mr. & Mrs. Smith	Watchguard	
2008	American Crude	Cop No. 4	TV movie
2009	Repunzel	Prince Charming	Short
2010	Dumb Professor	Henry Louis Gates Jr.	Short
2010	Speed-Dating	Beaver	
2011	The Return of King Hippo	Doc	Short
2012	Freaky Deaky	Juicy Mouth	
2012	Touching Ourselves	Himself	Short
2013	Baby Mentalist	Ezekiel Jackson	Short
2013	Life of Crime	Officer Dixon	
2013	Project Tennessee	Mike	Short
2014	Bagels: The Movie	Himself	Short
2014	Coffee Shop Girl	Davis	Short
2016	Undefeated	Tre	Short
2017	Magic '85	Trevor	Short
2021	Queenpins	Barry	
2023	Re-Opening	Jackson Foxx'e	

=== Television ===
Year	Title	Role	Notes
2005	All That	Himself	Episode: "American Hi-Fi"
2005–07	Nick Cannon Presents: Wild 'n Out	Himself/Cast Member	Main Cast: seasons 1–4
2006	America's Next Top Model	Himself	Episode: "The Girl with Two Bad Takes"
2007	Nick Cannon Presents: Short Circuitz	Himself/Cast Member	Main Cast
2007	The Bronx Is Burning	Mickey Rivers	Main Cast
2009	The League	Leonard	Episode: "The Usual Bet"
2010	Criminal Minds	Joe	Episode: "The Uncanny Valley"
2011	Law & Order: Los Angeles	Officer Meade	Episode: "East Pasadena"
2011	The Protector	Jamal	Episode: "Beef"
2011	Death Valley	Annoying Dad	Episode: "Tick... Tick... BOOM!"
2011	Million Dollar Mind Game	Video Question Talent	Episode: "Episode #1.5"
2011	NCIS	Metro Police Officer Jackson	Episode: "Sins of the Father"
2012	Parks and Recreation	Officer Golis	Episode: "Bus Tour"
2012	NCIS: Los Angeles	Marine Staff Sergeant Jefferies	Episode: "Free Ride"
2013	Wilfred	Andre	Episode: "Confrontation"
2013	Don't Talk in the Kitchen Presents	Casting Assistant	Episode: "Harry's Haunted Hayride: The Audition Tapes"
2014–15	CollegeHumor Originals	Various Roles	Recurring Guest
2015	Keith Broke His Leg	Himself	Recurring Cast
2016	NCIS	Metro Police Officer Jackson	Episode: "Déjà Vu"
2016	Bad Internet	-	Episode: "Uber, But Like for People"
2016	Adam Ruins Everything	Officiant/Priest	Episode: "Adam Ruins Weddings" & "Adam Ruins Animals"
2016	Rosewood	Handsome Chess Player	Episode: "Lidocaine and Long-Term Lust"
2017	Colony	Alec	Episode: "Sublimation"
2017	Young Sheldon	FBI Agent #2	Episode: "Rockets, Communists, and the Dewey Decimal System"
2018	Alexa & Katie	Bennet	Episode: "The Play: Part 2"
2018	Rel	Bill the Pedicab Driver	Episode: "One Night Stand"
2018–21	Insecure	Taurean Jackson	Recurring Cast: seasons 3–5
2022	Kenan	Keith	Episode: "Ghosts of Boyfriends Past"
2022	The Blank's YPF	Billy	Episode: "Week 3 (2022)"
2022	Blockbuster	Aaron Walker	Recurring Cast
2023	Welcome to Flatch	Geoffrey	Episode: "Flatch: Churn Here"
2023	American Dad!	Dean Barkov (voice)	Episode: "The Professor and the Coach"
2023	A Black Lady Sketch Show	Craigarious	Episode: "What Kind of Medicine Does Dr. King Practice?"
2023	Platonic	Lord Rotero	Episode: "Let the River Run"
2025	Side Quest	Jared	Episode: "Pull List"
