= Winterthorne =

- Season 1 main title
- Created by: Michael Caruso
- Written by: Michael Caruso
- Directed by: Sonia Blangiardo
- Starring: Martha Madison; Michael Caruso; Gordon Thomson; Josh Thrower; Kevin Spirtas; John-Paul Lavoisier
- Country of origin: United States
- Original language: English
- No. of seasons: 1
- No. of episodes: 4

Production
- Executive producers: Michael Caruso; Barbara Caruso
- Cinematography: Rodolphe Portier
- Production companies: Michael & Barbara Caruso Productions; Suchagooddog LLC

Original release
- Release: August 27 – September 18, 2015

Related
- DeVanity

Winterthorne is a soap opera web series that premiered on August 27, 2015. Starring Martha Madison as Miranda Winterthorne, the ruthless matriarch of a candy dynasty, the series was created, written and executive produced by Michael Caruso. Caruso previously created the web soap DeVanity, which ran from 2011 to 2014.

In 2016, Winterthorne received a Daytime Emmy Award nomination for Outstanding Digital Daytime Drama Series. Kathleen Gati was nominated for Outstanding Actress in a Digital Daytime Drama Series for her portrayal of Valentina Winterthorne, and Kevin Spirtas was nominated for Outstanding Actor in a Digital Daytime Drama Series for playing Dominic Delacort. The series has also won several Indie Series Awards.

== Plot ==
Miranda is the cold, ruthless head of the Winterthorne candy empire. Her marriage is in shambles, she is estranged from her son and their lives are all in danger. But it was not always this way. A decade earlier, naive Miranda's eyes were opened to her family's best kept secrets, and their violent treachery. Her only means to secure the survival of her loved ones and her livelihood has been to embrace the dark, cruel and murderous heart of a Winterthorne.

== Cast ==
Cast of Winterthorne (Clockwise from upper left: Gati, Madison, Gray, Caruso, Thrower, Lavoisier, Madison and Caruso, Spirtas, Storms and Thomson)

=== Main ===
- Martha Madison as Miranda Winterthorne
- Michael Caruso as Victor Winterthorne, Miranda's husband
- Gordon Thomson as Maxmillian Winterthorne, Miranda's father
- Josh Thrower as Colin Winterthorne, Miranda and Victor's son
- Kevin Spirtas as Dominic Delacort, the trainer of Winterthorne men
- John-Paul Lavoisier as Hugh Cambridge, Miranda's former fiancé

=== Guest ===
- Linda Gray as Joanna Winterthorne, Miranda's mother
- Kathleen Gati as Valentina Winterthorne, Miranda's aunt and Joanna's sister
- Kirsten Storms as Selene Winterthorne, Miranda's sister
- Ron Hanks as Jelly Bean Jim, Dominic's son
- Conrad Bluth as Young Colin

== Concept ==
Taking place over a 10-year time span, the first season of Winterthorne chronicles the rise of Miranda as the leader of the Winterthorne candy dynasty, with "a modern storyline that runs parallel with flashbacks". Jamey Giddens of Daytime Confidential described the series as "a story about smartly-dressed, witch-like beings who use 'nature' to create candy so addictive it leads to a multi-million dollar empire and men groveling at their feet". Of the candy empire concept, Caruso said, "I thought it would be fun to take something very innocent and happy on the surface and add a very dark undercurrent to it, and kind of create a family that used something like this as a front for something much deeper and scarier." He noted, "There is something in the candy, and that’s really the core of this show." Caruso added:

The other switcharoo that we did ... is that this is a family that is run by women. Women have complete control and power in this mini-micro world. In typical television, we see the men run the family, and the women being nurturing and supportive. We flipped all of that. The women are in power, and the men stay at home and take care of the kids. This is a way of kind of celebrating the power of women, and being able to show the many layers of what they are capable of doing."

Setting up the first season, Caruso explained that the Winterthorne family has "reached a crossroads ... Martha's complicated character, Miranda, is taking over, and we'll see over the course of four episodes where she started from and some of the good and not-so-good choices she's made in order to control her family."

== Casting and production ==
Having previously created the web soap DeVanity (2011–14), Caruso announced Winterthorne in November 2014, describing the series as "a classic soap with light touches of gothic whimsy" that would be "dark, sexy, glamorous, and a visual feast". Madison had been cast in the lead role of Miranda Winterthorne, ruthless leader of a candy empire, with Thomson as Miranda's father Maxmillian and Caruso himself set to play her husband Victor. With production scheduled to begin in Spring 2015, Caruso also announced the addition of director Sonia Blangiardo, who had previously won a Daytime Emmy Award as a director for As the World Turns and another as a producer for One Life to Live.

In February 2015, it was announced that Gray had been cast as Miranda's mother, Joanna Winterthorne. Caruso said of Gray, "Her character is so important, and really sets everything in motion for, not only the season, but the rest of the series." He noted, "Linda has a warmth and strength that embodies Joanna ... [I] wrote this part specifically for her." Next cast were Gati as Joanna's power-hungry sister Valentina, and Storms as Miranda's estranged sister Selene. Spirtas and Lavoisier were later added to the cast as Hugh Cambridge and Dominic Delacort respectively, and Ron Hanks as Jelly Bean Jim.

An April 2015 Indiegogo crowdfunding campaign partially funded season 1 of Winterthorne. The series is executive produced by Caruso and his wife Barbara "Barbi" Caruso, with Steve Silverman of Suchagooddog LLC, Jim Cannella and Martha Madison as co-executive producers. The series began a three-week production schedule in late March 2015 in the Los Angeles area. Some of Winterthorne was shot on location in Idyllwild (near Palm Springs, California).

== Episodes ==
No.	Title	Directed by	Written by	Original release date	Length
1	"Part I"	Sonia Blangiardo	Michael Caruso	August 27, 2015	24:43
Icy Miranda controls the Winterthorne candy empire with an iron fist. But she was not always a cold bitch; there was a time when she chose Victor, the servant she loved, over the dashing Hugh, who had been groomed to be her husband. Miranda and Victor's life together was a wonderful one, until their son Colin turned 16. Miranda's mother Joanna had warned her that Miranda's self-indulgent aunts were presenting themselves as a dangerous threat, and Joanna sacrificed herself to give Miranda time to prepare. Now, after having made dark choices, ruthless Miranda's marriage is in shambles and she is estranged from her son, but she is ready to face her enemies.
2	"Part II"	Sonia Blangiardo	Michael Caruso	September 4, 2015	27:38
Victor is both excited and worried about Colin's return. Meanwhile, Miranda remembers her confrontation years before with her aunt Valentina, who had revealed much of their family's past but then attempted to kill a naive Miranda. Maxmillian had strangled Valentina with red licorice, and advised Miranda that they make her into candy to be sent to the rest of the family as a warning. Sometime later, Miranda had fled into the woods, finding sanctuary with Dominic Delacort.
3	"Part III"	Sonia Blangiardo	Michael Caruso	September 11, 2015	27:33
After a fiery reunion, Miranda tells Colin how Valentina's daughters had retaliated, in search of the priceless winterthorne seeds: Maxmillian had been imprisoned and starved, Victor had been tortured and Miranda had been chased into the woods. Telling Miranda that her father and husband were dead, Dominic had drugged her to erase her memories, and used Hugh to manipulate her into relinquishing the seeds. Turning the tables on Dominic, Miranda had learned the secret of natural winterthorne: it slows aging.
4	"Part IV"	Sonia Blangiardo	Michael Caruso	September 18, 2015	19:05
In the past, a vengeful Miranda had confronted Hugh in search of the seeds, and ended up stabbing him to death with a lollipop stick. She then planted the seeds in the woods, and awoke to find full grown plants. In present day, Colin decides to rejoin the family. Miranda's sister Selene reappears, sent with an offer from their aunt Corinne: in exchange for the winterthorne, Corinne will promise peace, and a cure for Victor's crippled hands. Miranda agrees, but then chokes her sister to death with a winterthorne-covered peppermint stick instead. Miranda intends to send Selene's severed head to Corinne, and is ready to face whatever retribution her remaining aunts have in store. In the woods, a hand pulls a winterthorne plant out of the ground.

== Broadcast and reception ==
A trailer for Winterthorne was released May 2015, with an extended version following in July 2015. The series had a red carpet premiere at the Renberg Theater in Los Angeles on August 16, 2015. Billed as a "four-part online event", the series debuted at Winterthorne.com on August 27, 2015. The remaining three episodes of season 1 were released weekly on Fridays, starting September 4, 2015.

In May 2015, Luke Kerr of Daytime Confidential wrote that the initial preview trailer featured "big screen production values (we expect nothing less from Caruso & Co.), fantastic fashion, epic drama and a drizzle of Pushing Daisies-style mythology". Calling the series "highly anticipated", Michael Fairman noted, "The sweeping epic look, and the fantastical images and costumes have become staples of Caruso’s work, and this series looks to be where all those production values come together in the most spectacular way." Daytime Confidential's Jamey Giddens wrote of the extended trailer, "My blood sugar has gone straight through the stratosphere after just a sampling of the delicious, high calorie confections creator and star Michael Caruso (DeVanity) is offering up in his new soap opera Winterthorne." Giddens later wrote of the first episode, "Produced on a shoe-string budget, Winterthorne boasts cinematography, establishing shots, scene and wardrobe design that puts every current daytime soap airing to shame, with the exception of The Bold and the Beautiful. Winterthorne also brings it where it matters most to soap fans—in the story department." Kevin Mulcahy Jr. of We Love Soaps wrote of episode two, "A compelling script, beautiful scenery, gorgeous clothes and soap stars galore make for fun viewing on any screen. But beware of deadly licorice!"

=== Awards and nominations ===
In 2016, Winterthorne received a Daytime Emmy Award nomination for Outstanding Digital Daytime Drama Series. Kathleen Gati was nominated for Outstanding Actress in a Digital Daytime Drama Series for her portrayal of Valentina Winterthorne, and Kevin Spirtas was nominated for Outstanding Actor in a Digital Daytime Drama Series for playing Dominic Delacort.

The series received a record-tying 13 Indie Series Award nominations, and won three.

Year	Award	Category	Nominee(s)	Result	Ref.
2016	43rd Daytime Creative Arts Emmy Awards	Outstanding Digital Daytime Drama Series	Michael Caruso, Barbara Caruso, Steve Silverman, Jim Cannella, Martha Madison	Nominated	
2016	43rd Daytime Creative Arts Emmy Awards	Outstanding Actress in a Digital Daytime Drama Series	Kathleen Gati as Valentina Winterthorne	Nominated	
2016	43rd Daytime Creative Arts Emmy Awards	Outstanding Actor in a Digital Daytime Drama Series	Kevin Spirtas as Dominic Delacort	Nominated	
2016	7th Indie Series Awards	Best Web Series — Drama		Nominated	
2016	7th Indie Series Awards	Best Directing — Drama	Sonia Blangiardo	Nominated	
2016	7th Indie Series Awards	Best Writing — Drama	Michael Caruso	Won	
2016	7th Indie Series Awards	Best Lead Actress — Drama	Martha Madison as Miranda Winterthorne	Nominated	
2016	7th Indie Series Awards	Best Supporting Actor — Drama	Gordon Thomson as Maxmillian Winterthorne	Nominated	
2016	7th Indie Series Awards	Best Guest Actor — Drama	John-Paul Lavoisier as Hugh Cambridge	Nominated	
2016	7th Indie Series Awards	Best Guest Actor — Drama	Kevin Spirtas as Dominic Delacort	Won	
2016	7th Indie Series Awards	Best Guest Actress — Drama	Kathleen Gati as Valentina Winterthorne	Nominated	
2016	7th Indie Series Awards	Best Guest Actress — Drama	Linda Gray as Joanna Winterthorne	Nominated	
2016	7th Indie Series Awards	Best Ensemble – Drama		Nominated	
2016	7th Indie Series Awards	Best Cinematography	Rodolphe Portier	Nominated	
2016	7th Indie Series Awards	Best Makeup	Jen Fregozo and James Freitas	Nominated	
2016	7th Indie Series Awards	Best Production Design	Michael Caruso and Barbara Caruso	Won	
