= Double Whammy (film) =

2001 film by Tom DiCillo

- Directed by: Tom DiCillo
- Written by: Tom DiCillo
- Produced by: Jim Serpico
- Starring: Denis Leary; Elizabeth Hurley; Luis Guzmán; Donald Faison; Steve Buscemi; Melonie Diaz
- Cinematography: Robert Yeoman
- Production companies: Apostle; Gold Circle Films; Myriad Pictures
- Distributed by: Lionsgate
- Release dates: January 20, 2001 (Sundance); December 31, 2002 (DVD)
- Running time: 93 min
- Language: English
- Budget: $5 million

Double Whammy is a 2001 crime comedy drama film written and directed by Tom DiCillo, and starring Denis Leary, Elizabeth Hurley and Steve Buscemi. Although intended to be released in theaters, it was ultimately distributed direct-to-video.

== Plot ==
Ray Pluto is a New York City police detective who failed to stop a shooting spree at a burger joint because his back gave out and he fell. The suspect ended up being shot by a bystander, a young boy. The incident has made Ray a laughing stock in the city. He's also haunted by memories of his wife and child dying in a traffic accident. While Ray is put on limited duty until he is declared medically fit, he retreats to his couch to smoke marijuana. Still, he is persuaded to seek treatment for his back by seeing Dr. Ann Beamer, a chiropractor. A romance blossoms between the two. Meanwhile, Pluto's partner, Detective Jerry Cubbins, has decided to come out of the closet.

A variety of tenants live in Ray's West Side apartment building, including Cletis and Duke, two young men who want to write a Quentin Tarantino-esque movie script, and rebellious teenager Maribel who hires thugs to kill her father Juan, who is also the super of the building. Ray discovers the plot on Juan and must get past his grief to prevent the murder.

== Cast ==
- Denis Leary as Detective Ray Pluto
- Elizabeth Hurley as Dr. Ann Beamer
- Steve Buscemi as Detective Jerry Cubbins
- Melonie Diaz as Maribel Benitez
- Luis Guzmán as Juan Benitez
- Donald Faison as Cletis
- Victor Argo as Lieutenant Spigot
- Chris Noth as Detective Chick Dimitri
- Keith Nobbs as Duke
- Maurice Compte as Joe "Jo-Jo"
- Otto Sanchez as "Ping Pong"
- Kevin Olson as Ricky Lapinsky
- Bill Boggs as Bill Berman
- Gerry Bamman as The Mayor
- Sally Jessy Raphael as Herself
- Sharon Wilkins as Techa
- Caprice Benedetti as Shelley

== Production ==
Financing for the film was a difficult process for writer and director Tom DiCillo. Nick Nolte, Jeff Bridges, and Michael Keaton were all considered for the role of Ray, but DiCillo insisted on Denis Leary for the part. With Leary and Elizabeth Hurley attached to the project, DiCillo still could not secure funding and was turned down by multiple mini-major studios like Sony Pictures Classics, Fine Line Features, The Shooting Gallery, Fox Searchlight, and Lions Gate Films. Distributors said the film did not fit into any recognizable genre and would be difficult to market. DiCillo eventually found financiers in Gold Circle Films, who agreed to put up $4 million of the film's budget. Myriad Pictures also paid Gold Circle for the foreign distribution rights to the film, which helped the production recoup its budget.

DiCillo said the film was "in reaction to some of the ways people had responded to my films. When the lieutenant says at the beginning, 'Do I have your attention now?,' that's me asking, 'Is that what it takes to get your attention, to have some guy walk into a burger joint and blow people away? Is that what it takes?' I don't see this as just a cop movie. It's about how our emotional life can keep us from seeing things."

== Release ==
The film premiered on January 20, 2001, at the Sundance Film Festival. It also screened at the 2001 Tribeca Festival. At the Sundance screening, DiCillo criticized distributors as "the sleaziest, freakiest people I have ever encountered in the business". Two days later, Lions Gate, who had previously rejected the film in its script stage, bought the North American rights for $1 million, with another one million committed for marketing expenses. Lions Gate's then-president Mark Urman planned for a theatrical release to 40 theaters in the fall of 2001. "About two weeks after we made the deal, Mark Urman left the company. Two weeks after that, Dave Kronemyer was forced out of Gold Circle," said DiCillo. Lions Gate ultimately decided to not theatrically release the film and it was released straight-to-DVD on December 31, 2002.

The film was released in France under the title "Bad Luck".

== Reception ==
The film holds a 30% approval rating on Rotten Tomatoes based on 10 reviews, with an average rating of 4.4/10.

David Rooney of Variety wrote DiCillo's "brand of offbeat humor provide enough charm to help weather the erratic [marriage] of suspense, black comedy and romance. DiCillo has fashioned a lightweight vehicle that never ventures confidently enough in any of those directions. While the material is not uproariously funny, it remains appealing thanks chiefly to Leary’s effortless charisma, guiding world-weary Ray from despondency and humiliation to a point where he eventually can forgive himself for the past." TV Guide wrote, "Though the narrative thumps along like sneakers in a dryer, this offbeat crime comedy is a fine example of a film in which humor doesn't come at the expense of the characters.
