= Martha Madison =

American actress (born 1977)

- Born: Martha Anne Butterworth; July 27, 1977 (age 49); Newport News, Virginia, U.S.
- Occupation: Actress
- Years active: 2001–present
- Spouse: A.J. Gilbert (m. 2007)
- Children: 1

Martha Madison (born Martha Anne Butterworth; July 27, 1977) is an American actress best known for her portrayal of Belle Black on the NBC soap opera Days of Our Lives.

== Early life and education ==
Madison was born in Newport News, Virginia, and raised in Houston, Texas. She attended Cypress Creek High School. In 1999, she graduated from Texas A&M University, where she was also the captain of the dance team, with a degree in psychology.

== Career ==
=== Film and television ===
Madison had a minor role in the film Kate & Leopold (2001). In 2003, she moved to Los Angeles to pursue an acting career. She briefly appeared on the NBC soap opera Passions in 2004.

From 2004 to 2008, Madison played Belle Black on the NBC soap opera Days of Our Lives. In 2007, she appeared on and episode of The Tyra Banks Show to help model/host Tyra Banks through "soap opera school." In 2008, she appeared in the Without a Trace episode "Rewind", and in the Criminal Minds episode "The Big Wheel" in 2009. From 2010 to 2014, Madison appeared on the soap opera web series The Bay as Marly Nelson-Foster.

In June 2011, Madison temporarily took over the role as Elizabeth Webber on General Hospital. She and General Hospital's Lilly Melgar currently co-hosted SoapBox with Lilly and Martha.

In 2015, Madison began starring as Miranda Winterthorne in the soap opera web series Winterthorne. She returned Days of Our Lives later in the year.

== Personal life ==
Madison announced her engagement to restaurateur A.J. Gilbert on July 29, 2006. The couple married on August 25, 2007. On November 3, 2013, she gave birth to their daughter.

=== Philanthropy and activities ===
In 2005, Madison was named an ambassador for the Multiple Sclerosis Foundation and helped re-design their website. At the time, her mother had been living with multiple sclerosis for nearly 25 years.

== Filmography ==
Year	Film	Role	Notes
2001	Kate & Leopold	Office Woman	
2003	Law & Order: Criminal Intent	Susan Watkins	Episode: "Cherry Red"
2004	Passions	Lola	April 8–14, 2004
2004–2008, 2015–2023	Days of Our Lives	Isabella "Belle" Black	August 10, 2004 – March 24, 2008, November 25, 2015 – September 12, 2016, January 24 – February 20, 2017, December 4, 2017 – March 27, 2018, August 21 – November 8, 2018, March 18 – July 9, 2019, June 8, 2020 – November 9, 2023, November 8, 2024, December 2, 2024–present
2006	Biker Mice from Mars	Catalina Cat/Cataina Mouse (voice)	Episodes: "New Cats in Town" and "The Tender Mouse Trap"
2007	The Singles Table	Married woman	Episode: "The Work Dinner"
2008	Without a Trace	Jolie	Episode: "Rewind"
2009	Criminal Minds	Kate	Episode: "The Big Wheel"
2009	The Mother of Invention	Chandra	
2011	General Hospital	Elizabeth Webber # 2	Temporary recast: June 8–20, 2011
2011	Undercover Bridesmaid	Sally	Television film
2010–14	The Bay	Marly Nelson-Foster	26 episodes
2015	Winterthorne	Miranda Winterthorne	4 episodes
2016	One Mississippi	Bibby Baxter	Episodes: "The Cat's Out", "Let the Good Times Roll"
2016	Ladies of the Lake	Vivian Montgomery	4 episodes
2017	Great News	Belle Black	Episode: "War Is Hell"
2018	To The Beat!	Clare	Also associate producer
2018	The Price for Silence	Deana	
2019	A Place Called Hollywood	Sissy Satire	3 episodes
2019-2020	Days of Our Lives: Last Blast Reunion	Belle Black	Web Series

== Awards and nominations ==
Year	Award	Category	Work	Result	Ref.
2016	Indie Series Awards	Best Lead Actress - Drama	Winterthorne	Nominated	
2019	Daytime Emmy Award	Outstanding Supporting Actress in a Drama Series	Days of Our Lives	Nominated	
