= Dustin Ybarra =

American stand-up comedian and actor (born 1986)

- Born: July 19, 1986 (age 40); San Antonio, Texas, U.S.
- Occupations: Actor, comedian
- Years active: 2009–present
- Website: weenietips.com

Dustin Ybarra (born July 19, 1986) is an American stand-up comedian and actor. He is known for his role as Tyler Medina in Kevin (Probably) Saves the World, and roles in We Bought a Zoo and Hop.

Ybarra's career began with stand-up comedy performances in Texas, where he was a finalist in the Funniest Dallas Comic and Funniest Comic in Texas competitions.

== Early life ==
Ybarra was born in San Antonio, Texas. He lived in New Braunfels, Austin, and Daingerfield before graduating from Trinity High School (Euless, Texas).

== Filmography ==
=== Film ===
| Year | Title | Role | Notes |
|---|---|---|---|
| 2011 | Balls to the Wall | Lewis Gardener | |
| 2011 | Hop | Cody | |
| 2011 | We Bought a Zoo | Nathan | |
| 2013 | 21 & Over | PJ Bril | |
| 2014 | Date and Switch | Josh | |
| 2015 | Ted 2 | Borg | |
| 2019 | Us | Troy / Brand | |
| 2022 | Easter Sunday | Alfonso | |
| 2025 | One of Them Days | Joseph | |
| 2026 | The Second Coming of John Cooper | Dubs | |
| TBA | Untitled Stephen Merchant film | | Filming |

=== Television ===
| Year | Title | Role | Notes |
|---|---|---|---|
| 2009 | Live at Gotham | himself | Season 4, episode 402 |
| 2012 | King of Van Nuys | Rodney | pilot, remake of Only Fools and Horses |
| 2012 | Gabriel Iglesias Presents Stand Up Revolution | himself | Season 2, episode 4 |
| 2013 | Californication | Ross | 3 episodes |
| 2013–14 | Us & Them | Archie | 7 episodes |
| 2014 | Chelsea Lately | himself - Round table | 5 episodes |
| 2014–15 | The Goldbergs | Nitrous | 3 episodes |
| 2015 | Gotham | Robert Greenwood | 2 episodes (Damned If You Do... and Knock, Knock (Gotham)) |
| 2017–18 | Kevin (Probably) Saves the World | Tyler Medina | 16 episodes |
| 2019 | Elena of Avalor | Nacho (voice) | Episode: "Changing of the Guards" |
| 2019 | Rick and Morty | Danny Publitz (voice) | Episode: "The Old Man and the Seat" |
| 2021–22 | Home Economics | Spags | 2 episodes: "Mermaid Taffeta Wedding Dress, $1,999" and "Poker Game $800 Buy-In" |
| 2021–22 | M.O.D.O.K. | Anthony Rodriguez / Armadillo (voice) | 2 episodes |
| 2024 | The Tonight Show Starring Jimmy Fallon | Himself | |
| 2025 | Stick | Dog Sitter Passenger | 1 episode |
| 2025 | Ghosts | Gabe | 7 episodes |
