= Kill the Poor (film) =

- Theatrical release poster
- Directed by: Alan Taylor
- Screenplay by: Daniel Handler
- Based on: Kill the Poor by Joel Rose
- Produced by: Gary Winick; Alexis Alexnian; Ruth Charny; Lianne Halfon; John Malkovich; Russell Smith
- Starring: David Krumholtz; Clara Bellar; Paul Calderón; Jon Budinoff; Heather Burns; Zak Orth; Larry Gilliard Jr.; Otto Sanchez; Cliff Gorman; Damian Young
- Cinematography: Harlan Bosmajian
- Edited by: Malcolm Jamieson
- Music by: Anna Domino; Michel Delory
- Production companies: InDigEnt; Mr. Mudd
- Distributed by: IFC Films
- Release dates: May 9, 2003 (Tribeca Film Festival); January 6, 2006 (United States)
- Running time: 85 minutes
- Country: United States
- Language: English

Kill the Poor is a 2003 American drama film directed by Alan Taylor from a screenplay by Daniel Handler, based on the 1988 novel of the same name by Joel Rose. The film is set in Manhattan's Alphabet City in the early 1980s, when the neighborhood was a center of illegal drug activity. The film's title is inspired by the Dead Kennedys' song "Kill the Poor".

Kill the Poor premiered at the Tribeca Film Festival on May 9, 2003, and received a limited theatrical release in the United States on January 6, 2006, by IFC Films. It received mixed reviews from critics.

== Plot ==
Kill the Poor begins with a fire in the apartment of tough guy Carlos DeJesus and his trouble-making son, Segundo. The screenplay then focuses on the other tenants of the rundown building in an attempt to determine who set the blaze.

The other principals are:

- Joe Peltz, a young man who ignored his uncle's warnings to bring his wife Annabelle and their young child into the neighborhood where his Jewish grandparents had their start in America
- Spike, an aspiring found-object sculptor
- Delilah, a flamboyant gay man
- Butch, a presumptuous graduate student
- Scarlet, the tenement's resident floozy
- Negrito, a fixture in the neighborhood

A shared distrust of Carlos and Segundo unites this eclectic group and prompts them to hold "co-op" meetings with one goal: eviction of Carlos and Segundo DeJesus.

== Cast ==
- David Krumholtz as Joe Peltz
- Clara Bellar as Annabelle Peltz
- Paul Calderón as Carlos DeJesus
- Jon Budinoff as Segundo
- Cliff Gorman as Yakov
- Damian Young as Delilah
- Heather Burns as Scarlet
- Otto Sanchez as Negrito
- Zak Orth as Butch
- Larry Gilliard Jr. as "Spike"

== Release ==
Kill the Poor was first screened at the Tribeca Film Festival on May 9, 2003. It was then released on January 6, 2006, at the IFC Center in New York City.

== Reception ==
=== Critical response ===
The review aggregator website Rotten Tomatoes reported an approval rating of 25%, with an average rating of 5.3/10, based on 8 reviews.
