= Gordon Thomson (actor) =

Canadian actor (born 1945)

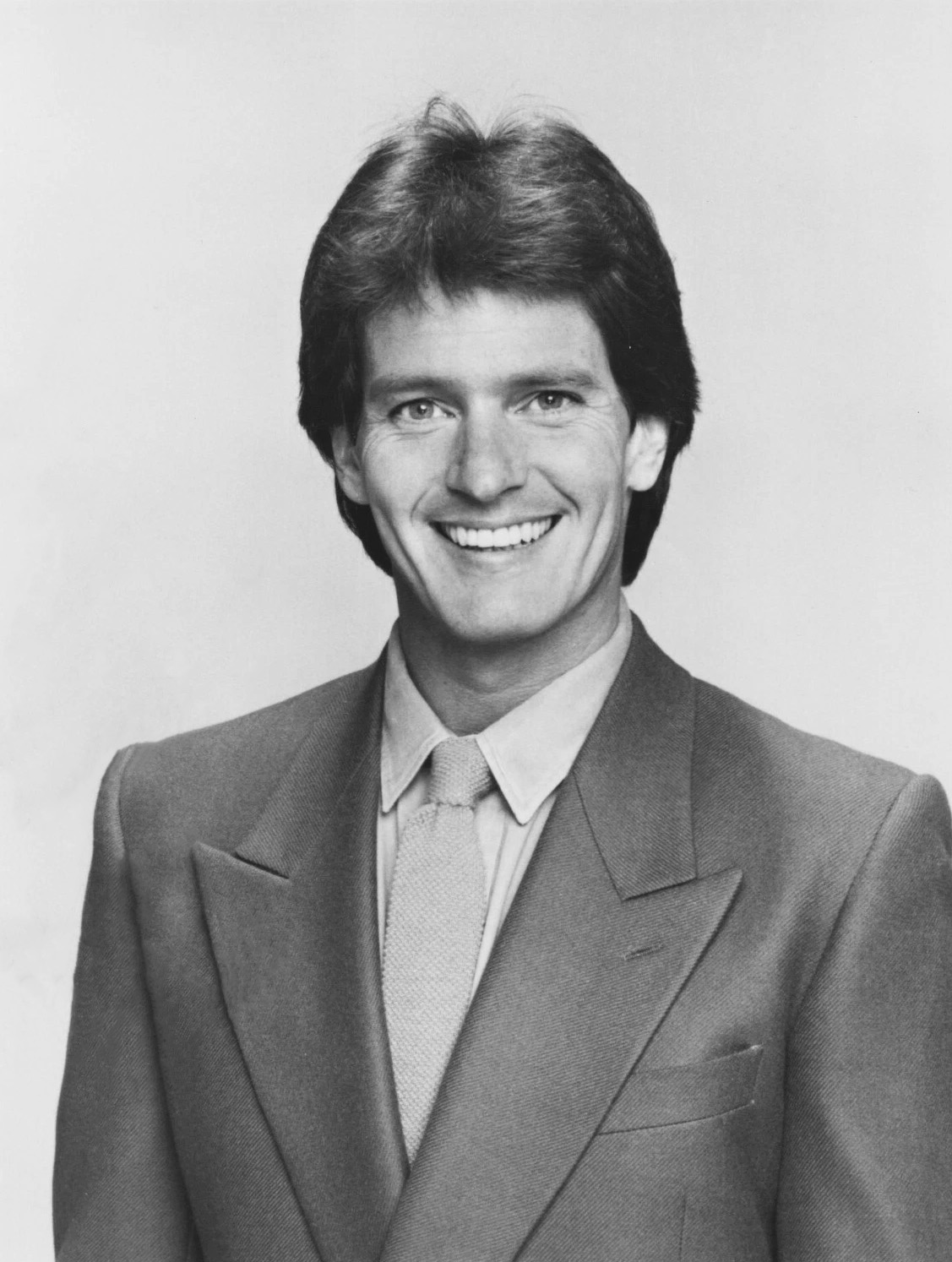
- Thomson in 1983
- Born: March 2, 1945 (age 81); Ottawa, Ontario, Canada
- Occupation: Actor
- Years active: 1969–present

Gordon Thomson (born March 2, 1945) is a Canadian actor widely known for his role as Adam Carrington on the 1980s American prime time soap opera Dynasty.

== Early life ==
Thomson began acting while studying English at McGill University in Montreal. One of his earliest roles was "Sir Robin the Brave" in the 1971 version of the Muppets' The Frog Prince. He went on to appear in Canadian television and stage roles, including a stint in Godspell opposite Gilda Radner, Martin Short, and Eugene Levy. In his twenties he also worked as a catalogue model to supplement his acting earnings.

== Career ==
His first main TV role was as Michael Stewart Jr. on the Canadian television serial High Hopes in 1978. He then appeared as Egyptologist Aristotle Benedict White on the ABC daytime soap opera Ryan's Hope from 1981 to 1982.

Having received acclaim for stage performances in productions including Love's Labour's Lost, Godspell and Joe Orton's Loot, Thomson advanced to the ABC Talent Development Program. After auditioning for a police series pilot called Callahan, he was instead cast as Dynasty's Adam Carrington. Thomson debuted on Dynasty in October 1982, and remained with the series until its cancellation in May 1989. This role brought Thomson nomination for Golden Globe Award for Best Supporting Actor – Series, Miniseries or Television Film in 1988. During the 1985–1986 season, Thomson also appeared in three episodes of the Dynasty spin-off, The Colbys.

After Dynasty, Thomson returned to daytime soaps. In 1990, he joined the now defunct series Santa Barbara (as the third actor to portray the character Mason Capwell). His commitment to Santa Barbara left him unable to reprise his role as Adam Carrington in the TV miniseries Dynasty: The Reunion (1991), and he was subsequently replaced by British actor Robin Sachs. Thomson had roles on The Young and the Restless, Passions, Sunset Beach, and in 2009, he appeared on Days of Our Lives.

Thomson appeared in eight different series produced by Aaron Spelling: Dynasty, Fantasy Island, Finder of Lost Loves, Glitter, The Love Boat, The Colbys, Beverly Hills, 90210 and Sunset Beach. He guest-starred in a variety of other series such as Murder, She Wrote, The Nanny and Silk Stalkings.

In recent years, Thomson reunited with his Dynasty co-stars in two non-fiction television specials; After Dynasty (part of the UK's After They Were Famous series) in 2002, and Dynasty Reunion: Catfights & Caviar in 2006. That same year, he had small roles in the feature films Poseidon (a remake of The Poseidon Adventure), and the Academy Award-nominated Little Miss Sunshine. From 2011, to 2014, Thomson appeared on the soap opera web series DeVanity, and in 2015 began starring as Maxmillian Winterthorne in the soap opera web series Winterthorne. In 2017, he played the role of Parker Rutledge, a ruthless Washington power player, in the Passionflix romantic drama film Afterburn Aftershock, based on The New York Times bestselling novel of the same name by Sylvia Day.

Thomson guest hosted for Britain's ITV network on their then breakfast show Good Morning Britain, for which he covered celebrity events such as Wimbledon and Royal Ascot.

== Partial filmography ==
Year	Title	Role	Notes	Source
2019	The Experience	Nick		
2019	The Young and the Restless	Daryl Tulane	3 episodes	
2017	Afterburn/Aftershock	Parker Rutledge		
2016	Ladies of the Lake	Sheraton Firestone	1 episode	
2015	Winterthorne	Maximilian Winterthorne	Main cast. 4 episodes	
2013	DeVanity	Preston Regis	5 episodes	
2009	Troublesome	Dr. Ross	Short movie	
2009	Days of Our Lives	Walter	5 episodes	
2008	Ladies of the House	Richard	TV movie	
2006	Poseidon	Jay	Based on Paul Gallico's novel The Poseidon Adventure and a loose remake of Ronald Neame's 1972 film The Poseidon Adventure	
2001	State of Grace	George	1 episode	
2001	Grosse Pointe	Dr. Evangelitis	1 episode	
2000	Passions	FBI Special agent Hal Freeman	3 episodes	
1998	Sunset Beach	A.J. Deschanel	227 episodes	
1998	Sunset Beach: Shockwave	A.J. Deschanel	TV movie	
1997	Man of Her Dreams	Leo Carson		
1997	Beverly Hills, 90210	Mr. Parish	2 episodes	
1997	High Tide	Dr. Paul Hughes	1 episode	
1997	Baywatch	Hunter Rose	1 episode	
1997	The Nanny	Chandler	1 episode	
1997	The Young and the Restless	Patrick Baker	1 episode	
1996	Hot Line	Earl	1 episode	
1996	Silk Stalkings	Joel Bayliss	1 episode	
1995	The Donor	Dr. Jonathan Cross		
1993	Family Passions	Mathias Haller	Credited to an unspecified number of episodes	
1990	Santa Barbara	Mason Capwell	360 episodes	
1990	Arrivederci Roma	Michael	Short movie, not to be confused with the 1958 Italian film Arrivederci Roma	
1990	Murder, She Wrote	Daniel McGuire/Kendall Stafford	1 episode in 1989 as Danie McGuire, 1 episode in 1990 as Kendall Stafford	
1990	Polkaroo's Birthday Party	Himself	TV special	

== Personal life ==
On September 25, 2017, Thomson came out as gay.
