= Jack Meets Dennis =

- 30 Rock episode
- Episode no.: Season 1 Episode 6
- Directed by: Juan J. Campanella
- Written by: Jack Burditt
- Production code: 105
- Original air date: November 30, 2006

Guest appearances
- Michael Blackson as African Man; Katrina Bowden as Cerie Xerox; Teddy Coluca as Stage Manager; Rachel Dratch as Elizabeth Taylor; Keith Powell as Toofer Spurlock; Ali Reza as Sandwich Guy; Lonny Ross as Josh Girard; Brian Stack as Jorgensen; Dean Winters as Dennis Duffy

Episode chronology
← Previous "Jack-Tor"	Next → "Tracy Does Conan"
- 30 Rock season 1

"Jack Meets Dennis" is the sixth episode of the first season of the American television comedy series 30 Rock. It was written by co-executive producer Jack Burditt, and directed by Juan J. Campanella. The episode originally aired on NBC in the United States on November 30, 2006. Guest stars in this episode include Michael Blackson, Katrina Bowden, Teddy Coluca, Rachel Dratch, Keith Powell, Ali Reza, Lonny Ross, Brian Stack, and Dean Winters.

In the episode, Liz Lemon (Tina Fey) takes back her sleazy ex-boyfriend Dennis Duffy (Dean Winters), while Jack Donaghy (Alec Baldwin) takes it upon himself to convince her that she is headed for a life of mediocrity. Meanwhile, Tracy Jordan (Tracy Morgan) is enraged when a magazine calls him "normal", and at the same time Jenna Maroney (Jane Krakowski) becomes worried about her age when Jack asks her how old she is.

== Plot ==
Liz and Dennis have gotten back together after Dennis was the only person who remembered her birthday. Disturbed by Liz's acceptance of mediocrity, her boss, Jack, tries to reform her into someone who enjoys the good life. He refers Liz to the fanciest restaurant in the city, Stone. Nevertheless, Liz declines Jack's offer to be her mentor. That night at Stone, Jack and his date walk by Liz and Dennis's table, with Jack very unimpressed by Dennis's manners. The following day, Jack introduces Liz to a former mentee of his, Howard Jorgensen (Brian Stack). At lunch the next day, Liz realizes she is frustrated with her relationship with Dennis, then she storms off to Jack's office to ask for help. Jack motivates Liz to end it with him. Liz comes home to break up with Dennis, only to find him distraught after a loss of his favorite hockey team, the New York Islanders. As a result, Dennis moves in with her.

Meanwhile, Tracy's upset after being identified in a magazine as an actor behaving normally, far from the insane persona he is trying to maintain. To re-establish his street cred, Tracy gets a dragon tattoo on his face, but is later identified as made of Sharpie. At the same time, Josh Girard (Lonny Ross) is told that he is to receive a special gift from Liz Taylor (Rachel Dratch) as a response to an impression he did of the actress on TGS with Tracy Jordan. Liz Taylor sneaks into the 30 Rock studios and, upset over Josh's impersonation, brutally beats him with a fire extinguisher.

At the same time, Jack, responding to audience research, starts cleaning out green clothes from the set. He asks Jenna, one of the stars of TGS, how old she is, and she tells him that she is 29. As a result of this exchange, Jenna gets Botox and collagen injections that go terribly wrong. Later, during a sketch rehearsal—involving impersonations of Condoleezza Rice, Laura Bush, and John Kerry—the various mishaps of Tracy, Jenna, and Josh, Pete and Liz realize that they've produced a terrible episode (worse than an unnamed episode where Tracy Jordan did a tribute to August Wilson, which Liz blames herself for because she should have told Tracy who Wilson was [another version of this scene exists where Liz says that the upcoming episode is worse than when The Girlie Show did a Gilbert and Sullivan parody]) and the only way out is if a major news event pre-empts them (with Pete wondering if Gerald Ford's health is in decline [the alternate version that had the reference to Gilbert and Sullivan also changed Pete's line to wondering if it's still hurricane season]). The power at Studio 8H goes out, cancelling the show. Liz asks Jack if he had anything to do with it, but Jack denies it.

== Production ==
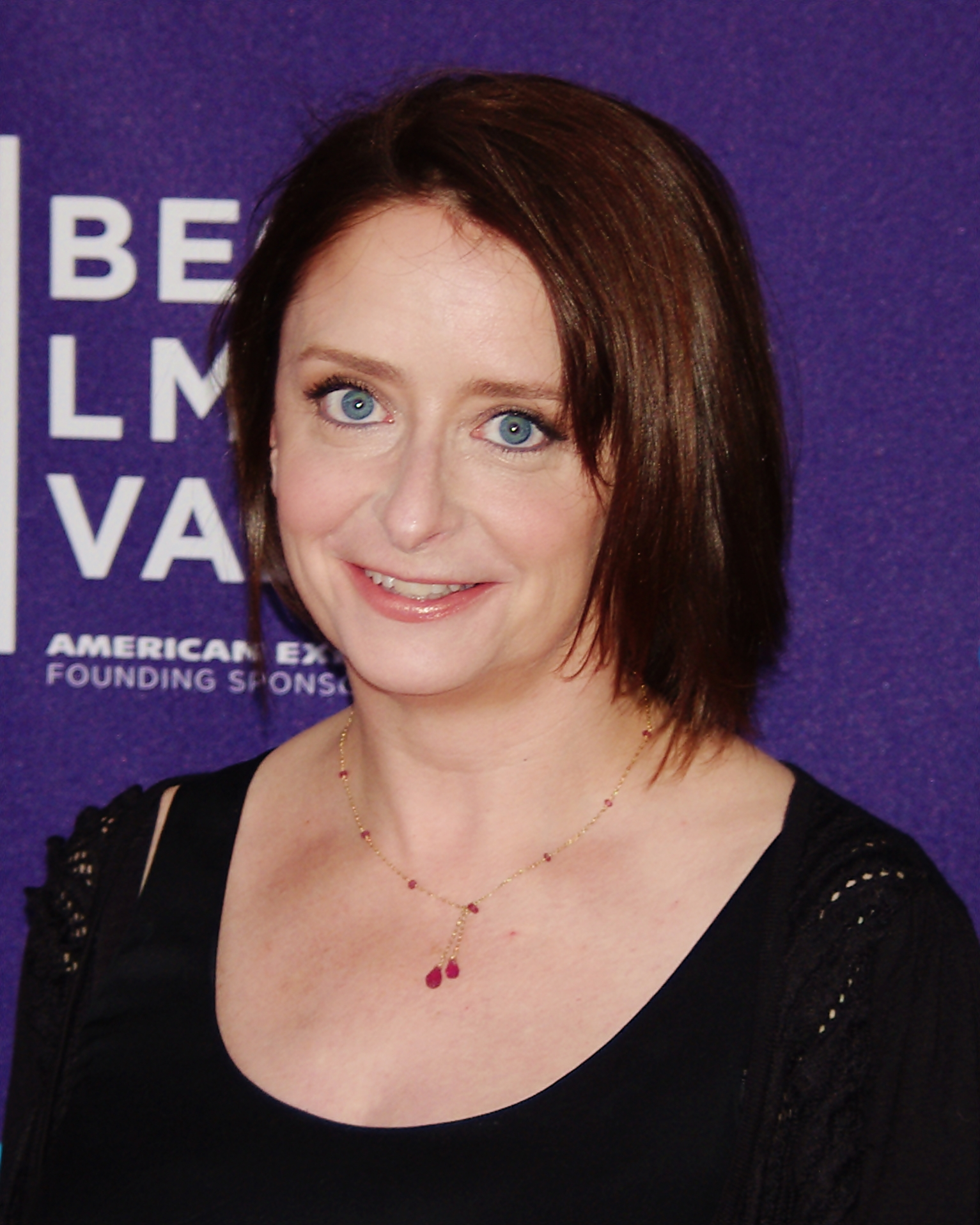
Rachel Dratch made her third appearance in this episode.

"Jack Meets Dennis" was written by co-executive producer Jack Burditt and directed by Juan J. Campanella. This was Burditt's first writing credit, and was Campanella's first directed episode. The episode originally aired on November 30, 2006 on NBC as the sixth episode of the show's first season and overall of the series.

Actor Dean Winters made his 30 Rock debut in this episode as the character Dennis Duffy, a former boyfriend of Liz Lemon. Comedian actor Brian Stack made his first appearance as Howard Jorgensen, a GE executive and associate of Jack Donaghy's in the episode. Stack would guest star in the episodes "Succession" and "Larry King". Rachel Dratch, longtime comedy partner and fellow Saturday Night Live (SNL) alumna of Fey, the show's head writer from 1999 until 2006, was originally cast to portray Jenna Maroney. Dratch played the role in the pilot episode, but in August 2006, actress Jane Krakowski was announced as Dratch's replacement. Executive producer Lorne Michaels announced that while Dratch would not be playing a series regular, she would appear in various episodes in a different role. In the pilot and "The C Word" episodes, Dratch played Greta Johansen, The Girlie Show's cat wrangler. In "The Aftermath", she played Maria the maid, who is found by Liz in a closet on a yacht. In this episode, Dratch played actress Liz Taylor. This was Dratch's third appearance on the show. Various other cast members of SNL have appeared on 30 Rock. These cast members include: Chris Parnell, Fred Armisen, Kristen Wiig, Will Forte, Jason Sudeikis and Molly Shannon. Fey and Tracy Morgan have both been part of the main cast of SNL.

While contemplating how the crew may avoid having to air the episode with the cast in such visibly dire condition, Pete states that the show could be replaced by a live news broadcast of a breaking news event. He then asks "How's Gerald Ford's health?" President Gerald Ford would die on December 26, 2006, less than a month after the episode aired.

== Reception ==
In its original American broadcast, "Jack Meets Dennis" was watched by an average of 5.97 million households, according to the Nielsen ratings system. It received a 2.1 rating among viewers in the 18–49 demographic. "Jack Meets Dennis" finished in 70th place in the weekly ratings for the week of November 27–December 3, 2006. This was an increase from the previous episode, "Jack-Tor", which was watched by 5.2 million American viewers.

Alessandra Stanley of The New York Times said the series worked because it played "with the absurdities of the television business lightly". Stanley felt that 30 Rock was at its best when it revolved around the characters, and not the show itself. IGN contributor Robert Canning said that although Tracy and Jenna "had their moments in two rather weak storylines", the "unfunny and distracting 'Where's Waldo?' casting [regarding Rachel Dratch's different characters that she has played on the show]" disrupted the flow of the episode. He enjoyed the improvement of the show, and said that "though not every story this week was stellar, you didn't go long without a decent laugh." Canning gave "Jack Meets Dennis" a 7.5 out of 10 rating. TV Guide's Matt Mitovich said the episode was "one of the stronger episodes thus far", citing that "[e]veryone got funny stuff to do, the Jack-Liz scenes were crackling and teaming with Liz-induced self-humiliation, and we even got a Rachel Dratch cameo (as that angry, angry Liz Taylor)." Mitovich who had not been a fan of the Jenna character, said that he enjoyed her in this episode. Alan Pergament for The Buffalo News wrote, "The extent that stars go to literally and figuratively maintain their images probably sounded funny on paper [in regards to Tracy and Jenna's storylines], but most of it falls flat and illustrates why 30 Rock has been sinking like a rock". Pergament gave this episode two out of four stars. Amy Amatangelo of the Boston Herald enjoyed Dean Winters' appearances on 30 Rock, noting that he did a "hilarious turn" as Dennis. Matt Roush for TV Guide reported that Alec Baldwin "stole the show" in this episode.
