= Alexandra Krosney =

American actress

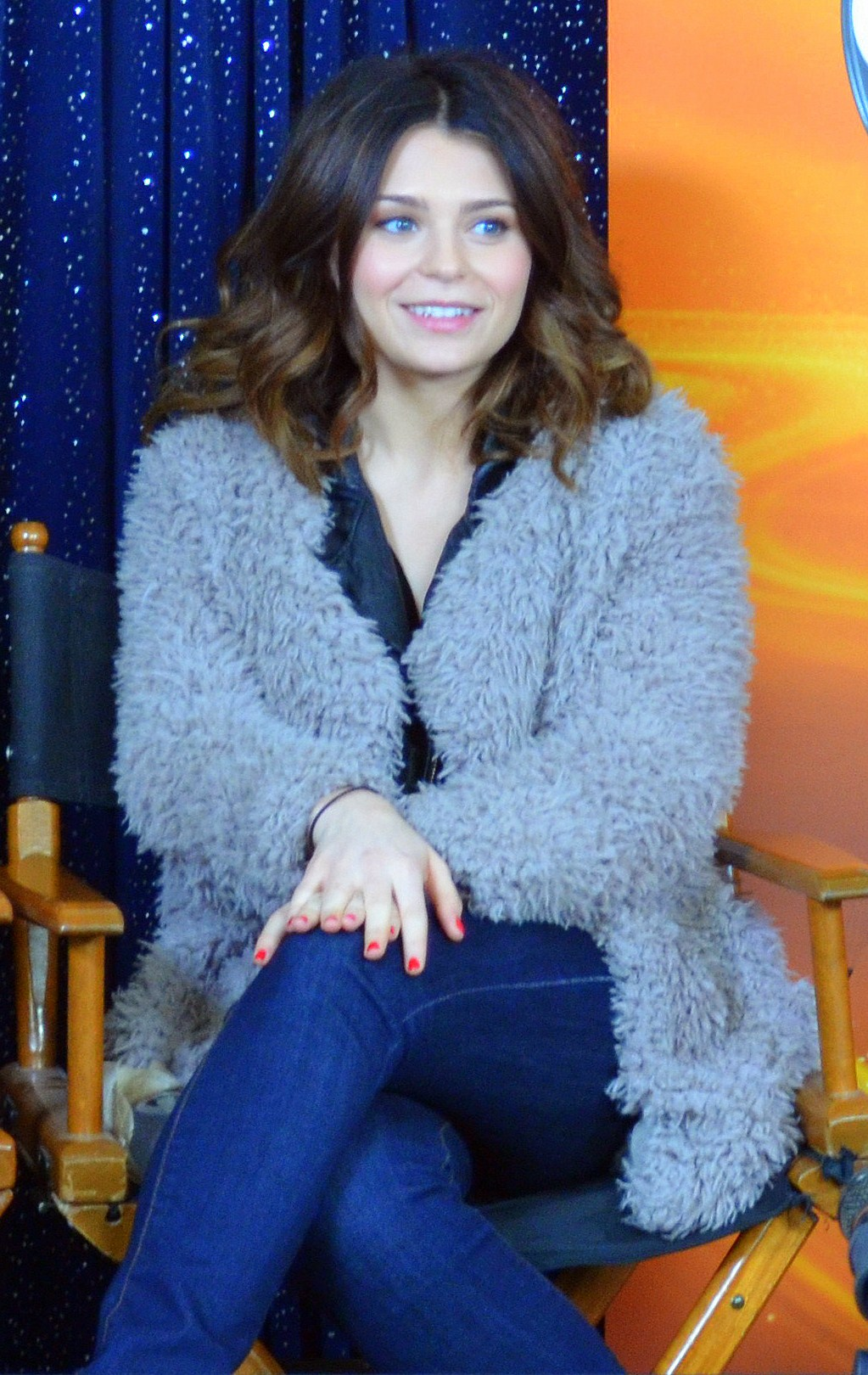
- Krosney in 2012
- Occupation: Actress
- Years active: 2002–present

Alexandra Krosney is an American actress and voice actress. She is best known for her role as Kristin Baxter on the ABC sitcom Last Man Standing during the show's first season.

== Career ==
Some of Krosney's television roles include Bones, Lost, Cory in the House, ER, Nikita, Numb3rs, NCIS and the animated series Transformers: Prime.

Krosney also appeared in television films such as the Disney Channel Original Movie Read It and Weep, Nickelodeon original movies Shredderman Rules and The Last Day of Summer.

From 2011 to 2012, she co-starred in the ABC sitcom Last Man Standing starring Tim Allen. On June 11, 2012, it was announced that Krosney was let go from the sitcom for unspecified creative reasons. The role was recast to Amanda Fuller from season 2 onward.

Krosney originally played the part of Peyton Charles in the pilot of iZombie, an American supernatural procedural drama television series developed for the CW. After the series was ordered in 2014, she was replaced by Aly Michalka.

== Filmography ==
=== Film ===
Year	Title	Role	Notes
2013	The Pinhole Effect	Lillie	Short film
2015	Barely Lethal	Cindy	
2015	Funny Woman	Smart girl from store	
2016	Twenty-Three Pints	Leanne	Short film

=== Television ===
Year	Title	Role	Notes
2002	The Grubbs	Cricket	Cancelled TV pilot
2003	Without a Trace	Young Lianna Sardo	Episode: "Moving On"
2003	Family Affair	Remy	Episodes: "Sissy's Big Fat Moroccan First Date", "Miss Turnstiles", "Crushed"
2004	ER	Trina	Episode: "White Guy, Dark Hair"
2005	Grounded for Life	Angelica	Episode: "Tom Sawyer"
2005	Crossing Jordan	Leann Dawber	Episode: "Murder in the Rue Morgue"
2005	Strong Medicine	Francis Raibly	Episode: "Chief Complaints"
2006	NCIS	Nadia Harcourt	Episode: "Bait"
2006	Bones	Amy Cullen	Episode: "The Graft in the Girl"
2006	Read It and Weep	Harmony	Disney Channel Original Movie
2007	Numbers	Josephine Kirtland	Episode: "Nine Wives"
2007	Without a Trace	Rebecca Howard	Episode: "Connections"
2007	Shredderman Rules	Tina	TV film
2007	The Last Day of Summer	Diana Malloy	TV film
2008	Cory in the House	Blonde Ashley	Episode: "Lip Service"
2008	Criminal Minds	Eileen Bechtold	Episode: "Elephant's Memory"
2009	Lost	Ellie	Episode: "Jughead"
2009	CSI: Crime Scene Investigation	Silver	Episode: "Deep Fried and Minty Fresh"
2009	Surviving Suburbia	Rhonda	Recurring role
2009	Psych	Lucy Ryan	Episode: "The Devil Is in the Details... And the Upstairs Bedroom"
2010	Medium	Keelin McKinney	Episode: "Psych"
2010	Nikita	Sara	Episode: "The Recruit"
2010–2012	Transformers: Prime	Sierra	Voice role; 3 episodes
2011–2012	Last Man Standing	Kristin Baxter	Main role (season 1 only)
2013	Emily Owens, M.D.	Liz Barnes	Episode: "Emily and... The Leap"
2014	Rainbow Brite	Stormy / Canary Yellow	Voice role; 3 episodes
2015	Aquarius	Ms. Jens, fiancée	Episode: "Cease to Resist"
2015	Keith Broke His Leg	Herself	Web series
2015	Self Promotion	Katie Preston	Unsold TV pilot
2021	Archibald's Next Big Thing Is Here	Bethecca	Episode: "A Tiny Problem/Changing Lanes"
