= Stink Fisher =

American actor and restaurant owner (born 1970)

- Born: William Fisher; July 30, 1970 (age 56); Cherry Hill, New Jersey, U.S.
- Occupations: Actor; restaurateur
- Years active: 1994–present

Stink Fisher (born William Fisher; July 30, 1970) is an American actor and restaurant owner who lives in Collingswood, New Jersey.

Born and raised Jewish in Cherry Hill, New Jersey, Fisher played high school football at Cherry Hill High School East. He played college football for the University of Minnesota Golden Gophers and at Rowan University.

Fisher used to own The Pop Shop, a 1950s-themed restaurant with locations in Collingswood and Medford.

He has been in movies such as Invincible, The Longest Yard, and most recently appeared as Ruth's father in The Lovely Bones and as Muscle Guy in Going the Distance. Fisher has appeared on The Sopranos, Late Night with Conan O'Brien, and Throwdown with Bobby Flay. He appeared in the Body of Proof episode "Missing" in 2011, and in the Blue Bloods episode "Growing Boys" in 2013. In 2015, Fisher played Aaron Helzinger in the "Knock Knock" episode as well as the "Damned If You Do" episode of Gotham season 2. In 2016 he joined the cast of "Crossbreed" directed by Brandon Slagle which co-starred Vivica A. Fox as the first African-American female President in a feature film.

As a free agent, he was signed in 1993 with the New York Jets in the NFL before being cut and later played for the Montreal Allouettes of the Canadian Football League.

== Filmography ==
Year	Title	Role	Notes
1994	Molly & Gina	TV Assistant Director	as Bill Fisher
1995	Rent-a-Kid	Mr. Ashley	TV movie
2005	The Longest Yard	Cafeteria Prisoner	
2006	Invincible	Denny Franks	
2009	Neighbor	Daniel Cunningham	
2009	The Nail: The Story of Joey Nardone	Malone	
2009	The Lovely Bones	Mr. Connors	
2010	A Buddy Story	Biker	
2010	Going the Distance	Muscle Guy	
2010	Gulliver's Travels	Construction Worker	
2011	Arthur	Foreman	
2017	A Soldier's Last Thoughts (short film)	Sergeant Magik	
2018	Detective Chinatown 2	Detective Strong Guy	
2018	Crossbreed	Adam "Boss" Ryker"	
TBA	Live to Tell	Lt. Michael "Lou" Koharski	
2020	Joy & Hope	Frank McGregor	
