= Indie Series Awards =

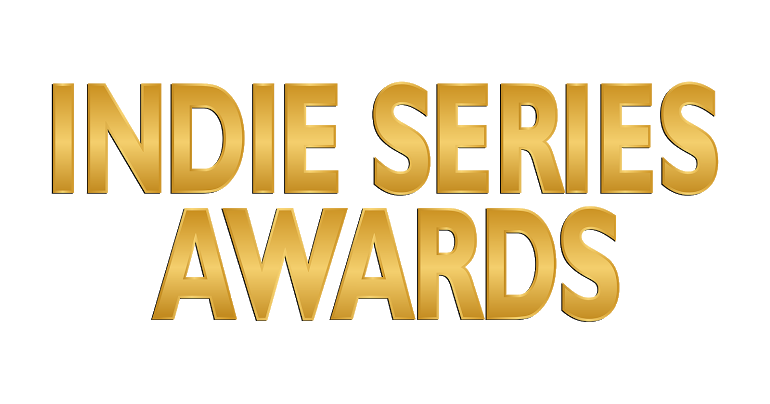
- Awarded for: Excellence in internet television
- Country: United States
- Presented by: We Love Soaps
- First award: February 1, 2010
- Website: www.indieseriesawards.com

The Indie Series Awards (formerly the Indie Soap Awards) is an annual event hosted by We Love Soaps, based in Los Angeles, California, honoring the best in independently produced, scripted entertainment created for the Internet. The ceremony was founded by Roger Newcomb in 2010. In 2013, after the 4th Indie Soap Awards ceremony, the awards were rebranded as the Indie Series Awards.

The awards ceremony was named as one of the 12 "must attend" web series events for creators and fans of online content by Raindance.

== History ==
The award-giving body was established in 2009 by We Love Soaps a Manhattan-based media company boutique that champions serialized entertainment in all forms. In 2011, it became a live event for the first time, hosted by Martha Byrne at the Alvin Ailey American Dance Theater in New York City. The awards ceremony was eventually moved from New York City to Los Angeles in 2014.

Pretty earned a record 13 nominations in December 2011, and Winterthorne tied that record in February 2016. In January 2017, it was announced that the number of nominees for the Best Web Series Drama and Comedy awards would be increased from six to eight in each category. In February 2017, The Bay led with 21 nominations, followed by The Amazing Gayl Pile with 16, both of which broke the previous record of 13 nominations.

== Awards ceremonies ==
| Ceremony | Date | Best Web Series winner | Host(s) | Venue | Ref. |
|---|---|---|---|---|---|
| 1st Indie Soap Awards | February 1, 2010 | Diary of a Single Mom | Roger Newcomb and Damon L. Jacobs | Shetler Studios | |
| 2nd Indie Soap Awards | February 21, 2011 | Diary of a Single Mom | Martha Byrne | Alvin Ailey Studios | |
| 3rd Indie Soap Awards | February 21, 2012 | Pretty (Comedy); Ragged Isle (Drama) | Colleen Zenk | New World Stages | |
| 4th Indie Soap Awards | February 19, 2013 | The Bloody Mary Show (Comedy); Out with Dad (Drama) | Colleen Zenk, Kevin Spirtas, Martha Byrne, Hillary B. Smith | New World Stages | |
| 5th Indie Series Awards | April 2, 2014 | Professional Friend (Comedy); Hustling (Drama) | Carolyn Hennesy | El Portal Theatre | |
| 6th Indie Series Awards | April 1, 2015 | Acting Dead (Comedy); L.A. Macabre (Drama) | Eric Martsolf | El Portal Theatre | |
| 7th Indie Series Awards | April 6, 2016 | Keith Broke His Leg (Comedy); Arthur (Drama) | Eric Martsolf and Jen Lilley | El Portal Theatre | |
| 8th Indie Series Awards | April 5, 2017 | Fame Dogs (Comedy); The Bay (Drama) | Kit Williamson and John Halbach | The Colony Theatre | |
| 9th Indie Series Awards | April 4, 2018 | How to Buy a Baby (Comedy); Giants (Drama) | Patrika Darbo | The Colony Theatre | |
| 10th Indie Series Awards | April 3, 2019 | Indoor Boys (Comedy); Giants (Drama) | Patrika Darbo, Eric Martsolf, Kevin Spirtas | The Colony Theatre | |
| 11th Indie Series Awards | June 18, 2020 | Indoor Boys (Comedy)After Forever (Drama) | Sean Kanan | Virtual event | |
| 12th Indie Series Awards | April 7, 2022 | Cady Did (Comedy)For the Record (Drama) | Patrika Darbo and Anna Maria Horsford | The Colony Theatre | |
| 13th Indie Series Awards | April 12, 2023 | Millennials (Comedy) Studio City (Drama) | Patrika Darbo | The Colony Theatre | |
| 14th Indie Series Awards | May 15, 2025 | Keith Vs. (Comedy) Kombucha Cure (Drama) | Patrika Darbo | The Colony Theatre | |

== Categories ==
=== Current categories ===
- Best Web Series — Drama
- Best Web Series — Comedy
- Best Directing — Drama
- Best Directing — Comedy
- Best Writing — Drama
- Best Writing — Comedy
- Best Lead Actress — Drama
- Best Lead Actress — Comedy
- Best Lead Actor — Drama
- Best Lead Actor — Comedy
- Best Supporting Actress — Drama
- Best Supporting Actress — Comedy
- Best Supporting Actor — Drama
- Best Supporting Actor — Comedy
- Best Guest Actress — Drama
- Best Guest Actress — Comedy
- Best Guest Actor — Drama
- Best Guest Actor — Comedy
- Best Ensemble — Drama
- Best Ensemble — Comedy
- Best Original Song
- Best Soundtrack
- Best Original Score
- Best Sound Design
- Best Special/Visual Effects
- Best Cinematography
- Best Editing
- Best Makeup
- Best Production Design
- Best Costume Design

=== Discontinued categories ===
- Best Breakthrough/Breakout Performance
- Best Crossover Performance
- Best Indie Web Series
- Best Opening Sequence
- Best Performance in a Comedic Role
- Best Sound Design
- Best Storyline
- Best Use of Music

=== Special categories ===
- Fan's Choice Award
- Special Editor's Awards
