= Keith Powell =

American actor (born 1979)

- Born: August 12, 1979 (age 47); Philadelphia, Pennsylvania, U.S.
- Education: New York University (BFA)
- Years active: 2002–present
- Spouse: Jill Knox (m. 2013)
- Children: 2

Keith Powell (born August 12, 1979) is an American television actor, writer, director, and web series creator, known for his role as James "Toofer" Spurlock on 30 Rock, and for creating and starring in the web series Keith Broke His Leg, for which he won several Indie Series Awards in 2016.

== Early life and education ==
Born in Philadelphia, Pennsylvania, Powell later moved to California before graduating from St. Mark's High School in Wilmington, Delaware. Powell then earned a Bachelor of Fine Arts from New York University's Tisch School of the Arts in 2001.

== Career ==
Powell was the Producing Artistic Director of Contemporary Stage Company, a summer theater in Wilmington, Delaware. His producing credits include New York productions of The Mouse That Roared, Enter Pissarro, Indra & Agni Collide and a workshop of Kidding Jane with Ellen McLaughlin and William Charles Mitchell. Powell was the resident director for Equalogy, a professional touring company promoting social change, for which he directed two plays by August Schulenberg, Four Hearts Changing and One Night.

His other directing credits include Dutchman, Quality of Silence, The Visit and Enter Pissarro. As an actor, Powell has appeared in numerous national network commercials. His theatre credits include Romeo & Juliet (The Shakespeare Theatre, Washington, D.C.), Kidding Jane (Portland Stage Company), Macbeth (Pittsburgh Public Theater), As Bees in Honey Drown (Hangar Theater, Ithaca, New York), and The French (HB Playwrights Foundation, NYC) among others.

In the spring of 2007, while working as a recurring character on 30 Rock, he shot an ABC pilot called Judy's Got A Gun. It was not picked up for the Fall 2007 season, and Powell returned to 30 Rock, where he was promoted to a series regular. In October 2008, Powell launched and starred in a self-funded web series called Keith Powell Directs a Play (co-written and directed by Patrick Flynn), chronicling Powell's foray into directing Uncle Vanya at a fictional repertory theatre group. In 2009, Powell was a guest commentator on VH1's 100 Greatest One Hit Wonders of the 80s, and also played a Tuskegee Airman in Night at the Museum: Battle of the Smithsonian.

In 2014, Powell began a recurring role on the television series About a Boy as Richard, Will's workaholic friend, accountant, and business manager.

Powell recurred on the final season of The Newsroom. He appeared in the feature film My Name Is David. In 2015, he created, wrote, directed, and starred in the web series Keith Broke His Leg. The series went on to win several Indie Series Awards, including Best Comedy Series and Best Actor in a Comedy.

Powell began his television directing career in March 2018 with the season three episode "Amnesty" of the NBC television series Superstore. He has since directed episodes of Dickinson, Single Drunk Female, Interview with the Vampire, and So Help Me Todd.

== Personal life ==
In October 2013, Powell married visual artist Jill Knox. They had a son who was stillborn. In 2019, Powell and Knox announced the birth of their daughter. In 2021, they welcomed a boy. Powell and Knox live in Los Angeles.

== Filmography ==
=== Film ===
==== Actor ====
Year	Title	Role	Notes
2009	Night at the Museum: Battle of the Smithsonian	Tuskegee Airman #1	
2010	Armless	Hotel Receptionist	
2013	Syrup	Cameron	
2015	Train Baby	David	
2016	Odd Squad: The Movie	Weird Keith	
2019	The Way We Weren't	Dan	
2019	Lying and Stealing	Mike Williams	
2020	To the Beat! Back 2 School	Mr. Richards	
2021	Marvelous and the Black Hole	Leo	
2021	The Beta Test	Terrance	
2022	Spoonful of Sugar	Dr. Welsh	

==== Director ====
Year	Title	Notes
2012	Nate & Abe	Short
2014	People We Meet	Short
2019	Sophie's Quinceañera	Short
2019	Convenience	Short
2020	Dosed	Short
2021	In White Places	Short
2026	Buttercup Pudding Pie	Short

=== Television ===
==== Actor ====
Year	Title	Role	Notes
2003	Law & Order: Criminal Intent	Gregg Monroe	Episode: "Blink"
2005	Law & Order	Mike	Episode: "Ain't No Love"
2006–2013	30 Rock	James "Toofer" Spurlock	130 episodes
2007	Judy's Got a Gun	Brad Wilkes	Television film
2008–2009	Keith Powell Directs a Play	Keith Powell	8 episodes
2009	Reno 911!	Innocent Black Man	Episode: "Wiegel's Couple's Therapy"
2012	NCIS: Los Angeles	Robert Pierce	Episode: "Out of the Past"
2014	The Newsroom	Wyatt Geary	2 episodes
2014–2015	About a Boy	Richard	6 episodes
2016	Deadbeat	Cashier / Lonathan	Episode: "Medieval Dead"
2018	Cape Kids	Acer	Episode: "Ignite Good to Help the Environment"
2019	Better Things	Keith Powell	Episode: "The Unknown"
2019	The Room Actors: Where Are They Now?	Norman	Episode: "Stay at home Dan"
2020	Grace and Frankie	Jordan	Episode: "The Tank"
2020	Connecting	Garrett	8 episodes
2020	30 Rock: A One-Time Special	James "Toofer" Spurlock	Television special
2020, 2021	This Is Us	Dr. Vance	2 episodes
2022	Little Demon	Various voices	2 episodes
2023–present	Shrinking	Mark	4 episodes
2026	R.J. Decker	Bob Vernon	Episode: "In Vanity Veritas"

==== Director ====
Year	Title	Notes
2008–2009	Keith Powell Directs a Play	2 episodes
2015	Keith Broke His Leg	10 episodes
2018	Superstore	Episode: "Amnesty"
2021	A Holiday in Harlem	TV movie
2021	Dickinson	Episode: "Sang from the Heart, Sire"
2022	Single Drunk Female	Episode: "New York"
2022	Interview with the Vampire	2 episodes
2022	So Help Me Todd	Episode: "Let the Wright One In"
2022	Home Economics	Episode: "Wheel of Vegan Brie, $24"
2022	Big Sky	Episode: "Where There's Smoke There's Fire"
2023	Young Rock	Episode: "Going Heavy"
2023	Doogie Kameāloha, M.D.	Episode: "I'm Just a Mom"
2023–present	Keith vs	8 episodes
2024	Not Dead Yet	Episode: "Not in the Game Yet"
2024–present	Will Trent	3 episodes
2025	Clean Slate	Episode: "Chrome Jesus"

== Awards and nominations ==
Year	Award	Category	Work	Result	Ref.
2008	Screen Actors Guild Awards	Outstanding Performance by an Ensemble in a Comedy Series	30 Rock	Nominated	
2009	Screen Actors Guild Awards	Outstanding Performance by an Ensemble in a Comedy Series	30 Rock	Won	
2010	Screen Actors Guild Awards	Outstanding Performance by an Ensemble in a Comedy Series	30 Rock	Nominated	
2011	Screen Actors Guild Awards	Outstanding Performance by an Ensemble in a Comedy Series	30 Rock	Nominated	
2012	Screen Actors Guild Awards	Outstanding Performance by an Ensemble in a Comedy Series	30 Rock	Nominated	
2013	Screen Actors Guild Awards	Outstanding Performance by an Ensemble in a Comedy Series	30 Rock	Nominated	
2014	Screen Actors Guild Awards	Outstanding Performance by an Ensemble in a Comedy Series	30 Rock	Nominated	
