= Ben Baur =

American actor

- Occupation: Actor
- Years active: 2007–present
- Notable credits: Hunting Season; #Adulting

Ben Baur is an American actor known for starring in the LGBT-themed web series Hunting Season. Out named him to its Out100 list in 2015.

== Early life ==
Baur attended West Albany High School in Albany, Oregon, graduating in 2004. Baur graduated from the American Musical and Dramatic Academy.

== Career ==
Baur had guest roles on the television series Nip/Tuck and Happily Divorced before starring as Alex in the LGBT-themed web series Hunting Season. After appearing in the series The Following and Difficult People, he played Kip Stark in several episodes of the web series These People from 2015 to 2016. Baur and longtime friend Thandi Tolmay co-created, co-produced, and co-starred in the web series #Adulting in 2016. He has also written episodes of These People and #Adulting. In January 2017, Baur posted on Instagram that he had worked on the ABC soap opera General Hospital in an undisclosed role. He played mail clerk Noah on the show on February 27, 2017. Baur also wrote and starred in the short film Something New, which premiered at Outfest Los Angeles in 2017.

== Filmography ==
Year	Project	Role	Notes	Ref.
2007	Nip/Tuck	Freddy Prune's Assistant	Television series (Season 5 – Episode: "Carly Summers")	
2011	Happily Divorced	Anthony	TV series (Season 1 – Episode: "A Date with Destiny")	
2012–2015	Hunting Season	Alex	Web series (Main cast)	
2014	Mythos	Young Luke	Web series (Episode: "Sea and Sky")	
2014	The Following	Prisoner	TV series (Season 2 – Episode: "The Messenger")	
2014–2015	What Would You Do?	Gay Man/Waiter	TV series (2 episodes)	
2015	Front Cover	Eddie	Film	
2015	Difficult People	Gay Rights Activist	Web series (Season 1 – Episode: "Library Water")	
2015	Dropping the Soap	Chandler	Web series (Episode: "Julian's Choice")	
2015–2016	These People	Kip Stark	Web series (6 episodes)	
2016	#Adulting	Max	Web series (Main cast)	
2017	Something Like Summer	Jace Holden	Film	
2017	General Hospital	Noah the Mail Clerk	TV series (1 episode)	
2017	Famous in Love	Reporter	Episode: "Leaving Los Angeles"	
2017	EastSiders	Jason	Web series (Episode: "Cats")	
2017	The Journey of Being Likable	Drew	Web series (5 episodes)	
2017	Something New	Jonah	Short film	
2022	Unconformity	Gary	Film	
2024	There's a Zombie Outside	Himself	Film	

== Reception ==
In 2015, Out named Baur to its Out100 list, after previously placing him on the magazine's "Most Eligible Bachelors" list two years in a row.

=== Awards and nominations ===
Baur was nominated for an Indie Series Award for Best Actor (Comedy) in 2012 and 2016 for his work in Hunting Season, and in 2017 for #Adulting. The entire Hunting Season cast won the Indie for Best Ensemble (Comedy) in 2016.

Year	Award	Category	Project	Result	Ref.
2012	4th Indie Soap Awards	Best Actor — Comedy	Hunting Season	Nominated	
2012	4th Indie Soap Awards	Best Ensemble — Comedy	Hunting Season	Nominated	
2016	7th Indie Series Awards	Best Lead Actor — Comedy	Hunting Season	Nominated	
2016	7th Indie Series Awards	Best Ensemble — Comedy	Hunting Season	Won	
2017	8th Indie Series Awards	Best Web Series — Comedy	#Adulting (creator/writer/producer)	Nominated	
2017	8th Indie Series Awards	Best Lead Actor — Comedy	#Adulting	Nominated	

== Personal life ==
Baur is gay. In 2012, he wrote a column for The Huffington Post about his experiences coming out and being an "out gay actor". He and his partner Craig Gates were engaged in May 2018.
