= Worth (The Walking Dead) =

- The Walking Dead episode
- Episode no.: Season 8 Episode 15
- Directed by: Michael Slovis
- Written by: David Leslie Johnson-McGoldrick; Corey Reed
- Cinematography by: Stephen Campbell
- Editing by: Dan Liu
- Original air date: April 8, 2018
- Running time: 52 minutes

Guest appearances
- Avi Nash as Siddiq; Cooper Andrews as Jerry; Sydney Park as Cyndie; Elizabeth Ludlow as Arat; Jon Eyez as Potter; Briana Venskus as Beatrice; Nicole Barré as Kathy; Mimi Kirkland as Rachel; James Chen as Kal; Peter Zimmerman as Eduardo; Lindsley Register as Laura; Mike Seal as Gary; Traci Dinwiddie as Regina; Chloe Aktas as Tanya; Elyse Nicole DuFour as Frankie; Aaron Farb as Norris; Matt Mangum as D.J.; Brooke Jaye Taylor as Brooke; Gina Stewart as Gina; José Michael Vasquez as José; Scott Deckert as John

Episode chronology
← Previous "Still Gotta Mean Something"	Next → "Wrath"
- The Walking Dead season 8

"Worth" is the fifteenth and penultimate episode of the eighth season of the post-apocalyptic horror television series The Walking Dead, which aired on AMC on April 8, 2018. It was written by David Leslie Johnson-McGoldrick and Corey Reed, and directed by Michael Slovis.

This episode marks the final appearance of Simon (Steven Ogg) apart from a brief cameo in The Walking Dead: Dead City.

== Plot ==
At the Hilltop Colony, Rick re-reads his letter from his deceased son, Carl, urging Rick to end the war with Negan, start over and help to rebuild a peaceful society.

Inside the Sanctuary, Gregory tries to make amends with Simon, who has taken over the Saviors after claiming that Negan is dead. Gregory insists he can help resecure the other communities, but Simon puts him to work instead.

In the woods, outside the Oceanside community, Cyndie and the other residents shun Aaron's attempts to protect their community, despite him starving and dehydrating himself. After barely surviving a walker attack, Cyndie and the others find an exhausted Aaron begging them to join the fight against the Saviors as they would otherwise continue to be fearful of the outside world.

Meanwhile, Eugene oversees the workers making ammunition for the Saviors and is forced to dismiss an ill Gabriel, who has purposely tampered with the bullets to make them ineffectual. As Eugene heads out with guards, the guards are quickly dispatched by Daryl and Rosita. They take Eugene captive, planning to keep him locked up to be able to use his intellect. While Daryl dispatches approaching walkers, Eugene is able to induce himself to vomit over Rosita; Eugene escapes.

Outside the Sanctuary, Dwight, still hiding his alliance with the Militia, is surprised to see Negan, who had returned the night before. Dwight begins to explain what happened, but Negan is unconcerned and only reminds him about his loyalty to the Saviors. Later, Negan gathers his lieutenants for a meeting where Simon apologizes for the Hilltop disaster; Negan then reminds Simon that he also orchestrated the killing of all the men and boys from Oceanside, something that made Negan keep an eye on Simon from then on. Simon is forced to get on his knees, but then Negan declares Simon forgiven and instructs his lieutenants to set up sniper nests all around the Hilltop to contain the residents in order to win a war of attrition. Shortly after the meeting, Negan again commends Dwight for staying true to the goal of the Saviors. In his apartment, Dwight marks up a map for Rick and writes a message describing Negan's attack plan. Simon, anxious from the meeting, stops by and urges Dwight to help him overthrow Negan; Dwight agrees to meet with Simon to plan the coup sometime later.

In the courtyard, Dwight meets with Simon, who also brings Gregory and several other Saviors who would like to see Negan eliminated. Simon explains his plan for Negan's downfall and offers Dwight the opportunity to kill Negan first hand, but Dwight unexpectedly whistles. Negan—having been tipped off by Dwight—whistles in response and emerges from his hiding place. All of the conspirators including Gary along with the exception of Simon and Gregory are suddenly shot and executed by a group of hidden, loyal Saviors. Negan then angrily reprimands Simon for the massacre of the Scavengers and going against his orders. Despite this and his backstabbing, Negan offers Simon a chance of leadership of the Saviors by fighting to the death. In the Sanctuary, with all the Saviors and workers gathered, Negan and Simon engage in a furious and brutal fist fight. Simon initially gets the upper hand before Negan eventually overpowers him, beating Simon to the floor. Dwight uses the opportunity to pull Gregory aside, hand him the map to deliver to Rick, and direct him to a vehicle he previously prepared for a quick escape; Gregory runs off. Negan, hovering over Simon, strangles his right-hand man to death, all the while furiously berating Simon for ruining what chance they had left of making peace with the communities and asserting that he'll now have to kill them all. He then gives one final squeeze that crushes Simon's windpipe, killing him. Afterwards, Gregory returns to Hilltop with the plans, but is thrown back in prison by Maggie, who then gives Dwight's map to Rick.

Walking Dwight back to his room, Negan offers Dwight to be his new right-hand man; Dwight accepts. However, inside Dwight's room, Negan reveals who he picked up on his way back to the Sanctuary—Laura, a high-ranking Savior that witnessed Dwight's treachery during the night of the attack on Alexandria. Having learned of Dwight's betrayal, Negan deduces that Dwight was responsible for many of the Militia's attacks on the Savior outposts and explains that the map Dwight secretly conveyed to Rick, Maggie, & Ezekiel will lead the Militia right into the Saviors' line of fire, saying the plan was fake. He then tells Dwight that he won't kill him, but rather has plans for him. Later, Eugene returns to the ammunition factory, more resolved to make sure to meet Negan's requirements for bullets.

After having a freshly turned Simon chained to the Sanctuary fence, Negan is contacted by Michonne over walkie-talkie; she reads Carl's letter to him, again reiterating his same request to end the war peacefully and start over. However, Negan refuses and states that Rick pushed him too far and that forgiveness is out of the question, vowing to kill her, Rick and the entire Militia. He finishes by saying "no more talk" before angrily crushing the walkie-talkie with his foot.

== Production ==
Chandler Riggs is re-added to the opening credits in this episode due to his voice-only role. His character, Carl Grimes, had been killed off in the ninth episode of the season, "Honor", which was his last on-screen appearance.

Steven Ogg, who portrayed Simon, had been told by showrunner Scott M. Gimple that Simon was going to be killed off at the live season eight premiere event on October 22, 2017. Ogg asked Gimple to have Simon go down in a "big cannonball". Both he and Jeffrey Dean Morgan, Negan's portrayer, filmed their big fight scene themselves, rather than using stunt performers. This is despite neither of them having any formal fight training.

== Reception ==
=== Critical reception ===
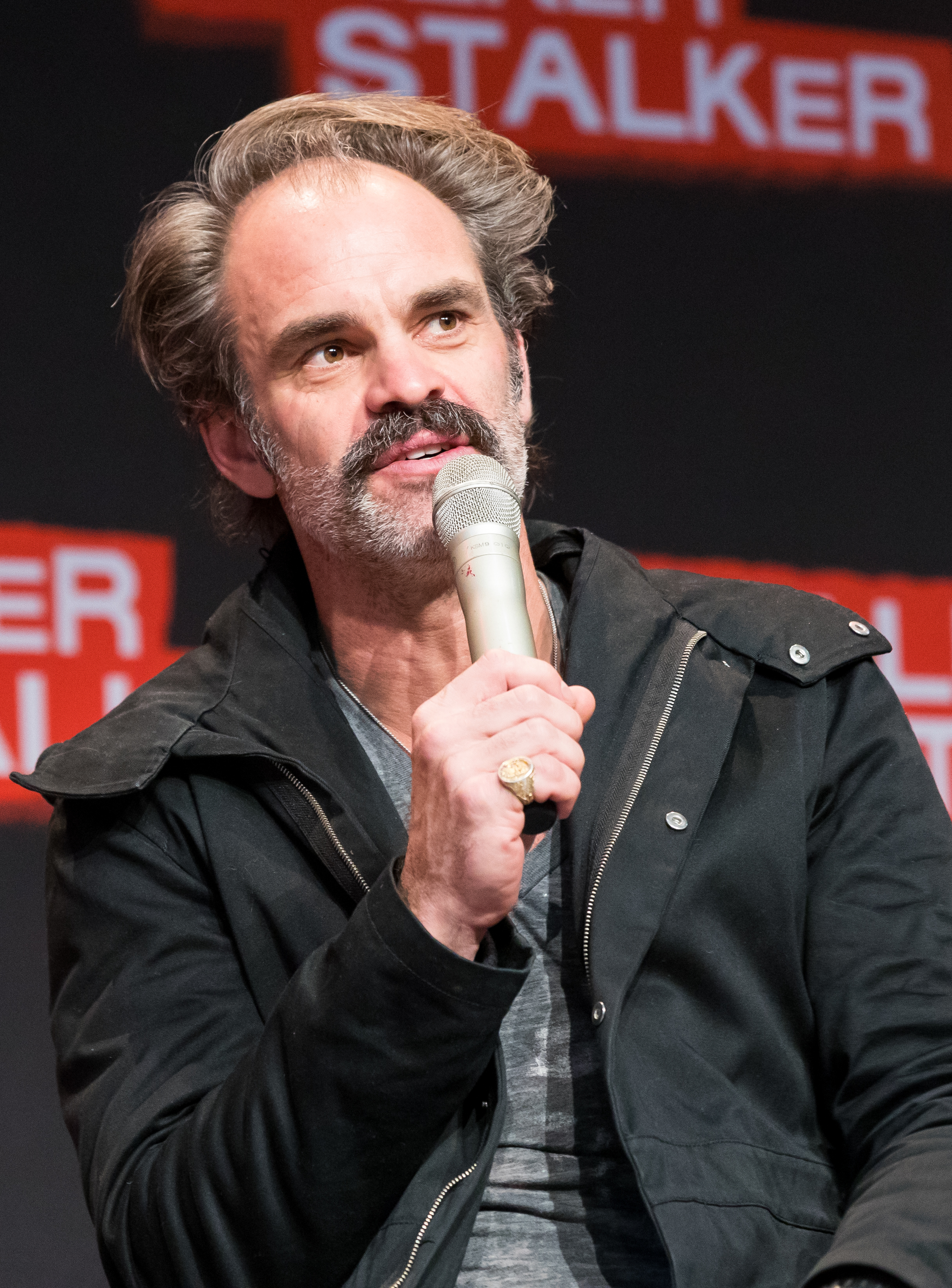
Steven Ogg made his final regular appearance in this episode after his character is killed by Negan. Ogg's performance was highly acclaimed by critics.

"Worth" received positive reviews from critics. On Rotten Tomatoes, it holds an 89% with an average rating of 6.66 out of 10, based on 27 reviews. The site's consensus reads: "Worth" briskly cleans house to varying degrees of satisfaction, setting the stage for what could be one of the series' most explosive finales—assuming the show finally follows through on its promise of All Out War.

Most critics commented positively on Steven Ogg's performance. Joe Otterson of Variety wrote: "Once again, Steven Ogg proves himself to be one of the best villains in the game in this week's episode of "The Walking Dead". Ogg's Simon makes his move to take over the Sanctuary, but his timing proves to be a little off."

Noel Murray of Rolling Stone complemented the episode by writing: "All signs right now point to next week's finale being especially violent and deadly...Which is good. Because frankly, it's starting to seem like The Walking Dead's writers are as eager for this storyline to be over as so many of the rest of us have been." Nick Romano of Entertainment Weekly gave the episode an original score of "B+" and wrote: "Last week left us with a few lingering questions, and now we have some answers." Luke Holland of The Guardian wrote: "It was a dialogue-heavy episode, but because there was so much going on it felt brisk, tense and urgent, and left behind the promise of a finale with all the extraneous gristle removed." Matt Fowler of IGN gave the episode a score of 7.3 out of 10 and wrote: ""Worth," Season 8's penultimate episode, wrapped up the current Savior game o' thrones storyline involving Simon's attempt to take over as the lead Negan of the Negans, but it seemed like a lot (and a lot of time spent with some uninteresting Saviors) just to get Negan to a place where he could line up with Rick's bloodlust." Alex McLevy of The A.V. Club gave the episode a "B" score, writing: "It's easy to admire the show's willingness to take out one of the Saviors' most compelling characters in one go...but it's also another example of the show no longer willing to put anyone from the main credits in peril unless it's a season (or mid-season) finale."

=== Ratings ===
The episode received a total viewership of 6.67 million with a 2.8 rating in adults aged 18–49, which was an increase from the previous week's season low of 6.30 million.
