= Pat Skipper =

American actor

- Born: William Patterson Skipper; September 23, 1958 (age 67); Lakeland, Florida, U.S.
- Occupation: Actor
- Spouse: Jennifer Hammond
- Children: 2

William Patterson "Pat" Skipper (born September 23, 1958) is an American actor. Skipper is probably best known for his television work on such shows as The X-Files and Boston Legal. On film, he played Carducci in the (1996) action/horror film Hellraiser IV: Bloodline, Mason Strode from Halloween, Seabiscuit's Vet from Seabiscuit (2003), Bob from Fits and Starts, and Agent Ellroy from Chain of Command. He also wrote a book called "The Working Actor" in 2015.

Skipper was born in Lakeland, Florida. He was educated at Florida State University and Yale University. He is married to composer/arranger Jennifer Hammond. Their twins, Jack and Amelia, were born in 2002.

== Filmography ==
- Wall Street (1987) – Postal Inspector
- Demonstone (1989) – Tony McKee
- Lethal Weapon 2 (1989) – Hitman
- Predator 2 (1990) – Federal Team #2
- Memoirs of an Invisible Man (1992) – Morrissey
- Demolition Man (1993) - Helicopter Pilot
- The Adventures of Brisco County, Jr. (1994) – Donovan Joe
- Hellraiser IV: Bloodline (1996) – Carducci
- Independence Day (1996) – Redneck
- The Pest (1997) – Glen Livitt
- The X Files (1997) – Bill Scully Jr.
- JAG (1998) – General Albanese
- That '70s Show (1999) – Marty Forman
- Chain of Command (2000) – Agent Ellroy
- In the Light of the Moon (2000) – Sheriff Jim Stillwell
- Walker, Texas Ranger (1999) – Detective Baker
- Fits and Starts (2002) – Bob
- Seabiscuit (2003) – Seabiscuit's Vet
- See Arnold Run (2005) – Mike Murphy
- Bones (2006) – Vince McVicar
- Criminal Minds (2007) – Harris Townsend
- Halloween (2007) – Mason Strode
- American Summer (2009) – Frank
- The Mentalist (2014) - Supervising Agent Daniels
- Babylon (2022) – William Randolph Hearst
- Oppenheimer (2023) – Secretary of State James F. Byrnes
- Den of Thieves 2: Pantera (2025) – Ed Flanagan

== Video games ==
- Emergency Room: Code Blue (2000) – Homer Farrow
- Emergency Room 2 (1999)
