= Still Gotta Mean Something =

- The Walking Dead episode
- Episode no.: Season 8 Episode 14
- Directed by: Michael E. Satrazemis
- Written by: Eddie Guzelian
- Cinematography by: Paul Varrieur
- Editing by: Evan Schrodek
- Original air date: April 1, 2018
- Running time: 50 minutes

Guest appearances
- Callan McAuliffe as Alden; Joshua Mikel as Jared; Cooper Andrews as Jerry; Lane Miller as Reilly; Kerry Cahill as Dianne; Macsen Lintz as Henry; Nadine Marissa as Nabila; Mike Seal as Gary; James Chen as Kal; Matt Mangum as D.J.; Mark Ashworth as Evan; Traci Dinwiddie as Regina

Episode chronology
← Previous "Do Not Send Us Astray"	Next → "Worth"
- The Walking Dead (season 8)

"Still Gotta Mean Something" is the fourteenth episode of the eighth season and 113th episode overall of the post-apocalyptic horror television series The Walking Dead, which aired on AMC on April 1, 2018. It was written by Eddie Guzelian and directed by Michael E. Satrazemis.

== Plot ==
In flashback, Jadis (Pollyanna McIntosh) plays dead to save herself from the massacre of the Scavengers by Simon and the Saviors. In the present, she takes time to compose herself before collecting a captive Negan (Jeffrey Dean Morgan) and carrying his modified baseball bat, "Lucille", and a suitcase. Negan tries to apologize for what happened to her people, recognizing that Simon had gone against his orders in wiping out the Scavengers, but Jadis is steadfast and threatens to kill him. While she is out of sight, he is able to access her suitcase, containing a gun and pictures from her past, convincing her to talk lest he destroy them with a flare. He reveals that he named his bat after his late wife, Lucille, and, like Jadis' pictures, his bat is the last thing he has to remember his previous life. Jadis' wristwatch beeps, and she suddenly rushes Negan to get the flare, but it is knocked out of their hands into a puddle, and extinguishes. She races off to get another flare as a helicopter hovers briefly overhead before disappearing, too late to see Jadis' second flare. Jadis breaks down into tears, and she lets Negan go; he offers her to come with him and follow a new path, but she refuses. Negan promises Jadis to get justice for her murdered people.

Meanwhile, the Hilltop community regroups after the Saviors' attack. Tara (Alanna Masterson) unsuccessfully tries to sway Daryl (Norman Reedus) that Dwight is still loyal to them after the attack. Michonne (Danai Gurira) tries to convince Rick (Andrew Lincoln) to read his son Carl's last message to him, but he cannot come to do it. Instead, he decides to locate the escaped Savior prisoners, and Alden (Callan McAuliffe) suggest that he check a nearby bar.

Morgan (Lennie James) feels guilt for Henry's (Macsen Lintz) disappearance, as Henry had been seeking vengeance on Jared (Joshua Mikel), the Savior that killed his brother and Morgan's pupil Benjamin. He goes out to look for him, accompanied by Carol (Melissa McBride). They find a walker with Henry's weapon through it, and Morgan believes Henry must be dead and instead heads further down the road, while Carol goes in the direction the walker came from to find Henry. Morgan meets up with Rick, and while they avoid a walker horde heading towards the bar, they are captured by the escaped Saviors, led by Jared. When Rick and Morgan come to in the bar, they find the Saviors arguing loudly among themselves. Rick and Morgan warn them of the nearby horde, but it comes too late as walkers flood the bar. Rick and Morgan manage to escape their bonds. Rick helps to eliminate walkers, but then turns on the remaining Saviors. Morgan chases down Jared and purposely traps him in a room with walkers, leaving Jared to die. As they collect themselves, Rick asks Morgan what changed to make him vengeful since their first meeting; Morgan replies that he had his son back then. Meanwhile, Carol is able to find Henry fending off walkers. She helps rescue him and takes him back to the Hilltop for a happy reunion. Rick and Morgan return, and Morgan informs Henry he killed Jared. Henry says he's sorry, but Morgan tells him to never say one's sorry, and walks off alone. Rick tearfully reads his letter from Carl.

Elsewhere, Daryl and Rosita (Christian Serratos) discover the Saviors' ammunition factory, where Eugene (Josh McDermitt) is helping to keep their ammo supply going. Daryl and Rosita plot to kill the men running the factory to end the supply. Concurrently, Negan is on route back to the Sanctuary when he finds a familiar face and offers them a ride. Back at Sanctuary, the gate guards are surprised to see Negan alive, believing he had been killed based on what Simon had told them. They let Negan and his passenger in, but Negan tells them not to tell anyone else about his return.

== Production ==
The scene in which Carol saves Henry from walkers while he is trapped among tree roots mirrors the scene from the season two premiere episode, "What Lies Ahead", in which Rick ushers Carol's daughter, Sophia, into a similar set of tree roots to have her hide from walkers; this was the last time Sophia was seen alive in the series, as she was found turned to a walker in the mid-season finale episode, "Pretty Much Dead Already". Furthering this, Henry is portrayed by Macsen Lintz, the younger brother of Madison Lintz, the actress who portrayed Sophia.

== Reception ==
=== Critical reception ===
"Still Gotta Mean Something" received generally positive reviews from critics. On Rotten Tomatoes, it holds a 73% with an average rating of 6.73 out of 10, based on 22 reviews. The site's consensus reads: "Though some character motivations remain boggling, a dangerous morality shift between hero and villain -- along with a gratifyingly gruesome death -- make "Still Gotta Mean Something" an enthralling lead-up to the final two episodes of this The Walking Dead season."

=== Ratings ===
The episode received a total viewership of 6.30 million with a 2.6 rating in adults aged 18-49, marking a season-low, and the lowest rated episode since the season two episode "Secrets". This was a decrease from the previous week, which had 6.77 million viewers.
