= 8th Indie Series Awards =

Award ceremony for independent entertainment

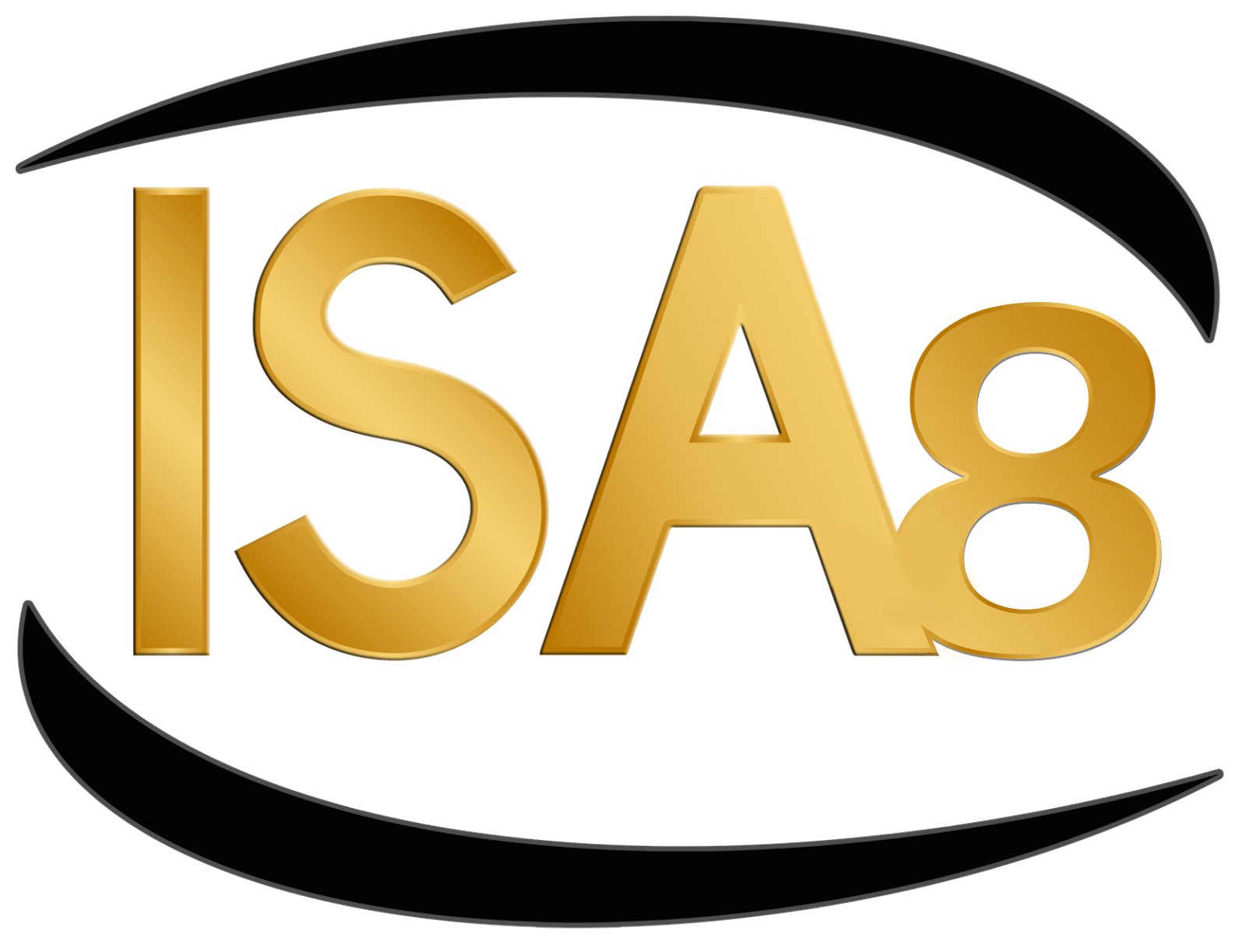
- Date: April 5, 2017
- Site: The Colony Theatre, Los Angeles
- Hosted by: Kit Williamson and John Halbach

Highlights
- Most awards: The Bay (5)
- Most nominations: The Bay (21)

The 8th Indie Series Awards were held on April 5, 2017 at The Colony Theatre in Los Angeles, with the ceremony hosted by EastSiders producers and stars Kit Williamson and John Halbach. Presented by We Love Soaps, the awards recognize independently produced, scripted entertainment created for the web.

In January 2017, it was announced that the number of nominees for the Best Web Series Drama and Comedy awards would be increased from six to eight in each category. The nominees were announced on February 1, 2017. The Bay led with 21 nominations, followed by The Amazing Gayl Pile with 16, both of which broke the previous record of 13 nominations.

== Awards ==
The awards were given on April 5, 2017. Winners are listed first and highlighted in boldface:

**Best Web Series — Drama**: **The Bay**; Best Thing You'll Ever Do; Lemmings; Muck; Out With Dad; People Like Us; Rumuvi; Undetectable	**Best Web Series — Comedy**: **Fame Dogs**; #Adulting; The Amazing Gayl Pile; Break: The Musical; Grip and Electric; High Road; Keith Broke His Leg; The Pioneers
**Best Directing — Drama**: **Rob Raffety, Muck**; Catherine Fordham, Best Thing You'll Ever Do; Leon Cheo, People Like Us; Jason Leaver, Out With Dad; Gregori J. Martin, The Bay; Sam T. Wilson, Undetectable	**Best Directing — Comedy**: **Pablo Camaití, Boy Scauts**; Kerry Harris, Grip and Electric; Justin Harwood, High Road; Andrew Nielson, Plant: The Second Coming; Morgan Waters & Brooks Gray, The Amazing Gayl Pile; Ben Wright Smith & Ted Day, The Pioneers
**Best Writing — Drama**: **Todd Flaherty, Undetectable**; Katie Adams & Jay Moon, At Bay; Monica West, Best Thing You'll Ever Do; Brett Andres, Lemmings; Rob Raffety, Muck; Gregori J. Martin & Wendy Riche, The Bay	**Best Writing — Comedy**: **Kerry Harris & Andrew Burlinson, Grip and Electric**; Sylvia Batey Alcalá, Fame Dogs; Justin Harwood, High Road; Andrew Nielson & David Lavine, Plant: The Second Coming; Keith Powell, Keith Broke His Leg; Morgan Waters & Brooks Gray, The Amazing Gayl Pile
**Best Lead Actor — Drama**: **Todd Flaherty, Undetectable**; Anthony Anderson, Anacostia; Danny Gavigan, Muck; Sean-Michael Bowles, Lemmings; Jonathan Robbins, Out With Dad; Kristos Andrews, The Bay	**Best Lead Actor — Comedy**: **Morgan Waters, The Amazing Gayl Pile**; Ben Baur, #Adulting; Andrew Burlinson, Grip and Electric; Will Farrell, The Other Will Farrell; Mark Mitchinson, High Road; Keith Powell, Keith Broke His Leg
**Best Lead Actress — Drama**: **Monica West, Best Thing You'll Ever Do**; Kate Conway, Out With Dad; Mary Beth Evans, The Bay; Rachael Fox, Here We Wait; Lilly Melgar, The Bay; Ellen Woods, At Bay	**Best Lead Actress — Comedy**: **Liz Days, Plant: The Second Coming**; Sylvia Batey Alcalá, Fame Dogs; Meredith Bishop, Grip and Electric; Mary Bonney, Break: The Musical; Anna Jaller, Right Hand Man; Bhama Roget, The Bhama Show
**Best Supporting Actor — Drama**: **Steven Lim, People Like Us**; Matthew Ashford, The Bay; Nicolas Coster, The Bay; Andrew Glaszek, Undetectable; Christian Leadley, Here We Wait; Jerreme Rodriguez, Undetectable	**Best Supporting Actor — Comedy**: **Sam LeGassick, Rich Keeble Vanity Project**; Brooks Gray, The Amazing Gayl Pile; Adam Henry Garcia, The Chief; Andy King, The Amazing Gayl Pile; Jon Lindstrom, Gridlocked; Manuel Urrego, Right Hand Man
**Best Supporting Actress — Drama**: **Lindsey Middleton, Out With Dad**; Marion A. Akpan, Anacostia; Jade Harlow, The Bay; Lauren B. Martin, Pride: The Series; Myra Lucretia Taylor, Best Thing You'll Ever Do; Karrueche Tran, The Bay	**Best Supporting Actress — Comedy**: **Jill Knox, Keith Broke His Leg**; Inessa Frantowski, The Amazing Gayl Pile; Candelaria Casal, Boy Scauts; Natalie Sutherland, Fame Dogs; Lin Shaye, Grip and Electric; Renee Olstead, Grip and Electric
**Best Guest Actor — Drama**: **Tremayne Norris, Anacostia**; Brandon Beemer, The Bay; Tony Head, Pride: The Series; Dan Stern, Lemmings; Scott Turner Schofield, Pride: The Series; Kevin Spirtas, The Bay	**Best Guest Actor — Comedy**: **Drew Droege, #Adulting**; Jon Daly, The Amazing Gayl Pile; Nic Few, Keith Broke His Leg; Jack McBrayer, The Amazing Gayl Pile; Damion Poitier, F'd; Greg Wise, High Road
**Best Guest Actress — Drama**: **Carolyn Hennesy, The Bay**; Patrika Darbo, The Bay; Melissa Disney, Pride: The Series; Whitney Hoy, Pride: The Series; Elizabeth Hubbard, Anacostia; Kym Whitley, The Bay	**Best Guest Actress — Comedy**: **Emma Thompson, High Road**; Jillian Clare, Fame Dogs; Johanna Day, The Pioneers; Liz Ellis, The Bhama Show; Sas Goldberg, He's With Me; June Diane Raphael, The Amazing Gayl Pile
**Best Ensemble — Drama**: **The Bay**; Anacostia; Back Stabber; Out With Dad; Starting From Now; Undetectable	**Best Ensemble — Comedy**: **Fame Dogs**; The Amazing Gayl Pile; F'd; Grip and Electric; He's With Me; Plant: The Second Coming
**Best Production Design**: **Sarah Asaly, The Bay**; Jill Knox, Keith Broke His Leg; Rosalie Mackintosh, The Amazing Gayl Pile; Charlie "Chaspooley" Robinson, Here We Wait; Scott Michael Salame, Pride: The Series; Elba Sette-Camara, The Sessions	**Best Costume Design**: **Keriann Correia, Working on It** (tie); **Vanessa Fischer, The Amazing Gayl Pile**; Adam Henry Garcia & Mike Perlman, The Chief; Virginia Hemstreet, The Pantsless Detective; Marquita Lopez, The Bay; Mari Viera, Boy Scauts
**Best Special/Visual Effects**: **Mike Barnett, The Shades**; Dipu Bhattacharya, The Pantsless Detective; Robert Chapin, The Hunted: Encore; Jamie Dickinson, Here We Wait; Bernardo Schnitzler, Guido Ferro & Vero Gatti, Psychosomatic	**Best Makeup**: **Ren Bray, The Bay**; George Barr, Roads to Keystone; Jessica Panetta, The Amazing Gayl Pile; Lora Lee, Anacostia; Tanya Cabral, Unconditional Love; Alondra Shields, Gridlocked
**Best Soundtrack**: **Matt Dahan, Break: The Musical**; Judith Avers, Or So the Story Goes; Marcus Thorne Bagala, The Hunted: Encore; B.J. Maier, Diddlisquat; Mike Mason, Fame Dogs; Carolyn Richardson, Funny Married Stuff	**Best Original Song**: **"I Can't Make You Love Me", #Adulting**; "Just At The Start", Break: The Musical; "Save The Fur", The Bhama Show; "Loaded", Or So the Story Goes; "My 'So-Called' Co-Star Life", My "So-Called" Co Star Life; "Print", Break: The Musical; "Shut In", The Bhama Show
**Best Editing**: **Morgan Waters, The Amazing Gayl Pile**; Christopher Datugan, People Like Us; Neil Fennell, Ghost Light; Matthew Kreiner, Lemmings; Bernardo Schnitzler & Guido Ferro, Psychosomatic; Jeremy Snyder & Tiffany Petitt, The Bay	**Best Cinematography**: **Travis Edwards, Muck**; Colin Bryant, Classic Hollywood; Henry Sansom, The Amazing Gayl Pile; Logan Schneider, Grip and Electric; Matthias Schubert, The Bay; Looi Wan Ping, People Like Us
**Best Original Score**: **Miles Ito, Here We Wait**; Jonathan M. Roe, The Pantsless Detective; Massimo Sammi, Zeroes; Matt Dahan, Break: The Musical; Michael Bahnmiller, Afterlife; Tiffany Topol, Best Thing You'll Ever Do
