= Adulting (web series) =

American comedy-drama web series

#Adulting
- Created by: Ben Baur; Thandi Tolmay
- Written by: Ben Baur; Thandi Tolmay; Zac Hug
- Directed by: TJ Marchbank
- Starring: Ben Baur; Thandi Tolmay
- Theme music composer: Gregory Nabours
- Country of origin: United States
- Original language: English
- No. of seasons: 2
- No. of episodes: 9

Production
- Executive producers: Ben Baur; Thandi Tolmay
- Cinematography: Matt Miller (season two)
- Editor: Erik Anderson (season two)

Original release
- Network: YouTube
- Release: January 14, 2016 – November 29, 2018

#Adulting is an American comedy-drama web series created by and starring Ben Baur and Thandi Tolmay. It follows two friends, Max and Faye, who are nearing 30 and have yet to put their lives in order.

After producing two episodes and launching them on YouTube, Baur and Tolmay funded the production of four more through a May 2016 Kickstarter crowdfunding campaign that raised nearly US $19,000.

== Premise ==
Best friends Max and Faye are faced with the reality that they are nearly 30 years old and have no money, careers, or boyfriends.

== Cast ==
- Ben Baur as Max
- Thandi Tolmay as Faye
- Peter Sudarso as Austin
- Michael Perl as George (season one)
- Aubrey Marquez as Eddie (season two)
- Keir Kirkegaard as David (season two)

== Development and production ==
Ben Baur and Thandi Tolmay, who graduated from The American Musical and Dramatic Academy with series director TJ Marchbank, conceived #Adulting while celebrating Baur's 29th birthday. Baur said, "We came up with the idea for #Adulting because we wanted to tell stories that were tragically relatable to this really odd time in life, when you're supposed to be a grown-up and you're just ... not." Baur is known for starring in the 2012–2015 web series Hunting Season, and in 2015 was named by Out to its Out100 list.

After two self-funded episodes launched on YouTube were well received by fans, Baur and Tolmay funded the production of four more through a May 2016 Kickstarter crowdfunding campaign that raised nearly US $19K. Guest stars include Drew Droege and David Del Rio. The new episodes premiered on October 7, 2016 at the Brooklyn Web Fest, and were later put on YouTube.

== Episodes ==
=== Season one (2016) ===
No. overall	No. in season	Title	Directed by	Written by	Original release date	Length
1	1	"Meet Max and Faye"	TJ Marchbank	Ben Baur & Thandi Tolmay	January 14, 2016	4:55
Faye reveals that her ex-boyfriend was threatened by her close friendship with Max.
2	2	"Hipster Hell Hail Mary"	TJ Marchbank	Thandi Tolmay	April 22, 2016	6:44
Faye finds that she has little in common with her hipster internet date, who questions her about Hemingway and orders gluten-free pizza.
3	3	"Pictures of Posteriors"	TJ Marchbank	Zac Hug and Ben Baur	October 16, 2016	8:53
Faye gets Max hired on a photo shoot, but commands him to resist his usual urges and not have sex with any of the models. Guest: Drew Droege as Dewey.
4	4	"Malbec and Malice"	TJ Marchbank	Thandi Tolmay	October 16, 2016	7:49
Max and Faye decide to fix their lives, but a bottle of wine leads them to a sobering evening.
5	5	"Downward Dog Disaster"	TJ Marchbank	Thandi Tolmay & Ben Baur	October 16, 2016	8:53
Max drags Faye to a yoga class, where he gets special attention from the instructor. Guest: David Del Rio as Damien.
6	6	"Bathroom Boyfriend Bereavement"	TJ Marchbank	Thandi Tolmay & Ben Baur	October 16, 2016	13:20
Faye faces a personal crisis while Max is busy at a business meeting. Guest: Peter Sudarso as Austin.

=== Season two (2018) ===
No. overall	No. in season	Title	Directed by	Written by	Original release date	Length
7	1	"Birthdays, Breakups, & Brunch. Part One: "The Birthday""	TJ Marchbank	Thandi Tolmay & Ben Baur	November 29, 2018	4:02
Max is having a personal crisis as he turns 29 years old.
8	2	"Birthdays, Breakups, & Brunch. Part Two: "The Breakup""	TJ Marchbank	Thandi Tolmay & Ben Baur	November 29, 2018	2:53
Austin asks Max to move in with him, and Faye wakes up in bed with Austin's bro coworker David.
9	3	"Birthdays, Breakups, & Brunch. Part 3: "The Brunch""	TJ Marchbank	Thandi Tolmay & Ben Baur	November 29, 2018	4:56
Max tells Faye and Eddie that he broke up with Austin.

== Reception ==
Katrina Alonso of Out called #Adulting "hilariously awkward". Writing for Instinct, Adam Dupuis deemed the series "binge worthy".

=== Awards and nominations ===
Year	Award	Category	Nominee(s)	Result	Ref.
2017	8th Indie Series Awards	Best Web Series — Comedy		Nominated	
2017	8th Indie Series Awards	Best Lead Actor — Comedy	Ben Baur as Alex	Nominated	
2017	8th Indie Series Awards	Best Guest Actor — Comedy	Drew Droege as Dewey	Won	
2017	8th Indie Series Awards	Best Original Song	"I Can't Make You Love Me"	Won	
2017	LA Webfest	Outstanding Comedy Series	Ben Baur, Thandi Tolmay, TJ Marchbank, Rob Craven, Mark Heidel	Nominated	
2017	LA Webfest	Outstanding Lead Actor — Comedy	Ben Baur as Max	Nominated	
2017	LA Webfest	Outstanding Lead Actress — Comedy	Thandi Tolmay as Faye	Won	
2017	LA Webfest	Outstanding Guest Actor — Comedy	Michael Perl as George	Won	
2017	LA Webfest	Outstanding Guest Actor — Comedy	Drew Droege as Dewey	Nominated	
2017	LA Webfest	Outstanding Directing — Comedy	TJ Marchbank	Nominated	
2017	LA Webfest	Outstanding Writing — Comedy	Ben Baur, Thandi Tolmay, Zach Hug	Nominated	
2019	10th Indie Series Awards	Best Comedy Series		Nominated	
2019	10th Indie Series Awards	Best Lead Actress — Comedy	Thandi Tolmay as Faye	Nominated	
2019	10th Indie Series Awards	Best Lead Actor — Comedy	Ben Baur as Max	Nominated	
2019	10th Indie Series Awards	Best Writing — Comedy	Ben Baur, Thandi Tolmay	Nominated	
