= Jack Ferver =

American choreographer and performer

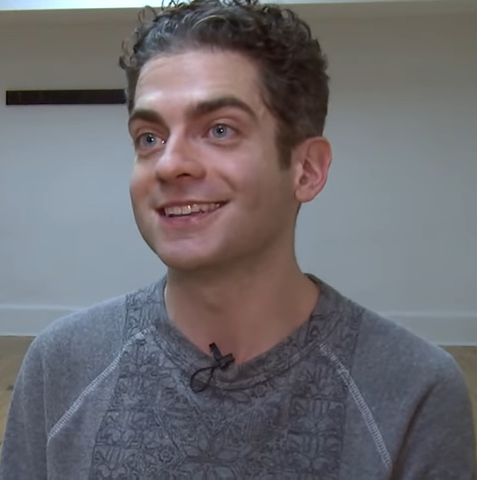
- Ferver in 2015
- Born: 1979 (age 46–47); Prairie du Sac, Wisconsin, U.S.
- Education: Interlochen Arts Academy
- Known for: Choreography
- Website: Official website

Jack Ferver (born 1979) is an American dancer, choreographer, actor, and professor. They are known for their dance-theatre shows that examine trauma, otherness, and queerness, as well as for their portrayal of a character known as the Little Lad in a 2007 Berries and Cream Starburst commercial.

Upon graduating from Interlochen Arts Academy, Ferver moved to New York City and appeared in their first film role in Outside Providence (1999). After acting in film, television, and theater for several years, Ferver began performing their own full-length dance pieces in 2007. Their work with artist Marc Swanson on the performance piece Chambre in the mid-2010s earned a nomination at the 2016 Bessie Awards. Ferver teaches at Bard College and cohosts a podcast about the dance world.

== Early life ==
Jack Ferver grew up in rural Wisconsin, U.S., first in Prairie du Sac and later in Sauk City, where they experienced harassment and bullying throughout their youth as "a little gay kid". Ferver began working with a teacher who was influenced by Martha Graham when they were 13. They received a scholarship to Interlochen Arts Academy for their senior year of high school, where they trained and met future collaborator Reid Bartelme.

== Career ==
After attending Interlochen, Ferver moved to New York City. In 1997, intending to dance and act, Ferver was hired to perform in several commercials as well as for their first film role in Outside Providence (1999). Ferver hoped to land more film roles but had trouble finding a talent agent and recalled rejection from casting directors who had trouble viewing them as a young person, despite being eighteen years old when Outside Providence was filmed. Around this time, they began to take classes at the Martha Graham School of Contemporary Dance.

Ferver continued to appear onstage and act in television and film. In 1999, they performed in the premiere of Betty's Summer Vacation at Playwrights Horizons. In 2000, they appeared on several episodes of the Comedy Central TV series Strangers with Candy. Throughout the early and mid-2000s, Ferver performed in theater, film, and television, appearing in plays in New York, Washington, D.C., and San Diego. In 2001, they appeared in the film Way Off Broadway and in 2005 they performed in the New York Musical Theatre Festival adaptation of the film But I'm a Cheerleader. With the QWAN Company, which Ferver founded, they created and performed in satirical live readings of the films Notes on a Scandal and Black Swan titled Notes!!! (2010) and Swan!!! (2011), respectively.

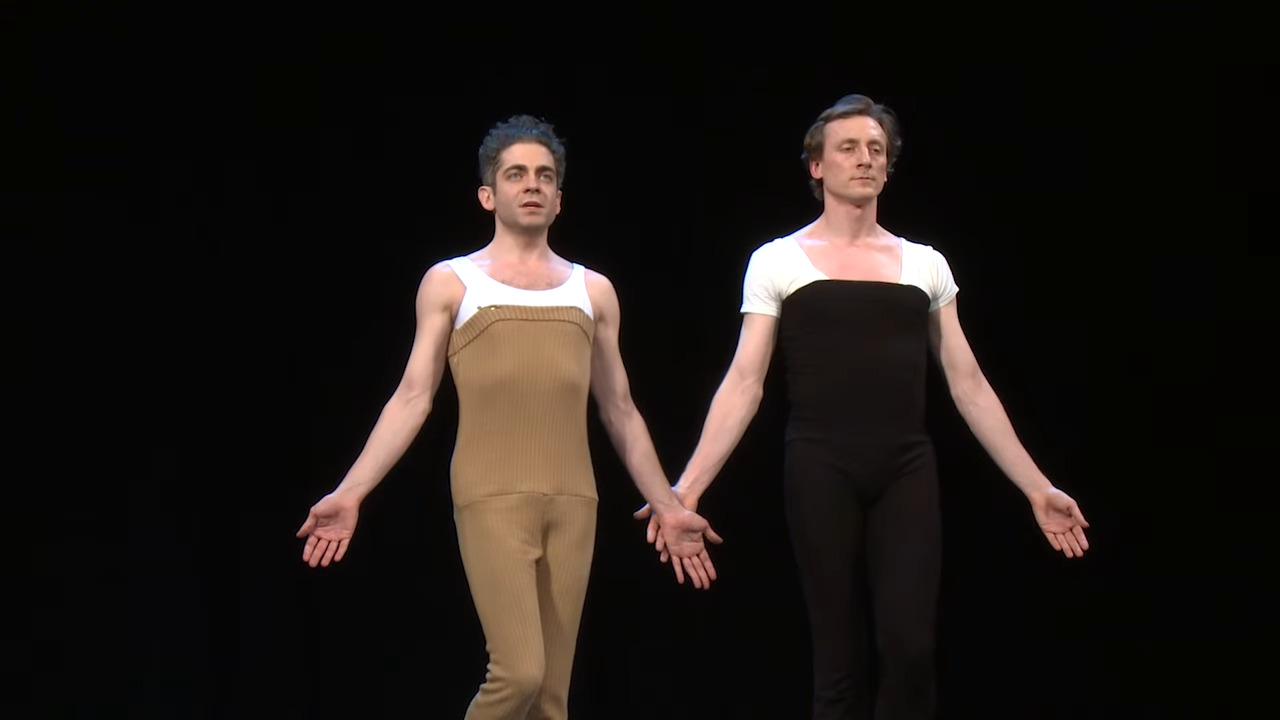
Ferver and Reid Bartelme in Night Light Bright Light (2015)

In 2007, Ferver began performing full-length dance pieces with their work When We Were Young and Filled with Fear. In the late 2000s, they presented their work at Dixon Place (When We Were Young and Meat), Danspace Project (Death Is Certain), and Abrons Arts Center (A Movie Star Needs a Movie), the latter as part of the American Realness Festival. As a dancer and choreographer, Ferver has collaborated with Interlochen classmate Bartelme, dramaturg Joshua Lubin-Levy, and artist Marc Swanson. Chambre, one of Ferver's pieces with Swanson, was nominated in 2016 for a Bessie Award.

Ferver appeared as a character known as the Little Lad in a 2007 commercial for Berries and Cream Starburst candies. The advertisement, which features Ferver performing a simple dance while singing "Berries and cream!", spread widely and generated parodies and mashups on YouTube that year, as did a second video in which Ferver as the Lad led a tutorial for the dance. Ferver briefly revived the character in late 2021 when the tutorial video was reposted to TikTok by podcast host Justin McElroy and the Little Lad's dance became a popular TikTok trend.

As of 2020, Ferver taught at Bard College and was also a visiting professor at New York University. In addition to their dance work, Ferver has appeared in other movies and TV shows, including Gayby (2012) and High Maintenance (2016). Ferver choreographed and appeared as Tinker Bell in Bard College's 2018 production of Leonard Bernstein's musical Peter Pan. They also signed on in 2019 to choreograph Jeremy O. Harris's play A Boy's Company Presents: 'Tell Me If I'm Hurting You', but the show was postponed due to the COVID-19 pandemic. Ferver choreographed the off-Broadway musical The Last Bimbo of the Apocalypse at Signature Theatre Company in 2025.

Ferver and Bartelme, who had both been fellows at the New York Public Library for the Performing Arts, began hosting the podcast What's Going On with Dance and Stuff in 2017, with a consistent rule of releasing an episode every Friday. Topics discussed, which often tend to be "more about the 'stuff' than the 'dance,'" according to Dance Magazine, include contemporary dance performances, books, Martha Graham, astrology, and Ferver and Bartelme's own work.

== Style ==
Ferver is most known for their dance-theatre shows that examine trauma, otherness, and queerness. In interviews, Ferver has cited Martha Graham and her autobiography Blood Memory as a particular influence in their exploration of concepts like "contraction and release", dark facets of the human psyche, as well as ritual and repetition. Expression of gender and sexuality are central themes throughout Ferver's work. Their piece Two Alike, described as a "psycho-sexual semi-autobiographical choreographic piece" explored their childhood through repetition. In Everything Is Imaginable, Ferver choreographed four soloists to "collectively exhume their personal queer histories and celebrate their childhood icons."

== Personal life ==
In 2008, Ferver lived in Brooklyn, New York. Their partner is filmmaker and artist Jeremy Jacob.

== Performances ==
=== Dance ===
Year (Note: Denotes the date and place of the piece's world premiere; many of Ferver's pieces have subsequently been presented elsewhere.)	Title	Venue	Role	Notes
2007	When We Were Young and Filled with Fear	Dixon Place	Choreographer, dancer	
2008	Meat: A Diptych	Dixon Place	Choreographer, dancer	
2009	Death Is Certain	Danspace Project	Choreographer, dancer	
2009	A Movie Star Needs a Movie	Abrons Arts Center	Choreographer, dancer	
2010	Rumble Ghost	Performance Space 122	Writer, choreographer, dancer	
2011	Two Alike	Contemporary Arts Museum Houston	Writer, choreographer, dancer	
2011	Me, Michelle	Museum of Arts and Design	Choreographer, dancer	
2012	Mon, Ma, Mes	French Institute Alliance Française	Creator, performer	
2013	All of a Sudden	Abrons Arts Center	Choreographer, dancer	
2014	Chambre	Richard B. Fisher Center for the Performing Arts	Choreographer, dancer	
2015	Night Light Bright Light	Abrons Arts Center	Choreographer, dancer	
2016	I Want You to Want Me	The Kitchen	Writer, choreographer, dancer	
2018	Everything Is Imaginable	New York Live Arts	Choreographer, dancer	
2020	Nowhere Apparent	New York Public Library for the Performing Arts	Choreographer, dancer	
2022	Is Global Warming Camp? and Other Forms of Theatrical Distance for the End of the World	Massachusetts Museum of Contemporary Art	Choreographer, performer	
2025	My Town	Experimental Media and Performing Arts Center	Choreographer, performer	

=== Theater ===
Year	Title	Venue	Role	Notes
1999	Rosencrantz and Guildenstern Are Dead	Long Wharf Theatre	Alfred	
1999	Betty's Summer Vacation	Playwrights Horizons	Voice 1	
2000	Black Milk Quartet	Ohio Theatre		
2000	Dead End	Huntington Theatre Company		
2001	Princess Turandot	Westport Country Playhouse	Truffaldino	
2001	The Square Root of Minus One	Market Theater	Wiggins	
2003	Camelot	Arena Stage	Mordred	
2004	Sex*But	Belt Theater		
2005	But I'm a Cheerleader	Theatre at Saint Clements	Joel	Part of the New York Musical Theatre Festival
2006	Christmas on Mars	Old Globe Theatre	Nissim	
2010	Notes!!!	–		Staged reading, with QWAN Company
2011	Swan!!!	Performance Space 122	Lily	Staged reading, with QWAN Company
2018	Peter Pan	Richard B. Fisher Center for the Performing Arts	Tinker Bell; choreographer	
2025	The Last Bimbo of the Apocalypse	Signature Theatre Company	Choreographer	

=== Film ===
Year	Title	Role	Notes
1999	Outside Providence	Irving "Jiz" Waltham	
2001	Mean People Suck	Jesse Milton	Short film
2001	Way Off Broadway	Phil	
2007	Shortcut to Happiness	Jabez's assistant	
2012	Gayby	Jamie	
2015	Front Cover	Pascal	
2023	Nowhere Apparent	Dancer, choreographer	Dance film based on 2020 performance
2023	Wüm	Bennett	Short film

=== Television ===
Year	Title	Role	Notes
2000	Strangers with Candy	Jimmy Tickles	
2006	Law & Order: Criminal Intent	Lenny's assistant	
2010	The Big C	Receptionist	
2012	Hunting Season	Nick	
2016	Deadbeat	Spencer	
2016	High Maintenance	Jason	
