= Filth City =

- Directed by: Andy King
- Written by: Andy King; Danny Polishchuk
- Produced by: Andrew Ferguson; Matt King
- Starring: Pat Thornton; Melinda Shankar; Danny Polishchuk
- Cinematography: Ian Macmillan
- Edited by: Marianna Khoury
- Music by: Poor Paul
- Production company: LaRue Productions
- Distributed by: LaRue Entertainment
- Release date: March 25, 2017 (CFF)
- Running time: 105 minutes
- Country: Canada
- Language: English

Filth City is a 2017 Canadian comedy film, directed by Andy King.

The film stars Pat Thornton as Mayor Hogg, the mayor of York City who is embroiled in a political scandal. The film is loosely based on the crack cocaine scandal surrounding former Toronto mayor Rob Ford. The cast also includes Melinda Shankar, Andy King, Danny Polishchuk, Melanie Nicholls-King, Kathleen Phillips, Lenno Britos, Michael Copeman, Brian Kaulback, Kayla Lorette, Brooks Gray and Chris Locke.

The film was shot in Hamilton, Ontario in fall 2015. The film was originally scheduled to be released as a television film on Super Channel in 2016, but following that service's bankruptcy, it instead premiered theatrically at the 2017 Canadian Filmmakers' Festival.

Rob Ford's brother, Doug Ford, denounced the film and threatened King (without mentioning his name) by saying, "Make sure he is not crossing the street when I am driving down the road." King called his threat "outrageous".

== Cast ==
- Pat Thornton as Mayor Hogg
- Danny Polishchuk as Officer Randy Kapowski
- Andy King as Officer Phil Coke
- Melinda Shankar as Monica
- Melanie Nicholls-King as Detective Mason
- Michael Copeman as Captain Lester Schultz
- Kathleen Phillips as Eve Knight
- Brian Kaulback as Detective Sgt. O'Donovan
- Kayla Lorette as Rhonda Hogg
- Brooks Gray as Gerry Popadick
- Chris Locke as Detective Ray Zitt
