= Mean People Suck =

- Screenshot from Mean People Suck. From left, Eric Christian Olsen, Dominique Swain.
- Directed by: Matthew Cole Weiss
- Screenplay by: Matthew Cole Weiss
- Produced by: Anabel Manchester; Matthew Cole Weiss
- Starring: Dominique Swain; James Franco; Eric Christian Olsen; Beverley Mitchell
- Cinematography: Jonathan Cohen
- Edited by: Blaine Hope
- Music by: Adam Podrat
- Production companies: Mama's Boy Productions; Tisch School of the Arts (NYU)
- Release date: April 2001
- Running time: 8 minutes
- Country: United States
- Language: English
- Budget: $10,000

Mean People Suck is an NYU student film released in 2001. It is directed by Matthew Cole Weiss and stars Dominique Swain as Kate, James Franco as Casey, and Eric Christian Olsen as Nick, with a supporting role by Beverley Mitchell as Kate's sister.

Mean People Suck was available for viewing on Spike.com from 2007 to 2016.

== Plot summary ==
Three stubborn teenagers place a bet over which one of them is the meanest.

== Cast ==
- Dominique Swain as Kate
- James Franco as Casey
- Eric Christian Olsen as Nick
- Beverley Mitchell as Kate's sister
- Michael Higgins as Old Man
- Eric Axen as Joey
- Jack Ferver as Jesse Milton
- Matthew Cole Weiss as Boy in Funeral Home
- Julie Schubert as Diner Patron #1
- Beth Marshall as Diner Patron #2
- Ryan Shogren as Boy in Locker Room
- Rob Cameron as Boy in Locker Room #2
- Kevin Thoms as Boy in Locker Room #3

== Release ==
=== Festival screenings ===
The film premiered at the First Run Film Festival in April, 2001, It screened at multiple festivals after that, receiving Best Student Film at the Fargo Film Festival on March 2, 2002.
