= Front Cover =

2015 film by Ray Yeung

- Theatrical release poster
- Directed by: Ray Yeung
- Written by: Ray Yeung
- Produced by: Kaer Vanice; Ray Yeung
- Starring: Jake Choi; James Chen; Elizabeth Sung; Ming Lee; Jennifer Neala Page; Sonia Villani; Li Jun Li
- Cinematography: Lee Eun-ah
- Edited by: Joseph Gutowski
- Music by: Paul Turner; Darren Morze
- Production companies: NewVoice Production; Fortissimo Films
- Distributed by: Strand Releasing
- Release dates: May 28, 2015 (SIFF); August 6, 2016 (United States)
- Running time: 87 minutes
- Country: United States
- Languages: English; Mandarin; Cantonese
- Box office: $26,409

Front Cover is a 2015 American romantic comedy-drama film written, directed, and co-produced by Ray Yeung. It stars Jake Choi and James Chen, with Elizabeth Sung, Ming Lee, Jennifer Neala Page, Sonia Villani, and Li Jun Li in supporting roles. It follows an openly gay New York City fashion stylist who, rejecting his traditional Asian upbringing, is assigned to style a famous Beijing actor for an important photo shoot for his firm.

The film had its world premiere at the Seattle International Film Festival on May 28, 2015, and was given a limited theatrical release in the United States on August 6, 2016, by Strand Releasing. It received mixed-to-positive reviews from critics.

== Plot ==
Front Cover tells the story of Ryan Fu, a gay Chinese American who rejects his Asian heritage and has learned to suppress it to climb up the social ladder. Through talent and hard work he attains his dream job as an assistant to Francesca, a celebrity fashion stylist. One day Francesca assigns Ryan to style Ning, an actor who has just arrived from Beijing, for a top magazine photo shoot. Ning dismisses Ryan's initial Western styling and demands Ryan create an image for him that represents the power of the new China. Their opinions clash, resulting in a strained working relationship.

Over the following days, they socialize while working together and discover not only do they have a lot in common, a mutual attraction begins to develop. As they get closer, Ryan reveals that he detests his Chinese heritage because he is ashamed of his impoverished upbringing. Ning also opens up and confesses that he is closeted. As they fall in love, a Chinese tabloid magazine exposes Ning as gay. Terrified of the impact it will have on his career, Ning begs Ryan to lie for him at a press conference. Ryan must now decide whether to help Ning or stay true to himself.

== Cast ==
- Jake Choi as Ryan Fu
- James Chen as Qi Xiao Ning
- Elizabeth Sung as Yen
- Jennifer Neala Page as Janet
- Sonia Villani as Francesca
- Ming Lee as Ba
- Li Jun Li as Miao
- Benjamin Thys as James
- Peter Benson as Tim
- Rachel Lu as Xin
- Kristen Hung as Ai
- Wayne Chang as Chun
- Scott Chan as Bao
- Ben Baur as Eddie
- Tom Ligon as Gus LaMar
- Brian Knoebel as Dex
- Shenell Edmonds as Amy
- Chris Kies as Colin
- Feiga Martinez as Margarita
- Jack Ferver as Pascal
- Susan Louise O'Connor as Reporter
- James Pravasilis as Technician

== Release ==
Front Cover had its world premiere at the 41st Seattle International Film Festival on May 28, 2015. It opened the 26th Hong Kong Lesbian & Gay Film Festival on September 19, and was screened at several film festivals.

In September 2015, Strand Releasing acquired North American distribution rights to the film, while Edko Films picked up Hong Kong and Macau distribution rights. It was theatrically released in New York City on August 5, 2016, in Los Angeles on August 12, and in Hong Kong on October 25.

== Reception ==
=== Box office ===
Front Cover grossed $26,409 in the United States, and earned an additional $57,832 in domestic video sales.

=== Critical response ===
On the review aggregator website Rotten Tomatoes, 83% of 12 critics' reviews are positive, with an average rating of 5.2/10. Metacritic, which uses a weighted average, assigned the film a score of 52 out of 100, based on 9 critics, indicating "mixed or average" reviews.

Jeannette Catsoulis of The New York Times stated, "Front Cover still strains to surmount its thin narrative and unfortunate dips into clichéd cultural comedy. Yet the acting is reserved and sincere, the two leads exhibiting a believable attraction that Mr. Yeung takes care not to disrupt." Gary Goldstein of the Los Angeles Times described the film as "a root-worthy picture with its share of warm, amusing moments, an attractive pair of leads and a vivid use of Big Apple locales." Stephanie Merry of The Washington Post gave it 2 out of 4 stars and opined, "Front Cover is weighed down by heavy-handed dialogue and a melodramatic score." Edmund Lee of the South China Morning Post gave the film 3 out of 5 stars and concluded his review by writing, "Front Cover does deliver as a nice little romantic comedy with a pair of endearing leads." Godfrey Cheshire of RogerEbert.com gave it 3 out of 4 stars and remarked, "Yeung's [screenplay] is subtle and assured, tracing an emotional arc that's believably nuanced." Cheshire also praised Choi and Chen for their "exceptionally strong lead performances."

=== Accolades ===
Awards

- Best Screenplay, FilmOut San Diego, 2016
- Jury Award Best Domestic Feature, Outflix Film Festival Memphis, 2016
- Audience Award for Best Narrative Film, Boston Asian American Film Festival, 2016
- Best Full Feature, Serile Filmului Gay International Film Festival Romania, 2016
- Best Actor (James Chen), Australia Golden Koala Chinese Film Festival, 2017

Nominations

- New American Cinema Award, Seattle International Film Festival, 2015
- Q Hugo Award, Chicago International Film Festival, 2015
- Best Director, Australia Golden Koala Chinese Film Festival, 2017
- Best Film, Australia Golden Koala Chinese Film Festival, 2017
