= Do Not Send Us Astray =

- The Walking Dead episode
- Gavin as he appears in a hallucination of Morgan
- Episode no.: Season 8 Episode 13
- Directed by: Jeffrey F. January
- Written by: Angela Kang; Matthew Negrete
- Cinematography by: Stephen Campbell
- Editing by: Alan Cody
- Original air date: March 25, 2018
- Running time: 43 minutes

Guest appearances
- Callan McAuliffe as Alden; Avi Nash as Siddiq; Jayson Warner Smith as Gavin; Cooper Andrews as Jerry; Jason Douglas as Tobin; Kenric Green as Scott; Joshua Mikel as Jared; Elizabeth Ludlow as Arat; Kerry Cahill as Dianne; Macsen Lintz as Henry; James Chen as Kal; Peter Zimmerman as Eduardo; Ted Huckabee as Bruce; Karen Ceesay as Bertie; Mike Seal as Gary; Anthony Lopez as Oscar; Jason Burkey as Kevin; Ilan Srulovicz as Wesley; Dan Johnson as Derek; Katy O'Brian as Katy; Peggy Sheffield as Dana; Nick Arapoglou as Kurt

Episode chronology
| ← Previous "The Key" | Next → "Still Gotta Mean Something" |
- The Walking Dead season 8

"Do Not Send Us Astray" is the thirteenth episode of the eighth season of the post-apocalyptic horror television series The Walking Dead, which aired on AMC on March 25, 2018. It was written by Angela Kang and Matthew Negrete, and directed by Jeffrey F. January. It also features the final appearance of Tobin (Jason Douglas).

== Plot ==
Morgan, alone in the woods, starts having visions of Gavin, a dead Savior lieutenant he was intent on killing but could not, who was then unexpectedly killed by Henry. He attacks Gavin, before realizing he is having hallucinations.

Having taken over leadership of the Saviors following Negan's disappearance, Simon leads the Saviors' convoy to the Hilltop, now intent on wiping out any survivors rather than trying to coerce them into submission as Negan wanted. The convoy's traverse is noticed by Hilltop scouts and the community begins preparing for the imminent attack. When the Savior convoy reaches the community at night, Maggie contacts Simon over walkie-talkie, warning him that she will personally execute all of the Savior prisoners that they still hold captive, should he mobilize an attack. Simon says the prisoners are no longer members of the Saviors since they were captured, much to the prisoners' dismay. As they exchange words, Daryl suddenly arrives, riding up on his motorcycle, and starts opening fire at the Saviors with a machine gun, forcing them to start their attack on the Hilltop, and the battle begins in earnest.

Prepared for the attack, the Hilltop soldiers attack the Saviors from highly defensible positions, taking out several of their numbers. In the midst of the chaos, Simon takes Dwight to work their way behind the attackers. Inside the community, Simon spots Tara and begins to hunt her down. However, Dwight, who has secretly sided against the Saviors, shoots Tara in the shoulder with an untainted arrow, saving her from being killed by Simon. Meanwhile, Rick and his other forces charge in from the outside, chasing out the remaining Saviors. Rick reveals to Maggie that he had attempted to kill Negan just before the attack but failed and feels some responsibility for how this attack went.

The next day, the Hilltop community bury their dead and tend to their wounded, unaware that the Saviors had coated their weapons in walker viscera for the attack. Among those injured is Tobin, Carol's former boyfriend from Alexandria. Daryl accuses Tara of trusting Dwight after having seen him as part of Simon's forces and escaping with the other Saviors, but Tara insists Dwight is still loyal to them.

That night, those infected by walker blood, including Tobin, Kevin and Wesley succumb to the infection and turn into walkers, attacking the sleeping residents of the Hilltop. The walkers manage to kill The Kingdom's doctors, Dana and Kurt along with others. The remaining residents react quickly to put down the walkers, with Carol herself stabbing the reanimated Tobin in the head, saving Bertie. The group realizes that the saviors had tainted their weapons with walker blood. Knowing this, infected with walker blood, Alexandria resident Bruce begs for the group to put him down before he turns. Concurrently, Henry approaches the Savior prisoners with a gun, demanding to know which one of them killed his older brother, Benjamin. When none of them respond, Henry unlocks the pen and enters to threaten them directly. However, one of the prisoners, who had also been hit by walker-coated weapons, reanimates and starts attacking them. In the confusion, another Savior, Jared, wrestles the gun from Henry and leads the other Saviors, as well as Gregory, to escape from the Hilltop during the turmoil.

When dawn breaks, Maggie oversees more burials of their friends. They discover the missing Savior prisoners, though a few, led by Alden, offer to stay and help the Hilltop even though they know they will still be treated as prisoners. Additionally, Carol and Morgan go to search for Henry, who appears to have disappeared.

== Development ==
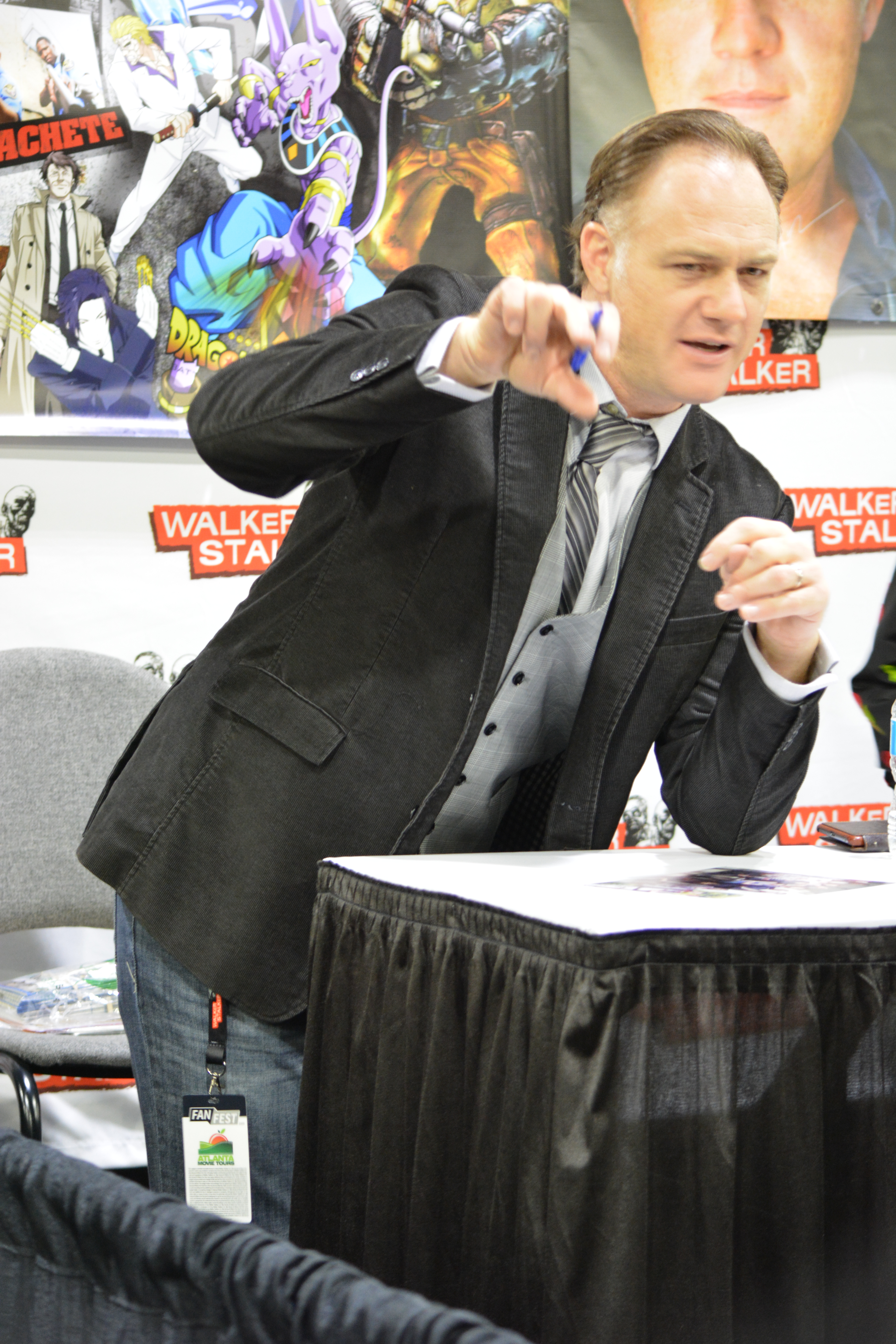
Jason Douglas makes his final recurring appearance as Tobin in this episode

This episode features the death of the recurring character Tobin, portrayed by Jason Douglas, who has been on the series since the episode "Forget" from the fifth season. In an interview Douglas said: "Up until the moment I found out, I had no clue that it was imminent, but I've always been expecting it."

== Reception ==
=== Critical reception ===
The episode, "Do Not Send Us Astray" received generally positive reviews from critics. On Rotten Tomatoes, it holds a 71% with an average rating of 7.3 out of 10, based on 21 reviews. The site's consensus reads: ""Do Not Send Us Astray" focuses on a fan favorite and features some exciting battle action—although with a bit of a mid-episode lull."

=== Ratings ===
The episode received a total viewership of 6.77 million with a 3.0 rating in adults aged 18–49. This was a slight increase from the previous week, which had 6.66 million viewers.
