= Get Your Juices Going =

Single by Starburst
- Released: 26 August 2002
- Genre: Pop
- Length: 4:03
- Label: Jive Electro
- Songwriter(s): James Appleby; Effem Foods
- Producer(s): James Appleby

"Get Your Juices Going" is the only single by Australian pop group Starburst, named after the confectionery brand of the same name. The song was released on 26 August 2002 and peaked at number 28 on the ARIA Singles Chart.

== Background and release ==
Mars Australia and its advertising agency, D'Arcy, created the fictional pop group Starburst and song, with its lyrics written by copywriters, built around the flavours: peach, apple, cherry, melon, strawberry and banana.

D'Arcy's national creative director, Mark Collis said "If you look at the song, you really would not know it's for a confectionery brand. We wanted to try and get the song as high on the charts as we can. We held off letting people know it was an advertising campaign."

== Track listing ==
CD single (JEL007)

1. "Get Your Juices Going" – 4:03
2. "Get Your Juices Going" (Vocal Remix; Radio Edit) – 3:38
3. "Get Your Juices Going" (Dance Mix) – 7:01
4. "Get Your Juices Going" (Dub Mix) – 5:51

== Charts ==
Weekly chart performance for "Get Your Juices Going"
Chart (2002)	Peak position
Australia (ARIA)	28
