= The Amazing Gayl Pile =

2014 Canadian web series

The Amazing Gayl Pile is a Canadian web series created by Morgan Waters and Brooks Gray, which follows one man's misguided quest to conquer the world of home shopping, and become king of the TV pitchman game. First created in 2014, the show stars Morgan Waters, Brooks Gray, Inessa Frantowski, Andy King, Leo Scherman, Daniel Stolfi and Natasha Bromfield. The series has received numerous awards and has screened at festivals around the world; in 2017, it won the Canadian Screen Award for Best Directing and Best Original Program or Series produced for Digital Media - Fiction. Also in 2017, the series broke the record for most nominations at the Indie Series Awards in Los Angeles.

The series premiered in 2014 on Sarah Silverman's online network Jash, and was also available for a time on NBC's now-defunct digital channel Seeso. The Amazing Gayl Pile is now on CBC's digital channel, CBC Gem and was produced with the participation of the Independent Production Fund.

The Amazing Gayl Pile: Last Resort is the fifth and final season of the series. It can be watched on CBC Gem in Canada and Amazon Video Direct in UK and USA.

== Awards and festivals ==
=== 2014 ===
- Raindance Webfest Nominee - Best International Series
- Raindance Webfest Nominee - Best Lead Actor

=== 2015 ===
- HollyWeb Festival Winner - Best Comedy
- Seattle Web Fest Winner - Best Production Design
- Indie Series Awards Winner - Best Directing - Comedy
- Indie Series Awards Nominee - Best Web Series - Comedy
- Toronto Web Fest Nominee - Best writing, Best Comedy
- IAWTV Awards Nominee - Best Directing - Comedy
- IAWTV Awards Nominee - Best Writing
- Canadian Screen Awards Nominee - Best Original Program/Series
- Canadian Screen Awards Nominee - Best Performance (Morgan Waters)

=== 2017 ===
- 16 Indie Series Award nominations
- Canadian Screen Awards - Best Original Program or Series produced for Digital Media - Fiction, Best Direction in a Program or Series Produced for Digital Media
- International Emmy Awards Nominee - Best Short Form

=== 2019 ===
- Canadian Screen Awards Nominee - Best Lead Performance (Morgan Waters)
- Canadian Screen Awards Nominee - Best Supporting Performance (Inessa Frantowski)
