= Starburst (candy) =

Chewy fruit-flavoured sweets

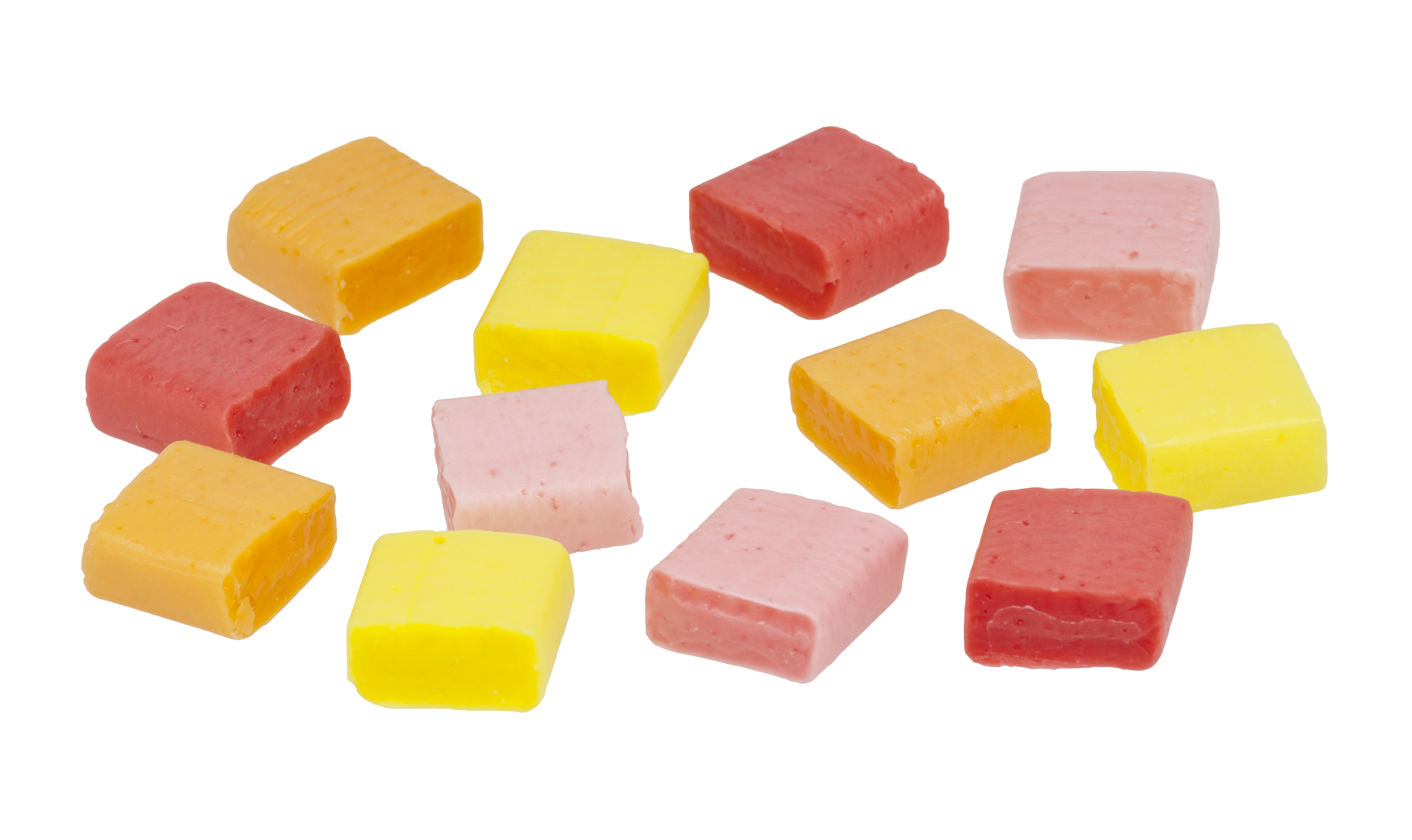
- Cherry (red), lemon (yellow), strawberry (pink) and orange (orange) flavoured starburst candy
- Product type: Box shaped taffy coloured to its flavour.
- Current owner: Mars
- Produced by: Wrigley Company
- Country: United Kingdom
- Introduced: 1959; 67 years ago (Note: First launched as "Opal Fruits". In 1967 renamed as "M&M's Fruit Chewies", and "Starburst" in 1968.)
- Markets: Asia, Canada, Europe, United States and Mexico
- Tagline: Unexplainably Juicy
- Website: starburst.com

Starburst (originally known as Opal Fruits) is the brand name of a box-shaped, fruit-flavoured soft taffy manufactured by the Wrigley Company, which is a subsidiary of Mars, Inc. Starburst has many different varieties, such as Tropical, Sour, FaveREDs, Watermelon, Very Berry, Superfruit, Summer Blast and Original.

Introduced in the United Kingdom in 1959, the regular flavours are lemon and lime, orange, cherry, and strawberry.

== History ==
The brand was introduced by Mars in the (UK) United Kingdom in the autumn of 1959, named Opal Fruits by Peter Phillips (known as Peter Pfeffer at the time), the winner of a competition that won him £5. Produced at their factory in Slough, Berkshire, the four original flavours were strawberry, lemon, orange and lime. Opal Fruits were introduced in the United States in 1967 as M&M's Fruit Chewies. By 1968, they were renamed Starburst under the suggestion of Mars food scientist Aaron L. Brody, who noted M&M's connotation to chocolate. Brody's team originally wanted to use fruit on the packaging but this was rejected as real fruit was not used. While the etymology of the name Starburst is not certain, it was probably an attempt to express the burst of flavour at each bite, and draw attention while space interest was at its peak during the Space Race. Originally, Starburst came in the same flavours as Opal Fruits, though the lime flavour was replaced by cherry in the US in the early 1980s. Subsequently, its first variant, "Sunshine Flavors", was released, and was later renamed "Tropical Opal Fruits". In Europe, the lemon and lime flavours were combined to become a singular "lemon and lime" flavour to make room for a blackcurrant flavour for Opal Fruits.

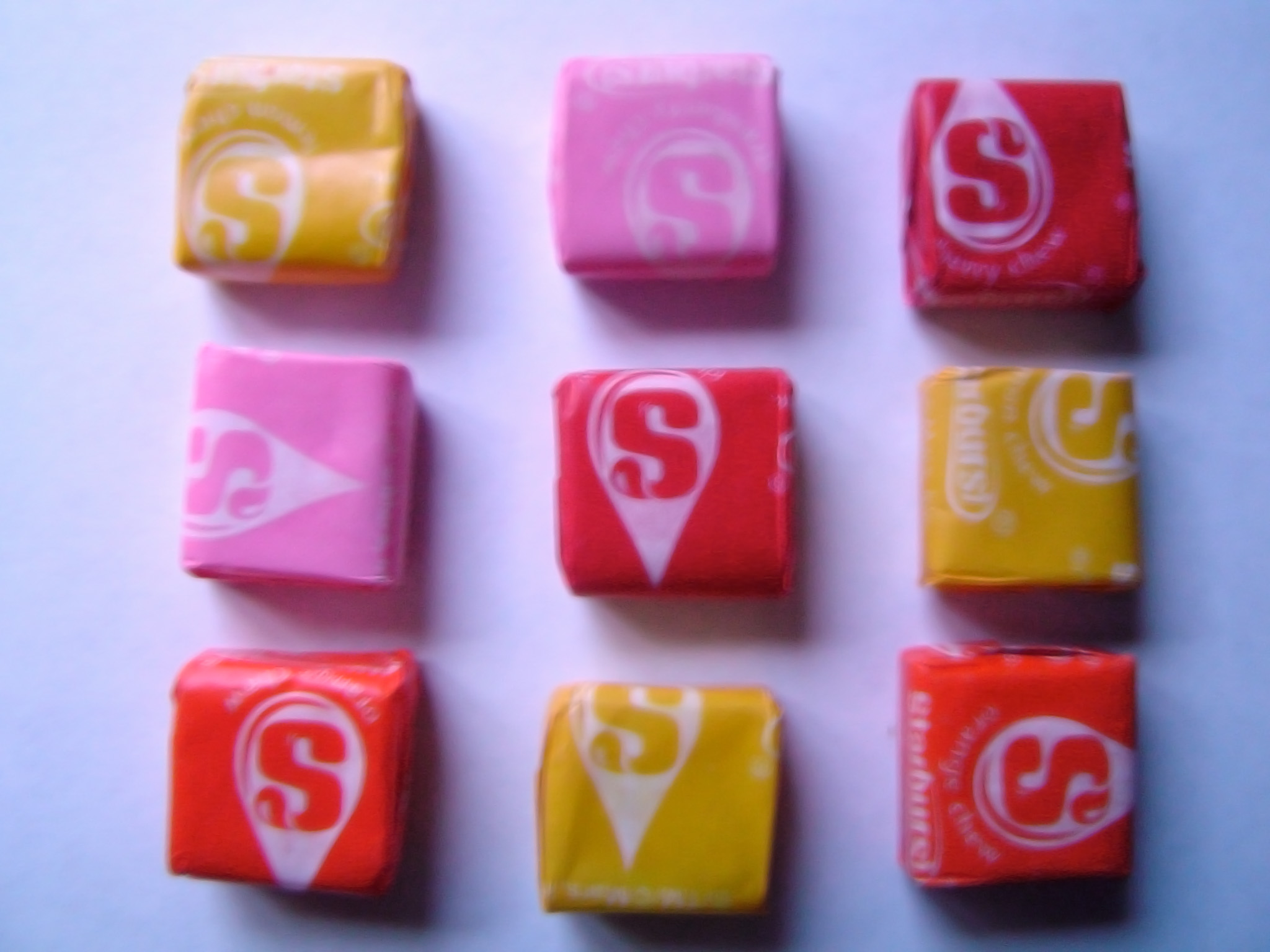
in-package Starburst Flavors

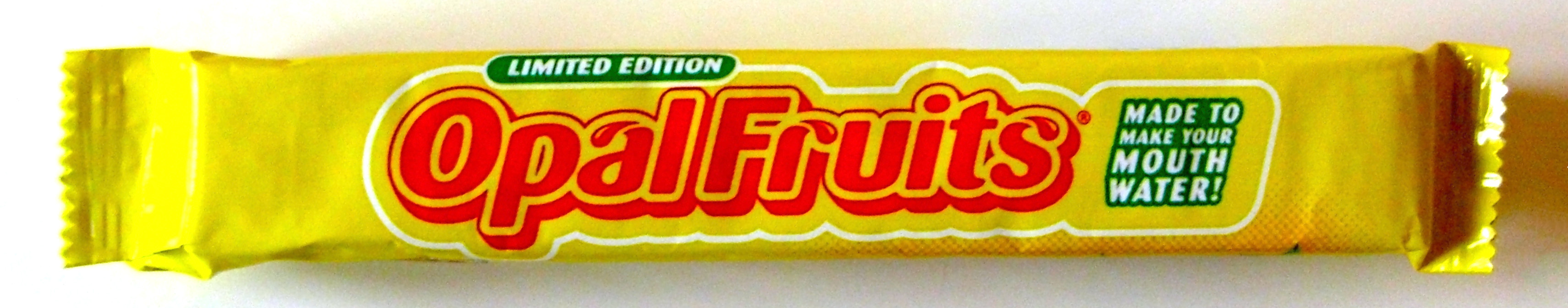
The UK 'Twenty-one Fruits' limited edition original Opal Fruits branding

The brand name Opal Fruits was phased out in the United Kingdom, followed by Ireland in 1998 in order to standardise the product in a globalised marketplace. In 2008, however, Mars revived the original Opal Fruits candy in the UK (United Kingdom) in conjunction with the supermarket chain Asda for a period of 12 weeks starting on 10 May 2008. On 7 October 2008, Mars acquired Wrigley and it transferred Mars' non-chocolate candy brands, including Starburst, to the Wrigley subsidiary. The original flavours are now branded "Original Fruits", and Starburst now comes in several assortments: FaveREDs, Limited Edition Retro Fruits, Tropical, Baja California, Sour, Strawberry Mix, Berries and Creme, Very Berry and Fruity Slushies. Among the additional flavours are Strawberry Lemonade, Strawberry-Banana, Blue Raspberry, Blue Raspberry Rush, Cherry Splash, Citrus Slush, Kiwi, Banana, Plum, Passion Fruit, Mango, Blueberry, Blackberry, Raspberry, Melon, Watermelon, Tropical Punch, Green Apple, Orange Cream, Mixed Berries and Cream, Peaches and Cream and Strawberry and Cream. Europe and the United States also has the "Sour" assortment, which includes Apple, Cherry, Pineapple and Raspberry, as well as Strawberry Mix.

Starburst in the UK is vegetarian, its packaging and website clearly stating "Suitable for Vegetarians", and also does not contain any artificial colours or flavours. In the US, Starburst contains non-vegan gelatin in its ingredients.

Lime Starburst made a comeback in 2007 as a limited-edition "retro" flavour in packages of the "Baja" version, while the range in the UK was further extended with a version named Starburst Choozers. These lozenge shaped chews have a liquid fruit juice centre, and come packaged with the tag line "The chews that ooze." Each packet contains three flavours; Orange & Mango, Raspberry & Orange and Pineapple & Orange.

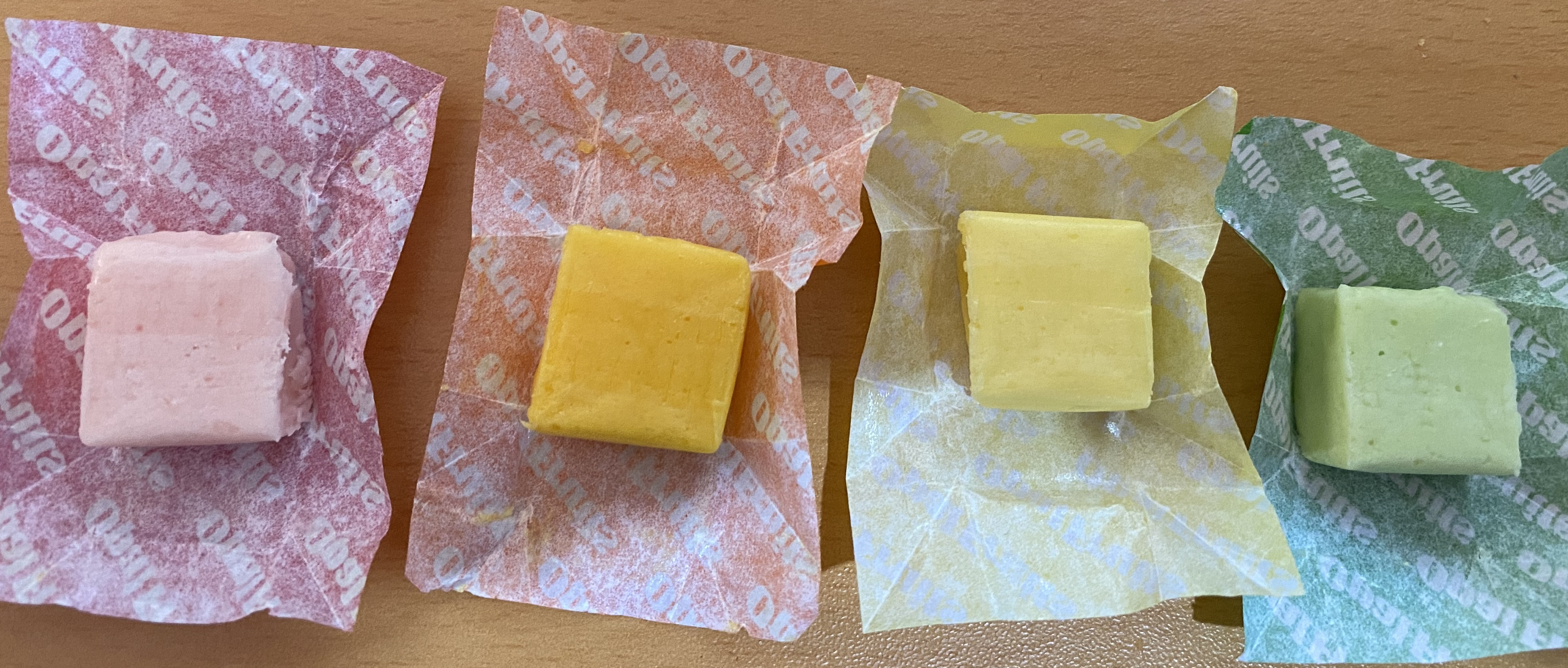
Unwrapped original Opal Fruits (strawberry, orange, lemon and lime from left to right) brought back in 2021 as a limited edition

As of August 2016, the advertising slogan for Starburst is "Unexplainably Juicy".

During March 2020, the Opal Fruits name was revived again for a limited period in the UK with a 152g bag available in Poundland and Dealz stores initially, which included the four original flavours (lemon, strawberry, orange, lime).

Starburst products were entirely discontinued in New Zealand in April 2021, and in Australia in June 2022. Starburst-branded products had been sold in Australia since 1996.

As of November 2022, the Duos and Tropical flavours have been discontinued by Mars Inc.

In March 2023, Democratic California Assemblyman Jesse Gabriel introduced the California Food Safety Act to the California Assembly which intended to ban production, sales, and consumption of all foods and drinks (including Starburst, Skittles, Pez, Sour Patch Kids, Campbell Soup, etc.) that contain titanium dioxide and 4 other harmful additives (propylparaben, red dye 3, brominated vegetable oil, and potassium bromate) across the state. All five of additives had been linked to causing cancer and other health problems and at least three were already banned by the European Union from being used in food and drink products. If passed, California will become the first US state to adopt the European Union's ban on titanium dioxide and other cancer-causing chemical additives from being used in food and drink products. Although the legislation was signed into law in October 2023, a last-minute amendment removed titanium dioxide from the banned ingredients.

== Marketing ==
In the 1970s, Opal Fruits were well known in the UK for their advertising tag line "Opal Fruits—made to make your mouth water!" (slogan coined by Murray Walker). The full advertising jingle was "Opal Fruits—made to make your mouth water/Fresh with the tang of citrus/four refreshing fruit flavours/orange, lemon, strawberry, lime/Opal Fruits—made to make your mouth water!"

Starburst has been marketed in several ways, including a marketing tie-in for the movie Pirates of the Caribbean: Dead Man's Chest where they replaced Kiwi Banana and Tropical Punch with Royal Berry Punch.

In 2002, Starburst created a song for the Australian market called "Get Your Juices Going". It was released as a CD single and attributed to a fictional pop group also called Starburst.

In 2007, a commercial for Starburst's Berries and Creme flavour went viral. The commercial, referred to as "Berries and Creme" or as "The Little Lad Dance", stars a man dressed in Victorian/Georgian clothing expressing his excitement for the candy's flavour by performing an impromptu song and dance routine. The commercial received praise for its style from Advertising Age. In an interview with Adweek, the actor of the character (Jack Ferver) commented that the commercial took over 12 hours to film and that they had to wear the full costume in 80 °F (27 °C) weather.

In the second half of 2021, the Berries and Creme commercial went viral for a second time, with a number of videos on TikTok using the audio and the "Little Lad Dance".

== Other varieties ==
Starburst also exists or has existed in the form of vines "fruit twists", ropes, candy corn, popsicles, gum, candy canes, jelly beans, fruit roll ups, gelatin, energy drinks (in partnership with C4 Energy), lip gloss (in a partnership with Lip Smackers) Sparkling Ice drinks and yogurt (by Yoplait in 2019 as a flavour). Until 2021, the company also produced 'heart-shaped' jelly beans for Valentine's Day. In 2021, Starburst released their first vegan gummy candy in the US.

A range of non-taffy Starburst products for the Australian and New Zealand markets were produced from 1997 to 2020; products included "Snakes" gummies and "Sucks" lollipops.
