= Brooks Gray =

Canadian writer, actor and producer

Brooks Gray is a Canadian writer, actor and producer.

Gray co-wrote, produced and starred in Cock'd Gunns, a rockumentary comedy series about "the worst band you've never heard of." Cock'd Gunns aired on IFC in Canada.

He has appeared in Scare Tactics, The Morgan Waters Show and Filth City as well as The Amazing Gayl Pile, a comedy series set at a fictional home shopping channel in Hamilton, Ontario. Gray writes, directs and stars (as Reverend Dave) in the show, which airs on NBC's streaming service Seeso.

Gray was nominated for three Gemini Awards for Cock'd Gunns, winning Best Ensemble Performance in a Comedy Program or Series and Best Writing in a Comedy or Variety Program or Series. Gray was nominated for a Canadian Screen Award for The Amazing Gayl Pile, Best Original Program or Series produced for Digital Media - Fiction.

== Filmography ==
Year	Title	Role	Notes
2006	The Morgan Waters Show	Chef Otis Oliphant	Also the writer
2017	Filth City	Gerry Popadick	
2014–2020	The Amazing Gayl Pile	Rev. Dave White	Also the writer
