= List of Happily Divorced episodes =

Happily Divorced is an American sitcom created for TV Land by Fran Drescher and Peter Marc Jacobson, based upon their own real-life experiences. It is TV Land's third sitcom after Hot in Cleveland and Retired at 35. Fran Drescher stars as Fran, a Los Angeles florist who finds out her husband Peter (John Michael Higgins), to whom she has been married for eighteen years, is gay. Naturally, they get a divorce but, because of their tight financial situation, they continue to live in the same house together. The series is based on Drescher and Jacobson's real-life divorce and his eventual coming out. The series ran from June 15, 2011 to February 13, 2013. On August 23, 2013, TV Land cancelled the series after two seasons. A total of thirty-four episodes were produced and aired.

== Series overview ==
| Season | Episodes | Originally released | |
| Season | Episodes | First released | Last released |
|---|---|---|---|
| 1 | 10 | June 15, 2011 | August 17, 2011 |
| 2 | 24 | March 7, 2012 | February 13, 2013 |

== Episodes ==
=== Season 1 (2011) ===
| No. overall | No. in season | Title | Directed by | Written by | Original release date | Prod. code | U.S. viewers (millions) |
|---|---|---|---|---|---|---|---|
| 1 | 1 | "Pilot" | Lee Shallat Chemel | Fran Drescher & Peter Marc Jacobson | June 15, 2011 | 101 | 2.41 |
Fran (Fran Drescher) is mortified when, after 18 years of marriage, her husband Peter (John Michael Higgins) comes out as gay. Fran files for divorce but because their house is worth less than what they owe on it, they continue to live together. After the divorce is final, Fran meets a new guy, Elliott (D. W. Moffett). They go out but Elliott ends up being rushed to the hospital after a severe allergic reaction to truffles. Fran later introduces him to Peter and her parents.
| 2 | 2 | "Pillow Talk" | Lee Shallat Chemel | Story by : Fran Drescher & Peter Marc Jacobson and Frank Lombardi; Teleplay by : Caryn Lucas | June 22, 2011 | 102 | 1.50 |
Fran and Elliot are looking forward to a romantic evening while Peter and Judi go out to a bar. The drunken Peter comes home and lays down into his bed, next to the sleeping Fran and Elliot. The next morning is embarrassing and Elliot breaks up as he feels that Fran and her ex-husband are still too close to each other. Fran and Peter fight and set up a new arrangement with boundaries, respecting each other's privacy. Later on, they go to Judi's concert in a gay bar. Peter is flirting with a man, but Fran barges in and ruins the encounter to get even with Peter.
| 3 | 3 | "Anniversary" | Lee Shallat Chemel | Story by : Fran Drescher & Peter Marc Jacobson and Frank Lombardi; Teleplay by : Robert Sternin & Prudence Fraser | June 29, 2011 | 103 | 1.76 |
Fran and Peter, as singles, now must pay more taxes than ever, so they're happy to have a big order of $10,000 for a wedding. But when the young couple arrives at Fran's flower shop, Fran sees that the groom is gay like Peter and warns the wife-to-be. The bride cancels the wedding, hence the honest Fran loses the order. They have to sell Fran's engagement ring. Peter wants to thank her for this sacrifice with a dinner on their anniversary, but Fran doesn't like this idea and Peter gets to know why Fran lost her order and gets angry. They fight, she then plans a date for the evening, but she changes her mind, cancels the date and they go out and celebrate their anniversary.
| 4 | 4 | "A Date With Destiny" | Lee Shallat Chamel | Story by : Fran Drescher & Peter Marc Jacobson and Frank Lombardi; Teleplay by : Frank Lombardi | July 6, 2011 | 104 | 1.82 |
Fran and Judy find high-school love letters, so Fran begins dating her high-school crush, Richard. Meanwhile, Peter and Richard bond, it turns out Richard is prejudiced, so Fran dumps him. (Note: Fran mentions that she made out with someone in an AMC Gremlin car.)
| 5 | 5 | "Spousal Support" | David Trainer | Story by : Fran Drescher & Peter Marc Jacobson and Frank Lombardi; Teleplay by : Mike Dow & Devon Kelly | July 13, 2011 | 105 | 1.56 |
Fran joins a support group when she’s bothered by an older, wealthy client’s doting on Peter and realizes that some wounds from the divorce are still fresh.
| 6 | 6 | "I Wanna Be Alone" | Lee Shallat Chemel | Story by : Fran Drescher & Peter Marc Jacobson and Frank Lombardi; Teleplay by : Caryn Lucas | July 20, 2011 | 106 | 1.72 |
Fran wins a cruise for two and decides to go alone, which angers both Peter and Judi. Meanwhile, Dori brings out her thespian side when she joins a local theater group.
| 7 | 7 | "Someone Wants Me" | Lee Shallat Chemel | Story by : Fran Drescher & Peter Marc Jacobson and Frank Lombardi; Teleplay by : Sean Presant | July 27, 2011 | 107 | 1.39 |
Fran tries online dating in a failed attempt to forget Elliot.
| 8 | 8 | "A Kiss Is Just a Kiss" | Lee Shallat Chemel | Story by : Fran Drescher & Peter Marc Jacobson and Frank Lombardi; Teleplay by : Mike Down & Devon Kelly | August 3, 2011 | 108 | 1.63 |
Fran and Judi have their first fight over a guy they met named David (Lou Diamond Phillips) and special guest stars Renée Taylor and Robert Gant makes appearances.
| 9 | 9 | "Vegas Baby" | Lee Shallat Chamel | Story by : Fran Drescher & Peter Marc Jacobson and Frank Lombardi; Teleplay by : Frank Lombardi | August 10, 2011 | 110 | 1.49 |
After traveling to Las Vegas for a florist convention, Fran and Peter sleep together. Fran thinks that she might be pregnant.
| 10 | 10 | "Torn Between Two Lovetts" | Lee Shallat Chemel | Story by : Fran Drescher & Peter Marc Jacobson and Frank Lombardi; Teleplay by : Nastaran Dibai & Jeffrey B. Hodes | August 17, 2011 | 109 | 1.64 |
Fran and Peter are attracted to the same guy. Charles Shaughnessy guest stars.

=== Season 2 (2012–13) ===
| No. overall | No. in season | Title | Directed by | Written by | Original release date | Prod. code | U.S. viewers (millions) |
|---|---|---|---|---|---|---|---|
| 11 | 1 | "The Reunion" | Steve Zuckerman | Jayne Hamil | March 7, 2012 | 204 | 1.44 |
Fran, not wanting to appear as single at her college reunion and before her college nemesis Jill (Morgan Fairchild), asks Elliot to be her pretend fiance for a night.
| 12 | 2 | "Peter Comes Out, Again" | Peter Marc Jacobson | Story by : Fran Drescher & Jay Kogen; Teleplay by : Jay Kogen | March 14, 2012 | 201 | 1.03 |
Peter's brother, Matthew, is in town for a visit. Fran forces Peter to come out to his brother. Meanwhile, Matthew confesses to Fran that she was the old flame of his youth and now asks her out. Peter reacts jealously.
| 13 | 3 | "Daddy's Girl" | Steve Zuckerman | Story by : Fran Drescher & Caryn Lucas; Teleplay by : Caryn Lucas | March 21, 2012 | 203 | 1.25 |
Fran becomes worried about her father's mental health. Meanwhile, Glen buys a motorcycle, which frightens Fran. She decides to steal it with Peter in order to save Glen. But neither of them has ever motorcycled.
| 14 | 4 | "The Burial Plotz" | Peter Marc Jacobson | Story by : Fran Drescher & Frank Lombardi; Teleplay by : Frank Lombardi | March 28, 2012 | 202 | 1.35 |
When the roof at Frantastic Flowers begins to leak, Fran decides to sell Peter's spot in the family burial plot to pay for it to Marilyn (Renée Taylor) for her alive but very old mother Mrs. Kapelmaster (Ann Guilbert). Dori and Peter are very upset, so Fran tries to buy it back.
| 15 | 5 | "Swimmers and Losers" | Bob Koherr | Story by : Fran Drescher & Bob Myer; Teleplay by : Bob Myer | April 11, 2012 | 205 | 1.05 |
When Fran learns that a same-aged friend is already a grandmother, she realizes that she has buried the chapter on kids a long time ago and starts to doubt it. At the same time, Peter wants to serve as a sperm donor for a colleague, much to the indignation of Fran.
| 16 | 6 | "Newman vs. Newman" | Bob Koherr | Story by : Fran Drescher & Diane Wilk; Teleplay by : Diane Wilk | April 18, 2012 | 206 | 0.88 |
Dori gets in contact with her old flame of her youth on Facebook. Dori and Glen argue and Dori moves in with Fran. Fran's attempt to reconcile them backfires, so Fran asks Dori's friend Marilyn for advice.
| 17 | 7 | "Adventure Man" | Lee Shallat Chemel | Story by : Fran Drescher & Devon Kelly; Teleplay by : Mike Dow & Devon Kelly | April 25, 2012 | 208 | 1.11 |
Fran begins a romance with a commercial fisherman and outdoorsman (John Schneider), but Peter is skeptical of their compatibility. It appears Peter may be right when Fran and her beau take a weekend camping trip.
| 18 | 8 | "Time in a Bottle" | Lee Shallat Chemel | Story by : Fran Drescher & Jay Kogen; Teleplay by : Jay Kogen | May 2, 2012 | 209 | 0.84 |
Everybody's at Fran's and they all gather to watch Judi's commercial. When Fran raises the question of what made Peter come out two years ago, everybody tells their memories, but Fran then realizes some things are better left in the past.
| 19 | 9 | "Mother's Day" | Lee Shallat Chemel | Story by : Fran Drescher & Caryn Lucas; Teleplay by : Caryn Lucas | May 9, 2012 | 210 | 0.98 |
Fran forgets to make Mother's Day brunch reservations, so she spends a day shopping with her mom to make up for it. But on that day they don't get along well, pretty much as Fran and her dog Esther. So she asks an old high school friend, Katy (Rosie O'Donnell), who is a dog psychologist, for advice.
| 20 | 10 | "Fran-alyze This" | Lee Shallat Chemel | Story by : Fran Drescher & Bob Myer; Teleplay by : Bob Myer | May 16, 2012 | 211 | 0.94 |
Peter sets up Fran for a date with a psychologist (Dan Aykroyd), which just pushes her back to Elliot. Elliot asks Fran to join him at therapy to work on his commitment issues, but the therapist (who turns out to be Fran's failed date) is more interested in helping Fran figure out why she pursues unavailable men like Elliot.
| 21 | 11 | "Cesar's Wife" | Lee Shallat Chemel | Story by : Fran Drescher & Frank Lombardi; Teleplay by : Frank Lombardi | May 30, 2012 | 212 | 0.99 |
When it appears that Cesar is having problems with his wife, Teresa (Judy Reyes), Peter advises Fran to stay out of it. But Fran can't stop herself from butting in.
| 22 | 12 | "Two Guys, a Girl and a Pizza Place (Part 1)" | Lee Shallat Chemel | Story by : Fran Drescher & Mike Dow; Teleplay by : Chad Drew | June 6, 2012 | 207 | 1.40 |
Fran meets an adorable New Yorker named Frankie (Ralph Macchio), who is opening a pizza parlor in LA. Just as Fran and Frankie start to get romantic, Elliot pops back into Fran's life and says he is finally ready to commit.
| 23 | 13 | "Two Guys, a Girl and a Pizza Place (Part 2)" | Rob Schiller | Story by : Fran Drescher & Diane Wilk; Teleplay by : Diane Wilk | November 28, 2012 | 213 | 1.28 |
Elliot confronts Fran at the hospital where Peter is being treated. Fran says she can no longer tolerate Elliot's commitment issues, and chooses to stay with Frankie. This greatly pleases Peter, who also adores Frankie. Despite Frankie's constant romancing of Fran, the two haven't made love after nearly a month of being together. When they finally do end up in bed, Fran realizes the spark she had with Elliot doesn't exist with Frankie. Peter begrudgingly approaches Elliot for the sake of keeping Fran happy, and Elliot proposes to Fran.
| 24 | 14 | "Meet the Parents" | Rob Schiller | Story by : Fran Drescher & Caryn Lucas; Teleplay by : Caryn Lucas | December 5, 2012 | 214 | 1.19 |
When Elliot's parents (Robert Wagner and Florence Henderson) come to town, Fran throws them a dinner party. But her efforts to impress them go awry when Elliot's mom realizes her ring has disappeared. Meanwhile, Elliot's dad keeps hitting on Dori.
| 25 | 15 | "The Back-Up Fran" | Rob Schiller | Story by : Fran Drescher & Frank Lombardi; Teleplay by : Frank Lombardi | December 12, 2012 | 215 | 1.01 |
Fran is worried about how Peter will get along when she moves out with Elliot, so she proposes that he look for a new roommate. But when Peter brings home the potential roommate, Jan (Debi Mazar), it appears things won't change very much.
| 26 | 16 | "A Star Is Reborn" | Joe Regalbuto | Story by : Fran Drescher & Diane Wilk; Teleplay by : Diane Wilk | December 19, 2012 | 217 | 0.94 |
When Peter's opportunity to sell a $2 million home conflicts with his second job as Joan Collins' personal assistant, Fran steps in to work for Ms. Collins for a day, with predictably disastrous results. Meanwhile, Glenn is hoping Fran can help him meet Joan in person.
| 27 | 17 | "Follow the Leader" | Joe Regalbuto | Story by : Fran Drescher & Devon Kelly; Teleplay by : Chad Drew | December 26, 2012 | 218 | 1.12 |
Marilyn's never-married daughter and Fran's childhood friend, Kiki (Cyndi Lauper), comes to town with news that she's engaged to Richie, a man who owns 12 local appliance stores. But after hearing Fran talk about the passion she has with Elliot, Kiki decides to follow her heart and hooks up with an old flame in town named Carmine, who is a lowly waiter. An enraged Marilyn blames Fran.
| 28 | 18 | "Love Thy Neighbor" | Joe Regalbuto | Story by : Fran Drescher & Mike Dow; Teleplay by : Mike Dow & Devon Kelly | January 2, 2013 | 216 | 1.00 |
With Elliot still away on business, Fran's frustration reaches a peak when her new neighbor Neil (Harry Van Gorkum) throws constant, noisy parties. The situation only gets worse when Neil brings unwelcome news about the Frantastic Flowers shop.
| 29 | 19 | "The Biggest Chill" | Skip Collector | Story by : Fran Drescher & Yvette Lee Bowser; Teleplay by : Yvette Lee Bowser | January 9, 2013 | 219 | 1.03 |
When Judi's old college boyfriend Tony (Keenen Ivory Wayans) arrives in town and wants to rekindle their relationship, Fran encourages Judi to go for it. But Judi's initial skepticism may be justified when Tony doesn't show up for their first date.
| 30 | 20 | "Peter's Boyfriend" | Victor Nelli, Jr. | John Kazlauskas | January 16, 2013 | 220 | 0.90 |
When Fran and Judi go to a movie, they run into Peter and his new boyfriend, Chris (Colin Ferguson), whom Fran did not know about. When Peter explains why he wanted to keep his life with Fran hidden from Chris, his fears become a reality. Complicating matters is the fact that Chris still lives with his ex-husband.
| 31 | 21 | "I Object!" | Victor Nelli, Jr. | Story by : Fran Drescher & Devon Kelly; Teleplay by : Mike Dow & Devon Kelly | January 23, 2013 | 221 | 1.11 |
Peter has been tasked with planning Fran's and Elliot's wedding. His sister Peggy (Molly Shannon), who voiced an objection during Peter's and Fran's ceremony 20 years ago, makes a surprise visit, and Fran still hasn't forgiven her. Things only get worse when Peggy offers to "help" Peter with his planning.
| 32 | 22 | "Happily Divorced... With Children" | D. W. Moffett | Story by : Fran Drescher & Frank Lombardi; Teleplay by : Frank Lombardi | January 30, 2013 | 222 | 1.13 |
Fran and Peter discover that parenting may not have been all that easy, when they are asked to watch both Cesar's son and Neil's daughter.
| 33 | 23 | "Sleeping with the Enemy" | Ellen Gittelsohn | Story by : Fran Drescher & Yvette Lee Bowser; Teleplay by : Yvette Lee Bowser | February 6, 2013 | 223 | 1.06 |
After Fran saves Neil from choking, she and Peter try to guilt him into forgiving their $40,000 debt for the lein on the flower shop. Fran then starts having recurring sex dreams about Neil.
| 34 | 24 | "For Better or For Worse" | Peter Marc Jacobson | Story by : Fran Drescher & Caryn Lucas; Teleplay by : Caryn Lucas | February 13, 2013 | 224 | 1.06 |
After a shocking kiss from neighbor Neil, Fran decides she must fly to London right away and surprise Elliot. But she's the one who's in for a surprise when she gets there. She is about to accept Elliot's suspicious explanation, when Joan Collins sets her straight.
