= Jake Choi =

American actor (born 1985)

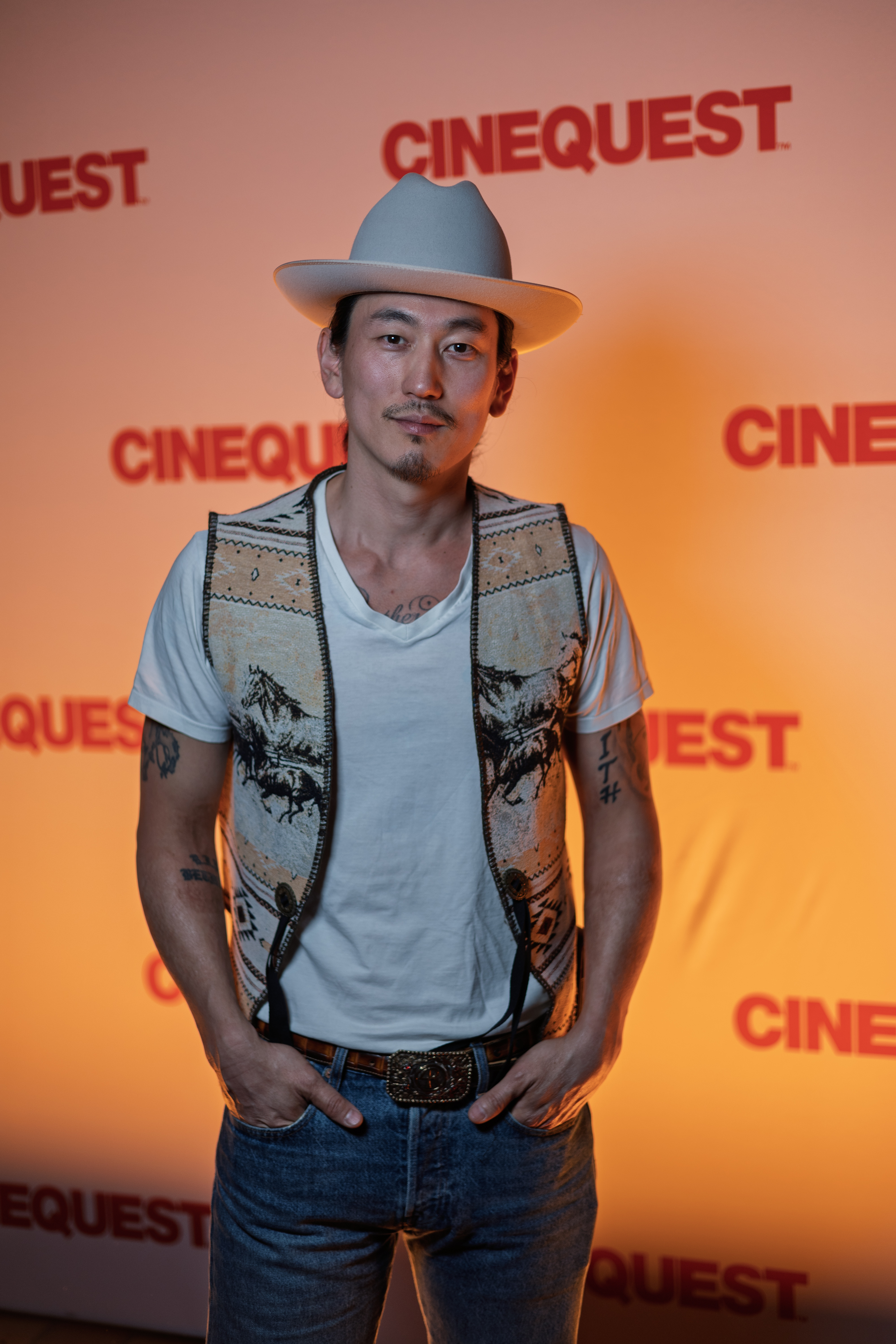
- Jake Choi at the Cinequest Film Festival in 2026
- Born: January 14, 1985 (age 41); Queens, New York City, U.S.
- Education: Yonsei University
- Occupation: Actor
- Years active: 2010–present
- Known for: Front Cover, Single Parents

Jake Choi (born January 14, 1985) is an American actor. He is best known for his role as Miggy on the ABC comedy Single Parents. He previously starred in Front Cover, an LGBTQ independent film. Choi has also appeared in Younger, EastSiders, and The Sun Is Also a Star.

== Early life and education ==
Choi was born January 14, 1985, and raised in Elmhurst, Queens, New York. He is Korean-American. He was raised by his mother, and came from "working-class immigrant roots." During high school he played in the AAU. He graduated from Newtown High School in 2004, where he played on the school varsity basketball team.

After graduating, he moved to South Korea to play basketball at Yonsei University, and subsequently played in the Korean Basketball League. He returned to the States and pursued acting, taking classes at the Lee Strasberg Institute.

== Career ==
In 2015, Choi played his first lead role as Ryan in the independent film Front Cover, a romantic comedy featuring two East Asian male leads. Choi's performance received positive critical reviews. According to Sheri Linden at The Hollywood Reporter: "Chen's career-driven Ning defies easy labels, but ultimately the movie is about Ryan's transformation, one that Choi deftly conveys."

Choi has appeared in guest roles on several television shows since 2015, including Broad City, Younger, and Hawaii 5-0. He played a recurring role on HBO's Succession in 2018.

Choi gained wider prominence after he was cast as a series regular on the fall 2018 ABC show Single Parents in the role of Miggy, a 20-year-old single dad. The show was cancelled in May 2020 after two seasons.

As of January 2019, he has a recurring role on EastSiders, a Netflix dark comedy. The same year, he played Charles Bae, brother of Charles Melton's Daniel Bae, in the film adaptation of the YA novel The Sun Is Also a Star.

== Personal life ==
In 2018, Choi came out as sexually fluid.

== Filmography ==
=== Film ===
Year	Title	Role	Director	Notes
2010	Closed	Takeout Man	Alex Shin, Christopher Zou	Short film
2011	The Last Farewell	Jerry	Girard Tecson	Short film
2011	P-Word Pizza		Yelena Sabel	Short film
2011	Psycho-Path	Luke	Geraldine Winters	
2011	Home	Restaurant Boss	Seimi Kim	Short film
2012	The Contained	Victim	Ryan Kramer	Short film
2012	The Learning Curve	Lenny	Scott Eriksson	Short film
2012	The Friend	Mark Cobain	Chris Bo Wen	Short film
2013	Walkie Buddies	Mike	Martin Rosete	Short film
2013	Benchmark	T	Vincent Lin	Short film
2013	Welcome Home	Liam	Patrick Chen	Short film
2013	Hypebeasts	Danny	Jess Dela Merced	Short film
2015	Front Cover	Ryan	Ray Yeung	Nominated – Golden Koala Award for Best Actor
2016	Wolves	Gil	Bart Freundlich	
2016	Money Monster	Korean News Anchor	Jodie Foster	
2016	A Bear Lands on Earth	Dave	Hiroo Takaoka, Rob Yang	
2016	Meet Ugly	Andrew	Yasmine Gomez	Short film
2019	Ms. Purple	Johnny	Justin Chon	
2019	The Sun Is Also a Star	Charles Bae	Ry Russo-Young	
2020	Keep Home Alive	Colton	Laura Murphy	
2020	Definition Please	Richie	Sujata Day	
2021	Lust Life Love	Daniel	Benjamin Feuer, Stephanie Sellars	
2022	Please Baby Please	Lon	Amanda Kramer	
2022	R.I.P.D. 2: Rise of the Damned	Slim	Paul Leyden	
2023	World's Best	Mr. Oh	Roshan Sethi	
2023	The Mattachine Family	Jamie	Andy Vallentine	
2025	Idiotka	Jung-soo	Nastasya Popov	

=== Television ===
Year	Title	Role	Notes
2011	Mysteries at the Museum	MIT Student	Episode: "Annabelle Doll, Bridge Collapse, Whale Attack"
2011–2012	CollegeHumor Originals	Person 4/Son Rearden	2 episodes
2012	Jest Originals	Jeremy Lin	Episode: "Jeremy Lin Picked Last in Pickup Game"
2012	School Spirits	Daniel Hooven	Episode: "Frat House Phantom"
2012	Steel Wulf: Cyber Ninja	Sniper	6 episodes
2013	Golden Boy	Gunman	Episode: "Pilot"
2013	Unforgettable	Waiter/Uncover Agent	Episode: "Day of the Jackie"
2014	Law & Order: Special Victims Unit	Ty Lee	Episode: "Gridiron Soldier"
2014	Gotham	Gunman #2	Episode: "Arkham"
2015	Broad City	James	Episode: "Mochalatta Chills"
2015	Younger	Roman	3 episodes
2016	The Mysteries of Laura	Calvin Wu	Episode: "The Mystery of the End of Watch"
2016	Difficult People	Restaurant Host	Episode: "36 Candles"
2016	Lethal Weapon	Richie Kim	Episode: "Fashion Police"
2016	Next Big Thing	Beau	TV movie
2017	Hawaii Five-0	Lee Sung	Episode: "Ka 'Aelike"
2017	Criminal Minds: Beyond Borders	The Booker	Episode: "Pretty Like Me"
2018	F*ck Yes	N/A	Episode: "Toys"
2018	Succession	Tatsuya	2 episodes
2018–2020	Single Parents	Miggy Park	Main role
2018	Untitled Gamer Comedy Show	Beau Chang	Episode: "Pilot: Clan War"
2019	EastSiders	Clifford	4 episodes
2020	The Magicians	Shinjiro	Episode: "The Wrath of the Time Bees"
2021	American Housewife	J.D.	Recurring role, 5 episodes
2021	In Treatment	Notary	Episode: "Eladio - Week 3"
2021	American Horror Stories	Stan	Episode: "Ba'al"

=== Music Video Appearances ===
Year	Title	Artist	Reference
2016	Good	Loco, Gray Ft. ELO	
