= Marc Swanson =

Brooklyn based artist

Marc Swanson (born in New Britain, Connecticut, United States) is an artist based in Brooklyn.

== Life and work ==
Marc Swanson received his MFA from the Milton Avery Graduate School of the Arts at Bard College, Annandale-on-Hudson, New York, in 2004, and also studied at the Skowhegan School of Painting and Sculpture, in Skowhegan, Maine, in 2000.

He is a contemporary American artist whose notably hand-made work is brings together formal preoccupations and references to personal history and identity conflict. He works in a variety of media, including sculpture, drawing, video, photography, and complex installations. As art critic David Velasco notes, "Swanson is an automythologist, one who excels in crafting sparkling, enigmatic totems from the messiness of his own history; there kitsch and confession dovetail to reveal, not obscure, visceral thirsts." His work was the subject of a one-person exhibition at the Herbert F. Johnson Museum of Art, at Cornell University, in 2008, and the accompanying catalogue was published in 2009, with an essay by Bill Arning. His work has been included in group exhibitions at P.S. 1 Contemporary Art Center, New York; the Whitney Museum of American Art, New York; the Miami Art Museum; and the Saatchi Gallery, London.

Marc Swanson grew up the son of a former Marine and avid hunter in small-town New England. He then moved to San Francisco in the early 1990s, and became involved in the city's gay counterculture and club scene. He did not feel totally at home in either place, and he began making crystal-covered deer head sculptures as a way to explore, both physically and spiritually, the duality of masculine identities he was experiencing.

In addition to the series of rhinestone-based sculptures, which he continues to explore, the artist's sculptural work employs a variety of materials, including light, wood, glass, fabric, gold and silver chain, mirror, and naturally-shed animal antlers.

Killing Moon #3 is Swanson's self-portrait, where he depicts himself as a Yeti in his lair in the boiler room of P.S. 1. “The idea was that I would be the Yeti and basically collect garbage for four-to-six weeks every night to make the installation. I had to reconcile the fact that I’m an educated artist who knows about formal issues and academia, and figure out what the Yeti would make instead—these more ritualistic objects. But the Yeti also collects things in the world and then puts them together to sort of make sense of the world around him. It dawned on me that I pretty much do the same thing: so I’m the yeti and the yeti is me.”

Of his one-person exhibition at Richard Gray Gallery, Chicago, in April/May 2009, Robyn Farrell Roulo writes, "Although influenced by Robert Rauschenberg and Joseph Cornell, Swanson’s approach is all his own. He wittingly reveals aspects of his psyche with each piece, stating that his work is conceptually, materially and formally driven. The subjects and materials used in the show run the gamut, but all are connected by theme. Reflections of his conservative upbringing in New England and current lifestyle are central to his inspiration. Swanson is a hunter and gatherer of media and identity."

In December 2009 it was revealed that Marc Swanson was selected for the 2009 Norton Family Christmas Project commission. Artists to have been awarded this commission in previous years include Kara Walker, Jim Hodges, Vik Muniz, Christian Marclay, Takashi Murakami, Yinka Shonibare, and Lawrence Weiner, among others.

Marc Swanson is represented by Richard Gray Gallery and Inman Gallery in Houston, TX.

== Selected works ==
- Fits and Starts (2005)
