= Happily Divorced =

American sitcom (2011–2013)

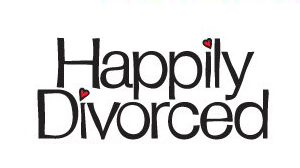
- Genre: Comedy
- Created by: Fran Drescher; Peter Marc Jacobson
- Starring: Fran Drescher; John Michael Higgins; Tichina Arnold; Valente Rodriguez; Robert Walden; Rita Moreno
- Composers: Gavin Lurssen; Ran Pink
- Country of origin: United States
- Original language: English
- No. of seasons: 2
- No. of episodes: 34 (list of episodes)

Production
- Executive producers: Fran Drescher; Keith Cox; Larry W. Jones; Peter Marc Jacobson
- Camera setup: Multi-camera
- Running time: 22 minutes
- Production companies: Uh-Oh Productions; TV Land Original Productions

Original release
- Network: TV Land
- Release: June 15, 2011 – February 13, 2013

Happily Divorced is an American sitcom created by Fran Drescher and Peter Marc Jacobson. Inspired by their own experiences as a formerly married couple, the series, which became TV Land's third original scripted series following Hot in Cleveland and Retired at 35, ran from June 15, 2011, to February 13, 2013, and revolves around a Los Angeles florist who finds out her husband of 18 years is gay. IT was canceled after two seasons on August 23, 2013.

== Premise ==
Drescher plays Fran Lovett, a Los Angeles florist who is shocked when Peter, her husband of 18 years, comes out of the closet as gay. They divorce, but because of the poor economy, they cannot afford to live separately. She struggles with navigating the new parameters of their relationship while re-entering the dating pool.

== Cast and characters ==
=== Main ===
- Fran Drescher as Fran Lovett (née Newman), an L.A. florist
- John Michael Higgins as Peter Lovett, a real estate agent and Fran's gay ex-husband
- Tichina Arnold as Judi Mann, Fran's best friend
- Valente Rodriguez as Cesar, Fran's Mexican-American flower shop employee
- Robert Walden as Glenn Newman, Fran's father
- Rita Moreno as Dori Newman, Fran's mother

=== Recurring ===
- D. W. Moffett as Elliot, Fran's first love after divorcing Peter, later an on-off relationship interest, and Fran's ex-fiancée
- Renée Taylor as Marilyn Kappelmaster, Dori's neighbor and frenemy
- Harry Van Gorkum as Neil, Fran's new neighbor who is at first an adversary, but later complicates her relationship with Elliot
- Joan Collins as herself, Peter's boss when he takes a second job as her personal assistant
- Colin Ferguson as Chris, Peter's boyfriend

=== Special guest stars ===
- Lou Diamond Phillips as David
- Jennifer Holliday as herself
- Peter Marc Jacobson as himself
- Charles Shaughnessy as Gregory Sherwood
- Morgan Fairchild as Jill
- Ann Morgan Guilbert as Myrna
- John Schneider as Adam
- Rosie O'Donnell as Katie
- Dan Aykroyd as Harold
- Ralph Macchio as Frankie
- Robert Wagner as Douglas
- Florence Henderson as Elizabeth
- Thierre Di Castro Garrito as Ramon
- Debi Mazar as Jan
- Cyndi Lauper as Kiki
- Keenen Ivory Wayans as Tony
- Molly Shannon as Peggy

== Episodes ==
Season	Episodes	Originally released	
Season	Episodes	First released	Last released
1	10	June 15, 2011	August 17, 2011
2	24	March 7, 2012	February 13, 2013

== Development and production ==
Happily Divorced cast during the first season.

Happily Divorced is inspired by the real lives of series creators Fran Drescher and Peter Marc Jacobson, who had been high school sweethearts and then married in 1978. They divorced in 1999. Jacobson later came out as gay to Drescher and the two remained friends. In 2010 the pair, who had previously created Drescher's earlier series The Nanny, began developing the series based on their life experiences. Initially Drescher planned only to write and produce Happily Divorced but eventually decided to star as well. Set in Los Angeles, Fran's gay ex-husband still lives with her for economic reasons, with "a very traditional family. Everyone's very accepting that he's gay. They're both dating; he's new at it, she's new at it." TV Land gave the green light to a pilot episode in November 2010. The network announced on March 21, 2011, that the series had been picked up with a ten-episode order. The show is shot in front of a live studio audience at CBS Radford in Studio City., which provides Happily Divorced the typical style of the 1990s' sitcoms. There are still more parallels to The Nanny: the opener is an animation, underlaid with specially composed music and also, Drescher refuses a role name and is just called 'Fran'. The Nanny regulars, Renée Taylor and Charles Shaughnessy, have made guest appearances; the latter having also co-starred on Living with Fran. The show premiered on Wednesday, June 15, 2011, in the 10:30 time slot after the television show Hot in Cleveland.

The show was renewed on July 20, 2011, for a second season of 12 episodes, which started airing weekly on March 7, 2012. The new season is advertised by the slogan "The Laugh is Back". Beginning of February 2012 TV Land made the guest stars for season 2 public. There are again some famous The Nanny faces : Renée Taylor (alias Sylvia Fine) returns from season 1 as Dori's neighbor "Marilyn", and Ann Guilbert (alias Yetta) appears as Marilyn's mother, "Mrs. Kapelmaster". Furthermore, Hollywood beauties Morgan Fairchild and Joan Collins will be on view as well.

On April 29, 2012, the day of the TV Land Awards 2012, the cable broadcaster extended the second season, picking up an additional 12 episodes, bringing the total count of season 2 to 24 episodes. The initial 12 episode order concluded June 6. The 12 additional episodes began airing November 28, 2012, at 10:30 PM EST, following the Season 4 premiere of Hot in Cleveland at 10 PM.

The show was officially cancelled on August 23, 2013.

=== Ratings ===
Season	Timeslot (ET/PT)	Episodes	First aired		Last aired		TV Season	Viewers (in millions)
Season	Timeslot (ET/PT)	Episodes	Date	Viewers (millions)	Date	Viewers (millions)	TV Season	Viewers (in millions)
1	Wednesday 10:30 pm	10	June 15, 2011	2.41	August 17, 2011	1.64	2011	1.69
2	Wednesday 10:30 pm	24	March 7, 2012	1.44	February 13, 2013	1.06	2012–13	1.09

== Critical reception ==
Early reviews of the series were mixed. David Hinckley, writing for The New York Daily News, noted that it "may be that all this will develop an interesting story. On opening night, though, it feels like the show's primary goal is to set up one-liners – which is not how the great shows got to be great." Brian Lowry of Variety called it "so painfully broad and filled with gay stereotypes all but Drescher's most faithful fans will yearn to be separated from their TVs," while Matthew Gilbert of The Boston Globe summed it as "the kind of throwback you just might want to throw back." Mark A. Perigard's review for The Boston Herald was very emphatic; he noted that "in Happily Divorced, TV Land, the cable channel for baby boomers, finally may have found the perfect companion to its smash Hot in Cleveland."

== Home media ==
Paramount Home Media Distribution released the first season of Happily Divorced on Region 1 DVD on March 6, 2012.

DVD name	Region 1 Release Date	Region 2 Release Date	Region 4 Release Date	Ep #	Discs	Additional information
1	March 6, 2012	TBA	TBA	10	2	Cast Interviews, a "Cancer Schmancer" PSA.

== Broadcast ==
Endemol has sold Happily Divorced into multiple territories. The show has been bought by SBS in the Netherlands, SABC in South Africa, Global in Canada, Comedy Central in India, Italy, Mexico and Brazil, MTV in Latin America and TV 2 in New Zealand. Similar deals with a German company for Happily Divorced will be announced soon. In Bulgaria the show has been bought by Fox Life. Advanced negotiations are underway in Poland and Sweden. In Greece, the sitcom premiered on October 15, 2012, at the prime-time slot of Makedonia TV. In Belgium the show premiered April 8, 2013, and airs daily on VIJF after reruns of The Nanny at 6.30pm. In the United Kingdom, the series made its debut on May 12, 2013, on TLC UK. In 2020, 7plus started streaming Happily Divorced in Australia.
