= Fits and Starts =

Sculpture by Marc Swanson

Fits and Starts is a sculpture by the Brooklyn, New York City artist Marc Swanson, the 2005 vandalism of which at DePauw University created controversy.

Fits and Starts was a life-size sculpture of a deer in mid-leap that was entirely encrusted in rhinestone crystals. It was made of steel and polyurethane foam. The sculpture was installed near DePauw's East College building on 4 November 2005. The artwork combined the influence of his politically conservative father, an Eagle Scout and US Marine, and Swanson's identity as a gay male. The Butler Family Foundation, which "is committed to supporting the acquisition of contemporary sculpture created by emerging artists of promise and established artists of note," paid US$60 000 to donate the sculpture to DePauw.

== Vandalism ==
In 2005, students at DePauw University hit the sculpture with various objects and sawed off parts of the deer's antlers. After the vandalism, the artwork was removed and stored in the basement of the Peeler Art Center at the University. In the fall of 2008, restoration of the sculpture was completed, and the deer now stands on the second story of the art center.
