= Hunting Season (web series) =

- Season 1 logo
- Created by: Jon Marcus
- Written by: Jon Marcus; Adam Baran
- Directed by: Jon Marcus
- Starring: Ben Baur; Pressly Coker; Jack Ferver; Tyler French; Walker Hare; Jake Manabat; Marc Sinoway
- Theme music composer: Jake Monaco
- Country of origin: United States
- Original language: English
- No. of seasons: 2
- No. of episodes: 12

Production
- Executive producers: Jon Marcus; Rose Troche
- Running time: 9–12 minutes (season 1); 21-30 minutes (season 2)

Original release
- Network: HuntingSeason.tv; LOGOtv.com; Vimeo
- Release: September 12, 2012 – May 5, 2015

Hunting Season is an American LGBT-themed comedy-drama web series created by Jon Marcus. Following the romantic and sexual exploits of Alex (Ben Baur) and his small group of friends in New York City, the story was inspired by and largely based on the 2005–08 blog The Great Cock Hunt and the 2008 novel of the same name published by Kensington Books.

Season 1 premiered in September 2012 with eight short-format webisodes. Season 2, funded by a 2013 Kickstarter crowdfunding campaign that raised $151,406, premiered in May 2015 and consisted of four longer episodes. The series's theme music was composed by Jake Monaco.

== Premise ==
Hunting Season follows Alex, a single, gay, 20-something blogger for Gawker in Manhattan who begins writing anonymously about his wild social life.

== Characters ==
- Ben Baur as Alex
- Marc Sinoway as Tommy
- Jake Manabat as TJ
- Tyler French as Reese
- Brit-Charde Sellers as Shania
- Pressly Coker as Hot Sales Guy
- Joshua Warr as Harris

=== Season 1 ===
- Walker Hare as Lenny
- Jack Ferver as Nick
- Kate Geller as Lizzie
- David Lavine as Ben

=== Season 2 ===
- Quinn Jackson as Jamie
- Yuval Boim as Will
- Ken Barnett as Josh King
- Hunter Hoffman as Reagan
- Nic Cory as Aron
- David Garelik as Nico
- Ryan Barry as Luke

== Episodes ==
=== Season 1 (2012) ===
No. overall	No. in season	Title	Original release date	Length
1	1	"Episode 1"	September 12, 2012	9:40
2	2	"Episode 2"	September 12, 2012	11:20
3	3	"Episode 3"	September 12, 2012	11:54
4	4	"Episode 4"	September 19, 2012	11:22
5	5	"Episode 5"	September 26, 2012	10:35
6	6	"Episode 6"	October 3, 2012	9:06
7	7	"Episode 7"	October 10, 2012	10:18
8	8	"Episode 8"	October 17, 2012	11:51

=== Season 2 (2015) ===
No. overall	No. in season	Title	Original release date	Length
9	1	"Episode 201"	May 5, 2015	21:05
10	2	"Episode 202"	May 5, 2015	27:56
11	3	"Episode 203"	May 5, 2015	24:28
12	4	"Episode 204"	May 5, 2015	29:30

== Development and production ==
Creator Jon Marcus was inspired to produce his own web series after watching The Guild (2007–2013) and later Web Therapy (2008–2014). He said in 2012:

Show after show in development at American networks is a remake of something that was on the air first in another country ... Has the industry completely lost confidence in its own ability to come up with new ideas? The world of the Web was exciting to me. It reminded me of the ‘90s, when I started my career in indie film; when you could see filmmakers like Todd Haynes, Eddie Burns, Spike Lee, and Ang Lee telling unique stories with characters who hadn’t been given screen time before; and when there was a reliable audience who would show up to financially support them. I think the time is right now for audiences to be able to do that through the Web, and to support an entertainment economy that takes risks and tells original stories.

The story is inspired by and largely based on the 2005–08 blog The Great Cock Hunt and the 2008 novel of the same name published by Kensington Books. A fan of the blog as it was being published, Marcus told Next Magazine in 2012, "My friends all passed it around. It was really hot, it was really fun and it reminded us all of being in New York, which I had been in my 20s and it was just addictive." During the period of the blog's run, three cable TV networks directed at LGBT viewers had been launched: Q, Here! and Logo. Noting the popularity of the racy gay drama series Queer as Folk (2000–05) on Showtime, Marcus thought one of these networks would be interested in a show about single gay men in New York. He contacted the anonymous writer of the blog and optioned it for development as a series. Marcus said in a 2012 AfterElton interview:

I loved the characters. I loved Alex’s voice. I thought he was as smutty, but he was also really funny and really smart. I thought that there was something about the way that he was so unabashed and shameless about his sex life. An unrepentant slut. A lot of people that I know are like that, and certainly I had a phase like this. We all went through this period in our twenties of, you know, being quite taken with the complete availability of hot single gay men in New York. But I think that there’s real shame that accompanies that period for a lot of people. People don’t like to talk about it, and here was Alex writing gleefully about all the sex he was having. A lot more sex than I had, certainly, but I really identified with him and sort of felt great about the fact that he could just reach out and celebrate it and make it okay. Alex just flings open a second closet door that I think a lot of gay men have about being sexually active.

Marcus shelved the idea for a few years when he found that "no one in the business wanted to make the show I wanted to make". He revisited the project in 2010 as he noticed the increased popularity and accessibility of online programming. Marcus enlisted Adam Baran, and the two began adapting the blog into scripts, while also fleshing out certain characters and expanding the concept to both appeal to a wider audience and to avoid stereotypes.

Hunting Season is set and filmed in New York City. Marcus financed the first season himself with "very, very little money", and a 2013 Kickstarter crowdfunding campaign to finance season 2 of the series raised $151,406.

== Broadcast ==
The first three episodes of Hunting Season were released online on Wednesday, September 12, 2012. Five more episodes followed, one released every subsequent Wednesday until October 17, 2012. An uncensored edition of the series, containing nudity, was available for paid download at HuntingSeason.tv, while a censored edition was freely available LOGOtv.com. In August 2013, the uncensored version of season 1 became available for paid download from Vimeo On Demand, with the censored version free for viewing at HuntingSeason.tv.

Season 2 premiered on Vimeo on May 5, 2015.

Season 1 consists of eight short-format webisodes of between 9 and 12 minutes in duration, and the four episodes of season 2 are between 21 and 30 minutes long.

== Reception ==
Emily Rome of Entertainment Weekly called the series a "gay Sex and the City", and noted its "full-frontal nudity". Next Magazine called Hunting Season "sexy" and "racy", noting that "the series has also gained attention for its large amount of nude scenes". In January 2016, Out named Alex as one of its "30 Most Eligible Gay TV Characters", after previously naming Baur to its Out100 list in 2015.

=== Awards and nominations ===
Year	Award	Category	Nominee(s)	Result	Ref.
2012	4th Indie Soap Awards	Best Actor — Comedy	Ben Baur as Alex	Nominated	
2012	4th Indie Soap Awards	Best Ensemble — Comedy		Nominated	
2012	4th Indie Soap Awards	Best Soundtrack		Won	
2012	LA Webfest Awards	Outstanding Composer (Dramedy)	Jake Monaco	Won	
2012	LA Webfest Awards	Outstanding Producer (Dramedy)	Jon Marcus	Won	
2012	LA Webfest Awards	Outstanding Sound Design (Dramedy)	Roman Chimienti	Won	
2016	7th Indie Series Awards	Best Web Series — Comedy		Nominated	
2016	7th Indie Series Awards	Best Writing — Comedy	Jon Marcus	Nominated	
2016	7th Indie Series Awards	Best Lead Actor — Comedy	Ben Baur as Alex	Nominated	
2016	7th Indie Series Awards	Best Ensemble — Comedy		Won	
2016	7th Indie Series Awards	Best Soundtrack	Grant Pavolka	Nominated	
2016	7th Indie Series Awards	Best Sound Design	Roman Chimienti and Jay Pellizzi	Nominated	
