= James Chen (actor) =

American actor

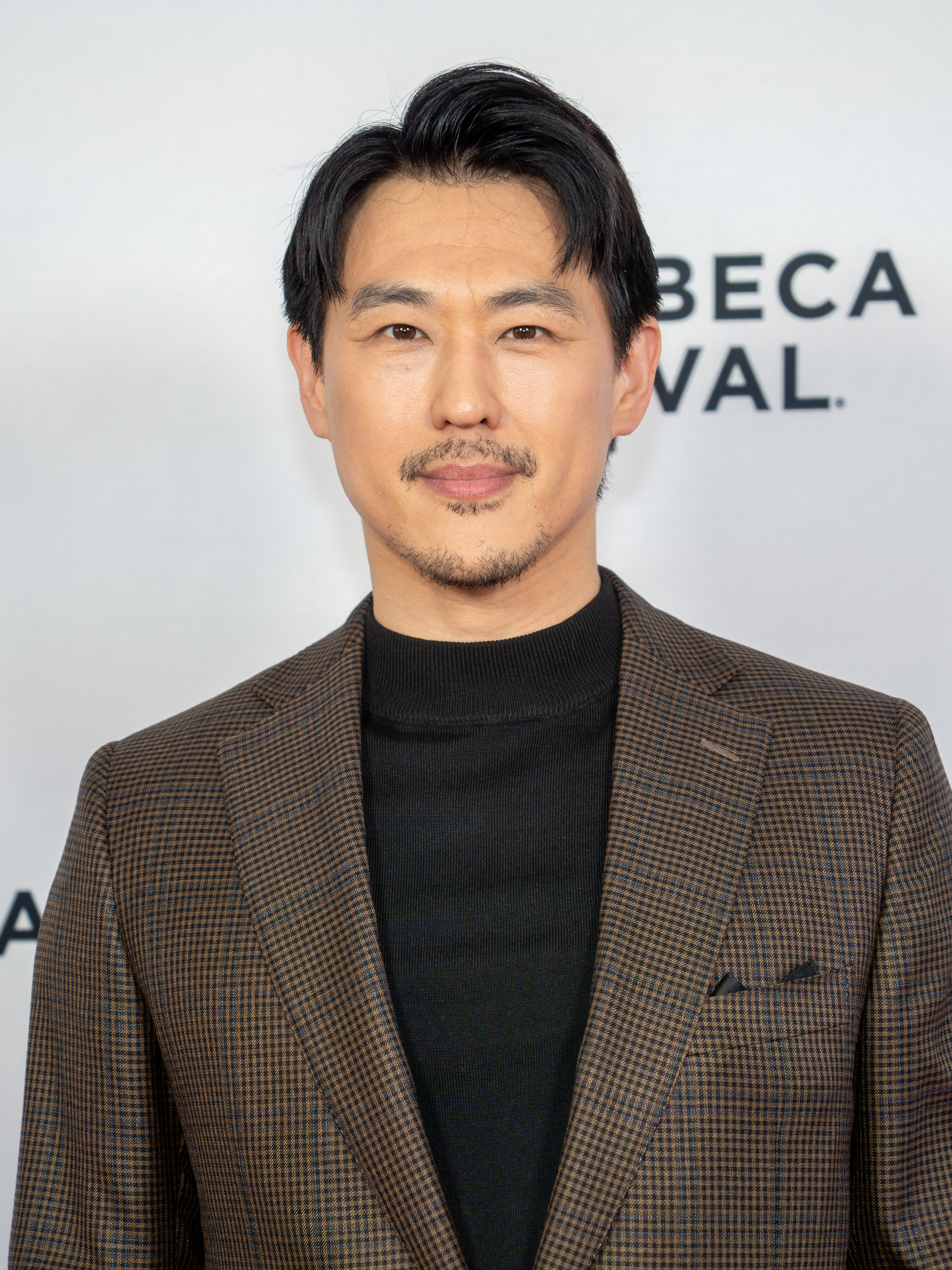
- Chen in 2025
- Born: New York, U.S.
- Education: University of Pennsylvania (BA); Yale University (MFA)
- Occupation: Actor
- Years active: 2004–present

James Chen (Chinese: 陳清仁) is an American actor. He is best known for portraying Kal on The Walking Dead. Chen also played Samuel Chung on the Netflix series Iron Fist.

== Early life and education ==
Chen was born and raised in New York and is of Chinese descent. After earning a Bachelor of Arts from the University of Pennsylvania, Chen earned a Master of Fine Arts from the Yale School of Drama. He was awarded with the Dexter Wood Luke Memorial Prize for his work there.

== Career ==
In 2011, he played the recurring character Adrian Sung in the crime series Law & Order: Special Victims Unit. He appeared in The Walking Dead, playing Kal in the shows' sixth through ninth seasons.

In 2015, he co-starred in the LGBT drama Front Cover opposite Jake Choi.

Since 2018 he plays Ian Lim, an FBI Analyst in the CBS drama FBI.

== Filmography ==
=== Film ===
Year	Title	Role	Notes
2004	Murder Below the Line	Pete Richards	
2010	Boy Wonder	Roy	
2010	Five Minarets in New York	Agent Lee	
2011	We Need to Talk About Kevin	Dr. Foulkes	
2011	Mr. Popper's Penguins	Fish and Game Officer	
2012	Watching TV with the Red Chinese	Tzu	
2012	Archaeology of a Woman	Desk Officer	
2012	The Amazing Spider-Man	Police Officer	
2013	Run Into You	Brady	Short film
2013	Labor Day	Paramedic	
2014	Before I Disappear	Chinese Man	Uncredited
2014	Amira & Sam	Donnie	
2015	Front Cover	Ning	
2018	Unintended	Danny	
2019	Fluidity	Eric	
2025	Rosemead	Dr. Hsu	

=== Television ===
Year	Title	Role	Notes
2009	Evan and Gareth Are Trying to Get Laid	Larry	TV movie
2009	Mercy	Ben Shin	1 episode
2010	Blue Bloods	Nelson Chiu	1 episode
2010	Running Wilde	Pathologist	1 episode
2011	Law & Order: Special Victims Unit	CSU Adrian Sung	Recurring (7 episodes)
2012	NCIS: Los Angeles	Cadeo Hoang	1 episode
2014	The Blacklist	Lee Chung	1 episode
2015	Sleepy Hollow	Lorenzo Chang	1 episode
2016	Person of Interest	James Ko	1 episode
2016–2019	The Walking Dead	Kal	Recurring
2017	Elementary	Lt. Morrison	1 episode
2018	Iron Fist	Samuel Chung	4 episodes
2018	Madam Secretary	Mr. Usuki	1 episode
2018–present	FBI	Ian Lim	Recurring
2019, 2024	9-1-1	Kevin Lee	2 episodes
2026	CIA	Ian Lim	
