= 4th Indie Soap Awards =

- Date: February 19, 2013
- Site: New World Stages, New York City

The 4th Annual Indie Soap Awards (ISA4) took place on February 19, 2013, once again at New World Stages in New York. The nonprofit Indie Series Network served as the charity sponsor. Colleen Zenk and Kevin Spirtas, who both landed on web series after attending ISA3, opened the show. Two former ISA winners, Martha Byrne and Hillary B. Smith, closed the show as the theater once again was filled with bubbles. The ceremony was live-streamed for the first time ever.

== Awards ==
Winners are listed first and highlighted in boldface:

**Best Web Series (Drama)**: **Out with Dad**; DeVanity; Hitman 101; Hustling; The Outs; Ragged Isle	**Best Web Series (Comedy)**: **The Bloody Mary Show**; Drama Queenz; Fumbling Thru the Pieces; Husbands; Pretty; Wrecked
**Best Directing (Drama)**: **Ragged Isle - Barry Dodd**; Thurston - Paul Awad; The Outs - Adam Goldman; Out with Dad - Jason Leaver; Miss Behave - Scott McKinsey; Hitman 101 - Scott Staven	**Best Directing (Comedy)**: **Wrecked - Liz Ellis**; Casters - Erin Gould; Cynthia Watros Gets Lost - Ben Fritz; Husbands - Jeff Greenstein; The Bloody Mary Show - Victoria Howell; I Hate Being Single - T.J. Misny
**Best Actor (Drama)**: **Sebastian La Cause, Hustling**; Anthony Anderson, Anacostia; Hunter Canning, The Outs; Michael Caruso, DeVanity; Georgie Daburas, Hitman 101; Sam Martin, Cost of Capital	**Best Actor (Comedy)**: **Brad Bell, Husbands**; Ben Baur, Hunting Season; Sean Hemeon, Husbands; Dane Joseph, Drama Queenz; Rob Michael Hugel, I Hate Being Single; Ed Robinson, Pairings
**Best Actress (Drama)**: **Miriam Pultro, Mythos**; Jillian Clare, Miss Behave; Signy Coleman, River Ridge; Kate Conway, Out with Dad; Kayla Olson, Once You Leave; Jessica Press, Hustling	**Best Actress (Comedy)**: **Cynthia Watros, Cynthia Watros Gets Lost**; Stacy McQueen, Pretty; Miriam Pultro, Casters; Bhama Roget, Wrecked; Hillary B. Smith, Fumbling Thru the Pieces; Hollie Taylor, The Bloody Mary Show
**Best Supporting Actor (Drama)**: **Adam Henry Garcia, Mythos**; Ian Carlsen, Ragged Isle; Kelvin Cook, Anacostia; Tommy Heleringer, The Outs; Corey Lof, Out with Dad; Michael Teh, Breaking Point	**Best Supporting Actor (Comedy)**: **Robert Bergin, Wrecked**; Michael Taylor Gray, Pretty; Richie Hart, The Bloody Mary Show; Robert Maffia, Fumbling Thru the Pieces; Ronnie Marmo, Adults Only; Joss Whedon, Husbands
**Best Supporting Actress (Drama)**: **Pasha Diallo, Anacostia**; Katie Caprio, DeVanity; Lauren B. Martin, Empire; Kate Revelle, Milgram and the Fastwalkers; Daphne Rubin-Vega, Hustling; Cotton Wright, Intersection	**Best Supporting Actress (Comedy)**: **Dee Freeman, Pretty**; Brianna Brown, Adults Only; Diane Delano, Fumbling Thru the Pieces; Marina Laduda, The National; Yvonne Perry, Super Knocked Up; Kirsten Vangsness, Pretty
**Best Ensemble (Drama)**: **Hustling**; Anacostia; DeVanity; Hitman 101; Miss Behave; The Outs	**Best Ensemble (Comedy)**: **The Bloody Mary Show**; Drama Queenz; Fumbling Thru the Pieces; Hunting Season; Husbands; Pretty
**Best Guest Appearance (Drama)**: **Terri Garber, Miss Behave**; Martha Byrne, Anacostia; Will Conlon, Clutch; Wendy Argelia Martínez, Hitman 101; Robin Riker, DeVanity; Sheilynn Wactor, Breaking Point	**Best Guest Appearance (Comedy)**: **Michele Lee, Fumbling Thru the Pieces**; Anthony Anderson, Pretty; Sebastian Bach, Adults Only; Jackie Beat, Where the Bears Are; Jon Cryer, Husbands; Tuc Watkins, Where the Bears Are
**Best Writing (Drama)**: **DeVanity - Michael Caruso**; Anacostia - Anthony Anderson; Hustling - Sebastian La Cause; Out with Dad - Jason Leaver; The Outs - Adam Goldman & Sasha Winters, Ragged Isle - Greg Tulonen, Rick Dalton, Karen L. Dodd, Barry Dodd & Jacob Lear	**Best Writing (Comedy)**: **Husbands - Brad Bell & Jane Espenson**; Wrecked - Liz Ellis & Gabriel A. Carbajal; I Hate Being Single - Rob Michael Hugel; Pretty - Steve Silverman; Fumbling Thru the Pieces - Julie A. Smith; Ruby Skye Pi - Julie Strassman-Cohn & Jill Golick
**Best Breakout Performance (All shows)**: **Caitlynne Medrek, Out with Dad**; Marion A. Akpan, Anacostia; Stephen Brookins, The National; Garrett Brennan, Thurston; Brett DelBuono, Miss Behave; Tarjatta Rose, Love Atlanta Style	**Best Cinematography (All shows)**: **Thurston - Paul Awad**; DeVanity - Rodolphe Portier; I Hate Being Single - Adam Newport-Berra; Once You Leave - Nate Locklear; Out with Dad - Bruce William Harper & Jason Leaver; Pairings - Seth Johnson
**Best Soundtrack (All Shows)**: **Hunting Season**; Hustling; Miss Behave; Out with Dad; Ragged Isle; Under the Cherry Tree	**Best Original Score (All shows)**: **Cost of Capital - Rob Gokee**; The Bar - Sam Diaz; The Bloody Mary Show - Christopher Skipper; Drifter: Broken Road - Michael Brasier; Ruby Skye Pi - Studiocat, David Wall, Jamie Shields & Adam White; Where the Bears Are - David Maddux
**Best Editing (All Shows)**: **Once You Leave - Nate Locklear**; Husbands - Nathaniel Atcheson; Ragged Isle - Barry Dodd; Out with Dad - Jason Leaver; The Outs - Adam Goldman & Jay Gillespie; Ruby Skye Pi - Mike Reisacher	**Best Visual/Special Effects (All Shows)**: **Hitman 101 - Pranjal Verma**; The Bloody Mary Show - Luke Dyton; Ragged Isle - Eric Anderson & Derek Kimball; Drifter: Broken Road - Geoffrey Palmer & Matt Lathrom; Ruby Skye Pi - Mike Reisacher; Milgram and the Fastwalkers - Craig Herron
**Best Costume Design (All Shows)**: **Thurston - Kathryn O’Sullivan**; The Bloody Mary Show - Mollie Barr; Drifter: Broken Road - Ryan Piotrowski; In Transit - Nick Plummer; Literally Dysfunctional - Amber Shaw; Small Parts - Miguel Cardenas	**Best Makeup (All Shows)**: **The Bloody Mary Show - Jamey-Leigh Weber & Julia Coleman**; Breaking Point - Tina Soares & Nicole Evans; DeVanity- Liz Kan; Hitman 101 - Tzu-Jung Toby Lee; Pretty - James Freitas & Brenda Oen; Ruby Skye Pi - Jessica Panetta
**Best Opening Sequence (All Shows)**: **Gay Nerds**; Adults Only; DeVanity; I Hate Being Single; Pretty in Geek; Wrecked
