= 6th Indie Series Awards =

- Date: April 1, 1015
- Site: El Portal Theatre, North Hollywood, California
- Hosted by: Eric Martsolf
- Produced by: Roger Newcomb, Kevin Mulcahy Jr., Susan Bernhardt

Highlights
- Most awards: Acting Dead
- Most nominations: Thurston (11)

Television coverage
- Network: WebVee Guide

The 6th Indie Series Awards were held on April 1, 2015 at the El Portal Theater in Los Angeles, hosted by Eric Martsolf. Presented by We Love Soaps, the awards recognize independently produced, scripted entertainment created for the web.

== Awards ==
The nominations were announced in February 2015, and the awards were given on April 1, 2015. Winners are listed first and highlighted in boldface:

**Best Web Series (Drama)**: **L.A. Macabre**; DeVanity; Hustling; Pete Winning and the Pirates; Thurston; Whatever, Linda	**Best Web Series (Comedy)**: **Acting Dead**; The Amazing Gayl Pile; Capitol Hill; High Road; Jewvangelist; Wallflowers
**Best Directing (Drama)**: **Matt Eastman, Whatever, Linda**; Sebastian La Cause, Hustling; Alexander JL Theoharis, Job Hunters; Mike Donis, Jason Leaver and Navin Ramaswaran, Pete Winning and the Pirates; Barry Dodd, Ragged Isle; Paul Awad, Thurston	**Best Directing (Comedy)**: **Morgan Waters and Brooks Gray, The Amazing Gayl Pile**; Robin Geradts-Gill, Altruman; Aaron Fradkin, Burt Paxton; Justin Harwood, High Road; Shaun Wilson, Noirhouse; Andrew McIlroy and Troy Mundle, Single & Dating In Vancouver
**Best Lead Actor (Drama)**: **Sebastian La Cause, Hustling**; Anthony Anderson, Anacostia; Richard Cutting, Milgram and the Fastwalkers; Mike Donis, Pete Winning and the Pirates; Gianmarco Soresi, Small Miracles; Matt Wolf, We Are Angels	**Best Lead Actor (Comedy)**: **Ben McEwing, Altruman**; Brian Beacock, Acting Dead; Nick Burr, Matt & Dave Are So Depressed; Burt Grinstead, Burt Paxton; Mark Mitchinson, High Road; Morgan Waters, The Amazing Gayl Pile
**Best Lead Actress (Drama)**: **Sarah Brown, Beacon Hill**; Kate Conway, Out with Dad; Ashli Dowling, We Are Angels; Jen Lilley, Youthful Daze; Lilly Melgar, The Bay; Colleen Zenk, Thurston	**Best Lead Actress (Comedy)**: **Jackie Geary, Jon and Jen are Married**; Tiffany Berube, The Tiffany and Erin Show; Jillian Clare, Acting Dead; Becky Kramer, Jewvangelist; Mhairi Morrison, Feathers and Toast; Minae Noji, Love Midori
**Best Supporting Actor (Drama)**: **Judd Hirsch, Small Miracles**; Garrett Brennan, Thurston; Andrew Glaszek, Hustling; Eme Ikwuakor, We Are Angels; Gerald McCullouch, Hustling; Gordon Thomson, DeVanity	**Best Supporting Actor (Comedy)**: **Chris Galya, Acting Dead**; Sean Eden, High Road; Gibson Frazier, Wallflowers; Dominic Rains, Love Midori; Mike Rock, Jon and Jen are Married; Graham Shiels, Love Midori
**Best Supporting Actress (Drama)**: **Sharon Washington, Hustling**; Crystal Chappell, Beacon Hill; Caitlynne Medrek, Out with Dad; Elizabeth Olin, We Are Angels; Jessica Sonneborn, Red Sleep; Susannah Wells, Thurston	**Best Supporting Actress (Comedy)**: **Alexandra Paul, Mentor**; Debbie Gibson, Acting Dead; Alexandra Jordan, High Road; Susan Louise O'Connor, Wallflowers; Kim Strother, Down Dog; Janet Walmsley, Single & Dating in Vancouver
**Best Ensemble (Drama)**: **Anacostia**; The Dreamers; Hustling; L.A. Macabre; Producing Juliet; Thurston	**Best Ensemble (Comedy)**: **39 to Go**; Where the Bears Are; Uh, Hey Dude; Bad Lads; Single & Dating in Vancouver; Standard Action
**Best Guest Actor (Drama)**: **Richard Hatch, Pairings**; Richard Cutting, DeVanity; Aidan Gowland, Out with Dad; Rick Kain, Anacostia; Charles Shaughnessy, The Bay; Walt Willey, Thurston	**Best Guest Actor (Comedy)**: **Peter Allen Vogt, Acting Dead**; Robert Bogue, Wallflowers; Sean Cullen, The Casting Room; John Halbach, Wallflowers; Tuc Watkins, Where the Bears Are; Henry Zebrowski, The Return of Saturn
**Best Guest Actress (Drama)**: **Andrea Evans, DeVanity**; Martha Byrne, Anacostia; Patrika Darbo, The Bay; Mara Davi, Hustling; Lynne Koplitz, Gays; Alyssa Owsiany, Out with Dad	**Best Guest Actress (Comedy)**: **Megan Duffy, Dating Pains**; Lee Garlington, Mentor; Carolyn Hennesy, Acting Dead; Emma Koenig, HelLA; Fiona Vroom, Single & Dating in Vancouver; Sarah Whelan, The Ethical Slut
**Best Writing (Drama)**: **Moshe Mones, Small Miracles**; Michael Caruso, DeVanity; Sebastian La Cause, Hustling; Jason Leaver, Out with Dad; Tina Cesa Ward, Producing Juliet; Kathryn O'Sullivan and Paul Awad, Thurston	**Best Writing (Comedy)**: **Brian Beacock, Acting Dead**; Morgan Waters and Brooks Gray, The Amazing Gayl Pile; Justin Harwood, High Road; David Zarif, Matt & Dave Are So Depressed; Jason Stuart and Paul Elia, Mentor; Kieran Turner, Wallflowers
**Best Production Design (All Shows)**: **DeVanity - Michael Caruso and Barbara Caruso**; Acting Dead - Danny Cistone and Shannon Fitzgerald; Capitol Hill - Christopher Balder; Gays - Peter William Dunn; Small Miracles - Jesika Farkas; Thurston - Kathryn O'Sullivan and Paul Awad	**Best Cinematography (All shows)**: **Thurston - Paul Awad**; Capitol Hill - Vincent Pierce; DeVanity - Rodolphe Portier; Ragged Isle - Derek Kimball. David C. Miller and Barry Dodd; Still - Jonathan Holbrook; We Are Angels - Aaron Garcia
**Best Soundtrack (All Shows)**: **Wallflowers - Kieran Turner and Michael Turner**; Altruman - Robin Geradts-Gill; The Dreamers - Kelsey Jorissen; Gays - Peter William Dunn; People You Know - John Dylan DeLaTorre and Baltimore Russell; Ragged Isle - Barry Dodd	**Best Original Score (All shows)**: **Pete Winning and the Pirates - Aaron Tsang**; Asset - Adrian Ellis; Out with Dad - Adrian Ellis; Pairings - Rob Gokee; Ragged Isle - Richard DeCosta; Sweethearts of the Galaxy - Brian Donovan
**Best Editing (All Shows)**: **We Are Angels - Aaron Garcia**; Asset - Jonathan Robbins; Job Hunters - David Zimmermann; Out with Dad - Jason Leaver; Ragged Isle - Barry Dodd; Still - Jonathan Holbrook	**Best Visual/Special Effects (All Shows)**: **Milgram and the Fastwalkers - George Canzaniello**; Job Hunters - Cinesaurus; Ragged Isle - Richard DeCosta, Eric Anderson and Derek Kimball; Malice - Philip Cook; Standard Action - Rob Hunt; Vanessa's Story - Jason Leaver
**Best Costume Design (All Shows)**: **Capitol Hill - Harmony Arnold**; Chop Socky Boom - Cherelle Ashby and Jonelle Cornwell; LARPs: The Series - Samuel Gagnon-Tremblay; Small Miracles - Julie Saltman; Standard Action - Vanessa Driveness; Thurston - Kathryn O'Sullivan	**Best Makeup (All Shows)**: **Still - Kate Dixson**; Acting Dead - Jen Grable; Anacostia - Lora Lee; The Bay - Ren Bray; Capitol Hill - Erik Warren; DeVanity - Heather Borah
