= 42nd Daytime Creative Arts Emmy Awards =

- Awarded for: Outstanding achievement in all fields of daytime television
- Date: April 24, 2015
- Location: Hilton Universal City Hotel in Los Angeles, California, U.S.
- Presented by: National Academy of Television Arts and Sciences
- Hosted by: Alex Trebek; Florence Henderson

Highlights
- Most awards: The Bold and the Beautiful (8)
- Most nominations: General Hospital (28)
- Website: emmyonline.org

The 42nd Daytime Creative Arts Emmy Awards ceremony, which honors the crafts behind American daytime television programming, was held at the Hilton Universal City Hotel in Los Angeles on April 24, 2015. The event was presented in conjunction with the 42nd Daytime Emmy Awards by the National Academy of Television Arts and Sciences. The nominations were announced on March 31, 2015.

The ceremony was held with Jeopardy! icon Alex Trebek and The Brady Bunch actress Florence Henderson serving as the ceremony's hosts.

== Winners and nominees ==
In the lists below, the winner of the category is in bold.

=== Animated programs ===
Category	Winners and nominees
Outstanding Children's Animated Program	**All Hail King Julien (Netflix)**; Arthur (PBS); The Fairly OddParents (Nickelodeon); Sanjay and Craig (Nickelodeon)
Outstanding Special Class Animated Program	**Silent (YouTube)**; Phineas and Ferb – Episode: "Phineas and Ferb Save Summer" (Disney XD); Star Wars: The Clone Wars (Netflix)
Outstanding Pre-School Children's Animated Program	**Tumble Leaf (Amazon)**; Peg + Cat (PBS); VeggieTales in the House (Netflix)
Outstanding Performer in an Animated Program	**Danny Jacobs** as **King Julien** on **All Hail King Julien (Netflix)**; Christopher Lloyd as Hacker on Cyberchase (PBS); Dick Van Dyke as Captain Goof Beard on Mickey Mouse Clubhouse (Disney Junior); Megan Mullally as Miss Nettle on Sofia the First (Disney Junior); Mark Hamill as Darth Bane on Star Wars: The Clone Wars (Netflix)
Outstanding Directing in an Animated Program	**Silent (YouTube)**; All Hail King Julien (Netflix); Peter Rabbit (Nickelodeon); Star Wars: The Clone Wars (Netflix); Wild Kratts (PBS)
Outstanding Writing in an Animated Program	**Tom Martin, Grant Moran, Eric Ledgin, and Justin Shanes** for **WordGirl (PBS)**; George Arthur Bloom, Allan Neuwirth, and Adam Rudman for Cyberchase (PBS); Matt Davis, David Rosenberg and Richard Bazley for Lost Treasure Hunt (APT); Christian Taylor for Star Wars: The Clone Wars (Netflix)
Outstanding Writing in a Pre-School Animated Program	**Billy Lopez, Billy Aronson, Kevin Del Aguila, and Dustin Ferrer** for **Peg + Cat (PBS)**; Angela Santomero, Becky Friedman, Jennifer Hamburg, and Wendy Harris for Daniel Tiger's Neighborhood (PBS); Elisa Allen, Craig Bartlett, and Joe Purdy for Dinosaur Train (PBS); Chris Nee, Kerri Grant, and Kent Redeker for Doc McStuffins (Disney Junior)
Outstanding Casting for an Animated Series or Special	**Ania O'Hare** for **All Hail King Julien (Netflix)**; **Meredith Layne, Sarah Noonan, and Gene Vassilaros** for **Teenage Mutant Ninja Turtles (Nickelodeon)**; Abbie D'Andrea and Brian Mathias for Jake and the Never Land Pirates (Disney Junior); Meredith Layne, Sarah Noonan, and Gene Vassilaros for Sanjay and Craig (Nickelodeon); Shannon Reed, Sarah Noonan, and Gene Vassilaros for The Legend of Korra: Seasons 3-4 (Nickelodeon)
Outstanding Individual Achievement in Animation	**Michael Granberry** for lead animation in **Tumble Leaf (Amazon)**; **Drew Hodges** for character design in **Tumble Leaf (Amazon)**; **Marten Jonmark** for storyboard in **Peter Rabbit (Nickelodeon)**; **Jason Kolowski** for production design in **Tumble Leaf (Amazon)**; **Jairo Lizarazu** for background layout design in **Jake and the Never Land Pirates (Disney Junior)**; **Robyn Yannoukos** for color in **Tumble Leaf (Amazon)**
Outstanding Sound Editing – Animation	**Kung Fu Panda: Legends of Awesomeness (Nickelodeon)**; Silent (YouTube); Star Wars: The Clone Wars (Netflix)
Outstanding Sound Mixing – Animation	**Kung Fu Panda: Legends of Awesomeness (Nickelodeon)**; The Legend of Korra: Seasons 3-4 **(Nickelodeon)**; Silent (YouTube); Star Wars: The Clone Wars (Netflix); Teenage Mutant Ninja Turtles (Nickelodeon)

=== Children's Series ===
Category	Winners and nominees
Outstanding Pre-School Children's Series	**Dino Dan: Trek's Adventures (Nickelodeon)**; Sesame Street (PBS); Yo Gabba Gabba! (Nickelodeon)
Outstanding Children's Series	**R. L. Stine's The Haunting Hour: The Series (Discovery Family)**; Made in Hollywood: Teen Edition (Syndicated); Odd Squad (PBS); Spooksville (Discovery Family); The Wildlife Docs (Syndicated)
Outstanding Performer in a Children's Series	**Margot Kidder** as **Mrs. Worthington** on **R. L. Stine's The Haunting Hour: The Series (Discovery Family)**; Leslie Carrara-Rudolph as Abby Cadaby on Sesame Street (PBS); Jessica Honor Carleton as Lion, Chicken, Land Shark, and Chipmunk on Green Screen Adventures (MeTV); Mason Cook as Bo on R. L. Stine's The Haunting Hour: The Series (Discovery Family); Joey Mazzarino as Murray, Fiverine, and Only-One-Cannoli on Sesame Street (PBS)
Outstanding Directing in a Children's Series	**Odd Squad (PBS)**; Annedroids (Amazon); Dino Dan: Trek's Adventures (Nickelodeon); R. L. Stine's The Haunting Hour: The Series (Discovery Family)
Outstanding Writing in a Children's Series	**Joey Mazzarino, Molly Boylan, Annie Evans, Christine Ferraro, Emily Kingsley, Luis Santeiro, Ed Valentine, Belinda Ward, and John Weidman** for **Sesame Street (PBS)**; Tim McKeon, Alexandra Fox, Rachel Lewis, and Adam Peltzman for Odd Squad (PBS); Jim Kreig for Spooksville (Discovery Family)

=== Drama Series ===
Category	Winners and nominees
Outstanding New Approaches Drama Series	**The Bay (Blip)**; Anacostia (YouTube); Beacon Hill the Series (beaconhilltheseries.com); East Los High (Hulu)
Outstanding Performer in a New Approaches Drama Series	**Martha Byrne** as **Alexis Jordan/Joanne Edwards** on **Anacostia** (YouTube); Sarah Brown as Katherine Wesley on Beacon Hill the Series (beaconhilltheseries.com); Andrea Evans as Vivian Price on DeVanity (devanity.com); Alicia Minshew as Sara Preston on Beacon Hill the Series (beaconhilltheseries.com); Vannessa Vasquez as Camila Barrios on East Los High (Hulu); Danielle Vega as Ceci Camayo on East Los High (Hulu)
Outstanding Special Guest Performer in a Drama Series	**Donna Mills** as **Madeline Reeves** on **General Hospital (ABC)**; **Fred Willard** as **John Forrester** on **The Bold and the Beautiful (CBS)**; **Ray Wise** as **Ian Ward** on **The Young and the Restless (CBS)**; Meredith Baxter as Maureen Russell on The Young and the Restless (CBS); Sally Kellerman as Constance Bingham on The Young and the Restless (CBS); Linda Elena Tovar as Rosalie Martinez on General Hospital (ABC)
Outstanding Art Direction/Set Decoration/Scenic Design for a Drama Series	**Days of Our Lives (NBC)**; The Bold and the Beautiful (CBS); General Hospital (ABC); The Young and the Restless (CBS)
Outstanding Casting Director for a Drama Series	**Mark Teschner** for **General Hospital (ABC)**; Judy Blye Wilson for The Young and the Restless (CBS); Marnie Saitta for Days of Our Lives (NBC)
Outstanding Costume Design for a Drama Series	**The Bold and the Beautiful (CBS)**; Days of Our Lives (NBC); General Hospital (ABC); The Young and the Restless (CBS)
Outstanding Multiple Camera Editing for a Drama Series	**Days of Our Lives (NBC)**; The Bold and the Beautiful (CBS); General Hospital (ABC); The Young and the Restless (CBS)
Outstanding Hairstyling for a Drama Series	**The Young and the Restless (CBS)**; The Bold and the Beautiful (CBS); Days of Our Lives (NBC); General Hospital (ABC)
Outstanding Lighting Direction for a Drama Series	**The Young and the Restless (CBS)**; The Bold and the Beautiful (CBS); General Hospital (ABC)
Outstanding Makeup for a Drama Series	**General Hospital (ABC)**; The Bold and the Beautiful (CBS); Days of Our Lives (NBC); The Young and the Restless (CBS)
Outstanding Music Direction and Composition for a Drama Series	**The Bold and the Beautiful (CBS)**; Days of Our Lives (NBC); General Hospital (ABC); The Young and the Restless (CBS)
Outstanding Original Song – Drama	**"Hands of Time"** ~ composers & lyricists **Bradley Bell, Anthony Ferrari, and Casey Kasprzyk** – **The Bold and the Beautiful (CBS)**; "Just Breathe" ~ composers & lyricists Joshua Arreguin, Julie Carmona Young, Addie Hamilton, and Marty Medriano – The Young and the Restless (CBS); "Little Things" ~ composers & lyricists Nikola Bedingfield and Eve Nelson – General Hospital (ABC); "Reaching" ~ composer & lyricist Robert Hartry – General Hospital (ABC)
Outstanding Live and Direct to Tape Sound Mixing for a Drama Series	**Days of Our Lives (NBC)**; The Bold and the Beautiful (CBS); General Hospital (ABC); The Young and the Restless (CBS)
Outstanding Technical Team for a Drama Series	**The Bold and the Beautiful (CBS)**; Days of Our Lives (NBC); General Hospital (ABC); The Young and the Restless (CBS)

=== Outstanding Legal/Courtroom Series ===
Category	Winners and nominees
Outstanding Legal/Courtroom Program	**The People's Court (Syndicated)**; Divorce Court (Syndicated); Judge Judy (Syndicated)

=== Lifestyle, Culinary, and Travel programs ===
Category	Winners and nominees
Outstanding Lifestyle Program	**Home Made Simple (OWN)**; Flea Market Flip (HGTV); This Old House (PBS)
Outstanding Travel Program	**Rock the Park (The CW)**
Outstanding Lifestyle/Travel/Children's Series Host	**Brandon McMillan** – **Lucky Dog (CBS)**
Outstanding Culinary Host	**Bobby Flay** – **Bobby Flay's Barbecue Addiction** (Food Network)

=== Outstanding Spanish Programs ===
Category	Winners and nominees
Outstanding Entertainment Program in Spanish	**El Gordo y la Flaca (Univision)**
Outstanding Daytime Talent in a Spanish Language Program	**Carlos Calderón** – **El Gordo y la Flaca (Univision)**

=== Special Classes ===
Category	Winners and nominees
Outstanding Special Class Series	**The Henry Ford's Innovation Nation (CBS)**
Outstanding Special Class Special	**Laverne Cox Presents: The T Word (CBS)**
Outstanding Special Class – Short Format Daytime Program	**True Champions: Depression (HealthiNation)**
Outstanding Writing Special Class	**The Talk (CBS)**
Outstanding Single Camera Editing	The Henry Ford's Innovation Nation (CBS); The Mind of a Chef (PBS); Got Your 6 (MTV); Odd Squad (PBS)
