= Ice Cream Man (1995 film) =

- Direct-to-video release poster
- Directed by: Norman Apstein
- Written by: Sven Davison; David Dobkin
- Story by: David Dobkin
- Produced by: Norman Apstein
- Starring: Clint Howard; Olivia Hussey; David Naughton; Jan-Michael Vincent; David Warner
- Cinematography: Garrett Griffin
- Edited by: Andre Vaillancourt
- Music by: Richard Lyons
- Production companies: Doublesteen Productions; David M. Goldstein Productions
- Distributed by: A-Pix Entertainment; Ardustry Home Entertainment
- Release date: May 9, 1995 (United States)
- Running time: 86 minutes
- Country: United States
- Language: English
- Budget: $2 million

Ice Cream Man is a 1995 American direct-to-video black comedy slasher film produced and directed by Paul Norman, a director of pornographic films (under the pseudonym "Norman Apstein"), and written by Sven Davison and David Dobkin. The film stars Clint Howard, Olivia Hussey, Jan-Michael Vincent, David Warner and David Naughton. The film's plot follows a deranged man who was recently released from a psychiatric institution and opens up an ice cream factory where he begins using human flesh in his recipes. The film had an estimated $2 million budget. It was released at Chicago's Brew and View for the Clint Howard Film Festival in 1995, on DVD on October 19, 2004, and on Blu-ray and DVD by Vinegar Syndrome in 2017.

== Plot ==
In a Californian suburb, young Gregory Tudor watches as a local ice cream man, Butch Brickle, known as "The Ice Cream King", is murdered in a drive-by shooting incident. In the present day, Gregory has taken over the "Ice Cream King's" business, calling himself "The Ice Cream Prince", and using the man's truck and parlor right up to the present day. Unbeknownst to the public, Gregory uses the dilapidated parlor as a sort of laboratory, where he produces his concoctions, filled with insects and dismembered human pieces.

One night, Gregory kills a dog belonging to Nurse Wharton, his landlord and an orderly who treated him for his childhood trauma. The same night, Roger, a neighborhood boy, goes missing. Having witnessed Gregory's creepy personality, the other children suspect him of kidnapping Roger, but the police and Wharton do not. Three kids, Johnny, Heather, and Tuna, agree to search for Roger. Soon after, another boy known as Small Paul disappears.

Initially unable to prove that Gregory is dangerous, the kids have a difficult time getting the police to pursue their claims. Meanwhile, Gregory has recurring flashbacks to his abusive treatment at the Wishing Well Sanatorium. As the kids dig deeper, they discover that Gregory kidnapped Roger and Small Paul, and imprisons them in a cage at the parlor. However, Small Paul shows a macabre interest in the experiments, so Gregory takes him under his wing.

Two detectives investigate the Wishing Well, which is unregulated and free-for-all; the unstable patients roam freely and cause chaos, while the doctors and administrators are insane. Escaping, the police now believe the children, and prepare to search for Roger and Small Paul. Gregory kidnaps Tuna, and Heather enlists the help of Johnny's older brother Jacob to investigate, but Gregory kills Jacob and his girlfriend. Small Paul baits Gregory by holding a photo of the Ice Cream King over his face, and leads him into the main mixer, where Gregory is dismembered.

Roger and Tuna are reunited with their friends, who reveal that Small Paul has been sent to therapy. The final scene shows Small Paul alone in a darkened room, silently churning an ice cream bucket, his face twisted into an evil leer, just like Gregory's.

== Cast ==
- Clint Howard as Gregory Tudor
  - Matthew McCurley as Young Gregory Tudor
- Justin Isfeld as Johnny Spodak
- Anndi McAfee as Heather Langley
- JoJo Adams as Tuna Cassera
- Mikey LeBeau as Small Paul
- Zachary Benjamin as Roger Smith
- Olivia Hussey as Nurse Wharton
- David Naughton as Martin Cassera
- Sandahl Bergman as Marion Cassera
- Karl Makinen as Jacob Spodak
- Steve Garvey as Mr. Spodak
- Janet Wood as Mrs. Spodak
- Andrea Evans as Wanda
- Stephanie Champlin as Janet
- Jan-Michael Vincent as Detective Gifford
- Lee Majors II as Detective Maldwyn
- Tom Reilly as Charley
- Stephen Fiachi as Gus
- David Warner as Reverend Langley
- Jeanine Anderson as Mrs. Langley
- Jessica Devlin as Mrs. Smith
- Marla Frees as Gregory's Mother
- Keith Mills as Butcher
- Doug Llewelyn as Store Manager
- Ed Morgan as Crazy Doctor (credited as Edwin T. Morgan)
- Tori Welles as Woman in Market (credited as Brittania Paris)
- E.E. Bell as Happy Doctor
- Cole S. McKay as Ice Cream King
- Kendall McCarthy as Police Officer
- Ken Hanes as Police Officer
- Ryan Holihan as Photo Clerk (credited as Ryan Hanes)
- Frank Roach as Park Janitor
- Carly Adams as Little Girl
- Nicolas Norman as Boy (uncredited)
- Roger Ferreira as Doctor (uncredited)
- Norman Apstein as Sanatorium Patient (uncredited)

== Production ==
=== Development ===
Inspired by films such as The Goonies and The Monster Squad and the miniseries It, Paul Norman decided to create a horror film aimed at children, in his first and only attempt at mainstream filmmaking. The idea for the film came through an ill-advised call for scripts. Sven Davison and David Dobkin were hired to write the film's screenplay. The first draft of the script was written in three days. Another early draft for the screenplay had the film being a spoof on the horror genre.

=== Casting ===
Clint Howard was cast in the lead role of Gregory Tudor. For his performance, Howard drew inspiration from an ice cream man that swore at children in his hometown. He screamed and yelled at the top of his lungs while driving every day to the set, in order to portray Gregory with a more gravelly, raspy voice. David Naughton signed on to play Martin Cassera, having reportedly fallen in love with the script, which reminded him of John Landis' script for An American Werewolf in London, another horror film that Naughton had appeared in. David Warner portrayed Reverend Langley, filming all his scenes in two days. Child actor JoJo Adams wore a pillow under his shirt to appear fat for his role as Tuna Cassera. Steve Garvey, who played Mr. Spodak, only worked for one day on the film, spending half the day signing baseballs for his fans. Jan-Michael Vincent, who played Detective Gifford, was constantly drunk during production. Other actors and actresses cast for the film included Justin Isfeld, Anndi McAfee, Mikey LeBeau, Zachary Benjamin, Olivia Hussey, Sandahl Bergman, Karl Makinen, Janet Wood, Andrea Evans, Stephanie Champlin, Lee Majors II, Tom Reilly, Stephen Fiachi, Jeanine Anderson, Jessica Devlin, and Marla Frees. Producer David M. Goldstein had hopes that having established actors like Howard, Naughton, Hussey and Warner would give the film's production a sense of professionalism. Norman's then-wife Tori Welles wanted to be in the film, so a scene was written for her in which she played a woman at the supermarket. Norman and his son Nicolas also had cameos as a patient at the Wishing Well Sanatorium and a boy standing in line for Greg's ice cream.

=== Filming ===
The film was shot on a $2 million budget in California in March 1994, with the locations including Norman's own neighborhood and house, Canoga Park (the playground), Chatsworth (the opening scene), San Gabriel (the Langley, Spodak and Cassera families' and Wanda's houses), Valley Glen (the print shop), Topanga Canyon (the ice cream plant), and the La Vina Respiratory Hospital in Altadena (the Wishing Well Sanatorium). It was sponsored in part by shoe company Converse; according to Benjamin, the actors were directed to wear Chuck Taylor All-Stars.

The film was initially set to have a PG-13 rating, but was given an R rating instead due to the heavy amount of blood, gore and gross-out imagery.

=== Special effects ===
The makeup effects were done by David P. Barton, Bryan Blair, Alan C. Bosshardt, Denise Dillion, Mark Garbarino, Terese Heddon, Gary Pawlowski and Shauna Giesbrecht. Mashed potatoes were used as a substitute for ice cream in many shots.

== Reception and legacy ==
The film received mixed reviews upon release. Paul Norman stated that the film initially did not have an audience, saying that making the film "more kid-friendly" contributed to its failure, and that he "made a movie for preteens that no mother of preteens would allow them to see". David Goldstein stated the film became a "total disaster" due to a financial miscalculation. In later years, it attained a cult following.

The film was also spoofed by RiffTrax on August 17, 2018.

The film was given a film festival screening at Burbank International Film Festival, in partnership with AMC Theaters and Baskin-Robbins, on August 7, 2026 with a red carpet, meet-and-greet with Howard, and complementary ice cream.

== Sequel ==
On October 9, 2014, a Kickstarter campaign, backed by star Clint Howard, was started to fund a sequel (titled Ice Cream Man 2: Sundae Bloody Sundae) to coincide with the film's 20th anniversary. Its goal was to raise at least $300,000 from crowdsourcing; 70 backers donated approximately $4,000. The campaign was closed on October 30, 2014. The organizers told supporters that the project for a sequel had not been abandoned and that they were seeking a new crowdfunding structure, as well as alternative financing. On September 11, 2025, Howard announced that the sequel was in pre-production. In November 2026, the sequel was re-titled Another Ice Cream Man and was being co-directed by Howard and Carmelo Chimera.
