= Ricky Paull Goldin =

American actor

- Born: Richard Paull Goldin; January 5, 1965 (age 61); San Francisco, California, U.S.
- Other names: Ricky Paul; Ricky G. Paull; Ricky Paull
- Occupations: Actor, producer, director, television personality
- Years active: 1968–present
- Spouse: Emma Ford (m. 2001; div. 2002)
- Partner: Gretta Monahan (2009–present)
- Children: 2
- Relatives: Jack Gold (uncle)
- Website: His Official Website

Richard Paull Goldin (born January 5, 1965) is an American actor, producer, director and television personality. He is best known for his roles in daytime drama as Dean Frame on NBC's Another World, Gus Aitoro on CBS' Guiding Light, and Jake Martin on ABC's All My Children. In May 2013, Goldin joined the cast of the CBS' The Bold and the Beautiful. Goldin also hosts the HGTV series Spontaneous Construction, which premiered on the network on February 15, 2013.

== Early life ==
Goldin was born in San Francisco, California, the son of Paul Goldin, a London-born entertainer, behavioral psychologist and hypnotist who hosted in his own show in England, and Irish actress P.J. Goldin. Paul Goldin was born into a Jewish family, the son of a French father and English mother. Goldin has siblings: Sarah, David, Bobby and Katie-Jane. His uncle is British film director Jack Gold.

Goldin made his television debut at the age of three when he appeared in an episode of Romper Room. The family returned to England the following year when Goldin was four years old. Goldin's parents divorced when he was seven. When Goldin was 13, the family returned to the United States and settled in New York City and ultimately Atlantic Beach, New York, After appearing in approximately 150 television commercials as a teen, Goldin won a role in the Broadway production of On Golden Pond when he was 17.

== Career ==
=== Television and films ===
In 1985, Goldin starred in the ABC sitcom, Hail to the Chief, playing the son of the first female President of the United States (played by Patty Duke). The series was canceled after one season. Goldin also had a recurring role on the 1980s sitcom Kate & Allie as Allie's daughter Jenny's boyfriend, Jason. In 1988 and 1989 he also appeared in two episodes of the sitcom television series ALF playing the character of Lynn Tanner's love interest, Danny Duckworth. In 1993, he hosted the short-lived, primetime reality dating show Street Match on ABC.

Goldin has appeared in several made-for-TV movies, including A Face to Die For in 1996 with Yasmine Bleeth. That same year, he also co-starred in Talk to Me, again with Yasmine Bleeth. Among his movie credits, Goldin has had roles in Piranha II: The Spawning (1981), The Blob (1988) and Lambada (1990).

==== Soap opera roles ====
Goldin is best known for portraying Dean Frame on the NBC daytime drama Another World, a role he played from 1990 to 1993, from 1994 to 1995, and again briefly in 1998. He also appeared on the CBS top daytime drama The Young and the Restless as stalker Gary Dawson from 1999 to 2000.

In 2001, Goldin began portraying Gus Aitoro on the longest-running, but now canceled, soap opera Guiding Light on CBS. He portrayed the role from 2001 until his character was killed off on April 1, 2008. Goldin was twice nominated for a Daytime Emmy Award as Outstanding Supporting Actor for the role (in 2003 and 2007). In 2005, fans voted Goldin and former co-star Beth Ehlers and their characters, Gus and Harley Cooper, as the top couple in "The Most Irresistible Combination" contest (which was partially sponsored by Procter & Gamble, the company that produced Guiding Light). Goldin appeared in a promotion for the product I Can't Believe It's Not Butter!, which is also promoted by Procter & Gamble.

On March 5, 2008, a week after he announced he would be leaving the role of Gus on Guiding Light, Goldin joined All My Children in the recast role of Dr. Joseph "Jake" Martin. In 2010, he was nominated for his third Daytime Emmy Award, his first for his work on All My Children, in the Outstanding Supporting Actor category. In 2011, he was nominated again, this time in the Outstanding Lead Actor category for All My Children. Goldin remained with All My Children through to the final episode on September 23, 2011. Goldin also hosted five Live from the Red Carpet Emmy shows for Disney/ABC. After All My Children ended in September 2011, Goldin was seen on the internet in an on-line advertising web series that was a joint venture between Kellogg's and Disney Family. He appeared in a parody of daytime drama entitled The Young and the Breakfast.

On March 18, 2013, it was announced that Goldin will be joining the CBS soap The Bold and the Beautiful on May 15, 2013 on a recurring status. In 2014, Goldin played Andrew Miller in the soap opera web series Beacon Hill. As a producer for the series, he was nominated for a 2015 Daytime Emmy for Outstanding New Approaches Drama Series.

=== Stage ===
At age 15, Goldin appeared in the Broadway production of On Golden Pond. In 1994, he returned to Broadway as Danny Zuko in the Broadway revival of the musical Grease. He followed up with the starring role in the Gilbert & Sullivan operetta Pirates of Penzance in London and Dublin, Ireland. Goldin has also appeared in several off Broadway productions including Nest Of The Wood Grouse, Feathered Serpent, Happy Journey, Queens of France, Long Christmas Dinner, and Our Town.

== Other works ==
=== Producing ===
Goldin began producing stage and television productions while in his 20s. He and Gabe Sachs of Sachs/Judah and produced the reality dating show Street Match for ABC. Goldin also partnered with Bruce Nash of Nash Enterprises for a TV pilot called Wired & Fired.

In 2001, he co-created and produced a variety show-style pilot for Viacom called FLY TV. In 2003, Godlin spent time on location in Dubai producing ESPN2's The Celebrity Arabian Adventure, and the in-flight programming for the airline Emirates. Goldin also created and produced Seeing VS Believing, a one-hour special premiered on TLC in May 2010.

In 2015, Goldin served as the director and executive producer of Hidden Heroes, a reality television series produced by Chicken Soup for the Soul. The program, which aired as part of CBS’s Dream Team Saturday morning lineup, highlighted everyday individuals performing acts of kindness and making positive contributions to their communities.

=== Real estate works ===
Beyond his work in television, Goldin started working in luxury real estate. He is the founder of GoldBarn Homes, a design and construction firm . Goldin and his partner, lifestyle expert Gretta Monahan, have undertaken several projects in the Hamptons and Palm Beach areas. Their work includes the restoration of a historic 19th-century Sag Harbor residence, which was listed for $5.9 million after a $3 million renovation.

Goldin holds the position of Senior Executive in Business Affairs at Knocking, Inc., a digital media and e-commerce company. In this role, he collaborates with the company's Hustle Team to develop and manage content partnerships.

== Personal life ==
Goldin began dating actress Yasmine Bleeth in 1989. They became engaged in January 1995. Goldin and Bleeth ended their relationship later that year. Goldin was later engaged to actress and Playboy model Priscilla Taylor. In November 2001, Goldin married British television presenter Emma Ford. They divorced in 2002.

Goldin began dating TV fashion personality Gretta Monahan in 2009. Together, they have two sons — one born in October 2010 and a second in June 2017.
