= Madison James =

Fictional character from 'Days of Our Lives'

- Days of Our Lives character
- Portrayed by: Sarah Joy Brown
- Duration: 2011–2012
- First appearance: October 4, 2011
- Last appearance: August 15, 2012
- Created by: Marlene Clark Poulter and Darrell Ray Thomas, Jr.
- Introduced by: Ken Corday, Noel Maxam and Greg Meng
In-universe information
- Other names: Madison McEntyre
- Occupation: CEO of Mad World Cosmetics
- Sisters: Becky
- Husband: Ian McAllister

Madison James is a fictional character from the Days of Our Lives, an American soap opera on the NBC network. Created by head writers Marlene Clark Poulter and Darrell Ray Thomas, Jr., she was portrayed by Daytime Emmy Award winning actress Sarah Joy Brown, who made her debut in October 2011. Introduced into the series as the headstrong CEO of Mad World Cosmetics and as a potential love interest for Brady Black (Eric Martsolf), Madison is the longtime competitor and rival against series veteran Kate Roberts (Lauren Koslow), and her resurrection of Countess Wilhelmina. Originally introduced with an unknown past. In April 2012, it was announced that Brown was let go; she last appeared in August 2012, when the character was killed off following an explosion.

== Casting and characterization ==
"I want to bring joy to my audience. I am having fun. And if its drama and it’s good and well-written, and people who are writing it are watching what is going on out there, this could be amazing. I know what kind of show in the daytime would get my daughter, my mother, and me all running to the TV set. So I am really exciting about this and I think Greg Meng knows that too."

— Brown on what she hoped to achieve by joining the series.

In July 2011, it was announced that soap veteran Sarah Joy Brown would join the cast of Days of our Lives as newly created character Madison James. Brown, best known for her role as Carly Corinthos from 1996 to 2001 on the ABC Daytime series General Hospital, had just finished her run as Aggie Jones on the CBS Daytime soap The Bold and the Beautiful.

Brown unveiled that it was important to make every character look different and that Madison's look would be unlike any she had before, stating:

As an actor, I was trained that it was very important to make every character different [...] With Madison, it's a lot of fun because she's really cutting edge. I'm stealing from Sarah Jessica Parker's SEX AND THE CITY look. There are softer fabrics and pieces of jewelry that you won't find on anyone else on the show. There won't be as much black and dark colors for this character. Sandy/Agnes wore soft feminine colors, but she was much more cautious about the way she dressed. Madison's the boss, so she can pretty much do what she wants!

In an interview, Brown opened up about her new role on the NBC series and working as Madison James. She stated:

"It's been wonderful [...] I'm just having a great time, creatively. I'm really enjoying the work of the two head writers. I'm really enjoying the way that the set works, that we have a producer on set, on the stage with us, watching everything as it happens, who's able to walk right onto the set and give notes. I think he's really quite brilliant and gives the best notes. I really, really think Noel (Maxam, Co-Executive Producer) is brilliant. His notes always take me to another place. 'Yeah, that's right. Yeah, I get what you're saying. That's right, okay, I love it.' I just think he really knows what he's doing. I've never heard him ever come out and give a cheesy note. I'm just appreciative. I'm surrounded by an extremely talented cast and crew. And they're really fun! So every day is fun. I'm going to Disneyland everyday! I love it."

In April 2012, it was announced that Brown had been let go from the series in just the beginning of several cast cuts coming up in the future. Co-executive producer Greg Meng said that the show would once again be rebooted, however, returns of the exiting characters could become possible. Brown departed the series on August 15, 2012.

== Storylines ==
Madison James appeared in Salem for a business meeting with Brady Black (Eric Martsolf) and Victor Kiriakis (John Aniston). She is introduced as the CEO of Mad World Cosmetics, a company that Titan Industries was interested in acquiring. After an awkward encounter with Brady prior to their meeting, the three got down to business and stuck a deal for Titan to purchase Mad World Cosmetics. Madison also showed off her determination and fearless to go against competitor Kate DiMera (Lauren Koslow), her competition in the cosmetics world. Not only did she have Brady and Victor in her corner, but she also hired her childhood friend, Sami Brady (Alison Sweeney), as her junior executive.

Brady and Madison began flirting almost immediately. Despite her stance that she doesn't date men that she works with, they continued their flirtation. During a blackout at the Titan offices, Madison opens up about her past and her family, which leads to the pair becoming closer, and eventually sharing a kiss. Supporting Brady, she urges him to visit his father John Black (Drake Hogestyn), who was currently in custody under house arrest, on fraud charges.

To avoid her blooming feelings for Brady, Madison focused her efforts on taking down her professional competition, Countess Wilamena. Madison hires childhood friend Sami to devise a plan of staged arguments in front of Kate, to make Kate think that Kate could hire Sami away from Mad World. While devising her plan against Kate, Madison's relationship with Brady turns stale when he begins to give her the cold shoulder. Confused, she takes the initiative. and kisses him on impulse, eventually leading to a night of passion; following their night together, they agree to give the relationship a chance. Despite agreeing with Brady to keep their relationship secret free, Madison continues to receive mysterious phone calls about her being in Salem. Madison and Brady are then railroaded when their plan backfires, and Sami quits MadWorld to go work permanently for Kate at Countess Wilhelmina. However, under Madison's plan, it is revealed that Sami did not truly quit Mad World, and is acting as an informant and company spy for Madison inside Coutness W.

Brady and Madison continue to spend their time together, on both professional and personal levels. Madison lends her support and OK to Brady for his decision to leave Titan and join his father at Basic Black.

When her relationship with Brady begins to hit a standstill, Madison agrees to end her crusade against Kate and the pair admit their love for each other. Realizing their love Brady proposes to Madison; before an answer could be given a mystery man, Ian McAllister (Ian Buchanan), arrives in Salem and states that he is Madison's husband. Ian instructs Madison to break off her relationship with Brady, claiming it as untrue. Madison then blames Brady for the failure of the relationship, reminding him that she told him to keep the relationship strictly professional. He then says he didn't know her like he thought he knew her. He confesses that he's never worked as hard for a woman as he had with Madison, trying to break down her barriers. Brady then tells Madison to leave the Kiriakis Mansion and to never look his way again, officially ending his relationship with her.

"Don't know if it's true, but, who ever leaked that story should consider that no one wants to find out they have lost their job via Twitter [...] Ken Corday & Greg Meng are class, they would not do that to us. Wasn't them who leaked it, & I didn't hear it first on Twitter. Who leaked?"

— Brown on finding out she was let go from the series.

In February 2012, Victor announced that Ian would be taking over the CEO of Titan Industries. After finding out his secret with Madison, Victor attempts to rescind the offer, but Ian declares it's too late. Brady visits Madison in her hotel room and demands the know the whole truth. She reveals that she met Ian in college while running MadWorld out of her trunk. Madison then reveals that Ian had many conquests during their marriage and that he put Kate above all of the rest. Madison confesses that Ian expects her to be weak when he's around and that she's tried to change things, but she owes him, with Ian making it clear he would not be letting Madison go under any pretense.

After attempting to divorce him, Ian insists on staying with Madison, even framing her into the marriage stating that if she continued her relationship with Brady he would pursue federal charges against him. Ian finally agrees to divorce Madison, allowing her to go on with her relationship with Brady as she wished. The two reconnect, with Brady immediately proposing marriage once again; this time, she answered yes. Ian then dropped the bomb on Madison that Kate would be invited to become a co-CEO of Mad World to work alongside Madison as competition against Sami and her reign on Countess Wilhelmina. As Brady and Madison continue on with their relationship, eventually becoming engaged and the pair begin to plan their upcoming wedding. Their happiness is once again put at risk when it comes to light that Brady may be on drugs once again, actually being poisoned by Ian. Madison confides that if he did not take a drug test, after seeming off during a meeting at the Brady Pub, she would not enter into another unstable marriage. When Brady agrees to the a take drug, and it turns out to be positive, Madison leaves feeling betrayed by Brady.

During a special event being held in honor of the late Dr. Lexie Carver (Renée Jones), Madison plans to wed Brady. However, when he does not show up for their pre-ceremony, she goes to leave. After being stopped by Ian, an explosion hits and knocks them unconscious. When Ian comes to, he finds Madison and tries to awaken her. In his arms, Madison cries out for Brady and tells him she loves him; she dies in Ian's arms.
