= Melanie Irons =

Australian actress and community worker

Melanie Irons is an actress and community organizer from Hobart, Tasmania, Australia. Irons came to prominence in 2013 in the aftermath of the Dunalley Fire as the creator of the Tassie Fires We Can Help Facebook page. Since September 2013 she has co-starred in the indie web series Noirhouse. She is also a member of the council of Brand Tasmania, the state government agency that acts as custodian of the Tasmania brand. She is a 2015 Australia Day ambassador, won the Tasmania Non-Profit Sector of the 2013 Attorney General's Resilient Australia Award and was a 2014 Young Australian of the Year State Finalist.

== Tassie Fires We Can Help ==
On 4 January 2013, Irons created her Facebook page while babysitting a friend's child, wanting to help with the fire-fighting effort. The local ABC radio assisted her in spreading the word, and the page amassed 21,000 followers within 18 days. Her work with her Tassie Fires We Can Help page was credited as a major influence and help during the destruction of the town of Dunalley, Tasmania, organising aid, communicating with the community and acting as an alert system. Her page also prompted Tasmania Police to open their own social media accounts. She was the focus on an ABC Australian Story documentary Irons In The Fire.

== Acting ==
Irons has starred in the web series Noirhouse since September 2013. For her work in the series she has won an Australian WebStream Award for Best Female Performance and was nominated for Best Sexy Actress from the Rome Web Awards.
