= Tina Sloan =

American actress and author (born 1943)

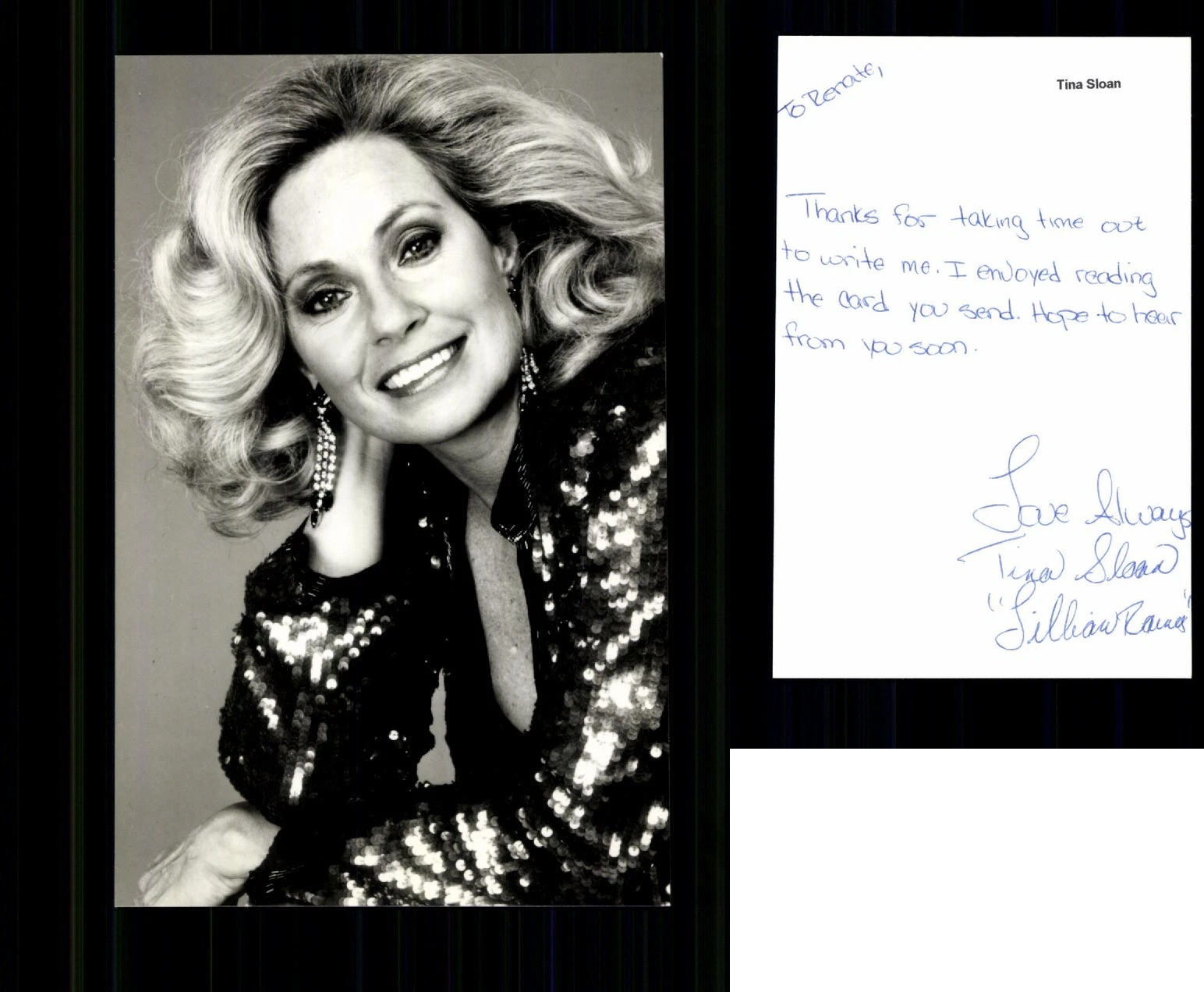
- Born: February 1, 1943 (age 83); Bronxville, New York, U.S.
- Education: Manhattanville College
- Occupations: Actress; author
- Years active: 1974-present
- Spouse: Steve McPherson (m. 1975)
- Children: 1
- Website: tinasloan.com

Tina Sloan (born February 1, 1943) is an American actress and author. She is best known for playing the role of Lillian Raines on the CBS soap opera Guiding Light from 1983 until the show's final broadcast in 2009. Since the cancellation of Guiding Light, she has published three books, Changing Shoes, a nonfiction book about aging gracefully, and two novels in a romantic thriller series, Chasing Cleopatra and Chasing Othello.

== Early life ==
Sloan was born and raised in Bronxville, New York. Her father was a Harvard University educated lawyer and her mother was a homemaker. She has one brother and one sister. She attended The Ursuline School and Manhattanville College. After college, she attended the Royal Academy of Dramatic Arts. She studied acting with Bob McAndrew and Warren Robertson.

== Career ==
Sloan played Kate Thornton Cannell on the NBC soap opera Somerset from 1974–1976. She then joined the cast of the CBS soap opera Search for Tomorrow, playing Patti Barron Tate McCleary from 1976–1977. Her next role was on the NBC soap opera Another World as Dr. Olivia Delaney, from 1980–1981.

She has appeared on stage in The Apple Tree, Everything in the Garden, and Saint Joan. Her Off-Broadway credits include Blithe Spirit, The Song of Bernadette, The Bread Man, The Art of Falling, The Labor Party, and What Are You Doing For Lunch Today?

Sloan was cast as Lillian Raines on the CBS soap opera Guiding Light, first airing in May 1983. The character of Lillian was a nurse and the mother of Beth Raines (Beth Chamberlin). Sloan had an uncredited role in the film She-Devil (1989). She played a Waiting Room Patient in the film Celebrity (1998), directed by Woody Allen. She played a Kensington Guest in The Curse of the Jade Scorpion (2001), also directed by Woody Allen. The same year, she guest starred on Third Watch.

Sloan played Mrs. Delano in the thriller film Changing Lanes (2002), co-starring with Ben Affleck. The same year, she played Kitty in the comedy film The Guru. She also appeared in the crime drama film People I Know, co-starring with Al Pacino. In 2003, she guest starred on Law & Order: Special Victims Unit. Sloan appeared in the film The Brave One (2007), co-starring with Jodie Foster.

The cancellation of Guiding Light was announced on April 1, 2009. Sloan appeared on the show until the final episode, airing September 18, 2009. She joined the cast of the web series Venice: The Series, playing the role of Katherine Pierce. She played Mrs. Fithian in the film Black Swan (2010), directed by Darren Aronofsky. In 2010, Sloan wrote a nonfiction book, Changing Shoes: Getting Older--NOT OLD--with Style, Humor, and Grace. She also wrote a one-woman show to go along with the book, touring the U.S. with several stops in Florida. In November 2010, she performed in the play Wings at New York's Second Stage Theater.

In 2014, Sloan began playing Louise Cassell on the web series Beacon Hill. In 2020, she released a new book, Chasing Cleopatra: A novel of love, betrayal, and suspense. Its sequel, Chasing Othello, was published in 2022. In March 2022, Sloan was a donor and collaborator for The Playwrights Realm's interactive fundraiser, Play on Words, a one night live streamed festival of short new plays.

== Personal life ==
Sloan's first marriage was to a writer who had predeceased her by the time she was twenty-eight. She met businessman Steve McPherson at a dinner party five years later and they were married in 1975. She had eight miscarriages before giving birth to their son in 1980. Their son is now a Harvard graduate who served as a captain in the Marine Corps. They have three grandchildren. Sloan also has two stepchildren from McPherson's previous relationship.

She has run eight marathons. She has climbed to the summit of Mount Kilimanjaro in Africa and also climbed a 20,000-foot peak in Nepal. Sloan is on the board of advisors for Outward Bound.

== Filmography ==
=== Film ===
Year	Title	Role	Notes
1989	She-Devil		Uncredited
1998	Celebrity	Waiting Room Patient	
2001	The Curse of the Jade Scorpion	Kensington Guest	
2002	Changing Lanes	Mrs. Delano	
2002	The Guru	Kitty	
2002	People I Know	Dr. Napier's Receptionist	
2006	Well Fed and Comfortable	Mrs. Barnes	Short film
2007	The Brave One	Stationary Saleswoman	
2010	Black Swan	Mrs. Fithian/Patron	
2011	Happy New Year	Grace	
2011	The Evil Eyes	Ruth Hollingsworth	Short film
2017	The Post	Woman	Uncredited

=== Television ===
Year	Title	Role	Notes
1974–1976	Somerset	Kate Thornton Cannell	
1975	The Wide World of Mystery	Donna	Episode: "Too Easy to Kill"
1976–1977	Search for Tomorrow	Patti Barron Tate	
1980–1981	Another World	Dr. Olivia Delaney	
1981–1982	Texas	Aunt Hildy	
1983–2009	Guiding Light	Lillian Raines	Recurring role
2001	Third Watch	Celeste Malcolm-Queeg	Episode: "Man Enough"
2003	Law & Order: Special Victims Unit	Mrs. Hartnell	Episode: "Privilege"

=== Web series ===
Year	Title	Role	Notes
2009–2019	Venice: The Series	Katherine Pierce	52 episodes
2014–2020	Beacon Hill	Louise Casell	7 episodes

== Bibliography ==
=== Books ===
- Sloan, Tina (2010). Changing Shoes: Getting Older--NOT OLD--with Style, Humor, and Grace. Gotham Books/Penguin Group in hardcover. ISBN 978-1-59240-568-8. Also released in e-book format. ISBN 9781101439333
- Sloan, Tina (2020). Chasing Cleopatra: A novel of love, betrayal, and suspense. Tati Khan Publishing. ISBN 978-1733057721
- Sloan, Tina (2022). Chasing Othello: Book 2 of the Cleopatra Chronicles. Tati Khan Publishing. ISBN 978-1733057769

=== Articles ===
- Sloan, Tina (October 18, 2011). "Yes, I climbed Mount Kilimanjaro." The Huffington Post. Retrieved April 15, 2024.
