= The Perfect Husband: The Laci Peterson Story =

2004 American television film

- DVD cover
- Written by: Dave Erickson
- Directed by: Roger Young
- Starring: Dean Cain; Sarah Joy Brown; David Denman; Dee Wallace Stone; G. W. Bailey
- Music by: Patrick Williams
- Country of origin: United States
- Original language: English

Production
- Executive producer: Diane Sokolow
- Producer: Diana Kerew
- Cinematography: James Bartle
- Editor: Benjamin A. Weissman
- Running time: 84 minutes
- Production companies: Modern Videofilm Inc.; Sokolow Company; Sony Pictures Television; Stu Segall Productions

Original release
- Release: February 13, 2004

The Perfect Husband: The Laci Peterson Story is a 2004 American made-for-television crime film based on the murder of Laci Peterson starring Dean Cain, Sarah Brown, Tracy Middendorf and Tom O'Brien.

== Plot ==
The film is told through the perspectives of Scott and Laci Peterson's friends & family, who trusted and supported Scott until they could not believe him any more.

Laci Peterson was a pregnant mother-to-be. On Christmas Eve, 2002, she disappeared. Her husband Scott Peterson, and her family go out to search for Laci, but there are no signs of her anywhere. Months go by, but the media and the public begin to suspect that Scott murdered his wife. The Rocha family support and defend Scott, until Scott's mistress Amber Frey comes forward at a press conference and admits to an affair with Scott, and photographic proof confirming their relationship surfaces. The Rochas start to doubt Scott's innocence, especially Laci's mother, Sharon, who had always believed Scott to be the perfect husband. Finally, the Rocha family publicly announce that they no longer support Scott.

In April 2003, the body of Laci and Scott's unborn son washed up on shore: the remains of a torso later identified as Laci washed up a few miles away from the baby's remains, and the two were officially declared murdered. Scott was arrested.

== Cast ==
- Dean Cain as Scott Peterson
- Sarah Joy Brown as Kate Vignatti
- David Denman as Tommy Vignatti
- Dee Wallace as Sharon Rocha
- G. W. Bailey as Detective Gates
- Tracy Lynn Middendorf as Amber Frey
- Paul Vincent O'Connor as Dennis Rocha
- Peter Jason as Ron Grantski
- Tom O'Brien as Detective Ross
- Tim Quill as Brent Rocha
- Cindy Hogan as Kim Peterson
- Palmer Davis as Angela Panati
- Heidi Marnhout as Donna Taylor
- Louise Gallagher as Jackie Peterson
- Joe Howard as Lee Peterson
- Tina Molina as Amy Rocha
- Dan Cashman as Mr. Whitman
- Jackson Jarvis as Sammy Vignatti
- Roark Critchlow as Todd Dewey
- Erin McKinley as Babysitter
- Meredith Leiber as Laci Peterson (uncredited)

== Home media ==
The film was released on Region 1 DVD on June 8, 2004 through Sony Pictures and is rated PG-13. Widescreen format, with subtitles in English, Spanish, French and Thai.

== See also ==
- List of American films of 2004
