= The Outs =

2012 American web series

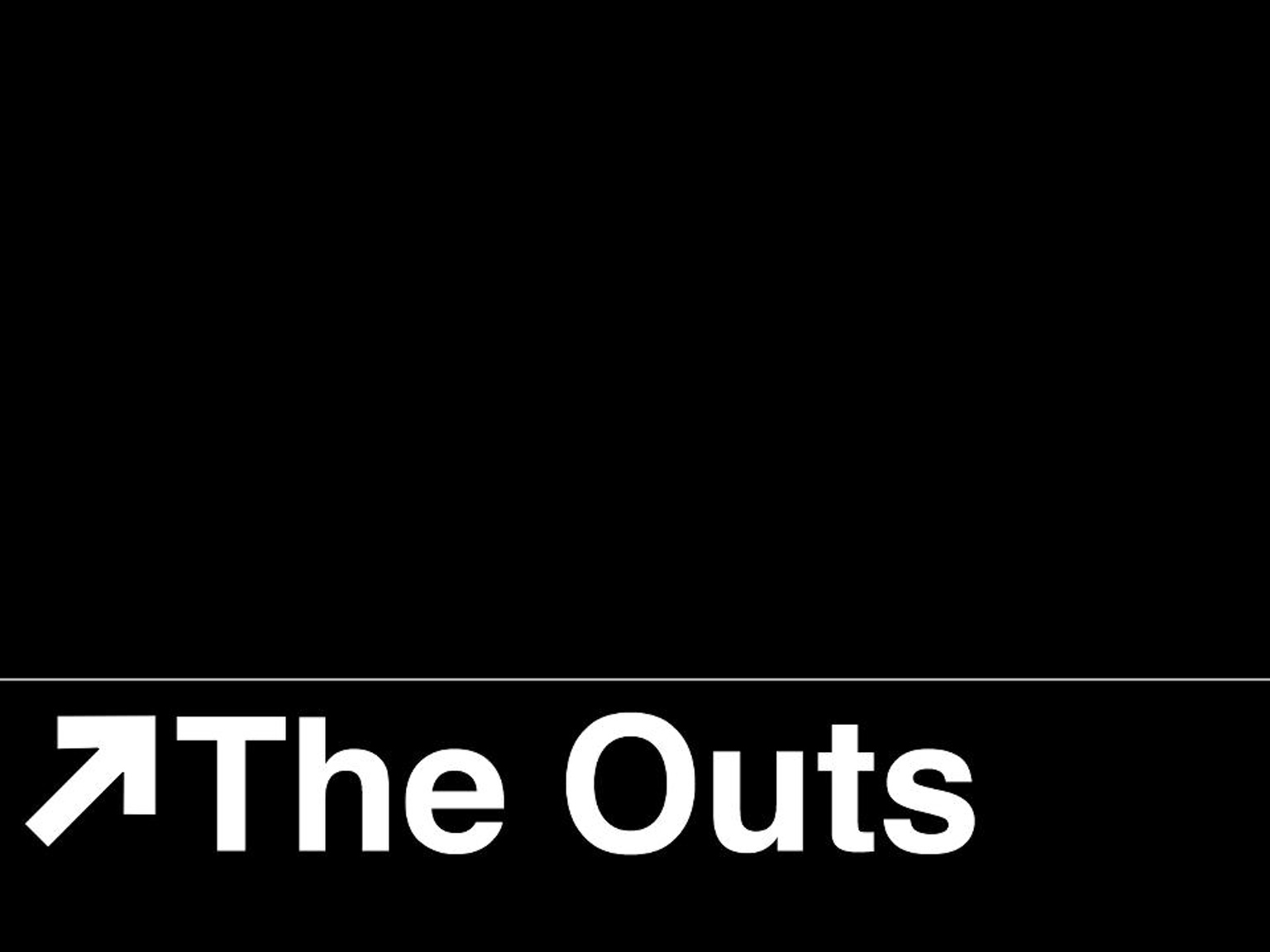
- Season 1 title card
- Genre: Drama
- Created by: Adam Goldman
- Written by: Adam Goldman; Sasha Winters
- Directed by: Adam Goldman
- Starring: Adam Goldman; Sasha Winters; Hunter Canning
- Theme music composer: Various
- Country of origin: United States
- Original language: English
- No. of episodes: 14

Original release
- Network: Vimeo
- Release: March 27, 2012 – present

The Outs is a web series which premiered on Vimeo in 2012. Filmed and set in Brooklyn, New York, the show tells the story of Mitchell (played by Adam Goldman), his best friend Oona (Sasha Winters), and his ex-boyfriend Jack (Hunter Canning). It debuted in March 2012 with a run of six episodes, with a "Chanukah Special" in April 2013. A second season of six episodes began in March 2016, followed by a special December 2016 episode.

== Plot ==
Following their breakup, Mitchell and Jack navigate gay life in New York.

== Cast ==
- Adam Goldman as Mitchell Webb
- Sasha Winters as Oona Halpern, Mitchell's best friend
- Hunter Canning as Jack Widdows, Mitchell's ex-boyfriend
- Tommy Heleringer as Paul "Scruffy", Jack's newest love interest
- Phillip Taratula as Ty, Mitchell's sassy friend and former coworker
- Alan Cumming as Himself
- Owen Scott as Frank, Jack's straight stoner friend
- Shawn Frank as Russell, a guy Oona dates (season 1)
- Sean Patrick McGowan as Drew, Oona's ex-boyfriend who slept with Jack (season 1)
- Jon Golbe as Cute Delivery Guy (season 1)
- William DeMeritt as Kevin, Oona's publisher and lover (season 2)
- Mark Junek as Rob, Mitchell's chef boyfriend (season 2)
- Becky Yamamoto as Leila, Mitchell's coworker (season 2)
- Joel Perez as Eli, a guy with whom Jack has regular casual sex (season 2)
- Cecil Baldwin as Braden, Mitchell's roommate (season 2)
- Patricia Buckley as Leah, Oona's editor (season 2)
- Bowen Yang as Jason, Leah's assistant (season 2)
- Michael Cyril Creighton as Gordy, Mitchell's gay coworker/nemesis (season 2)
- Dan Savage as Himself (season 2)

== Episodes ==
=== Season 1 ===
No. overall	No. in season	Title	Directed by	Written by	Original release date	Length
1	1	"State of the Union"	Adam Goldman	Adam Goldman & Sasha Winters	March 27, 2012	12:43
Following their ugly breakup, Mitchell and Jack navigate gay life in New York.
2	2	"Whiskey Dick"	Adam Goldman	Adam Goldman & Sasha Winters	May 8, 2012	18:51
Oona drags Mitchell to her ex-boyfriend Tucker's party, while Jack goes home with a sexy stranger.
3	3	"Moon River"	Adam Goldman	Story: Adam Goldman & Sasha Winters; Screenplay: Adam Goldman	June 17, 2012	22:38
Oona becomes reacquainted with Russell, and Jack freaks out over his intensifying relationship with Scruffy.
4	4	"Fun Party"	Adam Goldman	Story: Adam Goldman & Sasha Winters; Screenplay: Adam Goldman	July 29, 2012	18:42
Jack agrees to pick up a horribly drunk Mitchell from Oona's apartment.
5	5	"Fucking it Up"	Adam Goldman	Story: Adam Goldman & Sasha Winters; Screenplay: Adam Goldman	September 25, 2012	25:03
Flashback to the destruction of Jack and Mitchell's relationship.
6	6	"Significant Others"	Adam Goldman, Jay Gillespie & Sasha Winters	Story: Adam Goldman & Sasha Winters; Screenplay: Adam Goldman	November 19, 2012	28:05
Oona is unhappy with Russell. Jack and Mitchell take another step in repairing their friendship as Mitchell and Oona have a fight.
7	7	"Chanukah Special"	Adam Goldman	Story: Adam Goldman & Sasha Winters; Screenplay: Adam Goldman	April 1, 2013	43:30
An obstacle arises in Jack and Scruffy's relationship, and Oona runs into Drew and his new lover.

=== Season 2 ===
No. overall	No. in season	Title	Directed by	Written by	Original release date	Length
8	1	"WDR"	Adam Goldman & Jay Gillespie	Adam Goldman	March 30, 2016	25:32
With Oona now a published author, Mitchell is working as a "relationship expert", and Jack's romantic life is complicated.
9	2	"You're fine, you're fine, you're fine"	Adam Goldman & Jay Gillespie	Adam Goldman	April 6, 2016	30:47
Mitchell comes home to a shocking discovery. "Scruffy" Paul visits Jack.
10	3	"Golf thing"	Adam Goldman & Jay Gillespie	Adam Goldman	April 13, 2016	29:30
Mitchell asks Jack to pose as his boyfriend for a work function.
11	4	"Now that you are mine"	Adam Goldman & Jay Gillespie	Adam Goldman	April 20, 2016	28:34
Mitchell, Jack, and Oona have a triple date night.
12	5	"Gentlemen enjoy solitude"	Adam Goldman & Jay Gillespie	Adam Goldman	April 27, 2016	26:20
Mitchell's relationship with Rob hits a wall as Jack realizes his long distance relationship with Paul is not working. Oona makes an explosive decision about her career.
13	6	"I'll be the judge of that!"	Adam Goldman & Jay Gillespie	Adam Goldman	May 4, 2016	26:31
Paul surprises Jack with a visit.
14	7	"Cookie-wise"	Adam Goldman & Jay Gillespie	Story: Adam Goldman & Sasha Winters; Screenplay: Adam Goldman	December 24, 2016	17:02
Oona seeks out a depressed Mitchell. Jack and Paul take a big step.

== Production and release ==
The first season of The Outs was crowdfunded through two Kickstarter campaigns. Started after the first episode was complete, the first campaign had a goal of $1000 and received $1685. The second campaign, started after the first three episodes were released, had a goal of $8000 and achieved $22,339 with 503 backers. With the goal exceeded, producers produced a promised special seventh episode, later called the "Chanukah Special".

Set in Brooklyn, New York, the series was filmed predominantly in the Prospect Heights and Crown Heights areas of Brooklyn.

The first season of six episodes premiered via Vimeo on March 27, 2012. The Chanukah Special was released on April 1, 2013.

A second season of six episodes, funded by Vimeo, premiered on Vimeo On Demand on March 30, 2016. A special seventh episode titled "Cookie-wise" was released on December 24, 2016, available for streaming at no charge.

The full two seasons are available to stream free on the series' website.

== Awards and nominations ==
Award	Year	Category	Nominee(s)	Result	Ref.
4th Indie Soap Awards	2013	Best Web Series (Drama)	The Outs	Nominated	
4th Indie Soap Awards	2013	Best Actor (Drama)	Hunter Canning	Nominated	
4th Indie Soap Awards	2013	Best Supporting Actor (Drama)	Tommy Heleringer	Nominated	
4th Indie Soap Awards	2013	Best Writing (Drama)	Adam Goldman & Sasha Winters	Nominated	
4th Indie Soap Awards	2013	Best Directing (Drama)	Adam Goldman	Nominated	
4th Indie Soap Awards	2013	Best Ensemble (Drama)	The Outs	Nominated	
4th Indie Soap Awards	2013	Best Editing (All Shows)	Adam Goldman & Jay Gillespie	Nominated	
