= Beacon Hill (web series) =

- Season 1 main title
- Created by: Linda Hill; Jessica Hill
- Written by: Linda Hill; Jessica Hill; Skip Shea
- Directed by: Albert Alarr
- Starring: Alicia Minshew; Sarah Brown; Ron Raines; Scott Bryce; Crystal Chappell; John-Paul Lavoisier; Melissa Archer; Jessica Morris; Louise Sorel; Tina Sloan; Ricky Paull Goldin; Rebecca Mozo; Nadia Bjorlin; Marem Hassler
- Country of origin: United States
- Original language: English
- No. of seasons: 2
- No. of episodes: 18

Production
- Executive producers: Crystal Chappell; Christa Morris
- Producers: Ricky Paull Goldin; Linda Hill; Jessica Hill
- Cinematography: Kevin Perry
- Production companies: Bella Productions; Open Book Productions

Original release
- Release: March 5, 2014 – 2020

Beacon Hill (sometimes stylized Beacon Hill the Series) is a soap opera web series that premiered on March 5, 2014 at Beaconhilltheseries.com. Created by Linda Hill and Jessica Hill and executive produced by Crystal Chappell, season one stars Alicia Minshew and Sarah Brown as ex-lovers caught up in political and family drama in the affluent Boston neighborhood of Beacon Hill. Both roles were recast for season two with Nadia Bjorlin and Marem Hessler respectively.

The series was nominated for a 2015 Daytime Emmy Award for Outstanding New Approaches Drama Series, and both Minshew and Brown were nominated for Daytime Emmys for Outstanding Performer in a New Approaches Drama Series the same year. Brown won a 2015 Indie Series Award for Best Lead Actress (Drama) for her role, and Chappell was nominated for an Indie Series Award for Best Supporting Actress (Drama).

Season 2 aired in 2020 with 6 episodes.

== Plot ==
New York City reporter Sara Preston returns home to Beacon Hill to find her senator grandfather ailing, the rest of her family in shambles and her ex-girlfriend Kate Wesley caught up in political drama.

== Cast ==
- Alicia Minshew (season 1) and Nadia Bjorlin (season 2) as New York City reporter Sara Preston
- Sarah Brown (season 1) and Marem Hassler (season 2) as Massachusetts State Representative Katherine "Kate" Wesley
- Ron Raines as Senator William Preston, Sara's grandfather, a longtime Democratic senator for Massachusetts who will stop at nothing to get what he wants
- Scott Bryce as Senator Tom Wesley, Katherine's father, a conservative Republican senator
- Crystal Chappell as Claire Preston, Sara's mother, an alcoholic
- John-Paul Lavoisier as Eric Preston, Sara's brother
- Melissa Archer as Evelyn Preston, William's wife
- Jessica Morris as Diane Hamilton, Sara's partner, an actress
- Louise Sorel as coffeehouse owner Emily Tanner
- Tina Sloan as coffeehouse owner Louise Cassell
- Ricky Paull Goldin as Andrew Miller, Katherine's chief of staff
- Rebecca Mozo as Laura Parker, Katherine's best friend

== Production ==
Created by Linda Hill and Jessica Hill, Beacon Hill is executive produced by veteran actress and producer Chappell, with Co-Executive Producer Christa Morris, Supervising Producer Hillary B. Smith and producers Goldin, Hill and Hill. Albert Alarr directed season 1, with Kevin Perry as director of photography and Paul F. Antonelli as music supervisor.

== Awards ==
Beacon Hill was nominated for a 2015 Daytime Emmy Award for Outstanding New Approaches Drama Series, and both Minshew and Brown were nominated for Daytime Emmys for Outstanding Performer in a New Approaches Drama Series the same year. Brown won a 2015 Indie Series Award for Best Lead Actress (Drama) for her role, and Chappell was nominated for an Indie Series Award for Best Supporting Actress (Drama).
