= Changing Lanes =

2002 American drama thriller film

- Theatrical release poster
- Directed by: Roger Michell
- Screenplay by: Chap Taylor; Michael Tolkin
- Story by: Chap Taylor
- Produced by: Scott Rudin
- Starring: Ben Affleck; Samuel L. Jackson; Toni Collette; Sydney Pollack; William Hurt; Amanda Peet
- Cinematography: Salvatore Totino
- Edited by: Christopher Tellefsen
- Music by: David Arnold
- Distributed by: Paramount Pictures
- Release date: April 12, 2002
- Running time: 99 minutes
- Country: United States
- Language: English
- Budget: $45 million
- Box office: $94.9 million

Changing Lanes is a 2002 American legal thriller film directed by Roger Michell and starring Ben Affleck and Samuel L. Jackson. The film follows a successful, young Wall Street lawyer (Affleck) who accidentally crashes his car into a vehicle driven by a middle-aged, recovering alcoholic insurance salesman (Jackson). After the lawyer leaves the scene of the accident, the two men try to get back at each other, engaging in a variety of immoral and illegal actions that end up having a major impact on each man's life.

The film was released on April 12, 2002, in North America by Paramount Pictures. The film was favorably reviewed by critics, and it was a box office success, earning almost $95 million against a $45 million budget. Writers Chap Taylor and Michael Tolkin were nominated for the WAFCA Award for Best Original Screenplay for their work. It was later remade in Hindi as Taxi No. 9211.

== Plot ==
In New York City, two men are rushing to court. One, a middle-aged insurance salesman named Doyle Gipson, a recovering alcoholic attending Alcoholics Anonymous meetings to stay sober, is en route to a hearing to argue for joint custody of his sons with his estranged wife. The other, a successful young Wall Street attorney named Gavin Banek, is rushing to file a power of appointment document to prove a dead man signed his foundation over to Banek's law firm. Banek is distracted while driving on the FDR Drive and his car collides with Gipson's. Banek tries to brush Gipson off with a blank check, rather than exchanging insurance information, thereby disobeying the law. Gipson refuses to accept the check and voices his desire to "do this right", but Banek, whose car is still drivable, insists upon leaving immediately. He leaves Gipson stranded, telling him, "better luck next time." After arriving to the court late, Gipson learns that the judge ruled against him in his absence, giving sole custody of the boys to Gipson's wife and allowing her to proceed with a plan to move to Oregon, never knowing that Gipson was about to buy a house locally and give it to his wife and children as part of his effort to make joint custody workable for everyone.

When Banek gets to court, he realizes that he dropped the crucial power of appointment file at the scene of the accident, and the judge gives him until the end of the day to retrieve it. Gipson, who scooped up the file, is torn, and initially refuses to return the file. Banek, who is desperate to get his papers back, goes to a "fixer", a shady computer hacker, and gets him to switch off Gipson's credit, destroying Gipson's chance for a home loan to keep his family together. Gipson is distraught when he finds out his credit has been ruined and he comes close to drinking again. Determined to get back at Banek, Gipson removes several lug nuts from one of Banek's wheels, and Banek suffers some minor injuries after his car crashes on the highway. An infuriated Banek goes to the elementary school of Gipson's children and tells school officials that Gipson plans to kidnap the boys, so Gipson is arrested and jailed. His enraged wife declares her intention to move forward with taking their sons to Oregon and says that Gipson will never see them again.

Both men, shaken by the consequences of their actions, start to reconsider their desire for vengeance and try to find a way out. Although it appears unlikely that either man will achieve what he had hoped, both resolve to let go and do what is right, and the two men apologize to each other. Gipson returns the file containing the power of appointment, which Banek knows will discredit illegal forgeries submitted earlier by his firm, and he uses it to blackmail his boss to conduct business honestly and get approval to represent Gipson pro bono to resolve his legal troubles. Banek also visits Gipson's wife, asking her to "give me five minutes." The next day, Gipson is walking and notices his wife and sons standing across the street, smiling at him.

== Cast ==
- Ben Affleck as Gavin Banek
- Samuel L. Jackson as Doyle Gipson
- Kim Staunton as Valerie Gipson
- Toni Collette as Michelle
- Sydney Pollack as Stephen Delano
- Tina Sloan as Mrs. Delano
- Richard Jenkins as Walter Arnell
- Akil Walker as Stephen Gipson
- Cole Hawkins as Danny Gipson
- Ileen Getz as Ellen
- Jennifer Dundas Lowe as Mina Dunne
- Matt Malloy as Ron Cabot
- Amanda Peet as Cynthia Banek
- Bruce Altman as Terry Kaufman
- Joe Grifasi as Judge Cosell
- Angela Goethals as Sarah Windsor
- Kevin Sussman as Tyler Cohen
- William Hurt as Sponsor
- John Benjamin Hickey as Carlyle
- Michael Patrick McGrath as Seavers
- Dylan Baker as Finch
- Jordan Gelber as Priest
- Olga Merediz as Mrs. Miller
- Jayne Houdyshell as Miss Tetley

== Reception ==
=== Box office ===
The film was a box office success, with a budget of $45,000,000, it grossed $66,818,548 in the United States and $28,117,216 internationally, for a total gross of $94,935,764.

=== Critical response ===
Review aggregation website Rotten Tomatoes gives the film an approval rating of 77% based on 151 reviews, with an average rating of 7/10. The site's critics consensus states: "Though some may find its conclusion unsatisfying, Changing Lanes is a tense, well-crafted exploration of meaty ethical dilemmas." Metacritic assigned the film a weighted average score of 69 out of 100, based on 36 critics, indicating "generally favorable" reviews. Audiences polled by CinemaScore gave the film an average grade of "B−" on an A+ to F scale.

Roger Ebert of Chicago Sun-Times praised the film, calling it one of the year's best.
