= Elizabeth Webster =

English actress

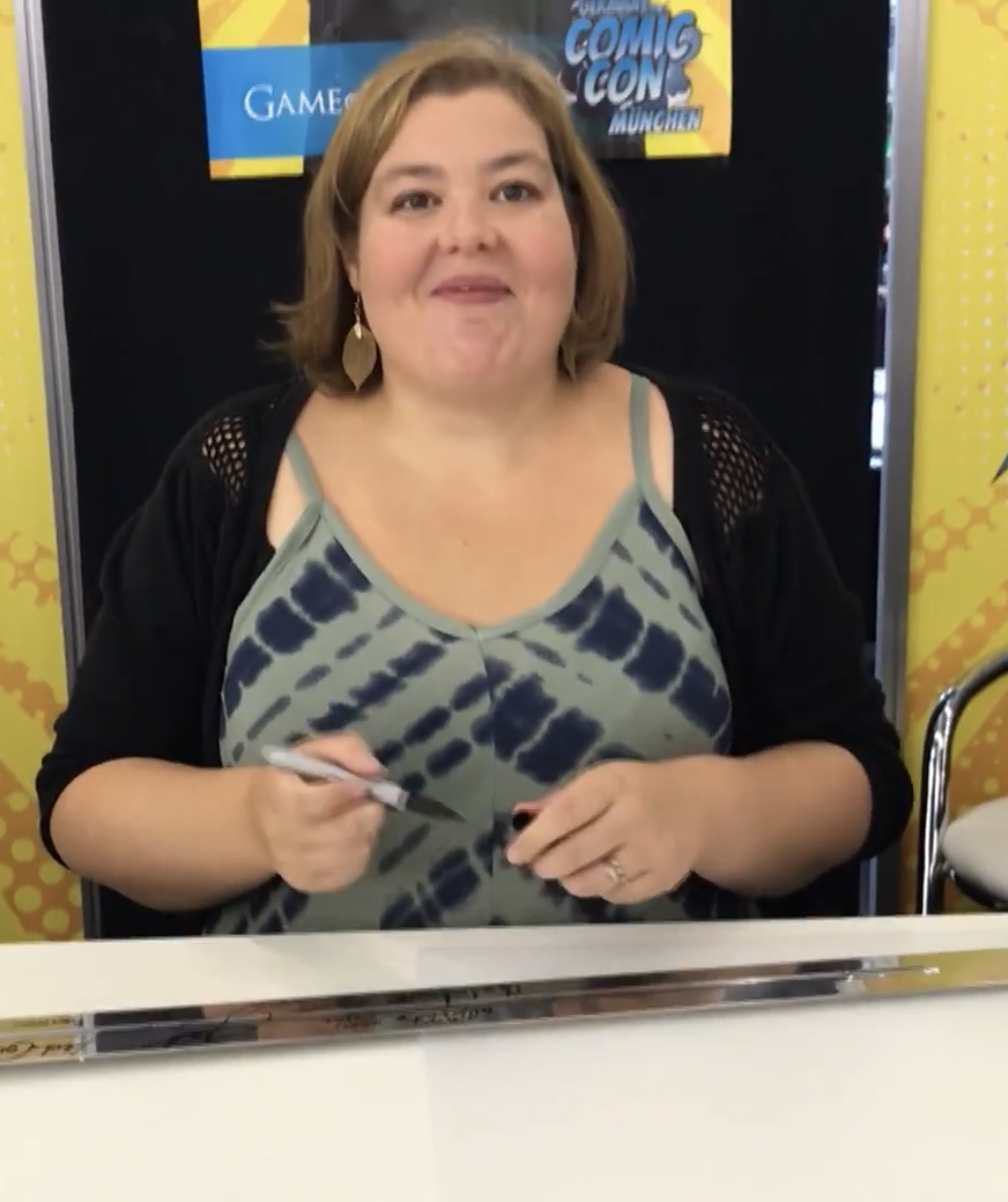
- Webster at the 2018 German Comic Con Munich
- Occupation: Actress
- Years active: 2012–present

Elizabeth Webster is an English actress and trade union activist. She has portrayed the part of Walda Bolton in the HBO series Game of Thrones in season 4, season 5 and season 6.

== Filmography ==
=== Film ===
Year	Title	Role	Notes
2012	Cheerful Weather for the Wedding	Betty	
2012	Cockneys vs Zombies	Natasha	
2013	Frequencies	Mrs. Cook	
2015	Pubmonkey	Fat Mavis	
2015	Shoot Me. Kiss Me. Cut!	Ester	
2017	Let Me Go	Dani	

=== Television ===
Year	Title	Role	Notes
2012	Call the Midwife	Mrs. Foster	
2012	The Bloody Mary Show	Viscera	
2013	The Spa	Emma	
2014	Catherine Tate's Nan	Gypsy lady	TV special
2014–2016	Game of Thrones	Walda Bolton	5 episodes (Season 4-6)
2019	Doctors	Ms. Rooney	
