= Sarah Joy Brown =

American actress

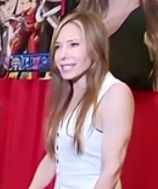
- Brown in 2025
- Other name: Sarah Brown
- Occupations: Film, television actress
- Years active: 1994–present
- Partner: Shuki Levy (former)
- Website: www.sarahbrown.net

Sarah Joy Brown, sometimes credited simply as Sarah Brown, is an American actress. She is perhaps best known for originating the role of Carly Corinthos on the American daytime drama General Hospital from 1996 to 2001. For the role, she won three Daytime Emmy Awards. In 2008, she returned to General Hospital in a different role, Claudia Zacchara. She exited General Hospital once again in 2009 and began appearing on The Bold and the Beautiful in the newly created role of Aggie Jones.

Brown appeared as Madison James on Days of Our Lives from October 2011 until the character's death in August 2012.

== Career ==
Brown's acting career began at the age of 19, when she was cast as Kaitlin Star on Saban's syndicated action adventure science fantasy series VR Troopers.

In 1996, she made a guest appearance in a 3-part episode of Power Rangers Zeo playing Heather Thompson, a girl who has a crush on the Red Ranger's secret identity, Tommy Oliver, but it never led anywhere. An article in FOX Kids Magazine claimed a member of the VR Troopers cast would be quitting the series to become a part of the Power Rangers cast; however, the aforementioned Zeo three-parter and Brad Hawkins voicing the Gold Ranger prior to the return of Austin St. John as Jason Lee Scott is the closest anything like this ever came to happening.

In April 1996, Brown originated the role Carly Corinthos on the American ABC soap opera General Hospital.

Brown "quickly became an overnight sensation" and received three Daytime Emmy Awards for her portrayal of Carly. She won for Outstanding Younger Actress in 1997 and 1998, was nominated in 1999, and won again for Outstanding Supporting Actress in 2000.

In 2010, she received her first Daytime Emmy nomination in the Lead Actress category for her work as Claudia Zacchara. Brown appeared on the cover of Soap Opera Digest 19 times during her run in the role, and won two Soap Opera Digest Awards in 1998 (Younger Lead Actress) and 2000 (Favorite Actress). She departed the series in April 2001.

After leaving General Hospital, Brown guest-starred on several television series, including Crossing Jordan, Strong Medicine and Without a Trace. She returned to daytime in the role of Julia Morrisey Larrabee on As the World Turns from August 2004 to March 2005, in which she appeared in 109 episodes. In 2004, Brown played the lead role of Kate Vignatti in the fact-based television movie The Perfect Husband: The Laci Peterson Story. She became a regular on the CBS crime drama Cold Case in the fall of 2005 but was let go after only a few months (she appeared in five episodes) with the series. In 2006, she starred in her first feature film, the comedy, Big Momma's House 2 and appeared in an episode of Monk the same year. Brown was also seen in the third season episode 12 of The Closer and on a 2007 episode of the Fox police drama K-Ville.

Brown returned to General Hospital on January 31, 2008, in the role of Claudia Zacchara. She announced on her Twitter September 16, 2009 that she would be leaving General Hospital in mid October 2009. Brown also announced on her Twitter account that she would be making an appearance on ABC's Castle.

In 2011, she had a supporting role in a Tracy J Trost film entitled The Lamp (All Things are Possible If You Just Believe). It is based on a novel by Jim Stovall. In July 2011, numerous soap outlets confirmed that Brown would join the cast of Days of Our Lives as Madison James, a successful business woman. Her first appearance was October 4, 2011. In April 2012, it was announced that Brown had been let go from the series along with many other cast members.

In 2014, Brown played Massachusetts State Representative Katherine "Kate" Wesley in the soap opera web series Beacon Hill. She was nominated for a 2015 Daytime Emmy Award for Outstanding Performer in a New Approaches Drama Series, and won a 2015 Indie Series Award for Best Lead Actress (Drama) for the role.

== Personal life ==
Brown is a practicing convert to Judaism. She has been diagnosed with Coeliac disease.

== Filmography ==
=== Film ===
Year	Title	Role	Notes
2005	Heart of the Beholder	Diane Howard	
2006	Big Momma's House 2	Constance Stone	
2011	The Lamp	Deb	
2015	Monster Hunters USA and Day Care Center	Zara Daily	Short

=== Television ===
Year	Title	Role	Notes
1994–1996	VR Troopers	Kaitlin Star	Main role
1996	Power Rangers Zeo	Heather Thompson	Episodes: "There's No Business Like Snow Business: Parts 1–3"
1996–2001, 2014	General Hospital	Carly Corinthos	Regular role
1997	Hostile Force	Rachel	Television film
2001	Mysterious Ways	Emma Shepard	Episodes: "Child of Wonder", "29", "Love's Divine"
2002	Birds of Prey	Lucy	Episode: "Primal Scream"
2003	For the People	Zoe Constantine	Episode: "Power Play"
2003	The Lyon's Den	Amanda Beacon Manning	Episode: "Hubris"
2003	10-8: Officers on Duty	Astrid Fonseca	Episodes: "Brothers in Arms", "Badlands"
2003	Karen Sisco	Harmony	Episode: "Nostalgia"
2003, 2005	Without a Trace	Tess Balkin, Katherine Michaels	Episodes: "Kam Li", "John Michaels"
2004	The Perfect Husband: The Laci Peterson Story	Kate Vignatti	Television film
2004	Crossing Jordan	Susan Mayo	Episode: "Dead or Alive"
2004	Dragnet	Nicole Harrison	Episode: "Frame of Mind"
2004	Strong Medicine	Perry	Episode: "Touched by an Idol"
2004–2005	As the World Turns	Julia Morrisey Larrabee	Regular role
2005	Cold Case	Josie Sutton	Recurring role (season 3)
2006	Monk	Mandy Bronson	Episode: "Mr. Monk and the Leper"
2007	The Closer	Kristen Shafer	Episodes: "Til Death Do Us Part: Parts 1 & 2"
2007	It Was One of Us	Emily Winstead	Television film
2007	K-Ville	Eileen McGillis	Episode: "Flood, Wind and Fire"
2007	Company Man	Laura Brooks	Television film
2007	A.M.P.E.D.	Katherine Cabrera	Television film
2008–2009	General Hospital	Claudia Zacchara	Regular role
2009–2011	The Bold and the Beautiful	Aggie Jones	Regular role
2010	Castle	Amanda Livingston	Episode: "The Third Man"
2011–2012	Days of Our Lives	Madison James	Regular role
2012	CSI: Crime Scene Investigation	Maria Louie	Episode: "CSI on Fire"
2014	Beacon Hill	Katherine Wesley	Main role (season 1)
2016	Youthful Daze	Aunt Kathy	TV series
2018	Code Black	Elizabeth Harris	Episode: "Cabin Pressure"

=== Video games ===
Year	Title	Role	Notes
2005	Predator: Concrete Jungle	Scarface	Voice

== See also ==
- List of people diagnosed with coeliac disease

First	Carly Corinthos (role); 1996–2001	Succeeded by Tamara Braun
