= The Bloody Mary Show =

British comedy horror web series

- Genre: Comedy
- Created by: Darren Chadwick-Hussein
- Starring: Hollie Taylor; Elizabeth Webster; Thomas Coombes
- Composer: Christopher Skipper
- Country of origin: United Kingdom
- Original language: English
- No. of seasons: 1
- No. of episodes: 7 (list of episodes)

Production
- Producer: Darren Chadwick-Hussein
- Production locations: London, United Kingdom
- Running time: 5–10 minutes

Original release
- Network: YouTube; Blip
- Release: 7 September 2012 – 8 January 2013

The Bloody Mary Show is a British comedy web series produced and written by director Darren Chadwick-Hussein. The series is broadcast on the internet and premiered on 7 September 2012. So far, seven episodes of season one have been made, with season two under development. The show can be found distributed across the web including on Blip and YouTube. The Bloody Mary Show follows a group of unconventional ghouls, who can be summoned from the afterlife by the living or are sent to haunt them. The show focuses on main character Bloody Mary and her friends, Abdabs, Malevolent and Viscera, as they spend their days haunting the living, sharing their experiences and drinking at an underworld bar called Hemingway's, which was filmed in the oldest pub on the River Thames, The Mayflower.

== History ==
The Bloody Mary Show was inspired and written and produced by Darren Chadwick-Hussein after suffering from an episode of sleep paralysis. In an interview he stated "It is a terrifying experience that usually features hallucinations, the 'Old Hag syndrome'. In order to deal with the experience I tried to humanise what I had seen and eventually, through twelve months of re-writes, it became the character of Viscera." The first season was solely funded through a crowdfunder campaign. In 2012 The Bloody Mary Show was nominated for nine awards at the annual Indie Soap Awards. The Bloody Mary show has also won two awards including 'Best Lead Actress' (Hollie Taylor) and 'Best Theme Song' at LA Web Fest 2013 . The show also won Best Make up, which was awarded to Jamey-Leigh Weber and Julia Coleman.

== Plot ==
The plot follows Bloody Mary played by Hollie Taylor, who is based on the American legendary ghost 'Bloody Mary' who when summoned by saying her name three times, appears in the mirror to reveal the future, although in the show the Bloody Mary character is less interested in archetypal ghostly haunting and more interested in helping people. Bloody Mary becomes involved with a 'being' (a living person) called Chris, who is a heavy drinker and seemingly depressed and to make matters worse for Bloody Mary, getting involved with a being is forbidden and leads to complications for all the characters.
