= Agnes Jones (The Bold and the Beautiful) =

Aggie Jones
- The Bold and the Beautiful character
- Portrayed by: Sarah Joy Brown
- Duration: 2009–2011
- First appearance: November 5, 2009
- Last appearance: February 8, 2011
- Created by: Bradley Bell
In-universe information
- Other names: Sandy Sommers
- Occupation: Assistant at Jackie M Designs
- Brothers: Oliver Jones
- Grandfathers: Whipple Jones
- Uncles: Whipple Jones Jr.
- Aunts: Joy Jones
- First cousins: Whipple Jones III

Agnes Jones is a fictional character from the CBS Daytime soap opera The Bold and the Beautiful. The character was portrayed by daytime veteran Sarah Joy Brown. She made her debut on The Bold and the Beautiful a day after she vacated her role as Claudia Zacchara on the ABC Daytime General Hospital. Brown debuted on November 5, 2009, and vacated the role on February 8, 2011, after dropping off the canvas.

== Casting ==
Sarah Joy Brown started playing the role immediately after leaving General Hospital. Brown remained with The Bold and the Beautiful on contract status until February 2011, when she was dropped to recurring. However, she never appeared on the soap again, and later that year she joined the cast of another American soap opera, Days of Our Lives.

== Development ==
The character was first introduced as Sandy Sommers; however, it is later revealed that this is an alias and that her true name is Agnes Jones, as she had been traumatised from being raped in her backstory and wanted a new identity. When the character was first introduced to Brown by head writer Bradley Bell, Brown felt very strongly about the role. She was excited to play the character. In two different interviews with Brown, she describes the character: "as someone who is recovering from real trauma, "[Sandy] is not really herself when the audience first meets her. She's on a journey, sort of trying to find her bearings. And, she's a bit of a mess when she [first arrives]." She added that Sandy is "very timid to me, and even has food delivered to her trailer where the grass does not grow. She is not trying to get anywhere with her life and that is what is really sad." Brown expressed her excitement over playing the role and looked forward to the challenges of playing this character and really expressing the tragedy and trauma that the character has experienced in a new light, explaining, "It is a hard material to look at, to think about, to work on, to mull over and digest, and to try to find beauty in. I'm totally loving the job. I really believe in what I'm doing."

In 2010, Agnes's backstory is explored when she reveals that she was raped five years prior and she is able to identify her rapist. Agnes helps to save Hope Logan (Kim Matula) from being another victim of her rapist and she then confronts him on the roof, where she kicks him in his genital after he taunts her and pushes her to the floor.

In 2010, Aggie develops a romantic attraction towards Nick Marone (Jack Wagner), who is married to Bridget Forrester (Ashley Jones). Brown did not see Aggie's attraction as an "obsession" but rather as a "deep love for someone she appreciates", adding, "I think she has a really healthy attraction to him. Of course, he is a married man so I guess it's not that healthy but it's human. She has been through a huge ordeal and this man stepped up and cared for her. She has respect for Nick, and I think Agnes would have let bygones be bygones if she had not found out about Bridget and [her cheating with] Owen". Brown did not think that Aggie would be trying to get with Nick if she thought that Bridget was good enough for him.

== Storylines ==
Agnes Jones is introduced as a potential surrogate for Nick and Bridget Marone. In an attempt to make herself more marketable to potential couples, Aggie, who had changed her name to Sandy Sommers, she lied on her surrogate profile. When looking over the profile, Bridget took a liking to it and considered Aggie a potential surrogate. Aggie is first seen as mysterious, a bit unkempt and saddened in her mobile home. Still, she immediately livens up after receiving a call from Bridget asking her for a meeting to discuss the potential surrogacy. She sets up a meeting with Bridget and dyes her hair from dark brown to blonde before going to the meeting with Nick and Bridget. After the meeting, Aggie was selected to be their surrogate.

Although Aggie presented herself as the perfect candidate and promised the Marones that she was living a healthy lifestyle, she did not take too well to all of the guidelines that came with becoming a surrogate for instance the healthy eating that is involved and opted to eat junk food. Aggie took a liking to Bridget but pulled away from Nick, seemingly uncomfortable around men. She is implanted with Nick and Bridget's embryo and clings excitedly to Bridget during the procedure but does not want Nick in the room. Later on in Aggie's room, she encounters Whipple Jones III, and he immediately recognizes her as his cousin Agnes Jones. At first, she denies it, but as Whip begins talking about how close they used to be, she eventually reveals the truth and tells him that she changed her name to Sandy for certain reasons. When Agnes arrives with Nick and Bridget at the Adam and Eve photo shoot at Jackie M Designs, she is introduced as their surrogate. She later makes it clear to Whip that she does not want Nick and Bridget to know that they are cousins not to complicate the situation. Aggie's mysterious past begins to appear when she gets upset by the photo shoot and has to leave the room. Later on the elevator she breaks down and cries imagining cameras flashing all around her. Aggie is having flashbacks of a certain time in her life when things were different.

Aggie seems haunted by the photo shoot as she can't seem to stop thinking about the camera flashes and as Whip visits her to check on her, he reveals that she used to love that kind of stuff. He asks her what happened but she blows him off, and even as he presses the issue knowing something is wrong she still would not reveal what happened to her. Nick and Bridget are thrilled when Agnes is confirmed to be pregnant but she is uncomfortable. As they try to show their appreciation, Aggie allows Bridget but yet again backs away from Nick. Nick begins to notice Aggie's apparent dislike of him, but Bridget simply brushes it off. Nick later goes to Aggie's place wanting to discuss her behavior and discovers mail addressed to Agnes Jones and junk food in the cupboards. He quickly realizes that she is not all she claimed to be and wonders why she has not been truthful. She reveals that she hadn't been exactly truthful on her profile but promises to give Nick and Bridget a healthy baby. She reveals that the person she described on her profile was who she used to be and reminded herself of Bridget. She also tells him she wants to experience child birth but it would never happen for her, not with a man, but she refuses to disclose any more information.

Bridget and Agnes bond and become friends, going to yoga classes together. They later meet Bridget's mom Brooke Logan (Katherine Kelly Lang) and Brooke notices how Aggie seems afraid of Nick. After a day out with the Marones, Aggie freaks out when she returns home to find the door already open. It turns out it was just her cousin Whip there to fix her broken lights. Nick who had driven her home comes inside worried to find the lights still not on and sees Whip who soon after leaves. He immediately wondered what was going on and Aggie reluctantly admits that she & Whip are cousins. He demands to know her story knowing that whatever she is hiding was stressful and could cause harm to the baby. She finally decides to be honest with him and reveals that she had been date raped after leaving a bar with a photographer who was going to take head shots of her and doing tequila shots at an after party afterward. Her rape is revealed as being the root of her distrust and fear of men. Aggie assures Nick that she had all of her tests done and is physically clean but swears Nick to secrecy not wanting Bridget to know about her ordeal and worry. He agrees not to tell her and she thanks him feeling like a weight had been lifted off her shoulder and glad to have shared that information with someone. She and Nick start becoming friends.

The next day in Nick's office Aggie overhears Nick disclosing her secret to Brooke. She confronts him wondering how he could have betrayed her trust. He assures her that he did not tell Bridget, but he does think she needs some help. Aggie then talks with Brooke about her ordeal as Brooke comforts her and gives her some advice on how to get on with her life after such a tragic ordeal. After their talk, Nick, Bridget and Stephanie Forrester come in offering Aggie the position as Stephanie's assistant at Jackie M Designs and she happily accepts the position. She later apologizes to Nick and tells him that she now trusts him and sees him differently as Brooke has helped her gain a new perspective.

Bridget becomes infuriated after learning that Nick and Aggie have gone from being friends to having an emotional affair and that she's been leaning on her husband telling her about her feelings, her rape and crying to him on a regular basis and that Nick has been hiding her past about behind her back. Bridget considers it a betrayal since he had done the same thing with her aunt Katie and had gotten her pregnant but due to the loss of the baby they were able to reconcile. Bridget starts to harass Aggie, angrily reminding her that Nick is her husband and starts to ruthlessly monitor her taking of the prenatal vitamins and sticking to her vegetarian schedule telling her once she has the baby she wants her to get the "hell out of their lives."

Bridget and Aggie get into an argument after Nick invites Aggie to dinner to make amends between the once friends and due to the argument Aggie falls down two of the stairs and collapses as Bridget commence to walk up the stairs. However, Bridget becomes concerned for the baby after seeing her on the floor and started to hysterically cry as Nick and her try to rush Aggie to the hospital.

The baby dies and Bridget blames Nick for the situation which led to the argument and runs to Owen and cries hysterically and cries and lights candles for her dead child. Owen comforts her and hugs her and he talks about how he wants kids also but Jackie doesn't want them. Bridget tells him she's going to leave him and Owen tells her she's just upset now and she needs to go back home and talk to Nick which she refuses to do. She ends up kissing him and they end up having sex. Aggie is now trying to win over Nick after finding out that Bridget cheated on him with Owen Knight. She revealed to him that his wife cheated on him the day she (Aggie) lost the baby and she (Bridget) had sex with Owen, his step-father. Nick is angered & disgusted by this revelation. Aggie feels horrible for Nick.

Nick leaves Bridget and he becomes intimate with Agnes, and they later confess their love for each other. Agnes is thrilled when Nick fires Bridget, Owen and Jackie from Jackie M Designs and feels as though Nick is all her own. However, she's unaware her new friend Amber Moore, who Nick has chosen to be the new head designer and face of Jackie M, is making her move on Nick. To show her appreciation and comfort him in his sadness after firing Bridget, Amber gives Nick a deep and lingering kiss. She apologizes and tells him she just got carried away. Whip overhears her apology and warns her that if she hurts Aggie, she'll have him to deal with.

Amber sends Aggie off on a fruitless mini-business trip and attempts to seduce Nick but he rejects her advances. She attempts to seduce him again while in the office by making bold flirtatious gestures towards him which Aggie catches. Agnes confronts Amber and tells her to stay away from Nick, and is pleased to find out that she has been fired. Agnes supports Nick when he finds out that he has a lung infection. Nick and Agnes later split up.
