= Paul Norman (director) =

American former pornographic director (born 1956)

- Born: Paul Apstein; 1956
- Spouse(s): Tori Welles (1990-1994); Celeste (1995-1996)
- Children: 3

Paul Norman (born Paul Apstein, 1956) is an American former pornographic director who directed approximately 134 films from 1986 to 1999.

== Career ==
Norman started his career making bisexual pornography. One of his earliest works in this genre is his Bi and Beyond series, which debuted in 1988. He later ventured towards establishing himself as a director of strictly straight pornography in the early 1990s. Norman was inducted into the AVN Hall of Fame in 1998.

== Personal life ==
He married fellow pornographic actress Tori Welles in 1990, before divorcing in 1994. They had two sons, Nicolas and Joshua. He was a friend of the late pornographic director Fred J. Lincoln. Norman was later married to fellow pornographic actress Celeste 1995–1996. The relationship produced one child.

== Awards ==
- 1990 AVN Award - Best Director: Bisexual Video (Bi and Beyond III)
- 1991 AVN Award - Best Director: Bisexual Video (Bi and Beyond IV)
- 1998 AVN Hall of Fame inductee.
