= Andrea Evans =

American actress (1957–2023)

- Evans in a promotional photo for One Life to Live
- Born: Andrea Lynn Evans; June 18, 1957; Aurora, Illinois, U.S.
- Died: July 9, 2023 (aged 66); Pasadena, California, U.S.
- Occupation: Actress
- Years active: 1978–2020
- Notable work: One Life to Live; The Young and the Restless; The Bold and the Beautiful; Passions
- Spouses: Wayne Massey (m. 1981–1983) Stephen Rodriguez (m. 1998)
- Children: 1

Andrea Lynn Evans (June 18, 1957 – July 9, 2023) was an American actress. She was most recognized for her portrayal of Tina Lord on the ABC soap opera One Life to Live, a role she played from 1978 to 1981 and from 1985 to 1990, returning in 2008 and 2011. Evans also appeared on the soap operas The Young and the Restless as Patty Williams, The Bold and the Beautiful as Tawny Moore and Passions as Rebecca Hotchkiss.

== Career ==
Evans was born in Aurora, Illinois, on June 18, 1957. As a child, Evans appeared in beauty pageants, and later regional theater and commercials. She graduated early from high school and attended the University of Illinois at Urbana-Champaign. While there Evans was cast as an extra in the 1978 Brian De Palma film The Fury, and the same year in the miniseries The Awakening Land. Casting director Mary Jo Slater soon got Evans the role of Tina Clayton on the ABC daytime soap opera One Life to Live, where she stayed until 1981. Evans then went on to portray Patty Williams, Paul Williams' little sister and Jack Abbott's wife, on The Young and the Restless from 1983 to 1984.

Evans returned to One Life to Live in 1985, in a storyline credited with putting the series "back on course" and ultimately bringing Tina to her height of popularity. She was nominated for a Daytime Emmy Award in 1988 for Outstanding Ingenue for One Life to Live, and has appeared on the cover of Soap Opera Digest five times, every year from 1986 to 1990. People magazine called her "Daytime's Diva of Dirt" in 1985.

In January 1990, Evans abruptly quit One Life to Live and dropped out of public view for nearly a decade. Years later, she revealed that she had left to escape a persistent stalker who had gone as far as breaking into the ABC studios in New York City, intent on killing her. Co-star Fiona Hutchison tried to pry the stalker off Evans along with ABC security. At the time, the stalker incident had been played down heavily in the press. In a 2005 episode of the CBS News show 48 Hours, Evans discussed working with Rebecca Schaeffer, who played Annie Barnes on One Life to Live for six months in 1985, and how it was Schaeffer's murder by her own stalker in July 1989 that finally led Evans to decide to leave One Life to Live. She taped her last scenes in December 1989, and last aired January 18, 1990.

Evans made two feature films during the 1990s, performing a small part in A Low Down Dirty Shame in 1994 and a major role in Ice Cream Man in 1995. In 1999, Evans returned to television, appearing as Amber Moore's "trashy" mother Tawny on The Bold and the Beautiful until 2000. That year she stepped into the role of Rebecca Hotchkiss Crane on the NBC soap opera Passions (replacing Maureen McCormick, whose ten-episode stint had ended), where she would stay until the series' final episode. Evans' longtime recurring status on Passions fueled rumors for years of her return to her One Life to Live role of Tina.

When NBC canceled Passions, it was announced in July 2007 that she would stay with the series for its continued run on DirecTV. Passions finished taping in March 2008, though new episodes were broadcast on DirecTV through August 2008.

In the June 26, 2007 issue of Soap Opera Digest, Evans was asked what her favorite role was besides her current one on Passions; she answered "That's an easy one ... Tina Lord Roberts on One Life to Live because in every actor's life, you hope for a role that becomes bigger than yourself and for me, Tina was that role." ABC announced in April 2008 that Evans would soon return as Tina; she reappeared onscreen on June 11, 2008. Executive Producer Frank Valentini noted, "Even though Andrea has not appeared on OLTL since 1990, she has remained among the most requested characters to return to the show ... I welcome her home to OLTL and to the role where she made an indelible mark on our audience." Evans' departure from the series was announced on November 5, 2008. Evans and ABC noted that the actress' return was always set to be short-term, as her "life, family and home" are in California while One Life to Live taped in New York City. Valentini continued in a statement, "The character of Tina is a very important part of the OLTL canvas ... [If] there is an opportunity to have her — Tina and Andrea — return at a future date, the show would be happy to explore it." Evans' last appearance was on November 25, 2008.

On April 6, 2010, TVGuide.com announced that Evans would be returning to The Young and the Restless, not as Patty Williams, but as Evans' The Bold and the Beautiful character Tawny. The one-episode stint aired on May 12, 2010. On November 8 of the same year, it was announced that Evans would be temporarily returning to The Bold and the Beautiful as Tawny. While still appearing in recurring capacity on B&B, Evans reprised the role of Tina on OLTL on September 27, 2011, as the series was ending its run. In the story, her character Tina was reunited with her 1980s supercouple partner, Cord Roberts, played by John Loprieno. Her short-term run ended as Cord and Tina remarried on November 15, 2011.

In 2012, Evans had a supporting role in the Joey Lawrence film Hit List. In August 2013, Evans was cast as Vivian Price in the fourth season of the web series DeVanity, which was streamed in 2014. She was nominated for a 2015 Daytime Emmy Award for Outstanding Performer in a New Approaches Drama Series for her performance, and won a 2015 Indie Series Award for Best Guest Actress in a Drama for the role.

Evans was executive producer of the documentary Rocking the Couch, released in 2018. She portrayed the recurring role of Patty Walker on the web series The Bay from 2017 to 2020.

== Personal life and death ==
Evans was briefly married to One Life to Live co-star Wayne Massey (who played Tina's love interest Johnny Drummond) in 1981. Evans married Los Angeles attorney Stephen Rodriguez on January 10, 1998; the couple adopted a daughter in 2004.

Evans died of breast cancer at her home in Pasadena, California, on July 9, 2023, at the age of 66.

== Filmography ==
Year	Title	Role	Notes
1978	The Awakening Land	Fay Morrison Wheeler	Miniseries; Episode: "Part III: The Town"
1978–1981, 1985–1990, 2008, 2011	One Life to Live	Tina Lord	July 1978 – December 1981; February 1985 – January 1990; June–November 2008; September–November 2011; In 1985, Evans also portrayed a younger version of her character's mother, Irene Manning, in flashbacks.
1982	CHiPs	Julie	Episode: "Meet the New Guy" (as Andrea Evans Massey)
1983–1984	The Young and the Restless	Patty Williams	July 1983 – October 1984
1984	Arch of Triumph	Nurse Eugenie	TV movie
1985	Jenny's War	Receptionist	Miniseries
1985	Florence Nightingale	Mrs. Brent	TV movie
1990	Capital News	Andrea Schaffer	Episode: "Finished? Not Dunne"
1994	A Low Down Dirty Shame	Denise	Feature film
1995	Ice Cream Man	Wanda	Feature film
1999–2000, 2010–2011	The Bold and the Beautiful	Tawny Moore	March 1999 – June 2000; December 2010 – June 2011
2000–2008	Passions	Rebecca Hotchkiss	September 2000 – August 2008
2010	The Young and the Restless	Tawny Moore	May 12, 2010 (1 episode)
2012	Hit List	Diane Murphy	Feature film
2012	Imaginary Friend	Angela	TV movie
2014	DeVanity	Vivian Price	Web series
2017–2020	The Bay	Patty Walker	Web series
