= Noirhouse =

- Directed by: Shaun Wilson
- Starring: Melanie Irons, Nathan Spencer, Mick Davies
- Country of origin: Australia
- Original language: English
- No. of seasons: 2
- No. of episodes: 9

Production
- Producer: Fiona McConaghy
- Production location: Hobart

Original release
- Network: ABC iView
- Release: present

Noirhouse is an Australian dark comedy indie web series, starring Melanie Irons, Nathan Spencer and Mick Davies. It plays on film-noir archetypes, featuring three main characters - a shady detective, femme fatale and Russian mobster. It premiered in September 2013 with an early screening at the Peacock Threater in Hobart, before beginning broadcast on its own website for a 3 episode first series. It was picked up by the Australian Broadcasting Corporation for a six episode second season to be released on its iView broadcasting platform, to begin running in November 2014. It was originally funded by Screen Tasmania and Screen Australia.

== Awards ==
Year	Award	Category	Result
2014	TO WebFest	Outstanding Achievement in Horror	Won
2014	Miami Web Fest	Best Actor (Nathan Spencer)	Nominated
2014	Indie Series Awards	Best Web Series - Comedy	Nominated
2014	Indie Series Awards	Best Ensemble - Comedy	Nominated
2014	Indie Series Awards	Best Makeup (Liz Goulding)	Nominated
2014	Indie Series Awards	Best Costume Design (Liz Goulding)	Nominated
2014	Australian WebStream Awards	Best Writing (Tim Logan)	Won
2014	Australian WebStream Awards	Best Female Performance (Melanie Irons)	Won
2014	Australian WebStream Awards	Best Ensemble Cast	Won
2014	Australian WebStream Awards	Best Makeup and Hair (Liz Goulding)	Won
2014	Australian WebStream Awards	Best Fashion and Costume Design (Liz Goulding)	Won
2014	Australian WebStream Awards	Best Production Design	Won
2014	Australian WebStream Awards	Best Visual Effects	Won
2014	Melbourne WebFest Awards	Best Director (Shaun Wilson)	Won
2014	Rome Web Awards	Best Web Series	Nominated
2014	Rome Web Awards	Best Comedy	Nominated
2014	Rome Web Awards	Best Cinematography	Nominated
2014	Rome Web Awards	Best Sexy Actress (Melanie Irons)	Nominated
2014	Rome Web Awards	Best Cliff Hanger	Nominated
2014	Rome Web Awards	Best Trailer	Won
2014	DC Webfest	Gold Award	Won
