= DeVanity =

2011 American soap opera web series

- Season 3 title card
- Created by: Michael Caruso
- Written by: Michael Caruso
- Directed by: Kelley Portier
- Starring: Michael Caruso; Alexis Zibolis; Katie Caprio; Mike Dirksen; Erin Buckley; Katie Apicella; Chris Parke; Kyle Lowder; Jason Christopher; Jaclyn Lyons; John Brody
- Country of origin: United States
- Original language: English
- No. of seasons: 4
- No. of episodes: 28

Production
- Executive producer: Michael Caruso
- Producer: Kelley Portier
- Production company: Caruso/Portier

Original release
- Network: DeVanity.com (website expired); The SFN (season 2); Vimeo
- Release: April 28, 2011 – March 20, 2014

Related
- Winterthorne

DeVanity is a soap opera web series which ran from April 28, 2011 to March 20, 2014. It was created, written and executive produced by Michael Caruso.

== Premise ==
Richard DeVanity, patriarch of the wealthy and dysfunctional DeVanity family of Los Angeles, has been murdered by his psychotic lover. Now Jason DeVanity and his siblings must struggle to keep their father's renowned jewelry empire from crumbling around them.

== Cast ==
=== Main ===
- Michael Caruso as Jason DeVanity (seasons 1–4)
- Alexis Zibolis as Lara Muller DeVanity (seasons 1–4)
- Katie Caprio as Bianca DeVanity Roth Regis (seasons 1–4)
- Mike Dirksen as Alexander Roth (seasons 1–4)
- Erin Christine Buckley as Jackie DeVanity Crowne (season 1–season 3)
- Katie Apicella as Dr. Portia Muller Roth Regis (seasons 2–4)
- Chris Parke as Byron DeVanity #1 (season 1)
- Kyle Lowder as Andrew Regis (seasons 2–4)
- Jason Christopher as Byron DeVanity #2 (season 2)
- Jaclyn Lyons as Isabelle Roth DeVanity #2 (seasons 3–4)
- John Brody as Dr. Sebastian Crowne (season 2)
- Tiffany Michelle as Scarlett Kane-Devanity (season 4)

=== Guest stars ===
- Robin Riker as Angelica Roth (seasons 2–4)
- Gordon Thomson as Preston Regis (seasons 3–4)
- Maxwell Caulfield as Richard DeVanity (seasons 3–4)
- Arianne Zucker as Julia Regis (seasons 3–4)
- Charlene Tilton as Francesca DeVanity (seasons 3–4)
- Steve Kanaly as Charles Kane (season 4)
- Andrea Evans as Vivian Price (season 4)
- Sheree J. Wilson as Claudia Muller (season 4)

== Episodes ==
DeVanity consists of 28 episodes.

Season 1

1. "Broken Bitches"
2. "My Brother’s Humper"
3. "Too Many Pricks"
4. "Better Things to Swallow"
5. "Bad Seeds"
6. "Sparing No Expense"
7. "Fake Jewels"

Season 2

1. "Shock Therapy"
2. "Crash and Burn"
3. "Mommy Dearest"
4. "Holly Through Your Heart"
5. "Battle of the Brides"
6. "Surprise, Surprise"
7. "Other People’s Bodies"
8. "Payback’s A Bitch"

Season 3

1. "Sleeping Giant"
2. "Clash of the Tyrants"
3. "Broken Promises"
4. "Shattered Future"
5. "Aftermath"
6. "Baby Bumps"
7. "A Matter of Timing"

Season 4

1. "Death Becomes Him, Part 1"
2. "Death Becomes Him, Part 2"
3. "Phoenix Rising"
4. "Revelations"
5. "Homecoming"
6. "Blood Diamonds"

== Production and broadcast ==
DeVanity was created, written and executive produced by Michael Caruso, who also writes and executive produces the series, and stars as Jason DeVanity. The series is directed by Kelley Portier.

DeVanity debuted on April 28, 2011, and the final episode was released on March 20, 2014.

== Reception and awards ==
Writing for Entertainment Weekly, Alina Adams named the series one of the "4 best soap operas on the web" in 2015.

In 2014, DeVanity was nominated Daytime Emmy Award for Outstanding New Approaches Drama Series. In 2015, Andrea Evans was nominated for a Daytime Emmy for Outstanding Performer in a New Approaches Drama Series for her portrayal of Vivian Price.

DeVanity won Indie Intertube Awards for Best Soap Opera and Best Directing in a Soap Opera (Kelley Portier) in 2011, and an Indie Soap Award for Best Writing in a Drama (Michael Caruso) in 2013. In 2015, the series won Indie Series Awards for Best Guest Actress in a Drama (Andrea Evans) and Best Production Design (Michael Caruso and Barbara Caruso).

Since its debut in 2011, the series has been nominated for multiple other awards.
