= Ragged Isle =

American dramatic web series

- Created by: Barry Dodd and Karen L. Dodd
- Starring: Meghan Benton; Ian Carlsen; Kathryn Coccyx; Adam Cogswell; Rick Dalton; Denis Fontaine; Todd Manter; Christine Marshall; Amie Marzen; Erik Moody; Kathryn Perry; April Joy Purinton; Suzanne Rankin; Beth Saufler; Michael Dix Thomas; Greg Tulonen
- Country of origin: United States
- No. of seasons: 3
- No. of episodes: 22

Production
- Executive producer: Karen L. Dodd

Ragged Isle is a Maine-based dramatic web series that has won multiple Indie Series Awards and other accolades.

== History ==
"Ragged Isle" was created by the husband-and-wife team of Barry Dodd and Karen L. Dodd as a project for their production company, The Entertainment Experiment. The story was conceived by Greg Tulonen, Barry Dodd, Karen L. Dodd, Rick Dalton, and Jacob Lear, with episodes directed by Barry Dodd. It was shot in the summers of 2010 and 2011, entirely on location in Maine, featuring an all-Maine cast and crew.

The project's origins date back to 2007, when the Dodds collaborated with a group of University of Southern Maine actors to enter the College Soap Opera Contest, sponsored by SOAPnet. Their entry, "Criehaven," a melodrama set on a mysterious Maine island, placed in the top five in the nation. Three years later, the couple would revisit the concept for a new project, now called "Ragged Isle."

The Dodds are fans of Dark Shadows, hence some similarities and references to the '60s gothic soap opera.

== Premise ==
Young journalism school graduate Vicki Burke has just landed a job at a newspaper on the quiet Maine island of Ragged Isle. She is soon caught up in a mystery involving several deaths by drowning, though the victims' bodies are discovered nowhere near the water, their clothes completely dry. The solution to the puzzle may uncover secrets that have been kept on the island for generations.

== Production ==
Season one of "Ragged Isle" (10 episodes out of a planned 22) was written by Greg Tulonen, Barry Dodd, Karen L. Dodd, Rick Dalton, and Jacob Lear, and was shot at various Maine locations during the summer of 2010. The first episode premiered online on March 9, 2011, with new episodes released each week until the season finale aired on May 11, 2011.

On February 1, 2012, the first season relaunched on the entertainment network web site The SFN, home of other notable web series, including California Heaven, River Ridge, and AIDAN 5, among others.

Scripts for seasons two and three (six episodes each) were written by Greg Tulonen, based on a story by Greg Tulonen, Barry Dodd, Karen L. Dodd, Rick Dalton, and Jacob Lear. Both seasons were shot in the summer of 2011.

Season two premiered May 29, 2012 on raggedisle.com, with new episodes released every other week.

The world premiere of its third and final season screened at the Raindance Film Festival Web Fest in London in September 2013 and debuted online on October 31, 2013.

The twenty-second episode (and series finale) debuted at the Alamo Theatre in Bucksport, Maine on October 18, 2014, as part of the 2014 Ghostport Festival. The finale made its online debut on October 31, 2014.

== Setting ==
Ragged Isle is small island lobstering community that lies 21 miles off the coast of Maine. It is a highly fictionalized version of the real-life Maine island of Criehaven.

== Cast and characters ==
- Brent Askari as Gus Hendershot, who owns the Island Grocer, a central hub of all activity on Ragged Isle. If you want to know what's going on with someone on the island, Gus is a good man to ask.
- Meghan Benton as Vicki Burke, a recent college graduate embarking on a new career in journalism on Ragged Isle, a remote fishing community off the coast of Maine.
- Ian Carlsen as Paul Soucey, the captain of a Ragged Isle lobstering vessel manned by a crew of his three closest friends. They make the grave mistake of fishing in the island's "restricted zone," possibly setting off a devastating chain of events.
- Sebastian Carlsen as Sebastian Carlsen (a.k.a. "Sea Bass"), the clerk at the Island Grocer and amateur stand-up comic.
- Kathryn Coccyx as Madame Clelia. Some people on Ragged Isle call her the Island Witch, while others think she's just a harmless eccentric. Either way, most islanders steer clear of her. But it is she more than anyone on the island who may have the powers and foresight to rescue them all.
- Adam Cogswell as Louis Gilbert, a nervous, superstitious fellow, who regularly visits Madame Clelia for spiritual guidance. He's perhaps a surprising choice to be Harrison Shaw's protégé, but Shaw hand-picked Louis himself, grooming the young man to take over for him "when the time comes."
- Cathy Counts as Dr. Gail Monroe, Ragged Isle's only resident doctor, with a private practice out of her home. Her patient list includes every resident of Ragged Isle.
- Rick Dalton as Sheriff Dalton, who grew up on Ragged Isle, and continues to call the island his home. As the island's sole resident lawman, he takes it upon himself to the lead the investigation into all the island's crimes, small and large.
- Denis Fontaine as Vance Trundle, who for the past 15 years has been editor and sole employee of island's newspaper, The Ragged Isle Star. He may sometimes seem scattered and disorganized, but he's actually a sharp newspaperman and something of a muckraker, using the paper to champion the working man and skewer the establishment.
- Dominic Lavoie as Mac, the third man on Paul Soucey's lobstering crew. Mac is loud, outgoing, and gregarious, with a juvenile sense of humor and somewhat poor impulse control, which may just get him into trouble one of these days.
- Todd Manter as Harrison Shaw. While it has been said that lobstermen do not have bosses, all the lobstermen of Ragged Isle must work in the shadow of Harrison Shaw, who has exclusive deals with every seafood distributor on the mainland. Shaw wields his power with a stern hand. He has a quick temper and a long memory, and lobstermen know better than to cross him.
- Christine Louise Marshall as Colleen Drake, Ragged Isle's head librarian. Residents know better than to let their books become overdue, lest they earn a stern stare from a somewhat humorless Drake.
- Amie Marzen as Julie Katsarakis, newly elected chairwoman of the island council, a young woman filled with energy and optimism. She is inseparable from her closest confidante and mentor, Rose Fuller, whom she thinks of as a second mother.
- Erik Moody as Deputy Dan Therrien, a driven young lawman who is called to Ragged Isle by Sheriff Dalton to help investigate a baffling murder case on the island.
- Kathryn Perry as Allison Thorne, an agent with the Department of Homeland Security, who has been entrusted with considerable authority and power, and has a cadre of agents under her command.
- Doug Porter as "Dirty" Bill, the final man on Paul's crew. He's more of a follower than a leader, looking to Eric or Paul for cues on what he should do. That may or may not be in his best interest.
- April Joy Purninton as Rachel Moody, who runs the Ragged Isle watering hole The Glass Jaw. She has a very friendly relationship with Sheriff Dalton, whom she calls "Rick."
- Suzanne Rankin as Gertie Kendrick, a reclusive, bestselling author who writes enormously popular novels about the early days of Maine's history.
- Beth Saufler as Rose Fuller, a beloved figure on Ragged Isle, known for her gentle humor, her generosity, her good common sense, and her homemade pies.
- Justin C. St. Louis as Trevor Stebbins, a young writer who has worked as an assistant to noted author Gertie Kendrick for the past several years.
- Michael Dix Thomas as Eric Burke, Vicki's twin brother, who works on the crew of his best friend Paul's lobster boat. He and Vicki used to be inseparable, but they have drifted apart over the past four years, after she went to college and he moved to Ragged Isle.
- Greg Tulonen as Dr. Brian Hoffman, who works for the Maine CDC investigating outbreaks of mysterious illnesses. Having an avid interest in the paranormal, he also explores unexplained phenomenon around Maine.

== Season 1 ==
Episode Number	Episode title	Original airdate	Episode Description
1	"Stranger in a Strange Land"	March 9, 2011	Vicki Burke is starting a job as a newspaper photographer on a remote island off the coast of Maine. On her way, she meets a friendly eccentric and a handsome young lobsterman, and reunites with her twin brother Eric, who has secret plans of his own that very night.
2	"11 O'Clock Tick Tock"	March 16, 2011	Bored and lonely on her first night on Ragged Isle, Vicki sets off on her own, and has a strange encounter with another local. Meanwhile, her brother and his lobsterman pals try to calm their nerves at the island watering hole, The Glass Jaw.
3	"Shadows and Tall Trees"	March 23, 2011	Vicki starts her new job at The Ragged Isle Star, where she meets the editor, Vance Trundle. Paul, Eric, Mac, and Bill meet to get their stories straight, then Vicki and Paul's paths cross once again. And Sheriff Dalton has some questions for Paul.
4	"No Line on the Horizon"	March 30, 2011	A driven young lawmen arrives on Ragged Isle to assist Sheriff Dalton in his investigation of the recent deaths. Vicki stumbles upon a secret meeting in the woods. Things get heated at the town meeting when the subject of the annual lobster festival comes up.
5	"I Will Follow"	April 6, 2011	Ragged Isle residents pay their respects to the two recent victims, and Paul and Eric compare notes on the investigation, which appears to be targeting them. Meanwhile, Sheriff Dalton and Deputy Dan make their way to yet another crime scene.
6	"Running to Stand Still"	April 13, 2011	With the death toll rising, Sheriff Dalton and Deputy Dan intensify their investigation into the mysterious island deaths. Meanwhile, at the town library, Paul and Vicki continue an investigation of their own.
7	"The Unforgettable Fire"	April 20, 2011	Rachel shares the romantic and tragic story of the woman in the photograph on the wall of The Glass Jaw. Deputy Dan turns up a new clue in the form of a reluctant witness—whom Sheriff Dalton takes on a little drive.
8	"One Step Closer"	April 27, 2011	Madame Clelia has an urgent message for a skeptical Sheriff Dalton. Paul and Vicki discover that spying isn't all that interesting (until it is). And Rose and Julie have an unexpected encounter in Rose's home.
9	"Last Night on Earth"	May 4, 2011	You never know what will happen at the annual Ragged Isle Talent Show, except that the winner will receive the coveted position of "Lobster of Ceremonies" at the upcoming lobster festival.
10	"Love Comes Tumbling"	May 11, 2011	The islanders come out for the annual Ragged Isle lobster festival, but will the celebration go off without a hitch?

== Season 2 ==
Episode Number	Episode title	Original airdate	Episode Description
11	"A Sort of Homecoming"	May 29, 2012	In the wake of the lobster festival tragedy, outside investigators arrive on Ragged Isle to find residents beset by fear and mistrust. Meanwhile, certain islanders are conducting investigations of their own.
12	"I Still Haven't Found What I'm Looking For"	June 12, 2012	Madame Clelia has something for Dr. Hoffman. Agent Thorne has questions for Julie. Gus has an insight for Sheriff Dalton.
13	"Drowning Man"	June 26, 2012	Louis struggles with new responsibilities. Julie debriefs with Rose. Sheriff Dalton and Agent Thorne butt heads. Vance faces questions.
14	"Sometimes You Can't Make It on Your Own"	July 10, 2012	Vicki and Paul take others into their confidence. Agent Thorne gets to know Deputy Dan. Dr. Monroe checks up on Gertie.
15	"Moment of Surrender"	July 24, 2012	Gertie receives an urgent visit from old friends. Agent Thorne confronts a subordinate. Dr. Hoffman and Sheriff Dalton hit the books.
16	"Where Did It All Go Wrong"	August 14, 2012	Trying to get to the bottom of everything that's been happening on the island, Paul escorts someone back to where it all began.

== Season 3 ==
Episode Number	Episode title	Original airdate	Episode Description
17	"Speed of Life"	October 31, 2013	After the horrific events of the previous evening, those on Ragged Isle still alive and accounted for struggle to cope with their changed circumstances as they zero in on an ever-shortening list of suspects.
18	"Gone"	November 15, 2013	Paul finds himself in dangerous circumstances. Sheriff Dalton and Dr. Hoffman make a gruesome discovery. A grief-stricken Vicki gives advice to Julie.
19	"40"	December 31, 2013	A secret that has been kept on the island for the past four decades finally comes to the surface as the answers to mysteries old and new are revealed.
20	"Original of the Species"	September 8, 2014	Dr. Hoffman absorbs shocking news and confronts someone he holds responsible for many of the island's tragedies. Meanwhile, Julie makes a disturbing discovery of her own.
21	"Are You Gonna Wait Forever?"	September 18, 2014	Dr. Hoffman shares his newly discovered information and Sheriff Dalton heads for the last place on the island left to look. Julie confronts Rose about her discovery.
22	"Exit"	October 31, 2014	It is the final showdown on Ragged Isle, as new alliances are drawn and the battle between good and evil comes to a bloody close.

== Soundtrack ==
The Ragged Isle soundtrack features exclusively Maine-based musicians and bands. In the second season, musician Richard de Costa, who had contributed songs in season one, composed an original score for four of the six individual episodes. He returned to score every episode of season three. The first two seasons' soundtracks are available for purchase on the online music store Bandcamp, courtesy of Deporter Records, as is Richard deCosta's stand-alone score album, courtesy of Richard deCosta.

== Awards ==
=== Won ===
- Best Director (Drama), Barry Dodd, 4th Annual Indie Series Awards
- Best Web Series (Drama), 3rd Annual Indie Series Awards
- Best Cinematography, Barry Dodd and Derek Kimball, 3rd Annual Indie Series Awards
- Best Director (Drama), Barry Dodd, 3rd Annual Indie Series Awards

=== Nominations ===
- Best Special/Visual Effects, Richard DeCosta, Eric Anderson, and Derek Kimball, 6th Annual Indie Series Awards
- Best Original Score, Richard DeCosta, 6th Annual Indie Series Awards
- Best Soundtrack, Barry Dodd, 6th Annual Indie Series Awards
- Best Directing (Drama), Barry Dodd, 6th Annual Indie Series Awards
- Best Editing, Barry Dodd, 6th Annual Indie Series Awards
- Best Cinematography, Derek Kimball, David C. Miller, and Barry Dodd, 6th Annual Indie Series Awards
- Best Editing, Barry Dodd, 5th Annual Indie Series Awards
- Best Cinematography, David C. Miller and Derek Kimball, 5th Annual Indie Series Awards
- Best Web-Series, 2014 Horror Society Awards
- Grooviest Drama, 3rd Annual Groovy Awards
- Best Web Series (Drama), 4th Annual Indie Series Awards
- Best Supporting Actor (Drama), Ian Carlsen, 4th Annual Indie Series Awards
- Best Writing (Drama), Greg Tulonen, Barry Dodd, Karen L. Dodd, Rick Dalton, and Jacob Lear, 4th Annual Indie Series Awards
- Best Soundtrack, 4th Annual Indie Series Awards
- Best Editing, Barry Dodd, 4th Annual Indie Series Awards
- Best Visual/Special Effects, Eric Anderson, 4th Annual Indie Series Awards
- Best Actor (Drama), Rick Dalton, 3rd Annual Indie Series Awards
- Best Writing (Drama), Greg Tulonen, Barry Dodd, Karen L. Dodd, Rick Dalton, and Jacob Lear, 3rd Annual Indie Series Awards
- Best Ensemble (Drama), 3rd Annual Indie Series Awards
- Best Use of Music, 3rd Annual Indie Series Awards
- Fans' Choice, 3rd Annual Indie Series Awards
