= Pascal Trottier =

Canadian filmmaker and screenwriter

Pascal Trottier is a Canadian filmmaker and screenwriter. He graduated from the Canadian Film Centre in 2005. His credits include The Colony, starring Laurence Fishburne and Bill Paxton, and the horror feature Hellions, directed by Bruce McDonald and starring Chloe Rose and Robert Patrick, which had its world premiere at the 2015 Sundance Film Festival. In 2013, he wrote for the horror TV series Darknet, produced by Steve Hoban and Vincenzo Natali, and penned a segment of the horror anthology feature film A Christmas Horror Story, which won the Writers Guild of Canada award for Best Feature Screenplay in 2016. His latest screenwriting credit is the historical horror feature Ithaqua, produced by Hammer Films, and starring Luke Hemsworth, Kevin Durand, and Micheal Pitt. His video game writing credits include Skull and Bones, released in 2024.
