= Houston Bone =

Canadian writer, filmmaker (b. 1993)

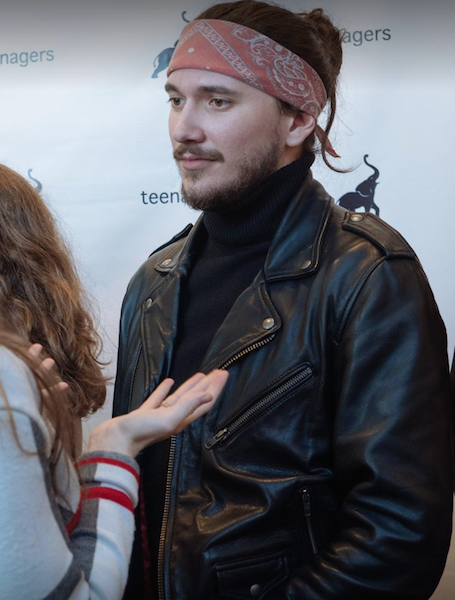
- Bone at a 2017 screening of Teenagers
- Born: Mathew Hubert Murray; June 4, 1993 (age 33); Toronto, Ontario, Canada
- Education: York University
- Occupations: Filmmaker, writer, director, producer
- Years active: 2013–present
- Notable work: Teenagers
- Website: houstonbone.com

Houston Bone (born June 4, 1993) is a Canadian filmmaker, writer, director, and producer. Bone first attracted attention for his work on the web series Teenagers (2014–2017), which won several accolades. His feature-length film debut, I Don't Know Who You Are, premiered at the 2023 Toronto International Film Festival.

== Early life ==
Bone was raised in the Port Credit area of Mississauga by a French Canadian mother and a Scottish Canadian father. In high school, he began releasing his work on YouTube. He graduated from York University's film school. Early in his career, Bone was credited professionally as both Mathew Murray and M. H. Murray.

== Career ==
While in film school, Bone began working on his first web series, titled Teenagers. The series ran for three seasons, from 2014 to 2017, initially attracting media attention because its cast included former Degrassi stars such as Chloe Rose and Raymond Ablack. Bone co-created the series with close friend Sara Tamosauskas, and they produced the first season alongside Emmanuel Kabongo, who also starred in all three seasons of the series. The second season's premiere episode went viral, amassing millions of views on YouTube. Since its release, Teenagers has received positive reviews from critics and several accolades, including a Canadian Screen Award nomination and an Indie Series Award.

Following the conclusion of Teenagers, Bone wrote and directed a short film titled Ghost starring Mark Clennon as a gay musician who is "ghosted" by his lover. Bone's feature-length film debut, I Don't Know Who You Are, also starring Clennon as the same character from Ghost, premiered in the Discovery program at the 2023 Toronto International Film Festival. The film received positive reviews from critics. Barry Hertz of The Globe and Mail ranked the film 7th on his list of the top 10 Canadian films of 2023.

Bone's sophomore feature film, a horror titled Son of Sara: Volume 1, opened Blood in the Snow on November 17, 2025. The film, which stars Chloe Van Landschoot and Tymika Tafari as a couple anticipating the birth of their son, was later released in the United States and Canada throughout the summer of 2026.

== Filmography ==
Year	Title	Director	Writer	Editor	Producer	Notes
2014–2017	Teenagers	Yes	Yes	Yes	Yes	Web series
2020	Ghost	Yes	Yes	Yes	Yes	Short film
2023	I Don't Know Who You Are	Yes	Yes	Yes	Yes	Feature-length directorial debut
2025	Son of Sara: Volume 1	Yes	Yes	Yes	Yes	

== Accolades ==
Year	Association	Category	Nominated work	Result	Refs
2016	Vancouver Web Series Festival	Best Drama Series	Teenagers	Nominated	
2016	Vancouver Web Series Festival	Best Screenplay	Teenagers	Won	
2017	International Academy of Web Television	Best Directing (Drama)	Teenagers	Nominated	
2018	Vancouver Web Series Festival	Best Canadian Series	Teenagers	Won	
2018	Vancouver Web Series Festival	Best Drama Series	Teenagers	Nominated	
2018	Vancouver Web Series Festival	Best Screenplay	Teenagers	Nominated	
2023	Calgary International Film Festival	$10,000 RBC Emerging Artist Award	I Don't Know Who You Are	Nominated	
2024	Riviera International Film Festival	Best Film	I Don't Know Who You Are	Nominated	
2024	Connecticut LGBTQ Film Festival	Rising Star Award	I Don't Know Who You Are	Won	
2025	Blood in the Snow Film Festival ("Bloodies")	Best Director	Son of Sara: Volume 1	Nominated	
