= Spencer Creaghan =

Canadian musician and composer

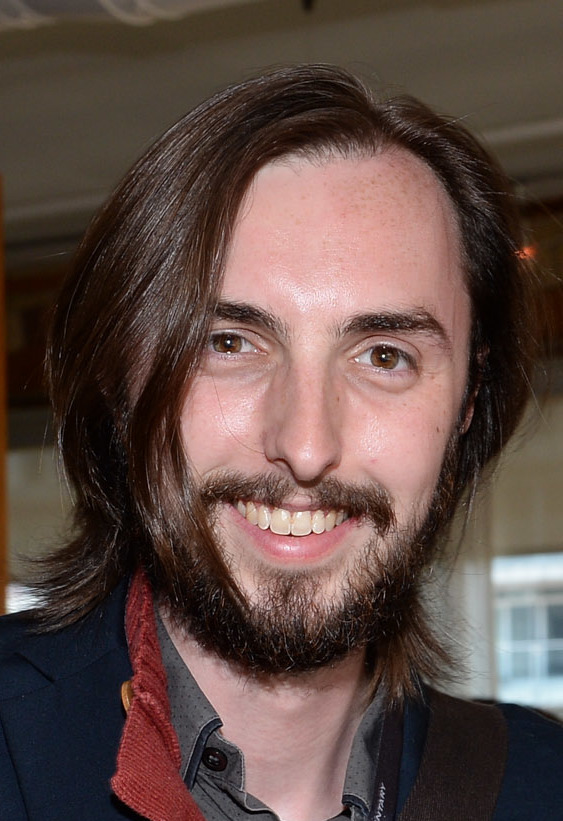
- Creaghan in 2017
- Born: Spencer Creaghan
- Education: York University
- Occupation: Film composer
- Years active: 2012–present
- Notable work: Teenagers, I Don't Know Who You Are, SurrealEstate

Spencer Creaghan is a Canadian musician and film composer.

Creaghan has created original scores for the web series Teenagers, television series such as SurrealEstate, and feature films such as Black Water (2018), Quickening (2021), Motherly (2021), and I Don't Know Who You Are (2023), the latter of which premiered at the 2023 Toronto International Film Festival.

== Career ==
=== Film ===
Creaghan has been producing film scores for over a decade. He attended York University, where met many of his collaborators. He is also an alumnus of the Slaight Family Music Lab at the Canadian Film Centre.

In 2018, Creaghan won a Bloodie Award for his work on the film Altered Skin.

In 2022, Creaghan received a Canadian Screen Award nomination for Best Original Score at the 10th Canadian Screen Awards for his work on the 2021 film Motherly.

Creaghan created the score for Houston Bone's feature film I Don't Know Who You Are, which premiered in the Discovery program at the 2023 Toronto International Film Festival. The film received acclaim from critics and was released theatrically in 2024.

His other credits have included the films Black Water and Quickening, the web series Teenagers, and the television drama series SurrealEstate.

=== Other work ===
He has also composed orchestral parts for symphonic metal bands, including Carnifex, Aborted, Devilment, Astaroth, Diamorte, and Lindsay Schoolcraft.
