= That's My DJ =

- Genre: Drama
- Created by: D. W. Waterson
- Directed by: D. W. Waterson
- Starring: Emily Piggford; Jade Hassoune; Kelly McCormack; Jacob Neayem
- Country of origin: Canada
- No. of seasons: 3
- No. of episodes: 24

Production
- Editor: Maureen Grant
- Camera setup: Single-camera
- Running time: 1-15 minutes

Original release
- Release: 2014 – 2017

That's My DJ is a Canadian web series created by D. W. Waterson. The series, created in 2014, follows the lives of several people who work in the Toronto nightlife industry. It has been funded through various Indiegogo crowdfunding campaigns. The first season originally premiered online in 2014, before being re-released in 2016, following the release of the second season on YouTube. A third and final season premiered online July 7, 2017.

Since its release, the series has won several awards, including at the Vancouver Web Series Festival and the New York Television Festival. It additionally received two Canadian Screen Award nominations.

== Background ==
That's My DJ was created by Canadian DJ D. W. Waterson in 2014. They wanted to create the series because they felt that the stories of LGBT women and women of colour and their importance in the Toronto nightlife industry and the electronic music scene were not being told. In an interview, Waterson discussed their intentions with the series, saying:

Being a DJ myself I found myself looking around the clubs and bars thinking there are so many interesting characters set against this colorful background, why isn’t anyone telling this story?! It was that moment that inspired me to write and create That’s My DJ.

Waterson collaborated with other creatives in the Toronto arts scene to create the series and initially relied on self-financing to produce the project. The first season of the series originally premiered online in 2014, after a successful crowdfunding campaign via Indiegogo; however, after it struggled to attract viewers, it was subsequently pulled from YouTube.

Following the success of the second season in 2016, the first season was re-uploaded to YouTube. The second and third seasons were also funded primarily through Indiegogo campaigns. Each season consists of 8 episodes, with a total of 24 episodes over three seasons. As of 2020, the three seasons have been viewed over 3 million times cumulatively on YouTube.

== Plot ==
The series focuses on the nightlife scene in Toronto and each season follows a different character, ranging from DJs (seasons 1 and 3) to event promoters (season 2). The second season deals with an LGBT relationship between two women.

== Cast and characters ==
=== Main ===
- Emily Piggford as Meagan (season 1–3)
- Jade Hassouné as Sam (season 2–3)
- Jacob Neayem as Simon (season 1)

=== Recurring ===
- Kelly McCormack as Dee (season 2–3)
- Nico Racicot as Lucas (season 2–3)
- Kristian Bruun as Peter (season 2–3)
- Dayle McLeod as Hannah (season 2)
- Kyle Mac as Kyle (season 1)

== Reception ==
NOW Magazine called the series "well-produced, well-acted, and well-written". Flare dubbed the series a "must-see—even if you're not in the music scene". TalkNerdyWithUs.com described the series as "funny, exciting, inventive, occasionally maddening, always beautiful, and heavily invested in the duality of heartbreak and optimism". Teen Vogue praised the series for its portrayal of LGBTQ+ women of colour.

== Awards and nominations ==
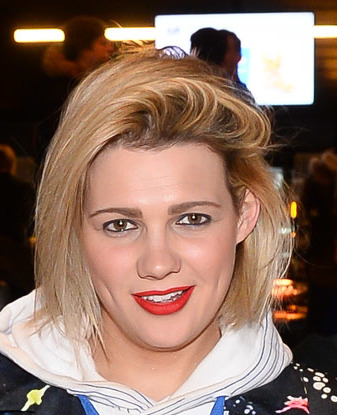
D. W. Waterson won several awards for directing and producing the series.

The series has won various awards, including the Best Director award at the 2016 New York Television Festival for Waterson, as well as Best Canadian Series and Best Director at the 2017 Vancouver Web Series Festival. The series has received two Canadian Screen Award nominations, for Emily Piggford's performance in 2016, and for Waterson's direction in 2018.

Year	Association	Category	Nominee(s)	Result	Refs
2016
2016	New York Television Festival	Best Director	D. W. Waterson	Won	
2017	Canadian Screen Awards	Best Performance in a Series Produced for Digital Media	Emily Piggford	Nominated	
2017	Vancouver Web Series Festival	Best Drama Series	D. W. Waterson	Nominated	
2017	Vancouver Web Series Festival	Best Director	D. W. Waterson	Won	
2017	Vancouver Web Series Festival	Best Canadian Series	D. W. Waterson	Won	
2018
2018	Canadian Screen Awards	Best Direction, Web Program or Series	D. W. Waterson	Nominated	
2018	Seoul Web Fest	Best Music	D. W. Waterson	Won	
