= D. W. Waterson =

Canadian musician and director

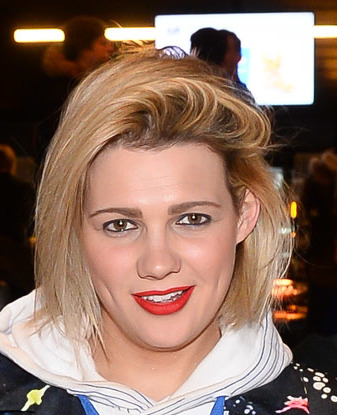
- Waterson in 2017
- Education: Ryerson University
- Occupations: DJ, drummer, writer, director, web series creator
- Years active: 2014–present
- Notable work: That's My DJ

D. W. Waterson is a Canadian DJ, drummer, writer, director, and web series creator. They are known for their work as a performer and for creating, writing, and directing the award-winning web series That's My DJ (2014–2017). Their feature-length directorial film debut, Backspot, was released in 2023.

== Early life and education ==
Waterson attended Ryerson University for film school. After graduating, they settled in Toronto.

== Career ==
=== Early work ===
Beginning in the early 2010s, Waterson worked as a DJ and event promoter in and around Toronto. They created a monthly event called Home Brew, which features themselves and other local DJs. Waterson also served as a post-production supervisor for Rhombus Media; they worked on the award-winning film Closet Monster in 2015. They have also directed various music videos. In 2014, they founded their production company, Night is Y.

=== Directing ===
Waterson released the first season of their first web series, That's My DJ, in 2014. Waterson directed every episode of the series and co-wrote several. They also wrote and produced some of the music. Waterson based some of the series on their own experiences as a queer person in the music industry. In an interview, Waterson discussed their intentions with the series, saying:

Being a DJ myself I found myself looking around the clubs and bars thinking there are so many interesting characters set against this colorful background, why isn’t anyone telling this story?! It was that moment that inspired me to write and create That’s My DJ.

Waterson collaborated with other creatives in the Toronto arts scene to create the series and initially relied on self-financing to produce the low-budget project. The first season of the series originally premiered online in 2014, after a successful crowdfunding campaign via Indiegogo.

The series gained media attention after the second season premiered in 2016. The second and third seasons were also funded primarily through Indiegogo campaigns. Cumulatively, the three seasons have been viewed over 3 million times on YouTube, as of 2020.

For their work on the series, they won awards for Best Director at the Vancouver Web Series Festival in 2017, and at the New York Television Festival in 2016. NOW Magazine called the series "well-produced, well-acted, and well-written". Flare dubbed the series a "must-see—even if you're not in the music scene". In 2018, for their work on the third season, they were nominated for a Canadian Screen Award for Best Direction in a Web Program or Series, but did not win.

In 2019, Waterson announced their debut feature film as a director, an adaption of Ellie Moon's play, What I Call Her. However, three years later, it was announced that Waterson's feature-length directorial film debut would be a different film titled Backspot, produced by Elliot Page's production company. The film is slated to premiere at the 2023 Toronto International Film Festival.

Waterson directed the six-episode Crave series, The D Cut, which premiered in 2020.

=== Music ===
Waterson released several singles under the stage name hey! dw, including the title track from That's My DJ. In September 2017, they released a single called "Breathe". Another single, "Things I Do", premiered on 25 October 2017; the music video for this single also served as their debut music video.

In October 2017, Waterson embarked on a North American tour with Mystery Skulls. On 31 January 2018, they released their second music video as hey! dw, for the single "The Rhythm", on YouTube.

In May 2019, Waterson announced on Twitter that they will no longer be using the hey! dw stage name, and would thereafter be credited as only D. W. Waterson for all of their future projects.

== Personal life ==
In 2016, Waterson penned an open letter to the CNE, condemning the festival for its lack of female musicians. In the letter, they wrote: "Let's balance these numbers out and inspire a new generation of little girls that yes they too can be rockstars." CNE general manager Virginia Ludy responded to the letter, calling it "self-serving" and denying that there is an issue, claiming that the CNE features "a lot of female performers".

In June 2020, Waterson announced on Instagram that they identify as non-binary and use they/them pronouns.

Waterson collaborates with Devery Jacobs, who is also their girlfriend, through their Night is Y production company.

== Accolades ==
| Year | Association | Category | Nominated work | Result | Refs |
|---|---|---|---|---|---|
| 2016 | New York Television Festival | Best Director | That's My DJ | Won | |
| 2017 | Vancouver Web Series Festival | Best Drama Series | That's My DJ | Nominated | |
| 2017 | Vancouver Web Series Festival | Best Director | That's My DJ | Won | |
| 2017 | Vancouver Web Series Festival | Best Canadian Series | That's My DJ | Won | |
| 2018 | Canadian Screen Awards | Best Direction, Web Program or Series | That's My DJ | Nominated | |
| 2018 | Seoul Web Fest | Best Music | That's My DJ | Won | |
