= Craig Wallace =

Craig Wallace may refer to:

- Craig Wallace (politician) (born 1969), Australian politician
- Craig Wallace (cricketer) (born 1990), Scottish cricketer
- Craig Wallace (director), Canadian television director, writer and producer
