= Replicant (film) =

2001 film by Ringo Lam

- Theatrical release poster
- Directed by: Ringo Lam
- Written by: Lawrence David Riggins; Les Weldon
- Produced by: David Dadon; Danny Lerner; John Thompson
- Starring: Jean-Claude Van Damme; Michael Rooker; Catherine Dent; Brandon James Olson
- Cinematography: Mike Southon
- Edited by: David Richardson
- Music by: Alex Khaskin; Guy Zerafa
- Production companies: 777 Films Corporation; Replicant Pictures
- Distributed by: Artisan Entertainment; Eagle Films; Lionsgate Home Entertainment
- Release date: September 18, 2001
- Running time: 101 minutes
- Country: United States
- Language: English
- Budget: $17 million
- Box office: $894,844

Replicant is a 2001 American science fiction action film directed by Ringo Lam. It stars Jean-Claude Van Damme playing a dual role, and Michael Rooker. It follows a serial killer on the loose and scientists create a clone, teaming up with a police officer to track down the killer. It is the second collaboration between Van Damme and Hong Kong film director Ringo Lam, and the third time that Van Damme has starred in a dual role after Double Impact and Maximum Risk.

The film had a limited theatrical release in many European countries and was released on direct-to-DVD in the United States on September 18, 2001.

== Plot ==
Edward "the Torch" Garrotte (Jean-Claude Van Damme) is a serial killer who has a penchant for killing women and setting them on fire. All of his victims are also mothers. Detective Jake Riley (Michael Rooker) is a Seattle police detective who has spent three years chasing Garrotte. Just days before Jake's retirement Garrotte strikes again, but Jake is off the case. During his retirement party, Jake receives a call from Garrotte, who threatens to go after his friends and family. Realizing Garrotte needs to be stopped no matter what, Riley sets out to stop him.

A secret government agency hires Jake as a consultant on a special project. They have cloned Garrotte from DNA evidence found at a crime scene. They need Jake's help to train this Replicant, who has genetic memories from Garrotte and a telepathic link to him. The Replicant has the body of a 40-year-old but the mind of a child. Jake's job is to help the Replicant track Garrotte down by using the memories stored in Garrotte's DNA.

The Replicant and Jake begin to hunt Garrotte. Jake believes the Replicant could turn on him at any time, as Garrotte's killer instinct may take over. The Replicant tries to understand the world, and his connection with Garrotte. The Replicant does not understand why Jake treats him so roughly, since he views Jake as family. Though Jake is abusive, the Replicant looks to him for protection and guidance as they close in on Garrotte. Garrotte and the Replicant confront each other in a bar after Garrotte fails to kill Jake with a bomb. Garrotte kills a bartender, but lets the Replicant live. An origin story shows that Garrotte was abused by his mother, who then killed her unfaithful husband, and tried to burn their house down, which reveals why Garrotte hates women.

They confront each other later in a parking garage. Garrotte tries to convince his "brother" that Jake cannot be trusted. Frustrated that Garrotte got away, Jake asks why the Replicant let him go. The Replicant replies, "We are the same." Jake tries to tell the Replicant that Garrotte is a sociopath, but he refuses to listen. They find out Garrotte's real name, Luc Savard, and go to the hospital to talk with Savard's mother (Margaret Ryan), but she had already died of a heart attack. Garrotte arrives and beats Jake and also wants his "brother" to join him by killing Jake, but he refuses, forcing Garrotte to try and execute both of them. Jake and the killer fight, leading to an ambulance chase in the parking garage. The van crashes into a toll booth, but the killer escapes. He hits Jake with a shovel and plans to burn him alive.

The Replicant and the killer fight again in the hospital's furnace room. The Replicant wants to kill Garrotte, but realizes that he (the Replicant) is not a killer like him. Garrotte hits the Replicant with a shovel, which causes Jake to shoot him. The Replicant suddenly understands that Jake is his real family. An air conditioner, damaged in the fight, explodes, supposedly killing the Replicant after he gets Jake to safety. Upset by the death of his new "partner", Jake decides to retire from his new job as a consultant.

Weeks later, Jake is with his wife Anne (Catherine Dent) and stepson Danny (Brandon James Olson). Jake spots a man in a raincoat putting a package in their mailbox. However, Jake realizes the Replicant is alive when he finds the package contains a music box as a gift for Jake's help. The Replicant is dating Hooker (Marnie Alton) as the film ends.

== Cast ==
- Jean-Claude Van Damme as Edward "the Torch" Garrotte / Luc Savard / The Replicant
- Michael Rooker as Detective Jake Riley
- Catherine Dent as Anne
- Brandon James Olson as Danny
- Pam Hyatt as Mrs. Riley
- Ian Robison as Stan Reisman
- Allan Gray as Roarke
- James Hutson as Snotty Concierge
- Jayme Knox as Wendy Wyckham
- Paul McGillion as Captain
- Chris Kelly as Chris
- Peter Flemming as Paul
- Margaret Ryan as Gwendolyn Savard
- Marnie Alton as Hooker
- Lillian Carlson as Nurse
- Ingrid Tesch as 911 Operator

== Production ==
Shooting took place in Bulgaria and Vancouver.

== Reception ==
Rotten Tomatoes, a review aggregator, reports that 27% of eleven surveyed critics gave the film a positive review; the average rating was 4.3/10. Mike Jackson of DVD Verdict said, "It's far from a great film, but Replicant is quite possibly the best film Van Damme has starred in since his debut in Bloodsport. Fans of the genre should at least give it a rental." Maitland McDonagh of TV Guide stated, "The action sequences are well-staged ... the 40-year-old martial artist still has the physical goods, executing 180[°] splits and gymnastic stunts with the grace and apparent ease of someone much younger." Earl Cressey of DVD Talk agreed, calling Replicant "a decent sci-fi" film that is "always engaging and has some great action scenes that fans of Van Damme will certainly enjoy."
