= Mark Clennon =

Jamaican Canadian singer (born 1990)

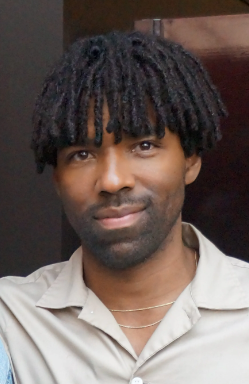
- Clennon at the 2023 Toronto International Film Festival
- Born: Mark Anthony Clennon; August 13, 1990 (age 36); Kingston, Jamaica
- Occupations: Singer, musician, writer, producer, actor
- Years active: 2013–present

Mark Anthony Clennon (born August 13, 1990), credited professionally as Mark Clennon or Clennon, is a Jamaican Canadian singer, musician, writer, producer, and actor.

Born in Kingston and raised in Jamaica, Canada, and the United States, Clennon released several projects as a musician before attracting acclaim for his debut acting performance in the feature film I Don't Know Who You Are, which premiered in the Discovery program at the 2023 Toronto International Film Festival. Clennon was nominated for a Canadian Screen Award for his work on the film's title track in 2025.

The music video for Clennon's 2022 song "Kingston" became the first music video shot in Jamaica to feature an on-screen romance between two men.

== Early life ==
Clennon was born in Kingston, Jamaica, where he began taking piano lessons and writing songs in his youth. At the age of 15, he was relocated to Florida with his family, before moving to Toronto to pursue his music career.

== Career ==
=== Music ===
Clennon began to release music on SoundCloud in the early 2010s, but upon signing a record deal with Montreal-based record label Moonshine, he deleted all of his music off the internet to "start from scratch". In an interview with The Gleaner, Clennon said that he began to take his music career seriously in 2013.

Clennon's first EP, When the Smoke Clears, which consists of four songs, was released on August 19, 2016.

His first official single was "Blood", which attracted acclaim from international music blogs. A music video was released on January 18, 2017. His second single, "Don't Die", was released later that year and was called "powerful" by Complex writer Katie Kelly, and a "sombre pop masterpiece" by Entertainment Weekly. Another single, "Find You", was released with an accompanying music video on February 27, 2017, through Paper.

Around this time, Clennon left Moonshine and signed with another Canadian record label, Bonsound. He subsequently released his second EP, Passion, produced by Grammy Award-winning duo Rainer + Grimm, in 2019.

His third EP, Foreign, was released in 2021 and featured the singles "Part of Your World", "Not Perfect", and "Don't Start a Fire".

In 2022, during Pride Month, Clennon released a single titled "Kingston" with an accompanying music video that featured a romantic storyline between Clennon and male model Jean-Julien Hazoumi. The music video, filmed in Kingston, became the first music video shot in Jamaica to feature an on-screen romance between two men.

In 2025, he released a single titled "No Pain" under the stage name Clennon.

=== Film ===
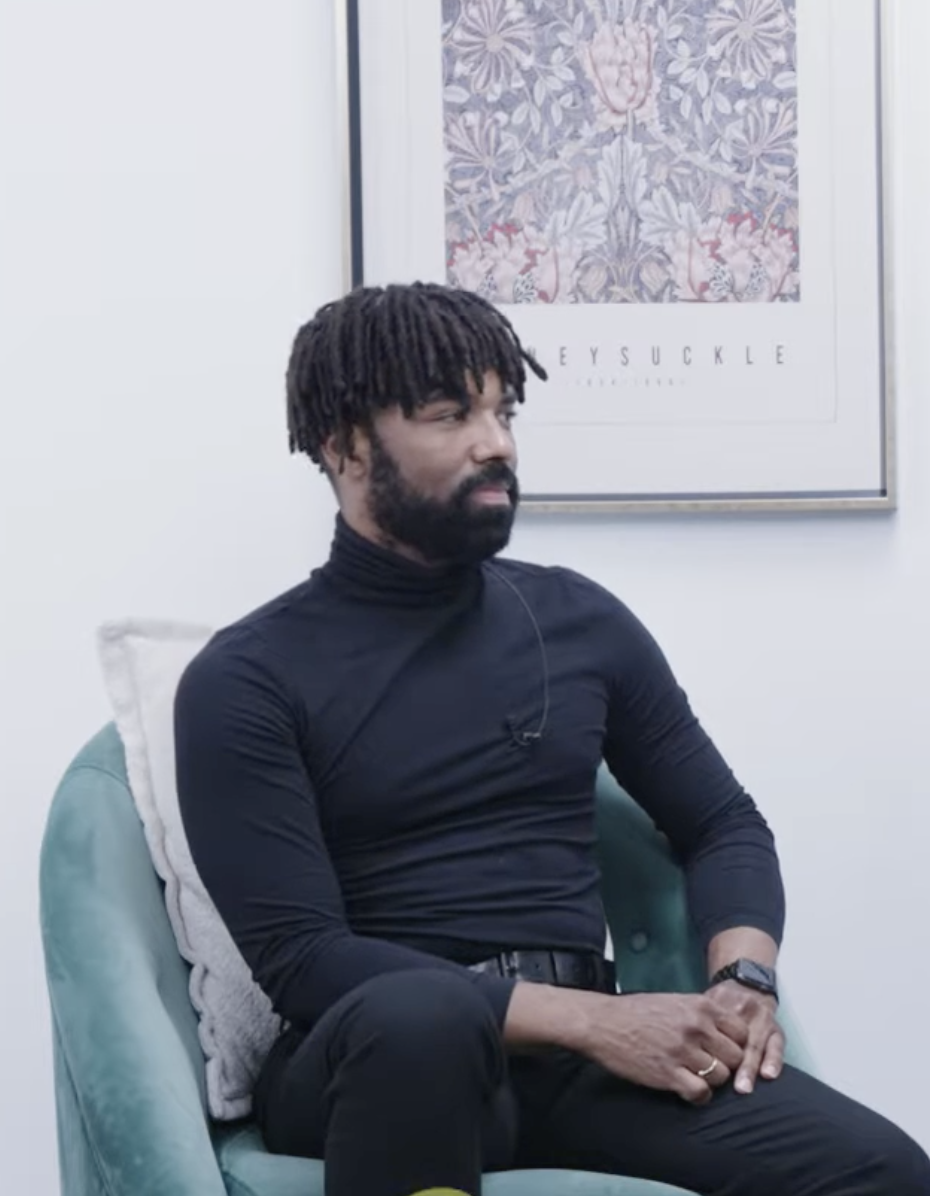
Clennon during an interview in 2024

Outside of music, Clennon played Benjamin in Canadian director Houston Bone's 2020 short film Ghost, which screened at the 30th Inside Out Film and Video Festival, the 5th Paris Independent Film Festival, the 34th Connecticut LGBTQ Film Festival, and the 47th Seattle International Film Festival. Clennon's song "Not Perfect" is featured in the film.

==== I Don't Know Who You Are ====
Clennon reprised the role of Benjamin in Bone's feature film I Don't Know Who You Are, which premiered in the Discovery program at the 2023 Toronto International Film Festival. Clennon also served as a story editor and a producer on the film. This marked Clennon's debut acting performance in a feature-length film. Clennon was named as one of the festival's "Rising Stars", and his performance in the film received acclaim from critics. The Daily Beast dubbed his performance as one of the best of that year's TIFF. The film was picked up for theatrical distribution in 2024. In 2025, for his work on the title track of I Don't Know Who You Are, Clennon was nominated for the Canadian Screen Award for Best Original Song.

== Musical style ==
Clennon's music has been described by critics as both pop and R&B, with dancehall and soul influences.

== Personal life ==
Clennon is out as gay.

== See also ==
- LGBT rights in Jamaica
