= Torment (2013 film) =

- Film poster
- Directed by: Jordan Barker
- Written by: Michael Foster; Thomas Pound
- Produced by: Borga Dorter; Jordan Barker; Allan Fung
- Starring: Katharine Isabelle; Robin Dunne; Peter DaCunha
- Cinematography: Boris Mojsovski
- Edited by: Stephen Philipson
- Music by: Trevor Yulle
- Production companies: Filmax; Gearshift Films; Parachute Pictures
- Distributed by: Vertical Entertainment (United States); Phase 4 Films (Canada); Filmax (Spain)
- Release date: October 11, 2013 (ScreamFest)
- Running time: 80 minutes
- Countries: United States; Canada; Spain
- Languages: English; Spanish

Torment is a 2013 Canadian horror film directed by Jordan Barker. The film had its world premiere on October 11, 2013, at the Screamfest Horror Film Festival. It stars Katharine Isabelle as a woman who must try to save her step-son from an insane family.

== Plot ==
Hearing noises outside their home during a family dinner, Jim Bronson orders his wife Maggie to go outside and take a look. Maggie finds their dog dead before being attacked and killed. The intruders sneak into the house and kills Jim before going upstairs and assaulting Jim and Maggie’s daughter Mary.

Cory Morgan drives his new wife Sarah and his seven-year-old son Liam to their secluded vacation house in a remote area. Still grieving over the death of his birth mother, Liam treats Sarah coldly. Cory tries speaking with his son about accepting Sarah as part of their family. The Morgans find plates of rotten food and used linens in their home. Realizing that squatters were living there, they call Officer Hawkings to the scene. Hawkings explains that there is nothing he can do about a breaking and entering, but he provides his card to make Sarah feel safer about staying in the house.

Sarah and Cory hear strange noises during the night and discover that Liam is missing when they go to investigate. Sarah steps on a nail while searching outside and injures her foot. They find Officer Hawkings tied up in his patrol car before it suddenly explodes, with a mouse masked stranger watching the flames. Because she is injured, Cory is forced to leave Sarah at the house while he goes to the nearby Bronson home for help. Cory discovers the murder scene in the Bronson house before being attacked by the mouse masked and a rabbit masked stranger, and knocked unconscious.

The intruders wear masks cut from Liam’s large stuffed animals, which identify them as Mr. Mouse, Pig Lady, Little Rabbit, and Little Monkey. When Cory wakes, Mr. Mouse tortures him with a car battery. Mr. Mouse produces Liam and forces Cory to tell his son that he does not love him. Liam is emotionally devastated, screaming while Little Rabbit drags him away. Mr. Mouse exclaims "He is part of our family now". He then duct tapes a plastic bag over Cory’s head and leaves him to suffocate.

Back at the Morgan house, Sarah is pursued by Pig Lady. Sarah eventually escapes and is able to drown Pig Lady in a forest creek following a struggle. Cory manages to break free of his restraints. He finds Liam and reassures his son that he only said horrible things because of the torture. Little Monkey interrupts their reunion by confronting Cory with a pitchfork. Cory unmasks Little Monkey and discovers that she is actually a brainwashed Mary Bronson. He knocks her out and escapes into the forest with Liam. Mr. Mouse captures Sarah. Cory hears her screams and tells Liam to wait while he returns to rescue his wife. Sarah electrocutes Mr. Mouse with the car battery and flees outside with Cory.

Little Rabbit emerges with a rifle and fatally shoots Cory. Sarah finds Liam and runs with him through the trees while Little Rabbit fires his gun in pursuit. Little Rabbit finds Liam and hesitates to shoot him. Sarah appears and tells the killer to pull the trigger on her instead, Little Rabbit does this but the gun is empty. Following another struggle, Sarah ultimately subdues Little Rabbit.

After processing the crime scene, a police officer takes Mary Bronson away in a squad car while an ambulance takes Little Rabbit. When her windshield is damaged, the police officer stops her car and is beaten to death with a rock by Mr. Mouse. Mr. Mouse retrieves his mask from an evidence bag and gets behind the wheel as Mary expresses that she knew he would come for her, he replies with 'We must find you a new mother' (implying Pig Lady was going to be her "new" mother). Mary asks about the father. He replies with 'The father will be coming'. Meanwhile, Little Rabbit unshackles himself from the gurney, unmasks himself and grabs a scalpel as he prepares to murder the ambulance driver.

== Cast ==
- Katharine Isabelle as Sarah Morgan
- Robin Dunne as Cory Morgan
- Peter DaCunha as Liam Morgan
- Amy Forsyth as Mary Bronson/Little Monkey
- Stephen McHattie as Officer Hawkings
- Noah Danby as Mr. Mouse
- Inessa Frantowski as Pig Lady
- Bill Colgate as Jim Bronson
- Adrienne Wilson as Maggie Bronson
- Joey Beck as Little Rabbit

== Production ==
Plans to create Torment were officially announced in 2012, and Katharine Isabelle was later confirmed to be performing in the movie. While making the film, Barker chose to make some changes to the script such as trying to add in motivation for the insane family's torture of the Morgan family. The crew experienced some difficulty with lighting, as Torment had a tight budget. As a result, Barker decided to use darkness in order to increase the film's tension.

== Release ==
Vertical Entertainment bought the U.S. distribution rights at the Berlin International Film Festival. Phase 4 Films released it on video on demand on 10 June 2014 and on DVD on 15 July 2014.

== Reception ==
Fearnet praised the film's acting and character development, as they felt that this, along with other elements, made the movie "quick, quiet, creepy, and admirably suspenseful". Patrick Cooper of Bloody Disgusting rated it 3/5 stars and wrote, "But while the plot may lack any stimulating elements, Torment makes up for it with its slick presentation and brooding atmosphere."
