= Raymond Ablack =

Canadian actor and comedian (born 1989)

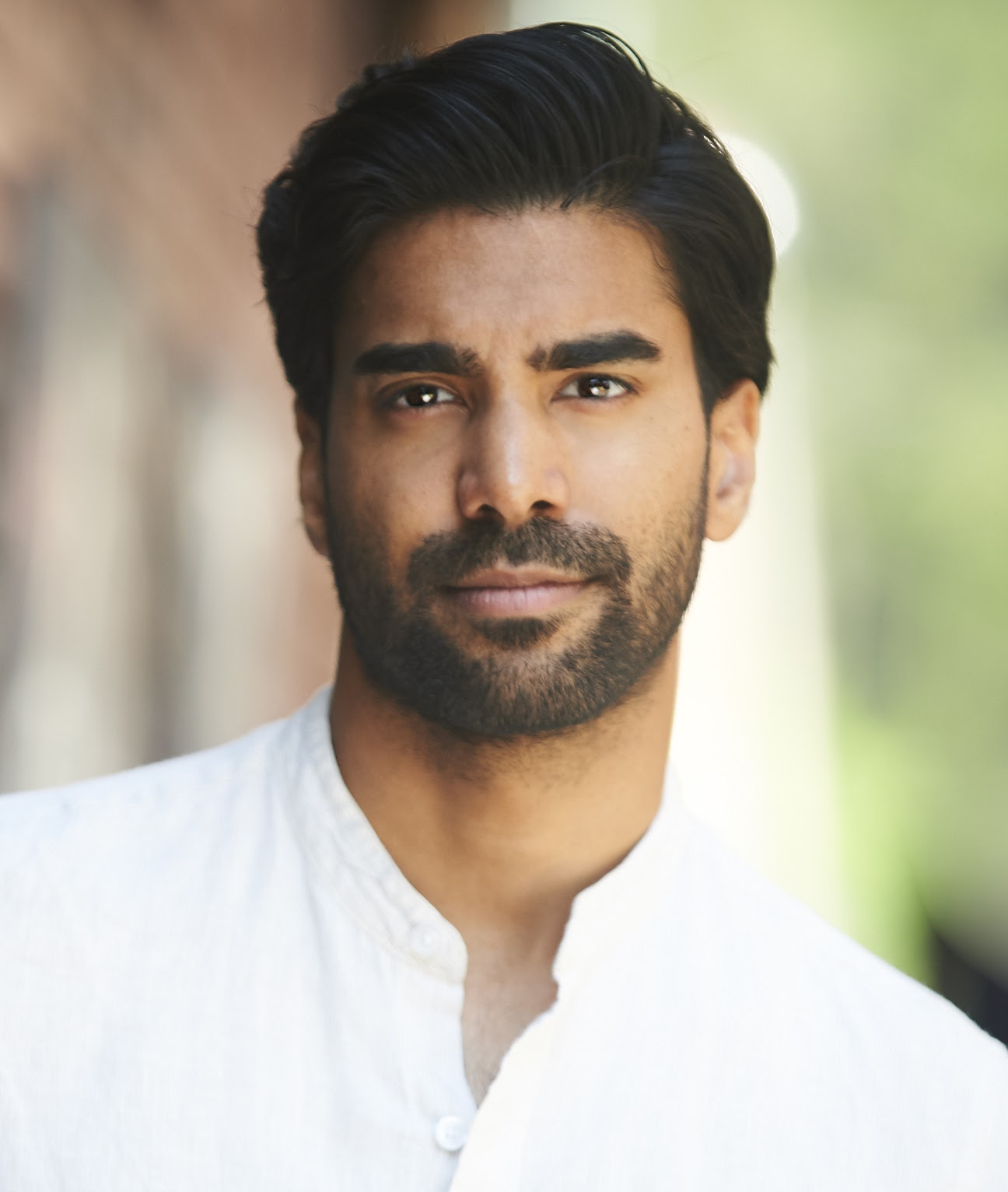
- Ablack in 2017
- Born: Raymond Ablack; November 12, 1989 (age 36); Toronto, Ontario, Canada
- Education: Ryerson University
- Occupations: Actor; comedian
- Years active: 2005–present

Raymond Ablack (born November 12, 1989) is a Canadian actor and comedian. He began his career in the early 2000s as a child actor on stage, performing as Young Simba in The Lion King at the Princess of Wales Theatre. He later gained recognition for playing Sav Bhandari in the teen drama television series Degrassi: The Next Generation from 2007 to 2011.

From 2014 to 2017, Ablack starred in the web series Teenagers; he won an Indie Series Award for his performance in 2016. He has also played recurring roles in Orphan Black (2013–2016), Shadowhunters (2016–2018), and Narcos (2017).

Since the early 2020s, Ablack has achieved wider attention for his performances in several popular Netflix series such as Maid (2021), Workin' Moms (2023), and Ginny & Georgia (2021–present).

== Early life ==
Ablack was born on November 12, 1989 in Toronto, Ontario to Indo-Guyanese parents. His younger sister Rebecca acted with him in Ginny & Georgia. Growing up, Ablack played in a competitive hockey league.

== Career ==
As a child actor, Ablack appeared in television commercials and advertisements. In 2001, he won the role of Young Simba in the theatre production of The Lion King at the Princess of Wales Theatre in Toronto. He performed the role for one year.

Years later, in 2007, Ablack achieved international exposure when he was cast in the recurring role of Sav Bhandari on the long-running Canadian television series Degrassi: The Next Generation. Ablack starred on the series from 2007 until 2011, and appeared in more than 100 episodes. During this time, Ablack also had a guest spot on the television series Life With Derek.

Since his time on Degrassi, Ablack has worked on several film and television productions, including recurring roles in the BBC/Space television series Orphan Black, the Syfy series Defiance, and the Freeform series Shadowhunters.

Ablack's first role in a feature-length film came in 2013 with the release of the independent feature film Fondi '91 (2013), which was filmed on location in Fondi, Italy and received mixed reviews from critics upon release.

From 2014 to 2017, Ablack portrayed Gabriel in the web series Teenagers. The series, directed by Houston Bone, won critical acclaim. In 2016, for his performance in the second season of Teenagers, Ablack won an Indie Series Award for Best Supporting Actor – Drama. For his performance in the third and final season, Ablack was nominated for an International Academy of Web Television Award in 2017, and a second Indie Series Award in 2018.

Ablack played the recurring role of DEA Agent Stoddard in the third season of the critically acclaimed Netflix series Narcos, which premiered on the streaming platform in 2017.

In 2019, he played the recurring role of Sunil Doshi in Burden of Truth. That year, he also appeared alongside Zoey Deutch, Judy Greer, Jermaine Fowler, Noah Reid, and Jai Courtney in the American comedy drama film Buffaloed. The film had its world premiere at the Tribeca Film Festival on April 27, 2019.

In 2021, Ablack played a supporting role in the Netflix miniseries Maid, which was released on October 1, 2021. His performance and physical appearance in the series, specifically a scene in which he appears topless while wearing a cowboy hat, attracted considerable attention on social media platforms such as Twitter, with Marie Claire writing that "the Canadian actor has become our favorite Netflix heartthrob."

In November 2021, he was cast in a romantic comedy feature film called Love in the Villa, also produced by Netflix.

Since 2021, Ablack has starred as Joe, a restaurant owner and one of the main love interests, on the Netflix comedy-drama series Ginny & Georgia. In 2023, he played a recurring love interest role in the final season of the comedy series Workin' Moms.

== Other work ==
Ablack has done extensive charity work throughout his career, mostly through Degrassi, including school-building missions with Me to We and Free the Children.

In 2007, Ablack traveled to Africa with five other Degrassi cast members to build a school in Kenya and, in 2008, he travelled again with his cast members to do charity work in Ecuador. A documentary of Ablack and his cast mates' trip aired on MTV in Canada.

In 2010, he travelled with his fellow Degrassi cast mates to India to help build more schools.

In addition to working as an actor, Ablack has written and performed stand-up comedy in Toronto sporadically since the early 2010s.

== Filmography ==
=== Film ===
Year	Title	Role	Notes
2013	Fondi '91	Anil	
2013	Home Away	Pete	Short film
2014	Latter	Noah	Short film
2014	Sly Cad	Concierge	Short film
2015	Beeba Boys	Grewal's Gangster	
2015	Pieces	Brother	Short film
2017	Ashes	Jay	
2018	Acquainted	Alex	
2018	Shook	Ashish	Short film
2019	Buffaloed	Prakash	
2019	Dinner For Three	Kevin	Short film
2019	La Professoressa	Leo	Short film
2020	The Broken Hearts Gallery	Clayton	
2020	Inside the Actors Cult	Teacher	Short film
2020	Survival Smarts	Ray	Short film
2020	The Beacons of Gondor	Ranger 1	Short film
2022	Love in the Villa	Brandon	
2022	Stay the Night	Roshan	

=== Television ===
Year	Title	Role	Notes
2007–2011	Degrassi: The Next Generation	Savtaj "Sav" Bhandari	118 episodes
2009	Taking a Chance on Love	Shopkeeper	TV movie
2009	Life with Derek	Kevin	Episode: "Truman's Last Chance"
2009	Degrassi Goes Hollywood	Savtaj "Sav" Bhandari	TV movie
2010	Degrassi Takes Manhattan	Savtaj "Sav" Bhandari	TV movie
2011	How to Be Indie	Raj	Episode: "How to Fake Your Way Through a Freaky Formal"
2013–2016	Orphan Black	Raj Singh	4 episodes
2014–2017	Teenagers	Gabriel	Web series; 20 episodes
2015	Defiance	Samir Pandey	6 episodes
2016	Degrassi: Next Class	Savtaj "Sav" Bhandari	2 episodes
2016	Annedroids	Dave	Episode: "Bionic Grandma"
2016–2018	Shadowhunters	Raj	Recurring (seasons 1–2), 6 episodes Guest (season 3), 1 episode
2017	Ransom	Piers Allard	Episode: "Joe"
2017	The Kennedys: After Camelot	Sirhan Sirhan	Episode: "Family Bonds"; credited as Ray Ablack
2017	Narcos	Stoddard	5 episodes
2018	Good Witch	Bryce	Episode: "Family Time"
2018	Private Eyes	Jordan	Episode: "Finding Leroy"
2019	Burden of Truth	Sunil Doshi	4 episodes
2020	Nurses	Kabir Pavan	7 episodes
2021	The Wedding Ring	Anthony Prentice	TV movie
2021	Maid	Nate	Recurring role; 5 episodes
2021	Boyfriends of Christmas Past	Nate Sagar	TV movie
2021–present	Ginny & Georgia	Joe	Main cast; 30 episodes
2023	Workin' Moms	Ram	11 episodes

=== Audio drama ===
Year	Title	Role	Notes
2022–present	Mistletoe Murders	Sam Wilner	

== Filmmaking credits ==
Year	Title	Writer	Producer	Director	Notes
2019–2020	Cookie Biscuits Comedy	No	Yes	Yes	4 episodes
2020	Inside the Actors Cult	Yes	Yes	No	
2020	Survival Smarts	Yes	Yes	No	
2020	The Beacons of Gondor	No	Yes	No	

== Awards and nominations ==
Year	Association	Category	Nominated work	Result		Ref
2016	Indie Series Awards	Best Supporting Actor – Drama	Teenagers	Won		
2017	International Academy of Web Television	Best Male Performance – Drama	Teenagers	Nominated		
2018	Indie Series Awards	Best Supporting Actor – Drama	Teenagers	Nominated		
2018	Alternative Film Festival	Best Cast	Ashes	Nominated	Shared with cast	
2020	Canada Shorts Film Festival	Best Comedy	Inside the Actors Cult	Won	Shared with cast	
2020	Canada Shorts Film Festival	Best Writer	Inside the Actors Cult	Won	Shared with Dalmar Abuzeid	
2020	Seoul Web Fest	Best Comedy	Inside the Actors Cult	Nominated		
2020	Seoul Web Fest	Best Action	The Beacons of Gondor	Won	Shared with cast	
2020	Seoul Web Fest	Best Short	The Beacons of Gondor	Nominated	Shared with cast	
2020	Indie Short Fest	Outstanding Achievement Award – Producer	The Beacons of Gondor	Won	Shared with Scott Paterson, Dalmar Abuzeid, Shane Kippel, & Samantha Ghost.	
