= Walking in Circles (web series) =

- Genre: Comedy / Fantasy
- Created by: Adam Rady; James Rodehaver
- Written by: James Rodehaver
- Directed by: Adam Rady
- Starring: Eric Radic; Jonah Priour; Katie Wilson; Adam Rady
- Voices of: Piotr Walczuk as Slithalazalamazar
- Composer: Brianna Keihle
- Country of origin: United States
- Original language: English
- No. of seasons: 2
- No. of episodes: 19

Production
- Executive producers: Adam Rady; James Rodehaver
- Producer: Jared Hoy
- Cinematography: Jared Hoy
- Editor: Adam Rady
- Running time: Season 2 57:17

Original release
- Release: 2011 – 2015

Walking in Circles is an American comedy web series created by Adam Rady and James Rodehaver. The show revolves around a group of adventurers on a quest to slay Sithalazalamazar, a dragon who had previously killed one of the adventurer's fathers. The series has been described by its creators as "The Office meets Lord of the Rings." The show itself follows a mockumentary format, featuring "whip-smart dialogue" with much of the humor derived from role-playing games like Dungeons & Dragons.

The series premiered on YouTube on July 19, 2011. The remaining ten episodes were released on a weekly basis via YouTube. The creators are currently gathering funding for a second season.

In 2016, the series won the award for Best Fantasy Series at the Vancouver Web Series Festival.
