= Motherly (2021 film) =

2021 film by Craig David Wallace

- Film poster
- Directed by: Craig David Wallace
- Written by: Ian Malone; Craig David Wallace
- Produced by: Avi Federgreen; Laura Tremblay
- Starring: Lora Burke; Tessa Kozma; Kristen MacCulloch; Nick Smyth
- Cinematography: Christoph Benfey
- Edited by: Joel Varickanickal
- Music by: Spencer Creaghan
- Production companies: Federgreen Entertainment; Lucky Dime Films
- Distributed by: Raven Banner Entertainment
- Release date: August 26, 2021 (FrightFest)
- Running time: 80 minutes
- Country: Canada
- Language: English
- Box office: $117,226

Motherly is a 2021 Canadian psychological horror thriller film directed by Craig David Wallace. The film stars Lora Burke as Kate, a woman who lives an isolated cabin with her daughter Beth (Tessa Kozma) after her husband is sent to prison for the death of a young girl; one day, however, the dead girl's parents (Kristen MacCulloch and Nick Smyth) show up demanding answers because they believe Kate was the real killer.

The film premiered on August 26, 2021, at the London FrightFest Film Festival, and was screened at several other Canadian and international film festivals before being released on VOD on November 16, 2021.

Spencer Creaghan received a Canadian Screen Award nomination for Best Original Score at the 10th Canadian Screen Awards in 2022.

== Plot ==
Kate lives in seclusion with her 9-year-old daughter, Beth. A police officer, Hal, periodically checks in on both. Beth hopes for her father, Brad, to come for her ninth birthday.

Brad has committed suicide in prison after he is sentenced there for the murder of Beth's friend Courtenay two years prior. One evening two people, husband and wife Lewis and Mary break in. They are the parents of Courtenay, and they believe the evidence pointing to Brad makes no sense and it's revealed Brad and Mary had an affair. Hal checks in and sees Lewis about to kill Kate, who is confessing to implicating Brad, and shoots him and Kate kills Hal for learning the truth.

Mary incapacitates Kate and takes Beth but Kate then escapes and wounds Mary. Mary is killed by Beth with a pitchfork. Beth is ultimately revealed as a psychopath and Courtenay's actual killer, with Kate setting Brad up to protect her daughter. Beth stabs her mother to death, says she's avenging her father's death then leaves.

As credits roll, a stranger sees Beth walking and asks if she needs help upon seeing her bloody outfit while Beth grins slightly.

== Cast and characters ==
- Lora Burke as Kate
- Tessa Kozma as Beth
- Kristen MacCulloch as Mary
- Nick Smyth as Lewis
- Colin Paradine as Hal

== Release ==
Motherly had its world premiere at the London FrightFest Film Festival on August 26, 2021, and was released on VOD by Entertainment Squad Video on November 16, 2021.

== Reception ==
=== Box office ===
Motherly grossed $0 in North America and $117,226 in other territories.

=== Critical response ===
The review aggregator website Rotten Tomatoes reported an 86% approval rating, with an average score of 6.6/10, based on 7 reviews.
