= Quickening (film) =

2021 Canadian film

- Directed by: Haya Waseem
- Written by: Haya Waseem
- Produced by: Yona Strauss
- Starring: Arooj Azeem; Bushra Azeem; Ashir Azeem; Quinn Underwood
- Cinematography: Christopher Lew
- Edited by: Brendan Mills
- Music by: Spencer Creaghan
- Production company: Quickening Film
- Distributed by: levelFilm
- Release date: September 12, 2021 (TIFF)
- Running time: 88 minutes
- Country: Canada
- Languages: English; Urdu

Quickening is a 2021 Canadian drama film, written and directed by Haya Waseem.

Waseem's debut full-length feature, the film stars Arooj Azeem as Sheila, a young Pakistani Canadian woman navigating her freedom from the social expectations of her immigrant family after starting university. When Sheila loses her virginity, her boyfriend breaks up with her, followed by her father losing his job, the collective pressure causes her to suffer the physical and hormonal imbalances of a false pregnancy.

Arooj Azeem's parents, mother Bushra Azeem and father Ashir Azeem, play her character's parents in the film, while Quinn Underwood plays the boyfriend, Eden.

The film premiered in the Discovery program at the 2021 Toronto International Film Festival (TIFF), with Arooj Azeem being named among TIFF's Share Her Journey Rising Stars Fellows for emerging actors.
