= Teenagers (web series) =

Canadian web series from 2014–2017

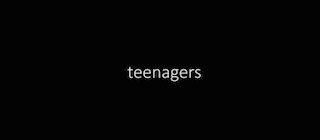
- Genre: Teen drama
- Created by: Houston Bone; Sara Tamosauskas
- Written by: Houston Bone
- Directed by: Houston Bone
- Starring: Chloe Rose; Emmanuel Kabongo; Dana Solomon; Allyson Pratt; Nykeem Provo; Nick Stojanovic; Raymond Ablack; Garrett Hnatiuk; (See full cast list)
- Composer: Spencer Creaghan
- Country of origin: Canada
- Original language: English
- No. of seasons: 3
- No. of episodes: 22

Production
- Executive producers: Emmanuel Kabongo (season 1); T.J. Scott (season 2–3); Martine Brouillet (season 1–3)
- Producer: Houston Bone
- Cinematography: Dmitry Lopatin
- Editor: Houston Bone
- Camera setup: Single-camera
- Running time: 10-20 minutes
- Production company: Black Elephant Productions

Original release
- Release: January 19, 2014 – November 26, 2017

Teenagers (often stylized as teenagers) is a Canadian web series created by Houston Bone and Sara Tamosauskas. With an ensemble cast that includes Emmanuel Kabongo and former Degrassi stars Chloe Rose and Raymond Ablack, Teenagers presents various storylines in the form of vignettes and focuses on social issues such as teen angst, racism, violence, slut-shaming, and sexuality.

The first season premiered on YouTube in early 2014. The second season went viral in 2015. A third and final season was released in 2017.

Since its release, Teenagers has amassed millions of views online, and has received numerous accolades, including an Indie Series Award, several IAWTV Award nominations, and a Canadian Screen Award nomination.

== Background ==
Teenagers initially attracted media attention because its cast included former Degrassi stars Chloe Rose and Raymond Ablack. Louis Chunovic of Playback published a piece on the series, writing that "the young creators of Teenagers had to have plenty of luck, pluck, talent, and grit to get this far. And that portends a Hollywood ending". Houston Bone (initially credited as "M. H. Murray") co-created the series with Sara Tamosauskas. Bone began working on the concept in 2013 when he was 19 years old and in film school. When interviewed about his inspirations for Teenagers, Bone said:

I think John Hughes wrote teenage characters so honestly and authentically, but something has gotten lost in translation since then. Today, it feels like a lot of teenage characters are written very clean or flashy and that just wasn’t my reality growing up in the new millennium. Growing up is messy.

Speaking to IndieWire, Bone claimed that he created the series as a response to "white-washed" teen-driven television series that he watched while growing up, such as One Tree Hill; he also criticized what he perceived as a lack of people of color and LGBTQ characters on television that weren't "evil, damaged, or hyper-sexualized". Bone has cited Issa Rae's web series The Misadventures of Awkward Black Girl and Larry Clark's 1995 film Kids as inspirations for the series.

The first season had a budget of only $3,000. All three seasons of the series were filmed in and around Toronto and Mississauga on a shoe-string budget. The first two seasons of the series were funded "out of pocket". Bone approached actor Emmanuel Kabongo with the scripts and asked him to help produce the series, and they subsequently cast the rest of the characters together using actors from Toronto. Sara Tamosauskas co-wrote the first season alongside Bone. Kabongo served as executive producer for the first season, in addition to acting in all three seasons of the series.

For the second and third seasons of the series, Orphan Black director T.J. Scott served as executive producer. Garrett Hnatiuk, who portrays Porky in the series, co-wrote the second season with Bone. Bone wrote the third season by himself.

== Plot ==
The series presents various storylines and characters in the form of vignettes. The central storylines of the first season revolve around Bree (Chloe Rose), who loses her virginity to someone with chlamydia, and T (Emmanuel Kabongo), who struggles with racism and bullying. The first season also focuses on a love triangle between T, Olive (Dana Solomon), and Jeremy (Nick Stojanovic), while the second and third seasons focus more on the female characters in the series, most notably a lesbian relationship between Olive and Sara (Allyson Pratt).

== Cast and characters ==
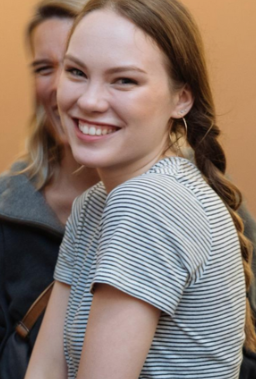
Chloe Rose received several award nominations for her performance as Bree in all three seasons of Teenagers.

| Actor | Character | Seasons | | |
| Actor | Character | 1 | 2 | 3 |
|---|---|---|---|---|
| Chloe Rose | Bree | Main | Main | Main |
| Emmanuel Kabongo | T | Main | Main | Main |
| Dana Solomon (initially credited as "Dana Jeffrey") | Olive | Main | Main | Main |
| Allyson Pratt | Sara | Main | Main | Main |
| Nykeem Provo | Ash | Main | Recurring | |
| Nick Stojanovic | Jeremy | Main | | |
| Raymond Ablack | Gabriel | Recurring | Main | Main |
| Garrett Hnatiuk | Porky | Recurring | Main | Main |
| Jordan Johnson-Hinds | Ryan | Recurring | | Guest |
| Arlene Duncan | Sandra | Recurring | Recurring | Recurring |
| Matilda Davidson | Molly | | Recurring | Main |
| Shailene Garnett | Adele | | Recurring | Recurring |
| Daniel Kelly | Roman | | Recurring | |
| Ron Dias | Jackson | | Recurring | |
| Matt Murray | Marcus | | | Recurring |
| Raevv'n Leedham | Raven | | | Recurring |
| Adam Murciano | Sal | | | Recurring |
| Cleo Tellier | Florence | | | Recurring |
| Soma Chhaya (initially credited as "Soma Bhatia") | Vesper | | | Recurring |
| Samora Smallwood | Mrs. Diaz | Guest | | |
| Kelly McCormack | Emily | Guest | | |

== Release ==
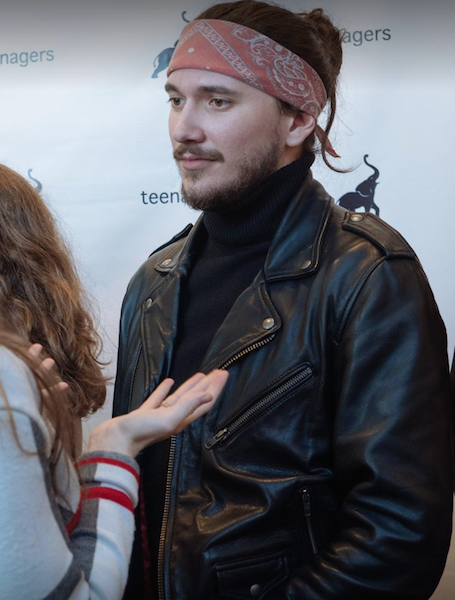
Bone at a 2017 screening of Teenagers in Toronto

=== Season 1 ===
Season 1 was filmed in early 2013, and the first teaser was released on December 1, 2013.

The January 19, 2014 premiere was covered by online blogs as well as traditional media outlets in Toronto.

=== Season 2 ===
The first episode of the second season premiered online July 26, 2015, and subsequently went viral.

=== Season 3 ===
On November 16, 2016, a prologue episode was released on YouTube, alongside an Indiegogo campaign, seeking funds to complete the third season. The third season was released online November 5, 2017.

== Reception ==
=== Critical response ===
Teenagers has received positive reviews from critics and has frequently been compared to the Degrassi franchise and the UK television series Skins. In an interview with CBC's q radio show, Bone refuted Degrassi comparisons, saying that while he "respects" the show, he believes that Teenagers is "a fresh take on that experience". Further, CBC wrote: "Bone ... is telling gritty and authentic stories about teens because he believes we gloss over youth and under represent the realities of young people living on the margins of mainstream society".

Now called the series "addicting", "sexy", and "provocative", concluding that "because it’s not held hostage by the same rules as big network television shows, it pushes the boundaries". Patrick Dennis Jr. of Urbanology Magazine dubbed it "Degrassi meets HBO". Susie Stone of culturestarved.com wrote: "I saw humans. Shattering and trembling, but at times so quiet and beautifully real. I saw short spurts of what is really happening in the teen world. This series is evocative, sweet, daring, and scary". Kyrie Scarce of TalkNerdyWithUs.com wrote: "If the story elements of sex, drugs, and wild parties sound too familiar, don’t worry—the joy of Teenagers lies in its execution, where psychological honesty is the name of the game". Jen McNeely of shedoesthecity.com described the cinematography and post-production as "slick and impressive".

=== Accolades ===
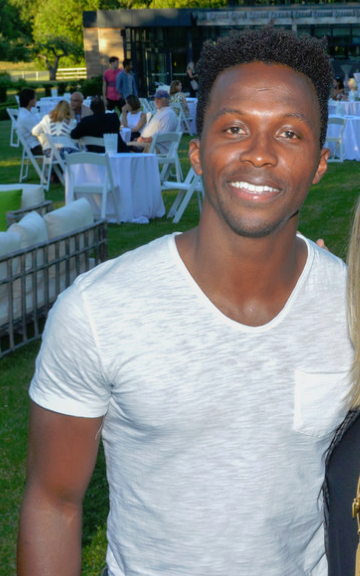
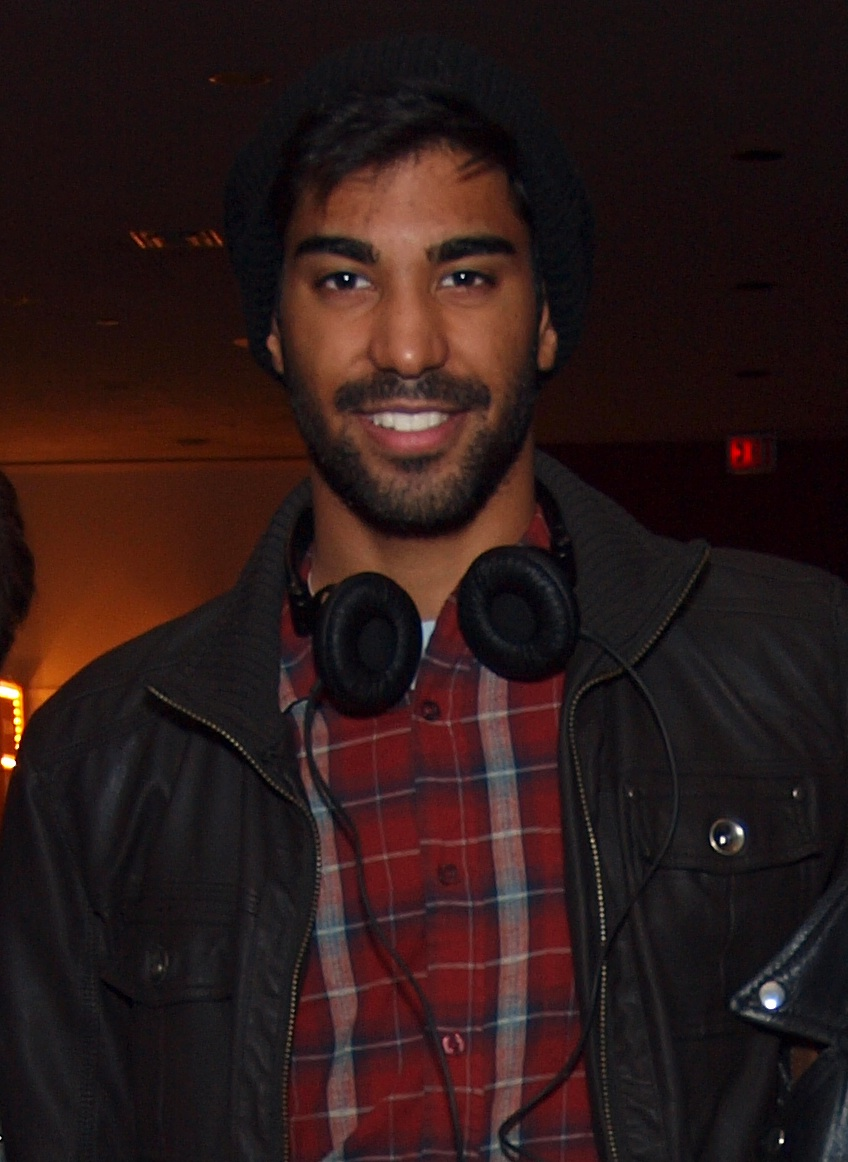
For their work in the second season of Teenagers, Emmanuel Kabongo (left) received his first Canadian Screen Award nomination, while Raymond Ablack (right) won an Indie Series Award.

Since its release, Teenagers has won several accolades. In 2016, Bone and Hnatiuk won the award for Best Screenplay at the Vancouver Web Series Festival and Ablack won the Indie Series Award for Best Supporting Actor – Drama. Kabongo was nominated for Best Performance in a Series Produced for Digital Media by the Academy of Canadian Cinema and Television for his work in the second season. In 2017, the series received six IAWTV Award nominations.

In 2018, the series received three nominations at the 9th annual Indie Series Awards, including Best Drama Series. Also that year, at the 5th annual Vancouver Web Series Festival, Teenagers won the award for Best Canadian Series, which came with a $5,000 prize.

| Year | Association | Category | Nominee(s) | Result | Ref. |
|---|---|---|---|---|---|
| 2014 | Los Angeles Web Series Festival | Outstanding Writing in a Drama Series | Houston Bone Sara Tamosauskas | Won | |
| 2014 | Los Angeles Web Series Festival | Outstanding Drama Series | Teenagers | Won | |
| 2015 | International Academy of Web Television | Best Female Performance – Drama | Chloe Rose | Nominated | |
| 2015 | Los Angeles Web Series Festival | Outstanding Drama Series | Teenagers | Nominated | |
| 2015 | Los Angeles Web Series Festival | Outstanding Directing in a Drama Series | Houston Bone | Nominated | |
| 2015 | Los Angeles Web Series Festival | Outstanding Lead Actress in a Drama Series | Chloe Rose | Nominated | |
| 2016 | Indie Series Awards | Best Ensemble – Drama | Main cast | Nominated | |
| 2016 | Indie Series Awards | Best Lead Actress – Drama | Chloe Rose | Nominated | |
| 2016 | Indie Series Awards | Best Supporting Actor – Drama | Raymond Ablack | Won | |
| 2016 | Indie Series Awards | Best Supporting Actress – Drama | Allyson Pratt | Nominated | |
| 2016 | Vancouver Web Series Festival | Best Drama Series | Teenagers | Nominated | |
| 2016 | Vancouver Web Series Festival | Best Screenplay | Houston Bone Garrett Hnatiuk | Won | |
| 2016 | Vancouver Web Series Festival | Best Actress | Chloe Rose | Nominated | |
| 2016 | Canadian Screen Awards | Best Performance in a Program or Series Produced for Digital Media | Emmanuel Kabongo | Nominated | |
| 2017 | Vancouver Web Series Festival | Best Drama Series | Teenagers | Nominated | |
| 2017 | International Academy of Web Television | Best Director – Drama | Houston Bone | Nominated | |
| 2017 | International Academy of Web Television | Best Female Performance – Drama | Chloe Rose | Nominated | |
| 2017 | International Academy of Web Television | Best Female Performance – Drama | Dana Solomon | Nominated | |
| 2017 | International Academy of Web Television | Best Male Performance – Drama | Emmanuel Kabongo | Nominated | |
| 2017 | International Academy of Web Television | Best Male Performance – Drama | Raymond Ablack | Nominated | |
| 2017 | International Academy of Web Television | Best Ensemble – Drama | Main cast | Nominated | |
| 2018 | Indie Series Awards | Best Drama Series | Teenagers | Nominated | |
| 2018 | Indie Series Awards | Best Ensemble – Drama | Main cast | Nominated | |
| 2018 | Indie Series Awards | Best Supporting Actor – Drama | Raymond Ablack | Nominated | |
| 2018 | HollyWeb Festival | Best Ensemble Cast | Teenagers | Won | |
| 2018 | Vancouver Web Series Festival | Best Drama Series | Teenagers | Nominated | |
| 2018 | Vancouver Web Series Festival | Best Screenplay | Houston Bone | Nominated | |
| 2018 | Vancouver Web Series Festival | Best Actress | Chloe Rose | Nominated | |
| 2018 | Vancouver Web Series Festival | Best Canadian Series | Houston Bone Sara Tamosauskas | Won | |
