= Unless (film) =

- Directed by: Alan Gilsenan
- Written by: Alan Gilsenan
- Starring: Catherine Keener; Hannah Gross
- Release date: September 11, 2016 (TIFF)
- Running time: 90 minutes
- Countries: Canada; Ireland
- Language: English

Unless is a Canadian-Irish drama film, which premiered at the 2016 Toronto International Film Festival. Based on the novel Unless by Carol Shields, the film was directed by Alan Gilsenan.

The film stars Catherine Keener as Reta, a successful writer struggling to deal with her daughter Norah's (Hannah Gross) decision to drop out of college and live on the streets. The cast also includes Brendan Coyle, Matt Craven, Chloe Rose, Hanna Schygulla, Martha Henry, Linda Kash, Yanna McIntosh, and Kathryn Greenwood.

== Cast ==
- Hannah Gross as Norah Winters
- Catherine Keener as Reta Winters
- Matt Craven as Tom Winters
- August Winter as Natalie Winters (credited as Abigail Winter)
- Chloe Rose as Christine Winters
- Martha Henry as Lois Winters
- Dewshane Williams as Ben Abbot
- William Webster as Professor Hamilton
- Linda Kash as Tessa Karels
- Hanna Schygulla as Danielle Westerman
- Yanna McIntosh as Cery Arnaud
- Robert Nasmith as Baby Moon McFadden
- Dylan Harman as Jim Halliday
- Kathryn Greenwood as Willow Halliday
- Mateo Galindo Torres as Jonas
- Brendan Coyle as Casper Brown
- Olivia Scriven as Tracy Halliday
- Benjamin Ayres as Arthur Springer
- Nicholas Campbell as The Stranger
- Christine Horne as Dr. Devita
- David Richmond-Peck as Detective
- Shadow as Pat The Dog
