= Fondi '91 =

- Film poster
- Directed by: Dev Khanna
- Written by: Dev Khanna; André Bharti; Lenny Foreht
- Produced by: Dev Khanna; André Bharti; Lenny Foreht
- Starring: Raymond Ablack; Mylène St-Sauveur; Kyle Kirkpatrick; Thomas Wesson
- Release date: 13 April 2013
- Running time: 81 minutes
- Languages: English, Italian

Fondi '91 is a 2013 feature film set in Fondi, Italy, directed by Dev Khanna and starring Canadian actor Raymond Ablack. The film received mixed reviews from critics upon release.

== Plot ==
Fondi '91 follows the lustful adventures of Anil and his Jersey-based high school soccer team's two week trip to the town of Fondi, Italy.

== Reception ==
The National Post called the film "A nice-looking coming-of-age film that doesn't quite get there." NOW Magazine wrote a negative review: "A certain sensitivity and intelligence are required to deal with rape on film. Fondi '91 exhibits little of either, which is why it ends up being shocking, exploitative and profoundly infuriating."

In a mixed review, Toronto Film Scene wrote: "What starts out as a coming of age story from the point of view of four high school boys, each with their own varying levels of testosterone fueled sexual desire, quickly breaks down into a confused story of sexual assault, misguided guilt, and incredibly awkward and unbelievable sexual encounters. It’s a bit of a shame as well, since the first thirty minutes of Fondi '91 is actually a lot of fun."
