= Rachel Wilson =

Canadian actress (born 1977)

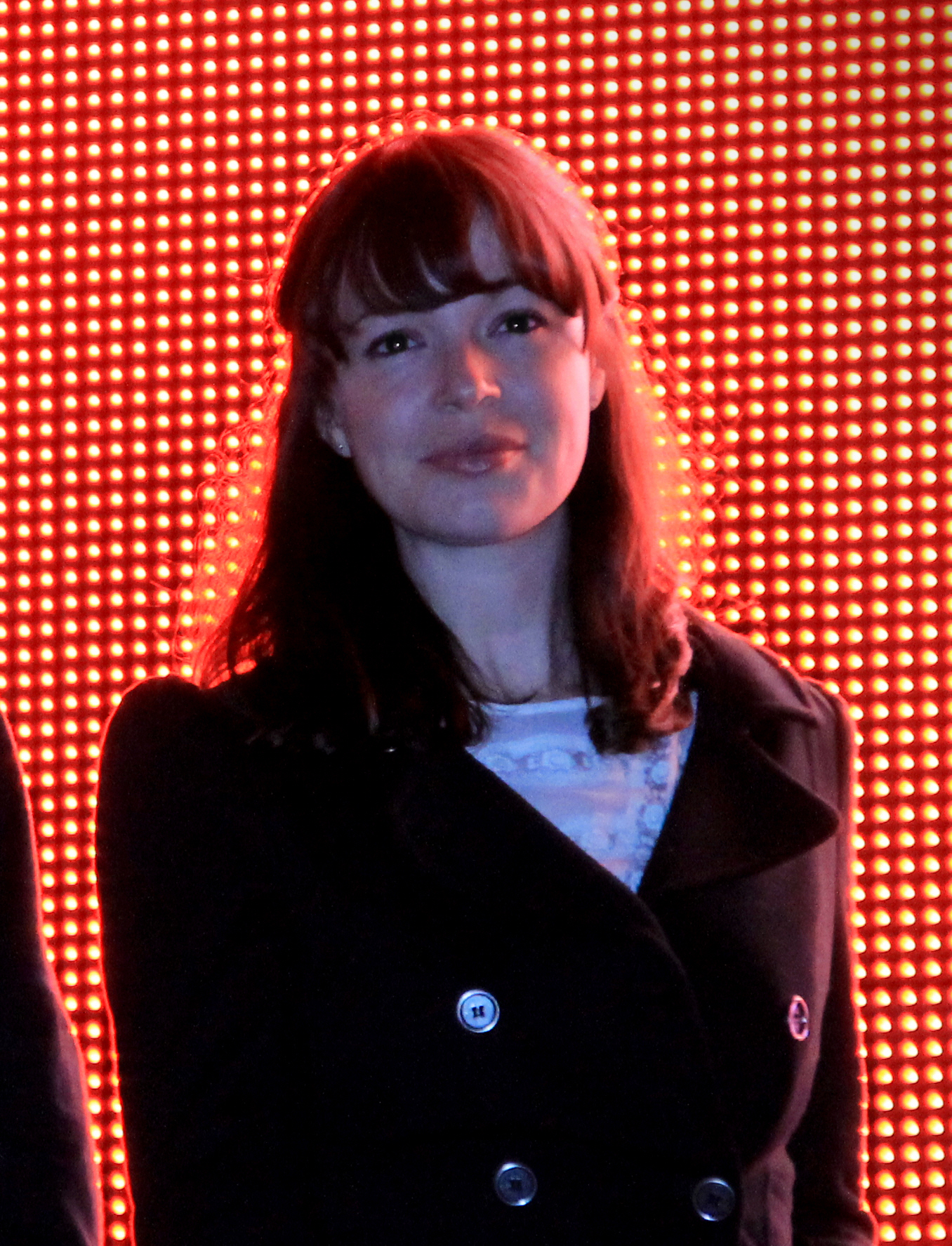
- Wilson in June 2012
- Born: Rachel Alexandra Wilson; May 12, 1977 (age 49); Ottawa, Ontario, Canada
- Occupation: Actress
- Years active: 1991–present

Rachel Alexandra Wilson (born May 12, 1977) is a Canadian actress. She is best known for her roles as Heather in Total Drama and Tamira Goldstein in Breaker High.

== Life and career ==
Wilson was born in Ottawa, Ontario. She started acting at age 12, working extensively in Toronto, Vancouver and Los Angeles. Wilson's roles include Dr. Nikki Renholds on CBC's Republic of Doyle, Donna on the web series "My Pal Satan", and leads in St. Roz, Puck Hogs, Man v. Minivan, and 75 El Camino (the latter two were accepted at the 2009 Toronto International Film Festival). Television credits include The Two Mr. Kissels for Lifetime, Breaker High, Kevin Hill, Judging Amy, Charmed, Show Me Yours, Gideon's Crossing, and Hellions. Wilson also voices the character of Heather in Total Drama.

== Filmography ==
=== Film ===
Year	Title	Role	Notes
1995	Jungleground	Posie	
1995	National Lampoon's Senior Trip	Susie	
1999	Austin Powers: The Spy Who Shagged Me	Woody Harrelson Fan	
1999	Anywhere but Here	Sylvia	
1999	Mystery, Alaska	Marla Burns	
1999	Soft Toilet Seats	Interface Room Dancer	
2001	The Zeros	Fanny	
2001	The Glass House	Hannah	
2003	Winter Break	Kirsten Benston	
2003	Negative	Julia Waters	Short film
2006	Waitin' to Live	Ellie Cassidy	
2006	Monkey Warfare	Bike Girl	
2008	Hooked on Speedman	Michelle	
2009	St. Roz	Judy Gold	
2009	75 El Camino	Nicole	Short film
2009	Puck Hogs	Caroline	
2009	Man v. Minivan	Jen	Short film
2010	Not Over Easy	Karen	Short film
2010	Saw 3D	Mother	
2011	Unlucky	Sarah	
2012	And Now a Word from Our Sponsor	Mary	Completed
2012	Terminal		Short film, completed
2012	Margo Lily	Danielle	Short film, completed
2012	Final View	The Bereaved	Short film, completed
2015	Hellions	Kate Vogel	
2018	Backstabbing for Beginners	Lily	
2019	In the Tall Grass	Natalie Humboldt	
2020	Come Play	Jennifer	
2023	Dear David	Linda	
2024	The Invisibles	Kara	

=== Television ===
Year	Title	Role	Notes
1994	Kung Fu: The Legend Continues		Episode: "Enter the Tiger"
1995	Side Effects	Allison Lounsbery	Episode: "Snap, Crackle, Pop!"
1995	Lonesome Dove: The Outlaw Years	Holly	Episode: "The Bride"
1996	A Brother's Promise: The Dan Jansen Story	Stacy	TV movie
1996	A Husband, a Wife and a Lover	Sarah	TV movie
1997	Ready or Not	Milan's Girl	Episode: "Hello, Goodbye"
1997	Jonovision		Episode: "Jono's Slam Jam"
1997–1998	Breaker High	Tamira Goldstein	44 episodes
1999	Sagamore	Audrey March	TV movie
2000	The Others	Tandi	Episode: "Souls on Board"
2000	Running Mates	Heather Gable	TV movie
2001	Popular	Flynn Hudson	Episode: "It's Greek to Me"
2001	Gideon's Crossing	Joanne Cooper	5 episodes
2001	Charmed	Becca	Episode: "Brain Drain"
2002	Providence	Karina	Episode: "The Whole Truth"
2002	Judging Amy	Colleen Wharton	Episode: "Come Back Soon"
2003	Missing	Karen Owen	Episode: "Thin Air"
2004–2005	Show Me Yours	Stella Bradley	16 episodes
2005	Sonny by Dawn	Nathalie	TV movie
2005	Kevin Hill	Bethany Phillips	Episode: "Man's Best Friend"
2007	6teen	Melinda Wilson (voice)	Episode "Silent Butt Deadly"
2007–2013	Total Drama	Heather (voice)	81 episodes
2008	The Two Mr. Kissels	Melinda	TV movie
2009	My Pal Satan	Donna	6 episodes
2010–2014	Republic of Doyle	Dr. Nikki Renholds	Recurring role Nominated – Gemini Award for Best Performance by an Actress in a Featured Supporting Role in a Dramatic Series
2011	Murdoch Mysteries	Tess Moffatt	Episode: "Dial M for Murdoch"
2011	The Kennedys	Michelle	TV miniseries
2011	Certain Prey	Heather's mother	TV movie
2012	Comedy Bar	Chris O'Donnell	Episode: "4"; Episode: "5"
2012	The Firm	Anna	Episode: "Chapter Twelve"
2012	Baby's First Christmas	Jenna	TV movie
2013	Bomb Girls	Teresa	4 episodes
2014	The Good Witch's Wonder	Audrey	TV movie
2014	Covert Affairs	Nurse Susan	2 episodes
2015	Reign	Lady Yvonne	Episode: "Banished"
2015	Reel East Coast	Karen	Episode #1.1
2015	Spun Out	Paula Rice	Episode: "When Beckett Met Stephie "
2016	Saving Hope	River Wallace	Episode: "Anybody Seen My Baby"
2017	Schitt's Creek	Motel Guest	Episode: "Stop Saying Lice!"
2017	Private Eyes	Jacinta Kalfas	Episode: "Six Feet Blunder"
2018	Carter	Angelica Holander	Episode: "Pig, Man, Lion"
2018–2019	Impulse	Iris	recurring role, 7 episodes
2019	Best Intentions	Tinder Date	Episode: "Pilot"
2021	Hudson & Rex	Melina	Episode: "Sleeping Beauty"
2022	Murdoch Mysteries	Charlotte Hennessey	Season 15 episode 12: "There's Something About Mary"
