= Slaight Family Music Lab =

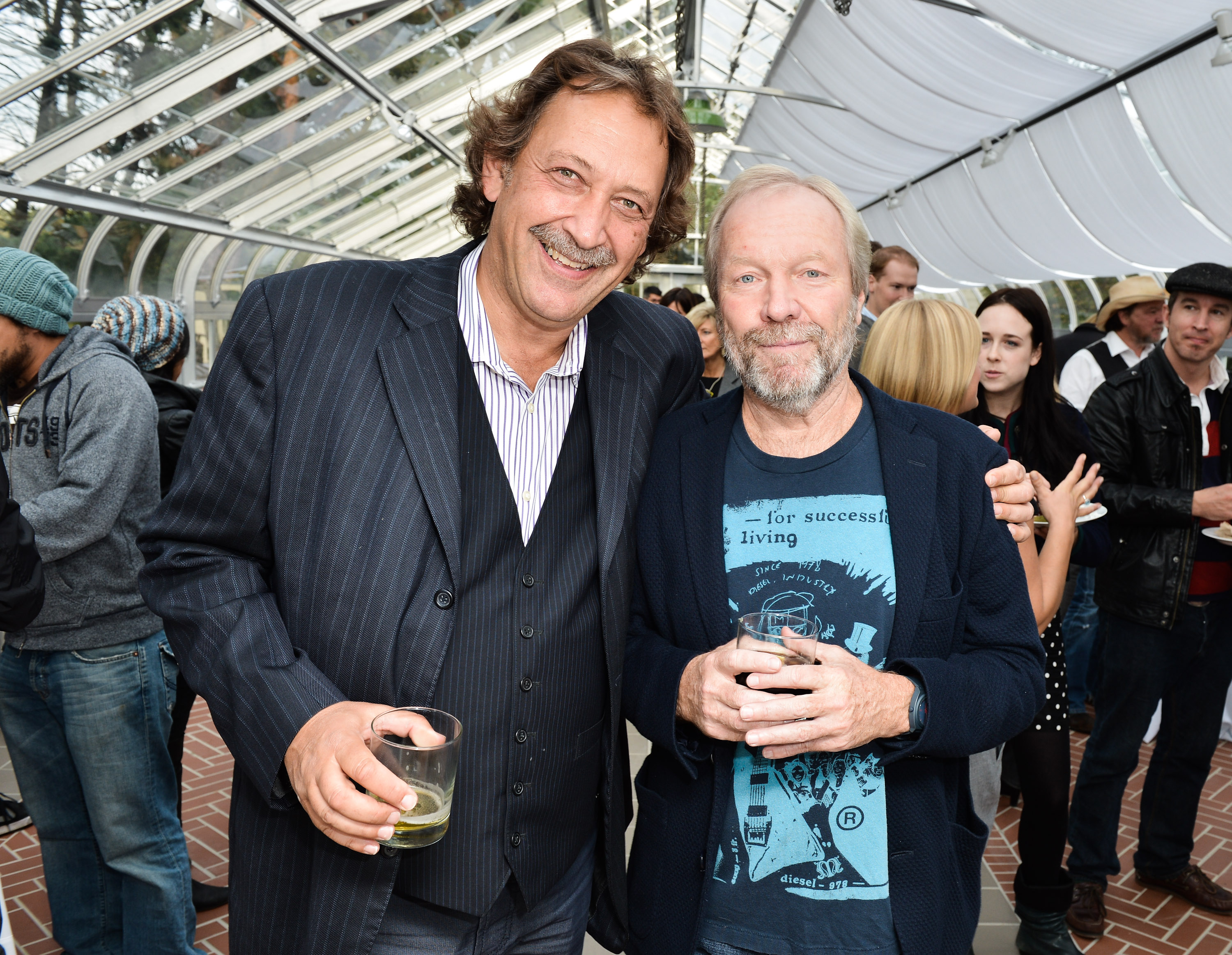
Gary Slaight, of the Slaight Family Foundation, and Slawko Klymkiw of the Canadian Film Centre, at the launch of Slaight Music Residency.

The Canadian Film Centre opened the Slaight Family Music Lab in 2013, sponsored by the Slaight Family Foundation. Every year a small group of promising composers and song-writers are invited to study under a distinguished composer.

The first mentor was Howard Shore, who composed the music for many films, including Marc Jordan was the mentor in 2014.

residents of the Slaight Music Residency include
image	year	name	notes
	2013	Jeff Morrow	
	2013	Allie X	
	2013	Todor Kobakov	
		Adaline	
	2013	Erica Procunier	
	2013	Matthew O'Halloran	
		Jillea	
		Robyn Dell'Unto	
		Lora Bidner	
		Virginia Kilbertus	
		Jonathan Kawchuk	
		Sarah Slean	
	2016	Aimee Bessada	Scored multiple film and television projects, including: How To Buy A Baby, Irreplaceable You, Nappily Ever After, The Inherent Traits of Connor James, Holly Hobbie.
		Laura Barrett	Film scores include: Erin's Guide To Kissing Girls, Birdland, The Wanderer, Porch Stories, The Hall.
	2014	Michael Peter Olsen	
		Dillon Baldassero	
	2016	Spencer Creaghan	
		Kayla Diamond	
		Sam Drysdale	
	2016	Rebecca Everett	
		Ben Fox	
		Giacomo Gianniotti	
	2016	Neil Haverty	
		Liam Russell	
	2016	Chris Reineck	
		Tomi Swick	
		Theo Tams	
