= Peter DaCunha =

Canadian actor

- Born: April 12, 2003 (age 22); Toronto, Canada
- Occupation: Actor
- Years active: 2011–present

External image
- DaCunha in 2022

Peter DaCunha is a Portuguese-Canadian actor best known for his roles as Mason in Home Alone: The Holiday Heist (2012), Remi Vogel in Bruce McDonald's thriller film Hellions (2015) and Tyler in the acclaimed Atom Egoyan drama Remember (2015).

He also participated in the TV show Reign as Prince Charles. He also has a recurring role as Samuel Ramse on Season 2 of the 12 Monkeys television series.

== Filmography ==
=== Film ===
Year	Title	Role	Notes
2011	In a Family Way	Baby Oliver	Voice
2012	A Dark Truth	Jason Begosian	
2012	The Barrens	Danny Vineyard	
2013	Haunter	Robbie	
2013	Torment	Liam Morgan	
2015	Hellions	Remi Vogel	
2015	The Waiting Room	Soccer boy	
2015	Remember	Tyler	
2017	XX	Danny Jacobs	

=== Television ===
Year	Title	Role	Notes
2011	Rookie Blue	Elliot Walker	Episode: "Best Laid Plans"
2011	Alphas	Teddy	Episode: "A Short Time in Paradise"
2011	Against the Wall	Jason	Episode: "Wonder What God's Up To"
2011	Mistletoe Over Manhattan	Travis Martel	Television film
2012	Frenemies	George O'Neal	Television film
2012	Life with Boys	Amusement park kid	Episode: "Bathroom Battles with Boys"
2012	The Listener	Dustin Lamb	Episode: "Captain Nightfall"
2012	Flashpoint	Curtis Rogan	Episode: "No Kind of Life"
2012	Home Alone: The Holiday Heist	Mason	Television film
2012–2015	Rick Mercer Report	Rick's Son	7 episodes
2013	Pete's Christmas	Kenny Kidder	Television film
2013	Holidaze	Jake	Television film
2013	Ella the Elephant	Sammy	Episode: 'Ella's Special Delivery/Frankie's Perfect Pumpkin"
2013–2014	Reign	Charles	4 episodes
2015	Defiance	Young Datak	Episode: 'My Name Is Datak Tarr and I Have Come to Kill You"
2016	Saving Hope	Mordecai Poplar	Episode: "You Can't Always Get What You Want"
2016	Murdoch Mysteries	Ewan Gallacher	Episode: "House of Industry"
2016	A Perfect Christmas	Brian	Television film
2016	Mr. D	Hayden	Episode: "Gerry Gets a Kid"
2016–2018	12 Monkeys	Samuel Ramse	10 episodes
2017	Mommy's Little Boy	Eric Wilson	Television film
2017	Dark Matter	Ethan	Episode: "Isn't That a Paradox?"
