= Or So the Story Goes =

Web series created by Melissa Malone

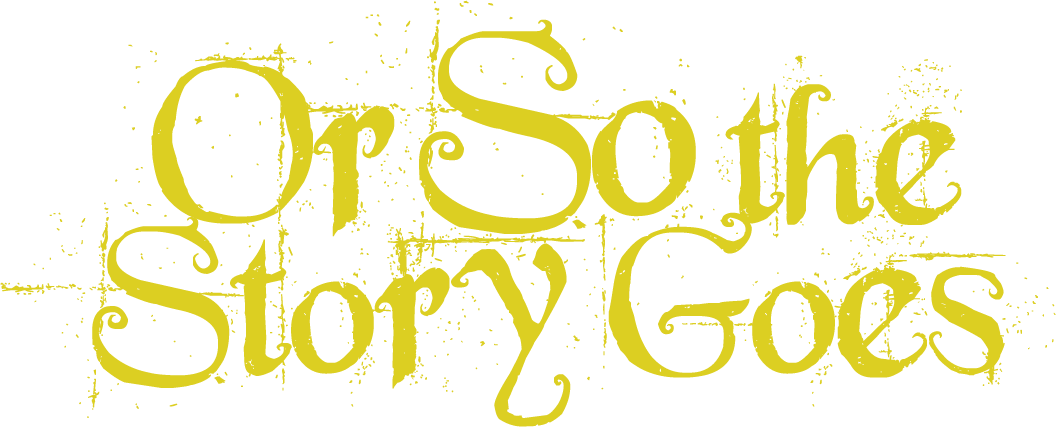
- Also known as: OSTSG
- Genre: Horror
- Created by: Melissa Malone
- Written by: Melissa Malone; Theresa Labreglio; Bryan Civitarese
- Directed by: Theresa Labreglio
- Starring: Rainni Moran; Melissa Malone; Hank Morris; Diann Gogerty; Bryan Civitarese; Rayna Loos; Penelope Hinds; Joe Lenihan; Julia Bushman; Josh Pickel; Noah Dunton; Chris Christiana; Tessa Zugmeyer
- Theme music composer: Judith Avers
- Opening theme: Happily Ever After
- Composers: Judith Avers; Trent Campbell
- Country of origin: United States
- Original language: English
- No. of seasons: 5
- No. of episodes: 30

Production
- Cinematography: Trevor Peckham; James Reslier-Wells
- Camera setup: Single-camera
- Production company: Outtake Productions

Or So the Story Goes is a web series created by Melissa Malone. As a horror anthology, each season brings to life a classic children's tale with a dark, modern twist; including Little Red Riding Hood, Peter Pan, Hansel and Gretel, Rumplestiltskin, and Jack and the Beanstalk.

== Origin ==
Or So the Story Goes began as a teen outreach project to teach teen filmmaking. The groups' summer project would become the first season of the series, Little Rosemary. After minor success of the short, 3 part first season- a crew was put together and production of the official web series began- still using teens in the cast and crew.

== Seasons ==
Little Rosemary Based on Little Red Riding Hood. 12 Year-Old Hazel investigates the disappearance of her old friend, Rosemary. When Rosemary returns to town she is changed and seems to be leading many of the town's residents in a strange new cult.

This season stars Rainni Moran, Lilla Cabrera, Penelope Hinds, Blake Weissman and Melissa Malone.

Happy Thoughts Based on Peter Pan. The Darling family moves to a new home in a new town hoping for a fresh start. They soon discover it is already by the ghost of a psychotic teenage boy and his previous victims- and he has a new obsession with their teenage daughter, Wendy.

This season is a paranormal horror and stars Noah Dunton, Melissa Malone, Rayna Loos, Hank Morris, Joe Lenihan, Diann Gogerty, Abigail Friend and Bryan Civitarese.

Sweet Truth Based on Hansel & Gretel. Teen Vlogger Gretel and her best friend Hansel have only one goal- get as many views on their web show as possible. However, instead of a local party, they find themselves lost and at the mercy of a strange woman that lives in the woods.

This season is a found footage horror and stars Julia Bushman, Josh Elliott Pickel, Heather Girardi, Rainni Moran and Abigail Friend.

Golden Rule Based on Rumplestiltskin. The residents of a small town find themselves on edge and fighting for their lives when a masked serial killer goes on a spree.

This season is a teen slasher and stars Rainni Moran, Melissa Malone, Hank Morris, Bryan Civitarese, Colmcille Donston, Diann Gogerty, Rayna Loos, Joe Lenihan, Penelope Hinds, Chris Christiana and Andreas Wyder.

Knock Knock Based on Jack and the Beanstalk. After the death of his father, Jack Jacobs goes to extremes to help his family find the money to keep their home- but it comes with a terrible price.

This season is a home invasion horror and stars Joe Lenihan, Penelope Hinds, Melissa Malone, Diann Gogerty, Hank Morris, Rainni Moran, Tessa Zugmeyer, Bryan Civitarese and Daron Seaford.

The Jolly Rogers Case Files A short comedic spin off from the Happy Thoughts season. The series follows Jane Hook and the Jolly Rogers in their misadventures in ghost hunting. The spin off has two seasons and stars Melissa Malone, Diann Gogerty, Bryan Civitarese and Chris Christiana.

== Broadcast ==
The series premiered in September 2013 on YouTube and on the series official site. The latest season, Golden Rule is available for streaming on SeekaTV via the website, Roku and Apple TV.

== Awards ==
Wins

- Best Horror Series Vancouver Web Series Festival ("Sweet Truth")
- Best Original Song Indie Series Awards 2016 ("Happily Ever After" by Judith Avers)
- Best Horror Series Minnesota Web Fest 2017 ("Golden Rule")
- Best Teen Series Baltimore Web Fest 2017 ("Golden Rule")
- Best Soundtrack Indie Series Awards 2018 ("Golden Rule")

Notable Nominations

- Best Horror Series Vancouver Web Series Festival 2017 ("Happy Thoughts")
- Best Soundtrack Indie Series Awards 2016 ("Happy Thoughts")
- Best Newcomer Actress International Online Web Fest 2016 (Abigail Friend, "Happy Thoughts")
- Best New Media Performance Teen Actor Young Artist Award 2017 (Josh Elliott Pickel, "Sweet Truth")
- Best Original Song Indie Series Awards 2017 ("Loaded" by Judith Avers)
- Best Soundtrack Indie Series Awards 2017 ("Sweet Truth")
- Best Actress New Zealand Web Fest 2017 (Rainni Moran, "Golden Rule")
- Best Web Series International Online Web Fest 2017 ("Golden Rule")
- Best Screenplay International Online Web Fest 2017 ("Golden Rule")
- Best Horror Series Vancouver Web Series Festival 2018
- Best Original Song Indie Series Awards 2018 ("45" by Judith Avers)
- Best Supporting Actor in a Drama Indie Series Awards 2018 (Andrea Wyder, "Golden Rule")
- Best Series die Seriale 2018 ("Golden Rule")
- Best Original Song die Seriale 2018 ("3,2,1" by Judith Avers)
- Best Screenplay die Seriale 2018 ("Golden Rule")
- Best New Media Performance Young Artist Awards 2018 (Rainni Moran, "Golden Rule")
