= Hellions (film) =

- Theatrical release poster
- Directed by: Bruce McDonald
- Written by: Pascal Trottier
- Produced by: Paul Lenart; Frank Siracusa
- Starring: Chloe Rose; Rossif Sutherland; Rachel Wilson; Peter DaCunha; Luke Bilyk; Robert Patrick
- Cinematography: Norayr Kasper
- Edited by: Duff Smith
- Music by: Todor Kobakov; Ian LeFeuvre
- Production companies: Storyteller Pictures; Whizbang Films
- Distributed by: IFC Midnight
- Release dates: January 25, 2015 (Sundance Film Festival); September 25, 2015 (Canada)
- Running time: 81 minutes
- Country: Canada
- Language: English

Hellions is a 2015 Canadian horror film directed by Bruce McDonald, written by Pascal Trottier and starring Chloe Rose. The film was an official selection of the 2015 Sundance Film Festival lineup and also screened at the 2015 Toronto International Film Festival.

== Plot ==
Dora (Chloe Rose) is an average teenager who just wants to have fun and get high with her boyfriend, Jace (Luke Bilyk), the day of Halloween. She is stunned when her doctor, Henry (Rossif Sutherland), tells her that she is four weeks pregnant, something she says should not be possible. Distraught, Dora goes home to wait for Jace to pick her up for a Halloween party while her mother (Rachel Wilson) takes her younger brother, Remi (Peter DaCunha), trick or treating. But before her boyfriend can pick her up, Dora is visited by several children in strange costumes. Their presence is increasingly threatening, culminating with one carrying the severed head of Jace in a bag. Dora must fight the monstrous children, who want her unborn child, a feat made more difficult by the fact that her pregnancy is progressing at a very fast and unnatural pace.

== Cast ==
- Chloe Rose as Dora Vogel
- Rossif Sutherland as Dr. Henry
- Rachel Wilson as Kate Vogel
- Peter DaCunha as Remi Vogel
- Luke Bilyk as Jace
- Robert Patrick as Mike Corman

== Reception ==
On review aggregator Rotten Tomatoes, the film holds an approval rating of 33% based on 33 reviews with an average rating of 4.7/10. Metacritic gives the film a weighted average score of 34 out of 100, based on 8 critics, indicating "generally unfavorable reviews".

The Hollywood Reporter and IndieWire criticized both the film and its direction. The reviewers felt that although Hellions showed promise, it ultimately did not live up to its potential. The A.V. Club named it #3 on its list of 20 worst movies of 2015.

At the same time, horror websites such as Shock Till You Drop and Bloody Disgusting reviewed it favorably and both outlets praised the film for its imagery and cinematic inventiveness. Simon Abrams of RogerEbert.com also commended the film, calling it a "perfect, light midnight movie" that, despite its shortcomings, "gets the job done".

The Blu-ray release of Hellions was called a "must-add" to everybody's October watch list by Bloody Disgusting.

== See also ==
- List of films featuring home invasions
