= Guilty at 17 =

- Directed by: Matt West; Divya D'Souza; Joseph J. Gillanders
- Starring: Erin Sanders; Chloe Rose; Rob Stewart; Alex Paxton-Beesley; Vanessa Morgan; Michael Woods; Catherine Dent; Zack Peladeau
- Country of origin: Canada
- Original language: English

Original release
- Network: Lifetime
- Release: 2014

Guilty at 17 is a 2014 Canadian drama film starring Erin Sanders and Chloe Rose. It was directed by Matt West, Divya D'Souza and Joseph J. Gillanders. It premiered on the Lifetime channel in 2014.

== Plot ==
A high school chemistry teacher named Gilbert Adkins is accused by one of his students, Devon Cavanor, of sexual assault. Devon persuades a new classmate, Traci Scott, to back up her story by lying that she witnessed the assault. Gilbert is arrested by the police. It is later revealed that Devon was lying from the start; she had been promised a car by her father if she achieved good grades and passed her college admissions exam, but had failed an exam and complained that Gilbert had not given her enough time to prepare. Gilbert also suspects that Devon had broken his laptop.

Gilbert has spent 30 years building his career as a teacher and is concerned that it may all be wasted because of the allegations brought forth by Devon. His half-brother and his daughter, June Gailey, both promise to support him. Gilbert visits Traci's father Don to tell him of the seriousness of his position and to ask him to get Traci to recant her story, which Gilbert tells him is false. Don asks Traci, who insists that she was telling the truth. However, Traci has doubts when she discovers from a friend that Devon has been known to lie in the past.

June flies home from Uganda, only to find that Gilbert is suspected to have committed suicide by jumping off a bridge. A suicide note, which had been typed on a computer, is found in his car nearby. June cannot believe that her father would do this and suspects that he was murdered. Her suspicion is reinforced when she later discovers that Gilbert's laptop contained no such note. With the help of her old friend Scott, June becomes a substitute teacher at her father's school to get more information.

Traci is upset when she learns of Gilbert's death and confronts Devon, who is adamant that they both stick to their stories and that she was telling the truth about Gilbert's attack on her. Devon meets her boyfriend, Jay Allerson, to discuss the situation. It turns out that Devon not only lied about Gilbert assaulting her, but Jay came up with the plan to destroy Gilbert's laptop after stealing the college entrance exam questions from it so that Devon could pass the test, with Devon's lie being to cover their theft.

A toxicology report proves that Gilbert's body contained an overdose of a sedative when he died, indicating that he may not have committed suicide. June also discovers that Jay has a criminal record. Devon's father presents her with a brand new car after she gets a good grade by cheating on her college exam. The next time Devon meets Jay, he tells it was easier than he had thought it would be to kill Gilbert.

June reveals her identity to a guilt-ridden Traci and convinces her to come clean. When Traci sees Devon driving her new car, she confronts her again and informs her that she is going to confess everything to the police. Traci cycles to the local hospital where her father is recovering from a heart attack to inform her parents first. On her way there, Jay runs Traci off the road with his pickup truck, though she survives. A worried Devon arranges to meet June at the high school, where she promises to tell her everything. When they meet, Devon lies again by blaming Jay for the whole scheme. But Jay appears carrying a gun and protests this. Jay reveals he had injected Gilbert with the sedative overdose while he was asleep, saying he did everything for Devon. The situation intensifies and results in Jay fatally shooting himself in desperation.

In the end, Devon decides to plead guilty while Gilbert's name is posthumously cleared.

== Cast ==
- Erin Sanders as Traci Scott
- Chloe Rose as Devon Cavanor
- Rob Stewart as Gibert Adkins
- Alex Paxton-Beesley as June Gailey
- Vanessa Morgan as Leigh
- Michael Woods as Don Scott, Traci's father
- Catherine Dent as Melanie Scott, Traci's mother
- Zack Peladeau as Jay Allerson, Devon's boyfriend
- Rick Burchill as Irving Cavanor, Devon's father
