= I Don't Know Who You Are =

2023 Canadian drama film

- Theatrical release poster
- Directed by: Houston Bone
- Written by: Houston Bone; Mark Clennon; Victoria Long
- Produced by: Houston Bone; Mark Clennon; Martine Brouillet; Victoria Long
- Starring: Mark Clennon
- Cinematography: Dmitry Lopatin
- Edited by: Houston Bone
- Music by: Spencer Creaghan
- Production company: Black Elephant Productions
- Release dates: September 7, 2023 (TIFF); May 24, 2024 (United States)
- Running time: 103 minutes
- Country: Canada
- Language: English

I Don't Know Who You Are is a 2023 Canadian drama film, written, directed, and edited by Houston Bone. Bone's full-length directorial debut, the film stars Mark Clennon as Benjamin, a gay working class musician who is urgently trying to find $1,000 to pay for post-exposure prophylaxis (PEP) to protect himself from HIV after he is sexually assaulted by a stranger.

The film premiered in the Discovery program at the 2023 Toronto International Film Festival, before being picked up for theatrical distribution in 2024.

== Plot ==
Over the course of one weekend, a gay working class musician named Benjamin must urgently scrape together $1,000 to pay for post-exposure prophylaxis (PEP) to protect himself from HIV after he is sexually assaulted by a stranger.

== Cast ==
- Mark Clennon as Benjamin
- Anthony Diaz as Malcolm
- Nat Manuel as Ariel
- Deragh Campbell as Agnes
- Victoria Long as Lola
- Kevin A. Courtney as Oscar
- Michael Hogan as The Man
- Grace E. McDonald as Benjamin's mother, Angela
- Radcliffe Goldbourne as Benjamin's father, Marcus
- Randy Davis as Carl from the HIV clinic
- Cheryl Wagner as The Emergency Room Doctor
- Chris Wong as The Pharmacist
- Lawrene Denkers as Melanie
- Peyton McLean as Terrence
- Ilgi Bodan as Cassandra
- Nileigh Bodan as Tabetha
- David Draper as Paul
- Felicia Morrison as Anne
- Erik Berg as The Security Guard
- Denzel Grant as Ed

Health care workers depicted in the film are portrayed by real medical professionals involved in HIV treatment and advocacy.

== Production ==
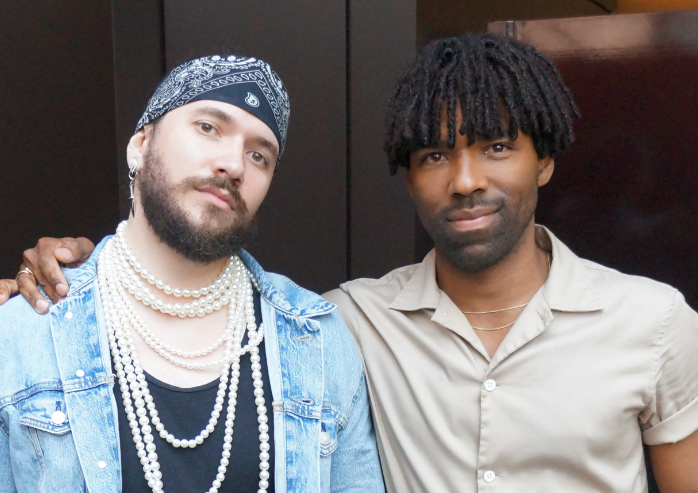
Houston Bone and Mark Clennon at the 2023 Toronto International Film Festival. I Don't Know Who You Are was their second film collaboration.

Benjamin is a reprisal of the same character Clennon previously played in Bone's 2020 short film Ghost. The screenplay is based in part on Bone's own experience having to navigate the health care system to attain PEP treatment after being sexually assaulted.

The film was co-produced by Bone and Clennon, with Martine Brouillet and Victoria Long, while Clennon and Long also served as story editors for the screenplay.

In an essay for CBC Arts, Bone described the process of making the film on a limited budget, particularly in having to shoot many of its scenes guerrilla-style without permits.

== Distribution ==
The film premiered in the Discovery program at the 2023 Toronto International Film Festival. In March 2024, the film screened at the 38th annual BFI Flare in London.

The film was picked up for distribution after its TIFF premiere, and later had a limited theatrical release in Canada and the United States in 2024.

== Critical response ==
I Don't Know Who You Are has received generally positive reviews from film critics, with particular praise for Clennon's lead performance. Critics have drawn comparisons between I Don't Know Who You Are and Cléo from 5 to 7 (1962), Uncut Gems (2019), and Never Rarely Sometimes Always (2020).

Barry Hertz of The Globe and Mail ranked the film 7th on his list of the top 10 Canadian films of 2023, describing the film as "a tremendously tense portrait of small-scale desperation" and "a seriously impressive micro-budget debut".

Adam Nayman, writing for the Toronto Star, called the film “deeply affecting” and wrote that the movie "transforms its furtive production circumstances into a fully realized style. Instead of showing the city off, it cultivates a dizzy dislocation — the paranoid sensation of being surrounded at all times without necessarily feeling connected, or of anxious walks home under flickering street-lights."

Vadim Rizov of Filmmaker Magazine felt that some scenes were “overly attenuated” but concluded that the film is "a solid feature debut" with “a strong sense of a particular micro-milieu."

Angelo Muredda of Cinema Scope described the film as "an empathetic character study that effectively balances its punchy genre elements with its human drama."

== Accolades ==
Award	Date	Category	Nominee(s)	Result	Refs
Calgary International Film Festival	2023	$10,000 RBC Emerging Artist Award	Houston Bone	Nominated	
Riviera International Film Festival	2024	Best Film	Houston Bone	Nominated	
Connecticut LGBTQ Film Festival	2024	Rising Star Award	Houston Bone	Won	
Canadian Screen Awards	2025	Best Original Score	Spencer Creaghan	Nominated	
Canadian Screen Awards	2025	Best Original Song	Mark Clennon, "I Don't Know Who You Are"	Nominated	
