= Catherine Dent =

American actress (born 14 April 1965)

- Born: Catherine Grace Dent; 1964 or 1965 (age 60–61); Baton Rouge, Louisiana, U.S.
- Education: University of North Carolina
- Occupation: Actress
- Years active: 1991–present
- Spouse: Peter Eliasberg (m. 2002)
- Children: 1

Catherine Grace Dent is an American actress. She is best known for playing Danielle "Danny" Sofer in the FX series The Shield (2002–2008) and General Hale in Agents of S.H.I.E.L.D. (2017–2018).

== Early life ==
Dent was born in Baton Rouge, Louisiana. She attended high school at Baton Rouge's St. Joseph's Academy, graduating in 1983, and later studied at the North Carolina School of the Arts, graduating in 1993.

== Career ==
Dent began starring in film and television in the early 1990s. Her first feature film was the movie Nobody's Fool (1994). On television she played Janice Talbert in One Life to Live, and made guest appearances on such shows as The Pretender, The X-Files, The Lone Gunmen, The Invisible Man, Law & Order: Special Victims Unit, The Sopranos, Frasier, Judging Amy, CSI: Crime Scene Investigation, Without a Trace, Grey's Anatomy, NCIS, and The Mentalist.

Her breakthrough role came in 2002, as LAPD Officer Danielle "Danni" Sofer on FX's hit drama The Shield. On film, she appeared in Replicant (2001), The Majestic (2001), and 21 Grams (2003). In 2002 she starred in Taken as Sally Clarke, the Emmy-winning miniseries first aired on the Sci-Fi Channel.

Between 2005 and 2014 Dent appeared in several movies including The Unseen, The Bad Son, Natalee Holloway, Duress, Finding Neighbors, and Guilty at 17.

From 2017–2018, Dent guest starred as General Hale in Agents of S.H.I.E.L.D. In February 2020, it was announced that Dent would play Jessica Wolcott in NBC's new show La Brea, though the role was ultimately played by Ione Skye. In 2021, she was a guest on Lucifer playing Dr. Alice Porter.

== Personal life ==
Dent married attorney Peter Eliasberg on March 23, 2002. They have one child.

== Filmography ==
Film
Year	Title	Role	Notes
1994	Nobody's Fool	Charlotte Sullivan	
1996	The Debutantes	Mary Cat	Short film
1997	March 29, 1979	Jane Freedman	Short film
1998	Dangerous Proposition	Laura	
1998	Jaded	Lisa Heller	
2001	Someone Like You	Alice	
2001	Replicant	Anne	
2001	It Is What It Is	Marley Weber	
2001	Venomous	Susan Edmonton	
2001	The Majestic	Mabel	
2002	Auto Focus	Susan	
2003	21 Grams	Ana	
2005	The Unseen	Ms. Lucille	
2008	Sanctuary	Sarah Hanson	
2009	Duress	Jenny	
2011	Carjacked	Therapist	
2013	Finding Neighbors	Mary	
2022	Blonde	Jean	
2022	Moving On	Molly	
2023	Rachel Hendrix	Em Evans	
2023	Candy Cane Lane	Lee	

Television
Year	Title	Role	Notes
1991	Dallas	Reporter No. 1	Episode: "Fathers and Sons and Fathers and Sons"
1993	A Girls' Guide to Sex	Tracy Pixel	TV film
1995	New York Undercover	Shirley	Episode: "Downtown Girl"
1996	High Incident		Episode: "Shake, Rattle & Roll"
1997	Crisis Center	Laura	Episode: "Someone to Watch Over Me"
1997	One Life to Live	Janice Talbert	2 episodes
1998	The Pretender	Dr. Carla Goetz	Episode: "Crazy"
1998	Frasier	Claudia Kynock	Episode: "The Seal Who Came to Dinner"
1998	Chicago Hope	Tanya Anderson	Episode: "Gun with the Wind"
1999	L.A. Doctors	Alice Field	Episode: "Denial"
1999	The X-Files	June Gurwich	Episode: "Trevor"
1999	Law & Order: Special Victims Unit	Deborah Latrell	Episode: "Or Just Look Like One"
1999	Third Watch	Doris Fontaine	Episode: "Hell Is What You Make of It"
1999	Dharma & Greg	Cynthia	Episode: "Looking for the Goodbars"
1999	Nash Bridges	Tara Browning	Episode: "Rip Off"
2000	The Sopranos	Arlene Riley	Episode: "Do Not Resuscitate"
2001	The Invisible Man	Dr. Elizabeth Rendell	2 episodes
2001	The Lone Gunmen	Carol Strode	Episode: "The Lying Game"
2002–2008	The Shield	Sergeant Danielle "Danny" Sofer	Main cast
2002	Taken	Sally Clarke	3 episodes
2005	CSI: Crime Scene Investigation	Kay Marquette / Irene	Episode: "Who Shot Sherlock"
2005	Judging Amy	Connie Barrett	Episode: "You Don't Know Me"
2005	Phantom Below	Lieutenant Claire Trifoli	TV film
2006	Law & Order	Dena Carter	Episode: "Deadlock"
2007	Grey's Anatomy	Cathy Rogerson	Episode: "My Favorite Mistake"
2007	Numb3rs	Naomi Vaughn	Episode: "The Janus List"
2007	Without a Trace	Lindsay Bynum	Episode: "One Wrong Move"
2007	The Bad Son	Ronnie McAdams	TV film
2008	Terminator: The Sarah Connor Chronicles	Agent Greta Simpson	3 episodes
2009	Criminal Minds	Ellen Daniels	Episode: "Pleasure Is My Business"
2009	Natalee Holloway	Carol Standifer	TV film
2010	Ghost Whisperer	Laura Bradley	Episode: "Lethal Combination"
2010	The Closer	Melissa Disken	Episode: "Help Wanted"
2010	Lie to Me	Faye Sheridan	Episode: "Pied Piper"
2010	Law & Order: LA	Defense Attorney	Episode: "Harbor City"
2010	NCIS	Whitney Sharp	2 episodes
2011	Breakout Kings	Paula Berry	Episode: "Off the Beaten Path"
2011–2012	The Mentalist	FBI Agent Susan Darcy	Recurring role
2011	Chuck	Jane	Episode: "Chuck Versus the Business Trip"
2012	Touch	Abigail Kelsey	4 episodes
2012	Leverage	Ellen Casey	Episode: "The Long Goodbye Job"
2012	Drew Peterson: Untouchable	Karen Chojnacki	TV film
2013	Castle	Beth Tanner	Episode: "The Human Factor"
2014	Rake	Judge Dupre	Episode: "A Close Shave"
2014	Guilty at 17	Mrs. Scott	TV film
2015	The Player	Barbara Lee	Episode: "A House Is Not A Home"
2016	Fear the Walking Dead	Melissa Geary	Episode: "We All Fall Down"
2017–2018	Agents of S.H.I.E.L.D.	General Hale	Recurring role
2018	Arrow	Alexa Van Owen	Episode: "Docket No. 11-19-41-73"
2019	SEAL Team	Liddy Breen	Episode: "Never Out of the Fight"
2019	How to Get Away with Murder	DHS Attorney Ford	Episode: "Vivian's Here"
2019	Magnum P.I.	Georgia Preston	Episode: "The Man in the Secret Room"
2020	Dave	Debbie	Episode: "Ally's Toast"
2021	Lucifer	Dr. Alice Porter	Episode: "Resting Devil Face"
2023	9-1-1	Detective Phelps	Episode: "Recovery"
