= Ithaqua (film) =

Canadian horror film

- Directed by: Casey Walker
- Screenplay by: Casey Walker
- Produced by: Casey Walker; Peter Vicaire; Pascal Trottier
- Starring: Luke Hemsworth; Kevin Durand; Michael Pitt; Craig Lauzon; Leenah Robinson
- Production company: Hammer Films
- Release date: August 29, 2026 (FrightFest)
- Running time: 102 minutes
- Country: Canada
- Language: English

Ithaqua is a Canadian horror film directed and co-produced by Casey Walker for Hammer Films, and starring Luke Hemsworth, Kevin Durand, Craig Lauzon, Leenah Robinson, and Michael Pitt.

== Premise ==
Survivors in a remote outpost in 19th century Canada are plagued by an old evil that gives them an insatiable appetite for human flesh.

== Cast ==
- Luke Hemsworth
- Kevin Durand
- Michael Pitt
- Craig Lauzon
- Leenah Robinson

== Production ==
The film is directed and produced by Casey Walker and co-written by Walker with Peter Vicaire and Pascal Trottier. The film is produced by Hammer Films.

The cast includes Luke Hemsworth, Kevin Durand, Michael Pitt, Craig Lauzon and Leenah Robinson.

Principal photography took place in Thunder Bay, Ontario in January 2025 and with production finished, first look images from filming were released in February 2026.

== Distribution ==
The film is slated to premiere in August 2026 at FrightFest, followed by its Canadian premiere at the 2026 Cinéfest Sudbury International Film Festival.

It will be screened in Panorama section of the 59th Sitges Film Festival in October 2026.
