= Chloe Rose =

Canadian-British actress

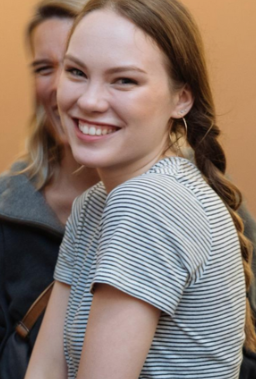
- Rose in 2017
- Born: Toronto, Ontario, Canada
- Citizenship: Canada; United Kingdom
- Occupation: Actress
- Years active: 2011–present

Chloe Rose is a British-Canadian actress. She first rose to prominence when she portrayed Katie Matlin in the long-running teen drama television series Degrassi: The Next Generation, from 2011 to 2013.

Following her time on Degrassi, Rose starred in the web series Teenagers (2014–2017), earning several award nominations for her performance as the lead protagonist, Bree. Rose has also starred in feature films such as Anita Doron's The Lesser Blessed (2012), Bruce McDonald's Hellions (2015), and Adam MacDonald's Pyewacket (2017). After a hiatus, she returned to the screen in a 2024 episode of Murdoch Mysteries.

== Early life ==
Rose was born and raised in Toronto, Ontario. She identifies as half-British and acquired citizenship of the United Kingdom in 2019. Her parents came out as gay after she was born. Rose grew up in the same neighbourhood as award-winning Canadian film director Bruce McDonald, with whom she would later work with on Hellions (2015). As a teenager, she babysat his children. Rose attended high school at the Etobicoke School of the Arts alongside fellow Degrassi star Aislinn Paul.

== Career ==
Rose first attracted attention as an actress for her portrayal of Katie Matlin in the long-running teen drama television series Degrassi: The Next Generation. She was cast in 2010, with no previous acting experience; she left when her character graduated in 2013, after three seasons. Following her departure from Degrassi, Rose went on to play a variety of guest roles in several television series, including Rookie Blue (2012–2014), Lost Girl (2013), Killjoys (2015), and Dark Matter (2015).

In addition to her work in television, Rose has starred in a string of independent films. Her first film role was as Juliet Hope in The Lesser Blessed, directed by Anita Doron, which premiered at the 2012 Toronto International Film Festival. In 2014, she starred alongside Erin Sanders in the made-for-television film Guilty at 17. Later that year, she played a supporting role in the science-fiction film Bang Bang Baby, which premiered at the 2014 Toronto International Film Festival.

In 2015, Rose played the lead role in the Bruce McDonald-directed horror film Hellions (2015), alongside Luke Bilyk and Robert Patrick, which premiered at the 2015 Sundance Film Festival. During the 2015 Toronto International Film Festival, where Hellions also screened, IndieWire named Rose as one of the "9 Up-and-Coming Actors to Watch For". Hellions received mixed reviews from critics. That year, she was also part of the ensemble cast in the film People Hold On, directed by Michael Seater.

In 2016, Rose was featured in several productions, including 5 Films About Technology, a short film by Peter Huang, which screened at the 2016 Sundance Film Festival and 2016 Toronto International Film Festival, the drama film Unless, alongside Catherine Keener, which also premiered at the 2016 Toronto International Film Festival.

In 2017, Rose starred in the short film Clownface opposite her Rookie Blue co-star Matt Gordon; the film was released online through Vimeo, where it was chosen as a staff pick. Also in 2017, Rose returned as Katie Matlin on Degrassi: Next Class, for two episodes, and played a supporting role in the horror-thriller film Pyewacket, alongside Laurie Holden and Nicole Muñoz, which premiered at the 2017 Toronto International Film Festival.

From 2014 to 2017, Rose starred as the central protagonist, Bree, in the web series Teenagers. Rose has received considerable acclaim for her performance in the series, earning award nominations from the International Academy of Web Television, the Los Angeles Web Series Festival, the Indie Series Awards, and the Vancouver Web Series Festival. The third and final season premiered on YouTube on November 5, 2017. For her work in the third season of Teenagers, Rose earned a second nomination from the International Academy of Web Television at the 5th annual IAWTV Awards, but ultimately lost to High Life's Odessa Young. In 2018, she received a second nomination for Best Actress at the Vancouver Web Series Festival.

After a hiatus from acting between the late 2010s and early 2020s, Rose returned to the screen in the 17th season of the television series Murdoch Mysteries as Iona Campbell in the episode titled "A Heavy Event".

== Filmography ==
=== Film ===
Year	Title	Role	Notes
2012	The Lesser Blessed	Juliet Hope	
2014	Bang Bang Baby	Fifi	
2015	Unearthing	Cheyenne Farren	
2015	People Hold On	Marley	
2015	Hellions	Dora Vogel	
2016	5 Films About Technology	Aimee	Short film
2016	Unless	Christine	
2017	Clownface	Laurie	Short film
2017	Pyewacket	Janice	
2018	eHero	Kate Valery	
2019	She Never Died	Sandra	

=== Television ===
Year	Title	Role	Notes
2011–2013	Degrassi	Katlynn 'Katie' Matlin	Main role (seasons 11–13)
2012–2015	Rookie Blue	Izzy Shaw	Episodes: "Coming Home", "Deal with the Devil", "Best Man"
2013	Darknet	Shari	Episode: "Darknet 6"
2013	Cracked	Maddie Kelly	Episode: "The Valley"
2013	Lost Girl	Julia Jenkins	Episode: "Lovers. Apart."
2014	Guilty at 17	Devon Cavanor	Television film
2015	Dark Matter	Mireille	Episodes: "Pilot – Parts 1 & 2"
2015	Killjoys	Constance	Episode: "Vessel"
2017	Degrassi: Next Class	Katlynn 'Katie' Matlin	Episodes: "#Woke", "#ImSleep", "#Obsessed"
2018	Caught	Bride	Episodes: "Old Wounds", "Just Trust Me"
2018	Roomies	Yoga Partner	Television short
2024	Murdoch Mysteries	Iona Campbell	Episode: "A Heavy Event"

=== Web series ===
Year	Title	Role	Notes
2014–2017	Teenagers	Bree	22 episodes

== Accolades ==
Year	Association	Category	Nominated work	Result	Refs
2015	International Academy of Web Television	Best Female Performance – Drama	Teenagers	Nominated	
2015	Los Angeles Web Series Festival	Outstanding Lead Actress in a Drama Series	Teenagers	Nominated	
2016	Indie Series Awards	Best Lead Actress – Drama	Teenagers	Nominated	
2016	Vancouver Web Series Festival	Best Actress	Teenagers	Nominated	
2017	International Academy of Web Television	Best Female Performance – Drama	Teenagers	Nominated	
2018	Vancouver Web Series Festival	Best Actress	Teenagers	Nominated	
2018	WorldFest Houston	Best Actress	eHero	Nominated	
