= Craig Wallace (director) =

Canadian television director

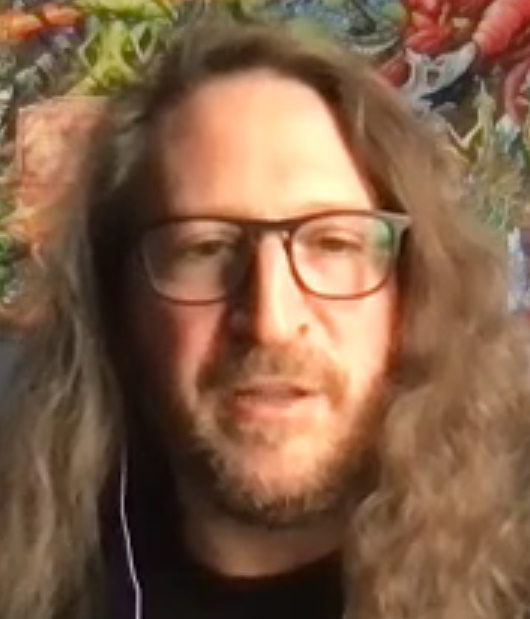
Wallace in 2021

Craig Wallace is a Canadian television director, writer and producer.

== Career ==
Wallace was the co-creator and showrunner of the live action half-hour supernatural-comedy high school series Todd and the Book of Pure Evil.

He directed all eight episodes of Slasher in its first season. He has also directed sketches on the second season of The Beaverton.

He was awarded the 2012 Writers Guild of Canada TV Comedy Award, and was nominated for the same award again in 2013. He was also nominated for Best Direction in a TV Comedy Series at the 2011 Gemini Awards, 2012 Canadian Comedy Awards, and 6th Canadian Screen Awards in 2018. He has directed episodes of Murdoch Mysteries since Season 12.

His theatrical horror film Motherly premiered in 2021.
