= New York Television Festival =

Annual festival

The New York Television Festival (NYTVF) was a yearly festival dedicated to the celebration and promotion of independent small-screen productions, web series, and television.

== Background ==
The festival was founded in 2005, and is held in venues across New York City. Its main event is the Independent Pilot Competition, which showcases independent television pilots to industry executives and producers. HBO, NBC Universal, A&E, and many other networks, have all made regular appearances at the festival, while pilots in the competition have received development deals. In addition to the pilot competition, the festival hosts parties, seminars, and other events to honor television as an institution and as an art form.

The festival was last held in 2018. In 2019, executive Director Terence Gray expressed hope that the festival would resume the following year, but it never returned.

== Reception ==
New York Magazine dubbed the festival "small screen Sundance". In 2017, Tubefilter described the festival's competition slate as "diverse", noting that "44% of all selected projects feature people of color as either creator, writer, or director" and that "71% of the projects feature at least one woman in a core creative role".

== See also ==
- List of television festivals
