= Vancouver Web Series Festival =

- Festival Logo
- Country: Canada
- First award: 2014
- Website: http://www.vancouverwebfest.com

The Vancouver Web Series Festival, also known as the Vancouver Web Fest, is a web series festival based in Vancouver, British Columbia, Canada. It is known as the first ever Canadian festival dedicated solely to entertainment and programming created exclusively for the Internet.

In 2017, IndieWire called the festival "one of the leading destinations for quality web content". Raindance dubbed it one of the "must attend" web series events for creators and fans of online content. The Province described the festival as "the future of broadcast."

== Background ==
The festival was founded in 2013 by Canadian film and television producer, writer and entrepreneur Suzette Laqua, and had its inaugural event May 2 through May 4, 2014. The 2nd annual event was held March 6 through March 8, 2015, at Performance Works on Vancouver’s Granville Island and was covered by various media and press outlets including Playback. The 3rd annual event was held March 18 through 20, 2016, at the same location. The 4th annual festival took place March 17 through 19, 2017.

The fifth annual festival took place at a new location, the Vancouver Convention Centre, from April 19 to 21, 2018. In 2019, the festival went on hiatus due to Laqua's diagnosis with hippocampal sclerosis; Laqua told Playback that she had to step back and take time to focus on her health. A 2020 festival was planned, but has not yet taken place.

== Reception ==
The festival attracts filmmakers and industry executives from around the world and is one of the main events of its kind dedicated to web series. In 2017, IndieWire called the festival "one of the leading destinations for quality web content". Raindance dubbed it one of the "must attend" web series events for creators and fans of online content. The Province described the festival as "the future of broadcast."

== Awards ==
The festival presents screenings of their official selections and hosts an awards ceremony at the end of each festival; award-winners receive silver trophies and certain categories include financial or in kind prizes. Main awards include Best Canadian Series, Best of B.C., Best Foreign Series, and other craft or genre-specific categories such as Best Director, Actor, Actress, and Screenplay.

=== Current categories ===
- Best Overall Series
- Best Canadian Series
- Best of B.C.
- Best Foreign Series
- Best Actor
- Best Actress
- Best Director
- Best Screenplay
- Best Cinematography
- Best Original Score
- Best Sound Design
- Best Special Effects
- Best Drama Series
- Best Dramedy Series
- Best Comedy Series
- Best Animation Series
- Best Documentary Series
- Best Fantasy Series
- Best Horror Series
- Best Reality Series
- Best Science Fiction Series

=== Past winners ===
==== 5th: 2018 ====
- Best of Festival Award: Inconceivable (Canada)
- Best Canadian Series: Teenagers (Canada)
- Best Foreign Series: Scout (Australia)
- Best of B.C.: Girls vs. The City (Vancouver)
- Best International Series: Thesha (South Africa)
- Best Actor: Jason Gendrick, Trouble Creek
- Best Actress: Odessa Young, High Life
- Best Director: Stacey K. Nlack & Shea E. Butler, Trouble Creek
- Best Screenplay: Fluffy Marky (Canada)
- Best Cinematography: Filth City (Canada)
- Best Original Score: Spiral (Canada)
- Best Sound Design: The Drive (Canada)
- Best Special Effects: The Last 7 (Malaysia)
- Best Visual Effects: Strowlers (USA)
- Best Drama Series: Nasty Habits (USA)
- Best Comedy Series: The Dangers of Online Dating (Canada)
- Best Dramedy Series: Adulthood / L'Âge adulte (Canada)
- Best Animation Series: This is Desmondo Ray! (Australia)
- Best Documentary Series: KYNNSTLAH: A Series of Artist Portraits (Germany/USA)
- Best Family Series: Scout & The Gumboot Kids (Canada)
- Best Fantasy Series: The Dreamcatcher (Australia)
- Best Horror Series: Burkland (Belgium)
- Best Pilot (under 30 minutes): The Last 7 (Malaysia)
- Best Pilot (over 30 minutes): The Gamers: The Shadow Menace (USA)
- Best Reality Series: House Call with Dr. Yvette Lu (Canada)
- Best Science Fiction Series: Restoration (Australia)
- Best Virtual Reality Project: The Great (Mexico)

==== 4th: 2017 ====
- Best Overall Series: The Wizards of Aus (Australia)
- Best Canadian Series: That's My DJ (Canada)
- Best Foreign Series: Scout (Australia)
- Best of B.C.: This Is That (Vancouver)
- Best Actor: Paul Witton, Dropping the Soap
- Best Actress: Rosie Lourde, Starting From Now
- Best Director: D. W. Waterson, That's My DJ
- Best Screenplay: This Is That (Vancouver)
- Best Cinematography: Thornbrook (USA)
- Best Editing: InVancity (Vancouver)
- Best Original Score: The Wizards of Aus (Australia)
- Best Sound Design: Telegraph Cove (Canada)
- Best Special Effects: Discocalypse (Germany)
- Best Visual Effects: The Wizards of Aus (Australia)
- Best Drama Series: Nasty Habits (USA)
- Best Comedy Series: Sublets (USA)
- Best Action/Adventure Series: Surf Therapy (France)
- Best Animation Series: The Adventure of a Broken Heart (Australia)
- Best Documentary Series: No Strings Attached (Norway)
- Best Family Series: Fluffy Marky (Canada)
- Best Fantasy Series: The Wizards of Aus (Australia)
- Best Horror Series: Or So the Story Goes... (USA)
- Best Musical Series: Roo-ining Christmas (USA)
- Best Mystery Series: Petrol (Canada)
- Best Reality Series: Late Bloomer (USA)
- Best Science Fiction Series: Conversations from the Afterlife (USA)
- Best Thriller Series: Kill Skills (France)
- Carter Mason Award of Excellence: Ed Brando

==== 3rd: 2016 ====
- Best Overall Series: Riftworld Chronicles (Canada)
- Best Canadian Series: The Banks (French: Les Berges) (Canada)
- Best Foreign Series: Persuasive (France)
- Best Actor: Jarod Joseph, Coded
- Best Actress: Sarah Jane Seymour, Rapt
- Best Director: Stuart Gillies, The Drive
- Best Screenplay: Teenagers (Canada)
- Best Cinematography: Jens Bambauer, Number of Silence (Germany)
- Best Original Score: Arthur (Switzerland)
- Best Sound Design: Airlock (Australia)
- Best Special Effects: Phoenix Run (USA)
- Best Drama Series: The Banks (French: Les Berges) (Canada)
- Best Comedy Series: Couch Surfing U.S.A. (USA)
- Best Action/Adventure Series: Sudden Master (Canada)
- Best Animation Series: Uberdude (Canada)
- Best Documentary Series: Stories Of Youth: A Portrait Of A Generation (Norway)
- Best Family Series: Ty The Pie Guy (USA)
- Best Fantasy Series: Walking In Circles (USA)
- Best Horror Series: Il Sonnambulo (USA)
- Best Mystery/Thriller Series: The Rolling Soldier (USA)
- Best Reality Series: Listen Up: Making it at Berklee College of Music (USA)
- Best Science Fiction Series: Riftworld Chronicles (Canada)
- Dailymotion Choice Award: Manic Pixie Dream Wife (USA)

==== 2nd: 2015 ====
- Best Overall Series: Guidestones: Sunflower Noir (Canada)
- Best Canadian Series: Whatever, Linda (Canada)
- Best Foreign Series: Dynamo (USA)
- Best Actor: Joe Sofranko, Complete Works
- Best Actress: Hope Lauren, Nasty Habits
- Best Director: Peter DeLuise, PARKED
- Best Screenplay: Discrepance (France)
- Best Cinematography: Guidestones: Sunflower Noir (Canada)
- Best Original Score: Whatever, Linda (Canada)
- Best Special Effects: Disrien (Canada)
- Best Drama Series: Whatever, Linda (Canada)
- Best Comedy Series: LARPs (Canada)
- Best Action/Adventure Series: Caper (USA)
- Best Animation Series: Food Flix (Canada)
- Best Documentary Series: Foodists (Canada)
- Best Family Series: Ruby Sky P.I. (Canada)
- Best Fantasy Series: Les Jaunes (Canada)
- Best Horror Series: Stricken (Canada)
- Best Mystery Series: L.A. Macabre (USA)
- Best Reality Series: Dress Up! with George B. Style (USA)
- Best Science Fiction Series: Still (USA)
- Best Thriller Series: Asset (Canada)

==== 1st: 2014 ====
- Best Overall Series: Libres (Spain)
- Best Canadian Series: The True Heroines (Canada)
- Best Foreign Series: Sin Via Propia (UK)
- Best Actor: Gil Reiker, Libres
- Best Actress: Katie Boland, Long Story, Short
- Best Drama Series: Cuckoo (Ireland)
- Best Comedy Series: inSAYSHABLE (Canada)
- Best Action/Adventure Series: Wastelander Panda (Australia)
- Best Animation Series: Under the Hud (Canada)
- Best Documentary Series: Vancouver Cycle Chic (Canada)
- Best Fantasy/Science Fiction Series: Deja Vu (Colombia)
- Best Horror Series: The Syndicate (UK)
- Best Musical Series: Destroy the Alpha Gammas (USA)
- Best Mystery/Thriller Series: Ruby Sky P.I. (Canada)
- Best Reality Series: Tailgate32 (USA)
- People's Choice: Kid's Town (Canada)

== See also ==
- Web television
- List of Web television series
- Web series
