= 39th Daytime Creative Arts Emmy Awards =

39th Daytime Creative Emmy Awards
- Awarded for: Outstanding achievement in all fields of daytime television
- Date: June 17, 2012
- Location: Westin Bonaventure (Los Angeles)
- Presented by: National Academy of Television Arts and Sciences
- Preshow hosts: A.J. Hammer; Nischelle Turner

Highlights
- Most wins: General Hospital (5)
- Most nominations: General Hospital (23)
- Website: emmyonline.org

The 39th Annual Creative Arts Emmy Awards presented by the National Academy of Television Arts and Sciences (NATAS), "recognizes outstanding achievement in all fields of daytime television production and are presented to individuals and programs broadcast from 2:00 a.m.—6:00 p.m. during the 2011 calendar year".

The 39th Annual Creative Arts Emmy Awards ceremony was held at the Westin Bonaventure in Los Angeles on June 17, 2012. General Hospital won the most awards, with a total of five wins including Outstanding Drama Series and Outstanding Drama Series Directing Team and other Creative Arts Emmy Awards. The soap opera also had the most awards with a total of 23 (including Creative Arts Emmy Awards). Anthony Geary won its seventh win in the Outstanding Lead Actor in a Drama Series category. Live! with Regis and Kelly won in the Outstanding Talk Show Entertainment category for its last season. June Foray won for Outstanding Performer in an Animated Program at age 94, becoming the oldest competitive winner in Emmy history. The Lifetime Achievement Award was presented to television producer Bill Geddie.

== Winners and nominees ==
In the lists below, the winner of the category is in bold.

Category	Winners and nominees
Outstanding Casting For An Animated Series Or Special	**Meredith Layne and Sarah Noonan (Kung Fu Panda: Legends of Awesomeness)**; Brian Mathias (Jake and the Never Land Pirates); David Doan, Maria Estrada, Michelle Levitt and Leslie Zaslower (Bubble Guppies)
Outstanding Culinary Program	**Bobby Flay's Barbecue Addiction**; Giada at Home; Guy's Big Bite; Sandwich King
Outstanding Directing in an Animated Program	Gabe Swarr, Jim Schumann, Mike Mullen, Juan Meza-Leon and Peter Hastings (Kung Fu Panda: Legends of Awesomeness); **David Knott, Shaun Cashman, Christo Stamboliev, Steve Loter and Lisa Schaffer (The Penguins of Madagascar)**; Alan Smart, Tom Yasumi, Andrew Overtoom, Paul Tibbitt, Casey Alexander, Zeus Cervas, Aaron Springer, Nate Cash, Luke Brookshier, Casey Alexander, Zeus Cervas, Sean Charmatz, Vincent Waller and Andrea Romano (SpongeBob SquarePants); David Hartman, Vinton Heuck, Shaunt Nigoghossian, Todd Waterman, Jamie Simone, Hiroyuki Hayashi, Kazuma Shimizu, Kazushi Nagase, Keisuke Ide and Akio Kazumi (Transformers Prime)
Outstanding Writing in Animation	Doug Langdale, Kevin Seccia, Peter Hastings, Cheryl Holliday and Scott Kreamer (Kung Fu Panda: Legends of Awesomeness); Bill Motz, Bob Roth and Brandon Sawyer (The Penguins of Madagascar); Adam Peltzman, Jeff Borkin, Kerri Grant, Scott Gray, Rodney Stringfellow and Janice Burgess (The Backyardigans); Ken Scarborough, Raye Lankford, Joe Fallon, Ron Holsey and Peter K. Hirsch (Martha Speaks); **Tom Martin, Sergio Cilli, Jack Ferraiolo, Carla Filisha, Scott Ganz, Rick Groel, John N. Huss, Eric Ledgin, Ryan Raddatz and Andrew Samson (WordGirl)**
Outstanding Sound Editing - Animation	**Joe Pizzulo, Paulette Lifton, James Lifton, Benjamin Wynn, Jeremy Zuckerman, Rob McIntryre, Anna Adams, Jason Stiff, Molly Minus, Matt Hall, Andrew Ing, Roberto Dominguez Alegria, Aran Tanchum, Chris Gresham and Lawrence Reyes (Kung Fu Panda: Legends of Awesomeness)**; Paulette Lifton, James Lifton, Adam Berry, Dominick Certo, Michael Petak, D.J. Lynch, Oliver Pearce, Matt Hall, Ian Nyeste, Aran Tanchum, Chris Gresham and Lawrence Reyes (The Penguins of Madagascar); Paulette Lifton, James Lifton, Kimberlee Vanek, Nick Carr, MIshelle Fordham, D.J. Lynch, Jeffrey Hutchins, Aran Tanchum, Matt Hall, Chris Gresham and Todd Brodie (SpongeBob SquarePants); Jonny Ludgate, Jeff Davis and Gordon Sproule (Hot Wheels Battle Force 5); Robbi Smith, Robert Poole II and Roy Braverman (Transformers Prime)
Outstanding Sound Mixing - Animation	**Justin Brinsfield, Matt Corey and Thomas J. Maydeck (Kung Fu Panda: Legends of Awesomeness)**; Dean Giammarco and Ewan Deane (Hot Wheels Battle Force 5); Mark Mercado and Thomas J Maydeck (Monster High); Ray Leonard and Michael Beiriger (Transformers Prime)
Outstanding Individual in Animation	**Joel Fajnor (Kung Fu Panda: Legends of Awesomeness)**; **Ernie Gilbert (T.U.F.F. Puppy)**; **Christophe Vacher (Transformers Prime)**
Outstanding Music Direction and Composition	Adam Berry (The Penguins of Madagascar); Guy Moon (T.U.F.F. Puppy); **Jeffrey Lesser, Larry Hochman and Josh Selig (Wonder Pets!)**; Nick Nolan (Curious George)
Outstanding Original Song - Children's and Animation	Dora the Explorer (Nickelodeon); "Todos Juntos Finale Song" - George Noriega, Musical Composer; Joel Someillan, Musical Composer; My Little Pony: Friendship Is Magic (The Hub); "Becoming Popular (The Pony Everypony Should Know)" - Daniel Ingram, composer; Meghan McCarthy, lyricist; "Find a Pet Song" - Daniel Ingram, composer; Charlotte Fullerton, lyricist; **The Penguins of Madagascar (Nickelodeon)**; **"In the Happy Little Land of Hoboken Surprise"** Adam Berry, composer; Brandon Sawyer, lyricist; "Off the Clock" - Adam Berry, composer; John Behnke, lyricist; Sesame Street (PBS); "Don't Give Up" - Bill Sherman, composer; Joey Mazzarino, lyricist
Outstanding Lifestyle Program	**Cars.TV**; Chop Cut Rebuild; Martha; My Generation; Rough Cut
AOL Best Viral Video	Can't Hug Every Cat; Epic Meal Time; CollegeHumor's Jake and Amir; **Kids React**
Outstanding Commercial	**MiO / The Seven**; Just Dance 3 / Jersey Shore
New Approaches - Daytime Children's	**Design Squad**; Cyberchase; Fizzy's Lunch Lab; Noah Comprende
Outstanding Pre-School Children's Series	**Sesame Street**; 3rd & Bird; Super Why!; Wonder Pets!; Yo Gabba Gabba!
Outstanding Promotional Announcement - Episodic	**General Hospital**; "Brenda Wedding" & "Kidnapping"; Disney XD; I'm In the Band Flipbook; Pair of Kings Flipbook; Dr. Phil; "The Anthonys" Campaign; Jeopardy!; The IBM Challenge; Today; The Royal Wedding
Outstanding Promotional Announcement - Institutional	**The Ellen DeGeneres Show**; **Promises**; You Never Know; PBS Be More; Marker Moments; PBS KIDS; “What If?”
Outstanding Special Class Animated Program	**Transformers: Prime**; Fanboy & Chum Chum
Outstanding Special Class Series	**Super Soul Sunday**; Ask This Old House; Made; Pop Up Video; Quiet Campus; Sanjay Gupta MD
Outstanding Special Class Special	**Style Exposed**; **Baring it All**; Sperm Donor; 30 Years From Here; The "Joni" Show; Holocaust: Horror to Hope; President Obama’s 2011 Race To The Top Commencement Challenge; Thanksgiving Live!
Outstanding Performer in an Animated Program	**June Foray as Mrs. Cauldron**; The Garfield Show: Which Witch; James Hong as Mr. Ping; Kung Fu Panda: Legends of Awesomeness; Jeff Bennett as Kowalski; The Penguins of Madagascar; Rodger Bumpass as Squidward; SpongeBob SquarePants
Outstanding Achievement in Art Direction/ Set Decoration/Scenic Design for a Drama Series	**The Bold and the Beautiful**; All My Children; Days of Our Lives; General Hospital
Outstanding Achievement for a Casting Director For A Drama Series	**Mark Teschner**; General Hospital; Marnie Saitta; Days of Our Lives; Camille St. Cyr; The Young and the Restless
Outstanding Achievement in Costume Design For A Drama Series	**Mary Iannelli**; General Hospital; David Zyla; All My Children; Susan Gammie; Sally Lesser; David Brooks; One Life to Live
Outstanding Drama Series Directing Team	**General Hospital**; The Bold and the Beautiful; One Life to Live; The Young and the Restless
Outstanding Drama Series Writing Team	**Days of Our Lives**; All My Children; General Hospital; The Young and the Restless
Outstanding Achievement in Hairstyling For A Drama Series	**Michele Arvizo, Key Hairstylist**; **Audrey Soto, Hairstylist**; **Romaine Markus-Myers, Hairstylist**; **Adriana Lucio, Hairstylist**; The Bold and the Beautiful^{1}; **George Guzman, Hairstylist**; **Shannon Bradberry, Hairstylist**; **Mary Kate Welsh, Hairstylist**; **Rachel Ross Bunch, Hairstylist**; **Adriana Lucio, Hairstylist**; **Regina Rodriguez, Hairstylist**; **Rachel Mason Bonner, Hairstylist**; The Young and the Restless^{1}; Margie Puga, Hairstylist; Matthew Holman, Hairstylist; Patrick Kilian, Hairstylist; Garry Allyn, Hairstylist; Katharine O'Neill, Hairstylist; Jen Singleton, Hairstylist; Days of Our Lives; Anzhela Adzhiyan, Hairstylist; Jennifer Petrovich, Hairstylist; Lauran Poole, Hairstylist; General Hospital
Outstanding Achievement in Lighting Direction For A Drama Series	**Bob Bessoir, Lighting Director**; **Scott Devitte, Lighting Director**; One Life to Live; Patrick Cunniff, Lighting Director; Phil Callan, Lighting Director; The Bold and the Beautiful; Ted Polmanski, Lighting Director; Mark Levin, Lighting Designer; Days of Our Lives; Ray Thompson, Lighting Director; Bill Roberts, Lighting Director; The Young and the Restless
Outstanding Achievement in Live & Direct To Tape Sound Mixing For A Drama Series	**Christopher Banninger, Production Mixer**; **RT Smith, Post-Production Mixer**; **Anthony Inglese, Boom Operator**; **Stu Rudolph, Boom Operator**; **Andy Morales, Boom Operator**; All My Children^{2}; Tommy Persson, Production Mixer; Dino Johnson, Post-Production Mixer; Mark Beckley, Boom Operator; Luis Godinez Sr., Boom Operator; Mark Mooney, Boom Operator; Denise Palm Stones, Boom Operator; The Young and the Restless^{2}; Aaron Lepley, Production Mixer; George Forbes, Post-Production Mixer; Brian Connell, Re-Recording Mixer; Jerry Martz, Sound Effects Mixer; Danny Lecuna, Sound Effects Mixer; Ricky Alvarez, Boom Operator; Dave Golba, Boom Operator; Stan Sweeney, Boom Operator; Brian Cuneen, Boom Operator; The Bold and the Beautiful; William DeBlock, Production Mixer; Paul S. Glass, Pre-Production Mixer; Daniel Krausz, Pre-Production Mixer; David Marino, Post-Production Mixer; Charles Eisen, Boom Operator; Wiliam Mozer, Boom Operator; Deborah D'Anduono, Boom Operator; Larry Strack, Boom Operator; Tom Shepard, Boom Operator; Joe Puleo, Boom Operator; Barrin Bonet, Boom Operator; One Life to Live
Outstanding Achievement in Makeup For A Drama Series	**Gail J. Hopkins, Head Makeup Artist**; **Nina Wells, Makeup Artist**; **Joleen Rizzo, Makeup Artist**; **Glen Alen Gutierrez, Makeup Artist**; **Deidre Decker, Makeup Artist**; Days of Our Lives; Donna Messina, Head Makeup Artist; Dara Jaramillo, Makeup Artist; Bobbie Roberts, Makeup Artist; Melinda Osgood, Makeup Artist; Angela Ackley, Makeup Artist; Tamara Papirian, Makeup Artist; General Hospital; Renate Long, Head Makeup Artist; Julia Davis, Makeup Artist; James Demarco, Makeup Artist; One Life to Live; Patti Denney, Key Makeup Artist; Kathy Jones, Makeup Artist; Robert Bolger, Makeup Artist; Ralph Wilcox, Makeup Artist; Marlene Mason, Makeup Artist; The Young and the Restless
Outstanding Achievement in Multiple Camera Editing For A Drama Series	**Anthony Pascarelli, Editor**; **Marika Kushel, Editor**; All My Children; Jonathan Smilowitz, Editor; Sean-Michael Connor, Editor; Zoe Edgerton, Editor; Brian Bagwell, Editor; The Bold and the Beautiful; Tina Keller, Editor; Michael Fiamingo, Editor; Joseph Lumar, Editor; Lugh Powers, Lead Editor; Days of Our Lives; Tracy Casper Lang, Editor; Teresa Cicala, Editor; Michael Sweeney, Editor; Barry Gingold, Editor; Vince Catania, Editor; Stephen Cali, Editor; Larry Farina, Editor; One Life to Live; Marc Beruti, Editor; Ralph Gertel, Editor; Steve Pierron, Editor; Jim Friesen, Editor; The Young and the Restless
Outstanding Achievement in Music Direction And Composition For A Drama Series	**Mike Dobson, Music Supervisor**; **Bryan Harrison, Music Supervisor**; **Jack Allocco, Composer**; **David Kurtz, Composer**; The Young and the Restless; Terry Walker, Music Director; Jerry Pilato, Music Supervisor; Gary Kuo, Composer; Donn Wilkerson, Composer; Jim Klein, Composer; Pat O'Donnell, Composer; Martin Davich, Composer; All My Children; Lothar Struff, Music Supervisor; Bradley P. Bell, Composer; Jack Allocco, Composer; David Kurtz, Composer; The Bold and the Beautiful; Paul S. Glass, Supervising Music Director, Composer; Daniel Krausz, Music Director; Kurt Biederwolf, Composer; David Nichtern, Composer; Dominic Messenger, Composer; Lee Holdridge, Composer; Kevin Bents, Composer; Chris Child, Composer; Filip Mitrovic, Composer; Bobby Summerfield, Composer; David Marino, Composer; One Life to Live
Outstanding Original Song for a Drama Series	**Dust**; **Robert Howard Hartry, Composer & Lyricist**; **Benjamin West, Composer & Lyricist**; General Hospital; One Life; Paul S. Glass, Composer & Lyricist; One Life to Live; Our Time Will Come; (I Need To) Find My Way Back Home; Jack Allocco, Composer & Lyricist; David Kurtz, Composer & Lyricist; The Young and the Restless
Outstanding Achievement in Technical Direction/Electronic Camera/Video Control For A Drama Series	**Averill Perry, Technical Director**; **Kevin Carr, Technical Director**; **DJ Diomedes, Camera Operator**; **Dale Carlson, Camera Operator**; **Craig Camou, Camera Operator**; **Dean Cosenella, Camera Operator**; **Antonio Simone, Video Control**; **Charles Barrett, Video Control**; General Hospital; Chuck Abate, Technical Director; Barbara Langdon, Camera Operator; John Boyd, Camera Operator; Lew Friant, Camera Operator; David Warner, Camera Operator; Nichel Montgomery, Video Control; All My Children; John C. O'Neill, Technical Director; Mike Caruso, Technical Director; Barbara J. Langdon, Electronic Camera; John D. Sizemore, Electronic Camera; Michael Macartea, Camera Operator; Hugo Morelli, Camera Operator; Bill Scott, Camera Operator; Alexis Dellar Hanson, Senior Video Control; Days of Our Lives; Tracy Lawrence, Technical Director; John Bromberek, Camera Operator; Luis Godinez Jr., Camera Operator; Kai Kim, Camera Operator; Scha Jani, Video Control; Robert Bosio, Video Control; The Young and the Restless
Outstanding Achievement in Art Direction/Set Decoration/Scenic Design	**The Nate Berkus Show**; The Ellen DeGeneres Show; The Fresh Beat Band; Sesame Street
Outstanding Achievement in Costume Design/Styling	**The Fresh Beat Band**; The Ellen DeGeneres Show; R. L. Stine's The Haunting Hour: The Series; Sesame Street; Yo Gabba Gabba!
Outstanding Directing In An Animated Program	**The Penguins of Madagascar**; Kung Fu Panda: Legends of Awesomeness; SpongeBob SquarePants; Transformers: Prime
Outstanding Directing In A Children's Series	**Sesame Street**; Design Squad; The Electric Company; R. L. Stine's The Haunting Hour: The Series
Outstanding Directing in a Lifestyle/Culinary Program	**America's Test Kitchen**; Cook's Country; Giada at Home; Mexico One Plate at a Time with Rick Bayless; This New House
Outstanding Directing In A Talk Show/Morning Program	**Today**; Anderson Live; The Ellen DeGeneres Show; The Oprah Winfrey Show; The View
Outstanding Achievement in Hairstyling	**The Fresh Beat Band**; Rachael Ray; The Talk; The Wendy Williams Show
Outstanding Individual Achievement in Animation	**Joel Fajnor**^{3}; Art Director; Kung Fu Panda: Legends of Awesomeness; **Ernie Gilbert**^{3}; Character Designer; T.U.F.F. Puppy; **Christophe Vacher**^{3}; Supervising Color Designer; Transformers: Prime
Outstanding Achievement in Lighting Direction	**The Ellen DeGeneres Show**; The Oprah Winfrey Show; Rachael Ray; Sesame Street; The View
Outstanding Achievement in Live & Direct To Tape Sound Mixing	**The Oprah Winfrey Show**; The Ellen DeGeneres Show; Today; The View
Outstanding Achievement in Makeup	**Green Screen Adventures**^{4}; **Semi-Homemade Cooking with Sandra Lee**^{4}; R. L. Stine's The Haunting Hour: The Series; The Talk; The View
Outstanding Achievement in Main Title and Graphic Design	**Big Morning Buzz Live**; Dr. Phil; The Fresh Beat Band; The "Joni" Show; Holocaust: Horror to Hope; Superbook; Today
Outstanding Achievement in Multiple Camera Editing	**Sesame Street**; Dr. Phil; The Ellen DeGeneres Show; Giada at Home; The Oprah Winfrey Show
Outstanding Achievement in Music Direction And Composition	**Wonder Pets**; Curious George; The Penguins of Madagascar; T.U.F.F. Puppy
Outstanding Original Song – Children’s and Animation	'**"In the Happy Little Land of Hoboken Surprise"**; "Off the Clock"; The Penguins of Madagascar; "Todos Juntos Finale Song"; Dora the Explorer; "Becoming Popular (The Pony Every Pony Should Know)"; "May the Best Pet Win"; My Little Pony: Friendship Is Magic; "Don't Give Up"; Sesame Street
Outstanding Original Song	**"(Won't You) Join Our Parade"**; "Jolly Dream Pirates"; 85th Annual Macy's Thanksgiving Day Parade
Outstanding Single Camera Editing	**The Electric Company**; Biz Kid$; R. L. Stine's The Haunting Hour: The Series; Surf's Up For Dogs: The Making of the World's Longest and Heaviest Float
Outstanding Achievement in Single Camera Photography (Film or Electronic)	**Equitrekking**; The Electric Company; Giada at Home; R. L. Stine's The Haunting Hour: The Series; Travelscope
Outstanding Special Class Directing	**85th Annual Macy's Thanksgiving Day Parade**; Disney Parks Christmas Day Parade; Sesame Street; Todos juntos contra el hambre (All together against hunger); Travelscope
Outstanding Special Class Writing	**The Ellen DeGeneres Show**; 85th Annual Macy's Thanksgiving Day Parade; Pop Up Video; Sesame Street; Todos juntos contra el hambre (All together against hunger)
Outstanding Technical Direction/Electronic Camera/Video Control	**Sesame Street**; Disney Parks Christmas Day Parade; The Ellen DeGeneres Show; The View
Outstanding Writing In Animation	**WordGirl**; The Backyardigans; Kung Fu Panda: Legends of Awesomeness; Martha Speaks; The Penguins of Madagascar
Outstanding Writing In A Children's Series	**Sesame Street**; 3rd & Bird; The Electric Company; Wild Kratts; Wonder Pets
Outstanding Stunt Coordination	Terry James, Stunt Coordinator; Days of Our Lives; Tim Davison, Stunt Coordinator; General Hospital
Outstanding Special Class Short Format Daytime	**The Time I...Got 322 Pairs of Shoes for my Birthday**; The Bay; Disney A Poem Is...; Nickelodeon's All Together Now Anti Bullying Campaign; Dora the Explorer Interstitial; The Time I...(Dyslexia)

Notes

1. The Bold and the Beautiful & The Young and the Restless tied.
2. All My Children & The Young and the Restless tied.
3. All 3 tied.
4. Green Screen Adventures & Semi-Homemade Cooking with Sandra Lee tied.
