= 40th Daytime Creative Arts Emmy Awards =

- Awarded for: Outstanding achievement in all fields of daytime television
- Date: June 14, 2013
- Location: Los Angeles, California, U.S.
- Presented by: National Academy of Television Arts and Sciences
- Hosted by: Teresa Ganzel; Bob Bergen

Highlights
- Most awards: The Bold and the Beautiful
- Most nominations: The Young and the Restless
- Website: emmyonline.org

The 40th Daytime Creative Arts Emmy Awards, presented by the National Academy of Television Arts and Sciences (NATAS), "recognizes outstanding achievement in all fields of daytime television production and are presented to individuals and programs broadcast from 2:00 a.m. to 6:00 p.m. during the 2012 calendar year". The ceremony was held at the Westin Bonaventure in Los Angeles on June 14, 2013.

The 40th Daytime Creative Arts Emmy Awards was hosted by Teresa Ganzel, Actress, Voice-over Actress and Comedian of The Tonight Show with Johnny Carson fame and Voice-over Actor, Bob Bergen, the voice of "Porky Pig" and others. They were joined by an illustrious group of presenters such as Susan Flannery and John McCook of The Bold and the Beautiful; Melissa Claire Egan and Ignacio Serricchio of The Young and the Restless; Arianne Zucker, James Reynolds and James Scott of Days of Our Lives; Teresa Castillo and Marc Anthony Samuel of General Hospital; Robert Scott Wilson and Denyse Tontz of All My Children; Corbin Bleu of One Life to Live; David Rudman of Sesame Street Workshop; Yvette Gonzalez-Nacer, Tara Perry and Thomas Hobson of Fresh Beat Band; and Christina Ferrare and Mark Steines of The Home and Family Show. In addition, there were several special presenters such as Geri Jewell of The Facts of Life, Mary Elizabeth McDonough of The Waltons, Leslie Miller of Prospect Park's version of One Life to Live, and All My Children, and Tippi Hedren, the iconic actress from Alfred Hitchcock's The Birds.

The Bold and the Beautiful won the most awards, with four trophies including for Outstanding Drama Series Directing Team and five other Creative Arts Emmy Awards out of their 11 nominations.

== Winners and nominees ==
In the lists below, the winner of the category is in bold.

Category	Winners and nominees
Outstanding Animated Program	**Kung Fu Panda: Legends of Awesomeness**; The Penguins of Madagascar; Robot and Monster; Teenage Mutant Ninja Turtles; WordGirl
Outstanding Culinary Program	**The Best Thing I Ever Made** / **Trisha's Southern Kitchen** (tie); Bobby Flay's Barbecue Addiction; Giada at Home; Recipe Rehab
Outstanding Travel Program	Born to Explore with Richard Wiese; Equitrekking; **Jack Hanna's Into the Wild**; Over Hawaii
Outstanding Performer in an Animated Program	Curtis Armstrong as Dan on Dan Vs.; Jim Cummings as Hondo Ohnaka on Star Wars: The Clone Wars; **David Tennant as Huyang on Star Wars: The Clone Wars**; Lee Tockar as Pronto on Slugterra; Jerry Trainor as Dudley Puppy on T.U.F.F. Puppy; Sam Witwer as Darth Maul on Star Wars: The Clone Wars
Outstanding Performer in a Children's Series	**Kevin Clash as Elmo on Sesame Street**; Jeff Corwin - Host on Ocean Mysteries with Jeff Corwin; Joey Mazzarino as Papa Bear, Murray Monster, Blogg, and AM Carson on Sesame Street; David Rudman as Cookie Monster and Two-Headed Monster on Sesame Street
Outstanding Directing in an Animated Program	**Dan Vs.**; Kung Fu Panda: Legends of Awesomeness; The Legend of Korra; The Penguins of Madagascar
Outstanding Lifestyle/Travel Host	**Leeza Gibbons in My Generation**; Paige Davis in Home Made Simple; Jack Hanna in Jack Hanna's Into the Wild; Suzanne Somers in The Suzanne Show
Outstanding Set Decoration for a Drama Series	**The Young and the Restless**; Days of Our Lives; General Hospital
Outstanding Casting for a Drama Series	**The Young and the Restless**; Days of Our Lives; General Hospital
Outstanding Costume Design for a Drama Series	**The Bold and the Beautiful**; Days of Our Lives; General Hospital; The Young and the Restless
Outstanding Hairstyling for a Drama Series	**The Bold and the Beautiful**; Days of Our Lives; The Young and the Restless
Outstanding Lighting Direction for a Drama Series	**The Bold and the Beautiful**; **The Young and the Restless**; Days of Our Lives; General Hospital
Outstanding Sound Mixing for a Drama Series	**Days of Our Lives**; General Hospital
Outstanding Make-Up for a Drama Series	**The Young and the Restless**; Days of Our Lives; General Hospital
Outstanding Music Direction for a Drama Series	**The Bold and the Beautiful**; General Hospital; The Young and the Restless
Outstanding Original Song for a Drama Series	**"Only Love Goes on Forever"** from The Young and the Restless; "Just Like That" from General Hospital
Outstanding Set Design	**The Talk**; The Ellen DeGeneres Show; Live! with Kelly and Michael; R.L. Stine's The Haunting Hour; Sesame Street
Outstanding Costume Design	**R.L. Stine's The Haunting Hour**; The Ellen DeGeneres Show; The Fresh Beat Band; Sesame Street
Outstanding Casting for an Animated Series or Special	**Shannon Reed, Sarah Noonan, and Gene Vassilaros** (The Legend of Korra); Meredith Layne, Sarah Noonan, and Gene Vassilaros (Teenage Mutant Ninja Turtles)
Outstanding Individual in Animation	**Joel Fajnor (Kung Fu Panda: Legends of Awesomeness: Kung Fu Day Care)**; **Bill Dely (Kung Fu Panda: Legends of Awesomeness: Kung Shoes)**; **Jason Park (Transformers: Prime: Orion Pax - Part 3)**; **Arato Kato (Transformers: Prime: Hard Knocks)**; **Kirk Van Wormer (Transformers: Prime: Nemesis Prime)**; **Robert Kline (Minnie's Bow-Toons: Piano and Shakers)**
Outstanding Live & Direct To Tape Sound Mixing	The Chew ABC; Angela Degatano, Dave Marino, Post-Production Mixers Brian Pannier, Ethan Orlovitz, Bill Mozer, Production Mixers Billy Baggett, Sound Effects/Music Mixer: **Disney Parks Christmas Day Parade ABC**; Don Worsham, Pablo Munguia, Production Mixers Jamie Ledner, Post-Production Mixer Brian Riordan, Music Mixer: The Dr. Oz Show SYNDICATED; Bill Taylor, Glenn Arber, Production Mixers: Dr. Phil SYNDICATED; Pat Lucatorto, Audio Mixer: The Ellen DeGeneres Show SYNDICATED; Terry Fountain, Production Mixer Dirk Sciarrotta, Sound Effects Mixer: Good Morning America ABC; Paul Glaser, Production Mixer Jeremy Tanner, Pre-Production Mixer: Steve Harvey SYNDICATED; Jim Slanger, James Ostrom, Production Mixers: The View ABC; Peter Hefter, Chuck Eisen, Rob Gigliuto, Michael Glazier, Production Mixers Joe Hipp, R.J. Osterhoudt, Greg Thompson, Music Mixers
Outstanding Multiple Camera Editing	**Todd James, Tim Carter, Jesse Averna, and John Tierney** (Sesame Street); Rand Morrison, David Bhagat, Remington Korper, David Small, Lauren Barnello, Carol Ross, Ed Givnish, Joseph Frandino, David Spungen, George Pozderec, Seth Fox, and Jiro Akiba (CBS News Sunday Morning); Williams Morris, Ryan Polito, Sharon Everitt, Patrick Franks, and Matt Silfen (Disney Parks Christmas Day Parade)
Outstanding Single Camera Editing	**Alex Carrillo and Jim Golingo** (Biz Kid$); Ezra Gold, Ryan Klabunde, and Steve Flynn (SciGirls); Charles Robichaud and Lisa Robison (R.L. Stine's The Haunting Hour)
Outstanding Single Camera Photography (Film or Electronic)	**John Barnhardt** (Born to Explore with Richard Wiese); **Greg Barna** (Equitrekking); Jon Speyers (Joseph Rosendo's Travelscope); Michael Balfry (R.L. Stine's The Haunting Hour); Joseph Dorsey and John DeMaio (Travel Thru History)
Outstanding Sound Editing - Animation	**Jonny Ludgate, Jeff Davis, and Gordon Sproule** (Slugterra); Jeff Shiffman, Otis Van Osten, Tony Ostyn, Gerry Gonzalez, Matt Hall, and Roger Pallan (Ben 10: Omniverse); Joe Pizzulo, Gary Falcone, Jeremy Zuckerman, Benjamin Wynn, Rob McIntyre, Anna Adams, Marc Schmidt, Andrew Ing, Jessey Drake, Roberto Dominguez Alegira, and Cynthia Merrill (Kung Fu Panda: Legends of Awesomeness); Paulette Lifton, James Lifton, Mishelle Fordham, DJ Lynch, Jeff Hutchins, Wes Otis, Aran Tanchum, Vincent Guisetti, and Monique Reymond (SpongeBob SquarePants); Jeff Shiffman, Otis Van Osten, Anna Adams, Gerry Gonzalez, Matt Hall, Roger Pallan, John Sanacore, and Alex Ullrich (Teenage Mutant Ninja Turtles)
Outstanding Sound Mixing - Animation	**Carlos Sanches** (Ben 10: Omniverse); Carlos Sanches and Eric Lewis (Young Justice); David Acord and Cameron Davis (Star Wars: The Clone Wars); Justin Brinsfield, Tom Maydeck, Rob McIntrye (Kung Fu Panda: Legends of Awesomeness); Justin Brinsfield, D.J. Lynch, and Ian Nyeste (The Penguins of Madagascar); Gordon Sproule and Dean Giammarco (Slugterra)
Outstanding Sound Editing - Live Action	**Chris Prinzivalli, Michael Barrett, Michael Croier, Jorge Muelle, Chris Sassano, and Dick Maitland** (Sesame Street); Jason Gigg (Joseph Rosendo's Travelscope); Thomas McGurk, Dave Howe, David Gallander, Michael Mcauliffe, and Paul Miller (Biz Kid$)
Outstanding Sound Mixing - Live Action	**Jason Grigg** (Travelscope); Todd Schmidt and Dave Howe (Biz Kid$); Chris Prinzivalli, Michael Barrett, Michael Croiter, and Dick Maitland (Sesame Street)
Outstanding Directing in a Children's Series	**Sesame Street**; The Fresh Beat Band; Pajanimals; R.L. Stine's The Haunting Hour
Outstanding Directing for a Lifestyle Program	**Joseph Rosendo's Travelscope**; Giada at Home; Sandra's Restaurant Remakes; Sara's Weeknight Meals; This Old House
Outstanding Directing for a Talk Show	**The Ellen DeGeneres Show**; Today Show; Katie; Live! with Kelly and Michael; The Talk; The View
Outstanding Hairstyling	**The Talk**; **R.L. Stine's The Haunting Hour**; The Doctors; The Wendy Williams Show
Outstanding Lighting Direction	**The Ellen DeGeneres Show**; Sesame Street; The Wendy Williams Show; The View
Outstanding MakeUp	**The Talk**; Green Screen Adventures; R.L. Stine's The Haunting Hour The Series
Outstanding Main Title Design	**Sesame Street**; Daystar Kids ID; Jeopardy!; NFL Rush Zone - Season of the Guardians; Today
Outstanding Music Direction and Composition	**Scott Kraft, Nadine van der Velde, Ric Markmann, Dan Pinella, Peter Zizzo, and Chris Wagner** (The Fresh Beat Band); Kevin Kiner (Star Wars: The Clone Wars); Adam Berry (The Penguins of Madagascar); Guy Moon (T.U.F.F. Puppy); Evan Lurie, Music Director, and Douglas Wieselman (The Backyardigans); Paul Rudolph, Bill Sherman, and Joseph Fiedler (Sesame Street)
Outstanding Original Song - Children or Animation	**"I Love You Too"** from 3rd & Bird; "Belly Breathe" from Sesame Street; "Elmo the Musical Theme" from Sesame Street; "Forgiveness Song" from Robot and Monster; "If You're A Guy" from Littlest Pet Shop; "Queen of Nacho Pichu" from Sesame Street
Outstanding Writing in Animation	**Tom Martin, Eric Shaw, Jack Ferraiolo, Jayne Hamil, and Ryan Raddatz** (WordGirl); Peter Hirsch, Claudia Silver, Dietrich Smith, and Jon Greenberg (Arthur); Kent Redecker, Noelle Wright, Chris Nee (Doc McStuffins); Peter Hastings, Doug Langdale, Gene Grillo, Paul Rugg, Kevin Seccia, and Scott Kreamer (Kung Fu Panda: Legends of Awesomeness); Ken Scarborough and Joe Fallon (Martha Speaks); Bill Motz, Bob Roth, and Brandon Sawyer (The Penguins of Madagascar)
Outstanding Writing in a Children's Series	**Joey Mazzarino, Molly Boylan, Annie Evans, Christine Ferraro, Emily Perl Kingsley, Luis Santeiro, Ed Valentine, Belinda Ward, John Weidman** (Sesame Street); Dan Angel, Billy Brown, Erik Patterson, Jessica Scott, Melody Fox, Craig S. Phillips, Harold Hayes, Jr., Jack Monaco, Natalie Lapointe, and Greg Yolen (R.L. Stine's The Haunting Hour); Martin Kratt and Chris Kratt (Wild Kratts)
Outstanding New Approaches Enhancement To A Daytime Program or Series	**The Ellen DeGeneres Show**; Little Children, Big Challenges: Divorce; mtvU's Against Our Will Campaign; SciGirls
Outstanding New Approaches Original Daytime Program or Series	**The Beauty Inside**; Chuck Vanderchuck; Design Squad Nation; Get the Math
Outstanding Special Class Writing	**The Ellen DeGeneres Show**; Equitrekking; Joni Show
Outstanding Stunt Coordination	**Days of Our Lives**; The Bold and the Beautiful; General Hospital
Outstanding Lifestyle Program	**Martha** (Hallmark Channel); CAPTURE w/ Mark Seliger; Home & Family; HOOKED UP with Tom Colicchio; My Generation (PBS); This Old House (PBS)
