= Brunch at Bobby's =

Cooking show featuring Bobby Flay

- Genre: Cooking show Food reality television
- Presented by: Bobby Flay
- Country of origin: United States
- Original language: English
- No. of seasons: 7
- No. of episodes: 92

Production
- Executive producers: Bobby Flay; Kim Martin
- Producer: Rock Shrimp Productions
- Running time: 22:00

Original release
- Network: Cooking Channel (October 2010–October 2015); Food Network (May 2016–)
- Release: October 16, 2010 – January 1, 2017

Brunch at Bobby's (stylized as Brunch @ Bobby's) is an American cooking reality television series that aired on Food Network and the Cooking Channel from 2010 to 2017. It is hosted by celebrity chef Bobby Flay, and it features Flay showcasing how to prepare different brunch recipes. The series aired on the Cooking Channel during its first five seasons, but was moved to the Food Network for first-run airings in seasons 6 and 7. As of June 2021, new episodes have not aired since 2017, though the show has not been formally cancelled.

A companion cookbook for the series was released in 2015.
