= List of Trisha's Southern Kitchen episodes =

The American cooking television series Trisha's Southern Kitchen has aired on Food Network since 2012. As of June 2018, 126 episodes of the series have aired over eleven seasons.

== Episodes ==
=== Season 1 ===
No.	Title	Original air date	Production code
1	"Baby in the Band" (Note: "Baby in the Band" was produced as the third episode of the first season, but it aired as the first episode of the season.)	April 14, 2012	TBA
2	"Girlfriends" (Note: "Girlfriends" was produced as the fourth episode of the first season, but it aired as the second episode of the season.)	April 21, 2012	TBA
3	"Grandma Knows Best" (Note: "Grandma Knows Best" was produced as the second episode of the first season, but it aired as the third episode of the season.)	April 28, 2012	TBA
4	"Family Reunion" (Note: "Family Reunion" was produced as the pilot episode, but it aired as the fourth episode of the first season.)	May 5, 2012	TBA
5	"Gwen's Girls" (Note: "Gwen's Girls" was produced as the sixth episode of the first season and "Daddy's Famous Stew" was produced as the fifth episode of the season, but the episodes aired in reverse order.)	May 12, 2012	TBA
6	"Daddy's Famous Stew"	May 19, 2012	TBA

=== Season 2 ===
No.	Title	Original air date	Production code
1	"A Wedding Shower to Remember" (Note: "A Wedding Shower to Remember" was produced as the eighth episode of the second season, but it aired as the first episode of the season.)	October 20, 2012	TBA
2	"Trisha's Tricks and Treats"	October 27, 2012	TBA
3	"Trisha's College Roommate Reunion" (Note: "Trisha's College Roommate Reunion" was produced as the tenth episode of the second season, but it aired as the third episode of the season.)	November 3, 2012	TBA
4	"A Yearwood Thanksgiving" (Note: "A Yearwood Thanksgiving" was produced as the fifth episode of the second season, but it aired as the fourth episode of the season.)	November 10, 2012	TBA
5	"Special Occasion Dinner" (Note: "Special Occasion Dinner" was produced as the thirteenth episode of the second season, but it aired as the fifth episode of the season.)	November 17, 2012	TBA
6	"Garth Brooks is in the Kitchen" (Note: "Garth Brooks is in the Kitchen" was produced as the eleventh episode of the second season, but it aired as the sixth episode of the season.)	November 24, 2012	TBA
7	"Holiday Cookie Party!" (Note: "Holiday Cookie Party!" was produced as the ninth episode of the second season, but it aired as the seventh episode of the season.)	December 1, 2012	TBA
8	"The Yearwood Sunday Supper" (Note: "The Yearwood Sunday Supper" was produced as the third episode of the second season, but it aired as the eighth episode of the season.)	December 8, 2012	TBA
9	"Trisha's Favorite Foods to Gift" (Note: "Trisha's Favorite Foods to Gift" was produced as the first episode of the second season, but it aired as the ninth episode of the season.)	December 15, 2012	TBA
10	"Brunch with Aunt T" (Note: "Brunch with Aunt T" was produced as the sixth episode of the second season, but it aired as the tenth episode of the season.)	December 29, 2012	TBA
11	"Counting Calories Southern Style" (Note: "Counting Calories Southern Style" was produced as the twelfth episode of the second season, but it aired as the eleventh episode of the season.)	January 5, 2013	TBA
12	"Family Fish Fry" (Note: "Family Fish Fry" was produced as the fourth episode of the second season, but it aired as the twelfth episode of the season.)	January 19, 2013	TBA
13	"Football, Friends and Comfort Food" (Note: "Football, Friends and Comfort Food" was produced as the seventh episode of the second season, but it aired as the final episode of the season.)	January 26, 2013	TBA

=== Season 3 ===
No.	Title	Original air date	Production code
1	"Karri-Oke"	May 25, 2013	TBA
2	"Graduation Picnic"	June 1, 2013	TBA
3	"Staycation"	June 8, 2013	TBA
4	"Guy Food"	June 15, 2013	TBA
5	"Z-Girls"	June 22, 2013	TBA
6	"Poker Night" (Note: "Poker Night" was produced as the seventh episode of the third season and "Movie Night" was produced as the sixth episode of the season, but the episodes aired in reverse order.)	June 29, 2013	TBA
7	"Movie Night"	July 6, 2013	TBA
8	"Weeknight Suppers" (Note: "Weeknight Suppers" was produced as the tenth episode of the third season, but it aired as the eighth episode of the season.)	July 13, 2013	TBA
9	"All About Me" (Note: "All About Me" was produced as the eleventh episode of the third season, but it aired as the ninth episode of the season.)	July 20, 2013	TBA
10	"Family Recipes" (Note: "Family Recipes" was produced as the twelfth episode of the third season, but it aired as the tenth episode of the season.)	July 27, 2013	TBA
11	"Rainy Day Food" (Note: "Rainy Day Food" was produced as the final episode of the third season, but it aired as the eleventh episode of the season.)	August 10, 2013	TBA
12	"Breakfast for Supper" (Note: "Breakfast for Supper" was produced as the ninth episode of the third season, but it aired as the twelfth episode of the season.)	August 17, 2013	TBA
13	"Class Reunion" (Note: "Class Reunion" was produced as the eighth episode of the third season, but it aired as the final episode of the season.)	September 14, 2013	TBA

=== Season 4 ===
No.	Title	Original air date	Production code
1	"Retro TV Dinners"	November 9, 2013	TBA
2	"No Fuss Thanksgiving"	November 16, 2013	TBA
3	"Kelly Clarkson in the Kitchen" (Note: "Kelly Clarkson in the Kitchen" was produced as the seventh episode of the fourth season, but it aired as the third episode of the season.)	November 23, 2013	TBA
4	"Redneck Cocktail Party" (Note: "Redneck Cocktail Party" was produced under the title "Sex and the Country".)	November 30, 2013	TBA
5	"Easy Holiday Brunch" (Note: "Easy Holiday Brunch" was produced as the third episode of the fourth season, but it aired as the fifth episode of the season.)	December 7, 2013	TBA
6	"Party Food" (Note: "Party Food" was produced (under the title "Ladies Cocktail Party") as the final episode of the fourth season and "Gold Medal Comfort" was produced (under the title "Gold Medal Meals") as the sixth episode of the season, but the episodes aired in reverse order.)	December 21, 2013	TBA
7	"Healthy Twists" (Note: "Healthy Twists" was produced as the fifth episode of the fourth season, but it aired as the seventh episode of the season.)	January 4, 2014	TBA
8	"Straight Up Comfort Food" (Note: "Straight Up Comfort Food" was produced (under the title "Straight Up Comfort") as the ninth episode of the fourth season, but it aired as the eighth episode of the season.)	January 11, 2014	TBA
9	"Make-Ahead Meals" (Note: "Make-Ahead Meals" was produced as the eleventh episode of the fourth season, but it aired as the ninth episode of the season.)	January 18, 2014	TBA
10	"Feeding the Home Team" (Note: "Feeding the Home Team" was produced as the twelfth episode of the fourth season, but it aired as the tenth episode of the season.)	January 25, 2014	TBA
11	"Indoor Camping" (Note: "Indoor Camping" was produced as the tenth episode of the fourth season, but it aired as the eleventh episode of the season.)	February 1, 2014	TBA
12	"Chocolate, Chocolate and More Chocolate" (Note: "Chocolate, Chocolate and More Chocolate" was produced as the eighth episode of the fourth season, but it aired as the twelfth episode of the season.)	February 8, 2014	TBA
13	"Gold Medal Comfort"	March 1, 2014	TBA

=== Season 5 ===
No.	Title	Original air date	Production code
1	"Southern Basics with a Twist"	August 23, 2014	TBA
2	"Barbecue with a Master" (Note: "Barbecue with a Master" was produced as the eleventh episode of the fifth season, but it aired as the second episode of the season.)	August 30, 2014	TBA
3	"Updated Classics"	September 6, 2014	TBA
4	"Simple Weeknight Solutions" (Note: "Simple Weeknight Solutions" was produced as the seventh episode of the fifth season, but it aired as the fourth episode of the season.)	September 13, 2014	TBA
5	"Feeding Hungry Boys" (Note: "Feeding Hungry Boys" was produced as the fourth episode of the fifth season, but it aired as the fifth episode of the season.)	September 20, 2014	TBA
6	"Boxed Lunch" (Note: "Boxed Lunch" was produced as the second episode of the fifth season, but it aired as the sixth episode of the season.)	September 27, 2014	TBA
7	"All Things Miniature" (Note: "All Things Miniature" was produced as the twelfth episode of the fifth season, but it aired as the seventh episode of the season.)	October 4, 2014	TBA
8	"Surprise Supper" (Note: "Surprise Supper" was produced as the thirteenth episode of the fifth season, but it aired as the eighth episode of the season.)	October 18, 2014	TBA
9	"Blue Plate Special"	October 25, 2014	TBA
10	"Homage to Julia Child" (Note: "Homage to Julia Child" was produced as the fourteenth episode of the fifth season, but it aired as the tenth episode of the season.)	November 1, 2014	TBA
11	"A Romantic Dinner" (Note: "A Romantic Dinner" was produced as the eighth episode of the fifth season, but it aired as the eleventh episode of the season.)	November 8, 2014	TBA
12	"Big Family Thanksgiving" (Note: "Big Family Thanksgiving" was produced as the fifth episode of the fifth season, but it aired as the twelfth episode of the season.)	November 15, 2014	TBA
13	"Just Because Party" (Note: "Just Because Party" was produced as the tenth episode of the fifth season, but it aired as the thirteenth episode of the season.)	November 29, 2014	TBA
14	"Christmas Eve Dinner" (Note: "Christmas Eve Dinner" was produced as the sixth episode of the fifth season, but it aired as the fourteenth episode of the season.)	December 6, 2014	TBA
15	"Slim Down Secrets"	January 3, 2015	TBA

=== Season 6 ===
No.	Title	Original air date	Production code
1	"Weekend Breakfast" (Note: "Weekend Breakfast" was produced as the fifth episode of the sixth season, but it aired as the first episode of the season.)	April 18, 2015	TBA
2	"Comfort to the Max" (Note: "Comfort to the Max" was produced as the first episode of the sixth season, but it aired as the second episode of the season.)	April 25, 2015	TBA
3	"Knockout Dishes"	May 2, 2015	TBA
4	"Mother's Day" (Note: "Mother's Day" was produced as the sixth episode of the sixth season, but it aired as the fourth episode of the season.)	May 9, 2015	TBA
5	"Feel-Good Food" (Note: "Feel-Good Food" was produced as the fourth episode of the sixth season, but it aired as the fifth episode of the season.)	May 16, 2015	TBA
6	"Nashville Memories" (Note: "Nashville Memories" was produced as the eighth episode of the sixth season, but it aired as the sixth episode of the season.)	May 23, 2015	TBA
7	"Family Grilling and Chilling" (Note: "Family Grilling and Chilling" was produced as the ninth episode of the sixth season, but it aired as the seventh episode of the season.)	May 30, 2015	TBA
8	"Record Release Party" (Note: "Record Release Party" was produced as the seventh episode of the sixth season, but it aired as the eighth episode of the season.)	June 13, 2015	TBA
9	"Our Guys' Favorites!" (Note: "Our Guys' Favorites!" was produced as the final episode of the sixth season, but it aired as the ninth episode of the season.)	June 20, 2015	TBA
10	"Glenda's Birthday Costume Party"	June 27, 2015	TBA
11	"Impromptu Get-Together" (Note: "Impromptu Get-Together" was produced as the second episode of the sixth season, but it aired as the final episode of the season.)	July 4, 2015	TBA

=== Season 7 ===
No.	Title	Original air date	Production code
1	"Get Glam Awards Day"	January 2, 2016	TBA
2	"Day Trip to Memphis" (Note: "Day Trip to Memphis" was produced as the eighth episode of the seventh season and "Country Music Hall of Fame" was produced as the second episode of the season, but the episodes aired in reverse order.)	January 9, 2016	TBA
3	"Working Late" (Note: "Working Late" was produced as the fourth episode of the seventh season, but it aired as the third episode of the season.)	January 16, 2016	TBA
4	"Camp Like a Girl" (Note: "Camp Like a Girl" was produced as the seventh episode of the seventh season, but it aired as the fourth episode of the season.)	January 23, 2016	TBA
5	"Game Day 101" (Note: "Game Day 101" was produced as the third episode of the seventh season, but it aired as the fifth episode of the season.)	January 30, 2016	TBA
6	"Biscuit Lovin'"	February 6, 2016	TBA
7	"Trisha's Birthday"	February 13, 2016	TBA
8	"Country Music Hall of Fame"	February 20, 2016	TBA
9	"All Things Cast Iron"	February 27, 2016	TBA
10	"Barbie"	March 12, 2016	TBA
11	"Recipe Swap"	March 19, 2016	TBA
12	"Habitat Build"	April 2, 2016	TBA
13	"Road Food"	April 9, 2016	TBA

=== Season 8 ===
No.	Title	Original air date	Production code
1	"Pizza and a Movie" (Note: "Pizza and a Movie" was produced as the third episode of the eighth season, but it aired as the first episode of the season.)	July 30, 2016	TBA
2	"Let's Get It Percolating" (Note: "Let's Get It Percolating" was produced as the seventh episode of the eighth season, but it aired as the second episode of the season.)	August 6, 2016	TBA
3	"Fan Fare" (Note: "Fan Fare" was produced as the ninth episode of the eighth season, but it aired as the third episode of the season.)	August 13, 2016	TBA
4	"Cooking and Singing with Kids"	August 20, 2016	TBA
5	"Par-T-Que"	September 3, 2016	TBA
6	"Quick-Nic"	September 17, 2016	TBA
7	"Trisha's Day Off" (Note: "Trisha's Day Off" was produced as the first episode of the eighth season, but it aired as the seventh episode of the season.)	September 24, 2016	TBA
8	"Tailgating"	October 8, 2016	TBA
9	"Chop Chop" (Note: "Trisha's Day Off" was produced as the second episode of the eighth season, but it aired as the ninth episode of the season.)	October 15, 2016	TBA
10	"Masquerade and Cocktails"	October 29, 2016	TBA
11	"Giving Thanks"	November 12, 2016	TBA
12	"Sunday Funday"	November 26, 2016	TBA
13	"Cookie Swap"	December 3, 2016	TBA

=== Season 9 ===
No.	Title	Original air date	Production code
1	"Trisha Goes to Boot Camp"	January 7, 2017	TBA
2	"Trisha on Ice" (Note: "Trisha on Ice" was produced as the sixth episode of the ninth season, but it aired as the second episode of the season.)	January 14, 2017	TBA
3	"Money Savers"	January 21, 2017	TBA
4	"Halftime Funtime"	January 28, 2017	TBA
5	"Chocolate Rules"	February 11, 2017	TBA
6	"Picture This!" (Note: "Picture This!" was produced as the twelfth episode of the ninth season, but it aired as the sixth episode of the season.)	February 18, 2017	TBA
7	"Shoebox Memories"	February 25, 2017	TBA
8	"Coffee Talk"	March 18, 2017	TBA
9	"Eggs All Day"	March 25, 2017	TBA
10	"Tour Favorites"	April 1, 2017	TBA
11	"Bringin' Home the Farm"	April 8, 2017	TBA
12	"Book and Wine Club" (Note: "Book and Wine Club" was produced as the second episode of the ninth season, but it aired as the twelfth episode of the season.)	April 22, 2017	TBA
13	"Trisha's Spicy Kitchen"	April 29, 2017	TBA

=== Season 10 ===
No.	Title	Original air date	Production code
1	"Go Nuts for Doughnuts!"	August 19, 2017	TBA
2	"Camp Trisha"	August 26, 2017	TBA
3	"Hawaiian Cookout"	September 2, 2017	TBA
4	"Breakfast-Dinner Mash-Up"	September 9, 2017	TBA
5	"Food, Fast!"	September 16, 2017	TBA
6	"Seeing Double"	September 23, 2017	TBA
7	"Trisha's Open House Tailgate"	September 30, 2017	TBA
8	"Trisha's Halloween Prep"	October 14, 2017	TBA
9	"Trisha Goes Paintballing"	October 21, 2017	TBA
10	"Trisha's Pottery Party"	October 28, 2017	TBA
11	"Trisha's Misfit Thanksgiving"	November 11, 2017	TBA
12	"Concert with Friends"	November 25, 2017	TBA
13	"Ugly Christmas Sweater"	December 2, 2017	TBA

=== Season 11 ===
No.	Title	Original air date	Production code
1	"Jeff Mauro Visits Trisha's Kitchen"	January 13, 2018	TBA
2	"Lunch With Aunt T"	January 20, 2018	TBA
3	"Game Day with the Nashville Predators"	January 27, 2018	TBA
4	"Healthy Kickstart"	February 3, 2018	TBA
5	"Friends and Chocolate"	February 10, 2018	TBA
6	"Guilty Brunch"	February 17, 2018	TBA
7	"Shoebox Memories, Vol. 2"	February 24, 2018	TBA
8	"Opry Goes Pink"	March 3, 2018	TBA
9	"Nashville Food Project"	March 10, 2018	TBA
10	"Sharpen Up!"	March 17, 2018	TBA
11	"Springtime in Nashville"	March 24, 2018	TBA
12	"Tour Wrap Up"	March 31, 2018	TBA
13	"Bret's Graduation"	April 7, 2018	TBA

=== Season 12 ===
No.	Title	Original air date	Production code
1	"The Bluebird Cafe"	July 21, 2018	TBA
2	"Cheese, Please!"	July 28, 2018	TBA
3	"Mexican Fiesta"	August 4, 2018	TBA
4	"Inside Studio T"	August 11, 2018	TBA
5	"Play Like a Girl"	August 18, 2018	TBA
6	"Trisha's Space Kitchen"	August 25, 2018	TBA
7	"Reunion with a Song"	September 1, 2018	TBA
8	"Afternoon Escape"	September 8, 2018	TBA
9	"Stargazing"	September 15, 2018	TBA
10	"Love for Loveless Cafe"	September 22, 2018	TBA
11	"Harlem Globetrotters"	September 29, 2018	TBA
12	"Trisha's Taverna"	October 6, 2018	TBA
13	"Backyard Movie Party"	October 28, 2018	TBA
