= Trisha's Southern Kitchen =

- Genre: Cooking show; Food reality television
- Starring: Trisha Yearwood
- Opening theme: XXX's and OOO's (An American Girl)
- Country of origin: United States
- Original language: English
- No. of seasons: 17
- No. of episodes: 231 (list of episodes)

Production
- Executive producers: Ellen Rakieten (seasons 1–4); Dan Cutforth (seasons 5–7); Jane Lipsitz (seasons 5–7); Beth Burke (season 8–17); Blake Swerdloff-Helms (season 8–17); Trisha Yearwood (season 5–17)
- Production locations: Nashville, Tennessee; United States
- Running time: 22:00
- Production companies: Relativity Media; Ellen Rakieten Entertainment (seasons 1–4); Magical Elves (seasons 5–7); BSTV Entertainment (season 8–17)

Original release
- Network: Food Network
- Release: April 14, 2012 – January 29, 2022

Trisha's Southern Kitchen is an American cooking show that aired on Food Network from April 14, 2012, to January 29, 2022. It is presented by singer and chef Trisha Yearwood; and the series features Yearwood cooking southern-inspired meals for her family and friends.

In 2013, the series won a Daytime Emmy Award (along with fellow Food Network series The Best Thing I Ever Made) for Outstanding Culinary Program.

== Awards and nominations ==
Year	Ceremony	Category	Result
2013	Daytime Emmy	Outstanding Culinary Program	Won
2017	Daytime Emmy	Outstanding Culinary Program	Nominated
2021	Daytime Emmy	Outstanding Culinary Program	Nominated
