= The Best Thing I Ever Made =

- Genre: Cooking show; Food reality television
- Country of origin: United States
- Original language: English
- No. of seasons: 3
- No. of episodes: 32

Production
- Producer: Authentic Entertainment
- Running time: 22:00

Original release
- Network: Food Network
- Release: October 16, 2011 – February 10, 2013

Related
- The Best Thing I Ever Ate

The Best Thing I Ever Made is an American cooking reality television series that aired on Food Network. It featured a rotating lineup of chefs demonstrating how to prepare their favorite recipes. The series is a spin-off of The Best Thing I Ever Ate.

The Best Thing I Ever Made officially premiered on October 16, 2011 and concluded on February 10, 2013, after three seasons. In 2013, the series won a Daytime Emmy Award (along with fellow Food Network series Trisha's Southern Kitchen) for Outstanding Culinary Program.

== Episodes ==
=== Season 1 ===
No.	Title	Original air date	Production code
1	"Comfort Zone"	October 16, 2011	TBA
2	"Desserts"	October 23, 2011	TBA
3	"Hot Stuff"	October 30, 2011	TBA
4	"The Sure Thing"	November 6, 2011	TBA
5	"Family Recipes"	November 13, 2011	TBA
6	"The Breakfast Club"	November 20, 2011	TBA

=== Season 2 ===
No.	Title	Original air date	Production code
1	"Party Food"	April 8, 2012	TBA
2	"Chicken Dinners"	April 15, 2012	TBA
3	"That's Italian"	April 22, 2012	TBA
4	"One-Pot Wonder"	April 29, 2012	TBA
5	"Bring the Heat" (Note: "Bring the Heat" was produced as the sixth episode of the second season, but it aired as the fifth episode of the season.)	May 6, 2012	TBA
6	"Family Dinners" (Note: "Family Dinners" was produced as the seventh episode of the second season, but it aired as the sixth episode of the season.)	May 13, 2012	TBA
7	"Sweet Endings" (Note: "Sweet Endings" was produced as the fifth episode of the second season, but it aired as the seventh episode of the season.)	May 20, 2012	TBA
8	"Garlic Power"	May 27, 2012	TBA
9	"Grilled" (Note: "Grilled" was produced as the tenth episode of the second season, but it aired as the ninth episode of the season.)	June 3, 2012	TBA
10	"Sandwiches" (Note: "Sandwiches" was produced as the eleventh episode of the second season, but it aired as the tenth episode of the season.)	June 10, 2012	TBA
11	"Updated Classics" (Note: "Updated Classics" was produced as the ninth episode of the second season, but it aired as the eleventh episode of the season.)	June 17, 2012	TBA
12	"Say Cheese!"	June 24, 2012	TBA
13	"Burgers and Dogs"	July 1, 2012	TBA

=== Season 3 ===
No.	Title	Original air date	Production code
1	"Fry This!"	October 7, 2012	TBA
2	"Pure Perfection"	October 14, 2012	TBA
3	"Rise and Shine"	October 21, 2012	TBA
4	"Hauntingly Good"	October 28, 2012	TBA
5	"Tasty Travels"	November 4, 2012	TBA
6	"Easy as Pie"	November 11, 2012	TBA
7	"Side by Side"	November 18, 2012	TBA
8	"Rockin' Roasts"	November 25, 2012	TBA
9	"Stocking Stuffers"	December 2, 2012	TBA
10	"Piece of Cake"	December 9, 2012	TBA
11	"Crowd Pleasers"	December 16, 2012	TBA
12	"Meat Lovers"	January 27, 2013	TBA
13	"Chocoholics"	February 10, 2013	TBA
