= Gil Goldschein =

American television producer

- Occupation: Television producer
- Years active: 2007-present
- Known for: Project Runway, Total Divas, Valerie's Home Cooking, Keeping Up with the Kardashians

Gil Goldschein is an American television producer known for his work on Project Runway, Total Divas, Valerie's Home Cooking, and Keeping Up with the Kardashians and its spinoffs.

== Career ==
Goldschein joined Bunim/Murray Productions in 2001 as the director of business and affairs. He later served as general counsel. In 2007, he became chief operating officer. In 2010, Goldschein was promoted to president of Bunim/Murray. In April 2015, Goldschein was promoted to chairman and CEO of Bunim/Murray Productions after founder Jonathan Murray stepped down. He left the company in February 2021.

== Awards ==
Goldschein has received two Emmy Awards for his producing and has been nominated seventeen times. His shows also received a GLAAD Award, three CINE Golden Eagle Awards, one Imagen Award, and a Webby Award.

== Filmography ==
=== Television ===
| Title | Year | Role | Notes | Ref. | | | |
|---|---|---|---|---|---|---|---|
| Title | Year | Role | Notes | Ref. | Bad Girls Road Trip | 2007 | Co-executive producer |
| Murder | 2007 | Co-executive producer | 2 episodes | | | | |
| Dr. Steve-O | 2007 | Co-executive producer | 1 episode | | | | |
| Supreme Court of Comedy | 2007 | Associate producer | | | | | |
| Living Lohan | 2008 | Co-executive producer | 2 episodes | | | | |
| Ski Patrol | 2008 | Executive producer | 2 episodes | | | | |
| Old Skool with Terry and Gita | 2008 | Co-executive producer | 3 episodes | | | | |
| Project Runway: All Star Challenge | 2009 | Co-executive producer | | | | | |
| Styl'd | 2009 | Co-executive producer | | | | | |
| Bad Girls Club Reunion | 2009 | Co-executive producer | | | | | |
| Bad Girls Club | 2007-2010 | Co-executive producer, 42 episodes; Executive producer, 6 episodes | | | | | |
| Models of the Runway | 2009-2010 | Co-executive producer | | | | | |
| Married to Rock | 2010 | Executive producer | | | | | |
| Saddle Ranch | 2011 | Executive producer | | | | | |
| After the Runway | 2011 | Co-Executive producer | 4 episodes | | | | |
| Kourtney & Kim Take New York | 2011-2012 | Executive Producer | | | | | |
| Khloé & Lamar | 2011-2012 | Executive Producer | | | | | |
| Mrs. Eastwood & Company | 2012 | Executive producer | 2 episodes | | | | |
| TRYathlon | 2012 | Executive producer | | | | | |
| Love Games: Bad Girls Need Love Too | 2011-2013 | Executive producer | 19 episodes | | | | |
| Kourtney and Kim Take Miami | 2009-2013 | Executive producer | | | | | |
| Best Ink: Redemption | 2013 | Executive producer | | | | | |
| Bad Girls All-Star Battle | 2013 | Executive producer | | | | | |
| Best Ink | 2013-2014 | Executive producer | 4 episodes | | | | |
| Under the Gunn | 2014 | Executive producer | | | | | |
| Motor City Masters | 2014 | Executive producer | 2 episodes | | | | |
| Kourtney and Khloé Take The Hamptons | 2014-2015 | Executive producer | | | | | |
| Love Thy Sister | 2015 | Executive producer | | | | | |
| Chachi's World | 2015 | producer | | | | | |
| The Challenge | 2013-2015 | Executive producer | 44 episodes | | | | |
| Stewarts & Hamiltons | 2015 | Executive producer | | | | | |
| The Challenge: After Show | 2014-2016 | Executive producer | 3 episodes | | | | |
| Rob & Chyna | 2016 | Executive producer | 1 episode | | | | |
| Total Bellas | 2016 | Executive producer | 1 episode | | | | |
| The Gary Owen Show | 2016 | Executive producer | 1 episode | | | | |
| The Selection: Special Operations Experiment | 2016 | Executive producer | | | | | |
| Mariah's World | 2016-2017 | Executive producer | 4 episodes | | | | |
| So Cosmo | 2017 | Executive producer | | | | | |
| Bill Nye Saves the World | 2017 | Executive producer | 1 episode | | | | |
| Undressed | 2017 | Executive producer | 4 episodes | | | | |
| Ball in the Family | 2017 | Executive producer | | | | | |
| The Healer | 2017 | Executive producer | | | | | |
| Project Runway | 2009-2017 | Co-executive producer | | | | | |
| Life of a Fitness Pop Star | 2018 | Executive producer | | | | | |
| Citizen Rose | 2018 | Executive producer | | | | | |
| Valerie's Home Cooking | 2015-2018 | Executive producer | | | | | |
| Endless Summer | 2018 | Executive producer | | | | | |
| Born This Way | 2015-2018 | Executive producer | | | | | |
| Lindsay Lohan's Beach Club | 2019 | Executive producer | 1 episode | | | | |
| Family or Fiancé | 2019 | Executive producer | | | | | |
| Project Runway All Stars | 2012-2019 | Executive producer | | | | | |
| Total Divas | 2013-2019 | Executive producer | | | | | |
| El Mundo Real | 2019 | Executive producer | | | | | |
| The Crystal Maze | 2020 | Executive producer | | | | | |
| Kirby Jenner | 2020 | Executive producer | | | | | |
| Fear Not with Iyanla Vanzant | 2020 | Executive producer | | | | | |
| Emily's Wonder Lab | 2020 | Executive producer | | | | | |
| Keeping Up with the Kardashians | 2007-2021 | Executive producer | | | | | |

=== Film ===
| Title | Year | Role | Notes | Ref. | | | |
|---|---|---|---|---|---|---|---|
| Title | Year | Role | Notes | Ref. | Pedro | 2008 | Executive producer |
| Shadow Billionaire | 2009 | Executive producer | | | | | |
| Coming Out | 2011 | Executive producer | | | | | |
| Valentine Road | 2013 | Executive producer | | | | | |
| They Call Us Monsters | 2016 | Executive producer | | | | | |
| Hungry | 2016 | Executive producer | | | | | |
| Born This Way Presents: Deaf Out Loud | 2018 | Executive producer | | | | | |
| Kim Kardashian West: The Justice Project | 2020 | Executive producer | | | | | |
| Transhood | 2020 | Executive producer | | | | | |
