= Bobby's Burgers =

American fast casual restaurant

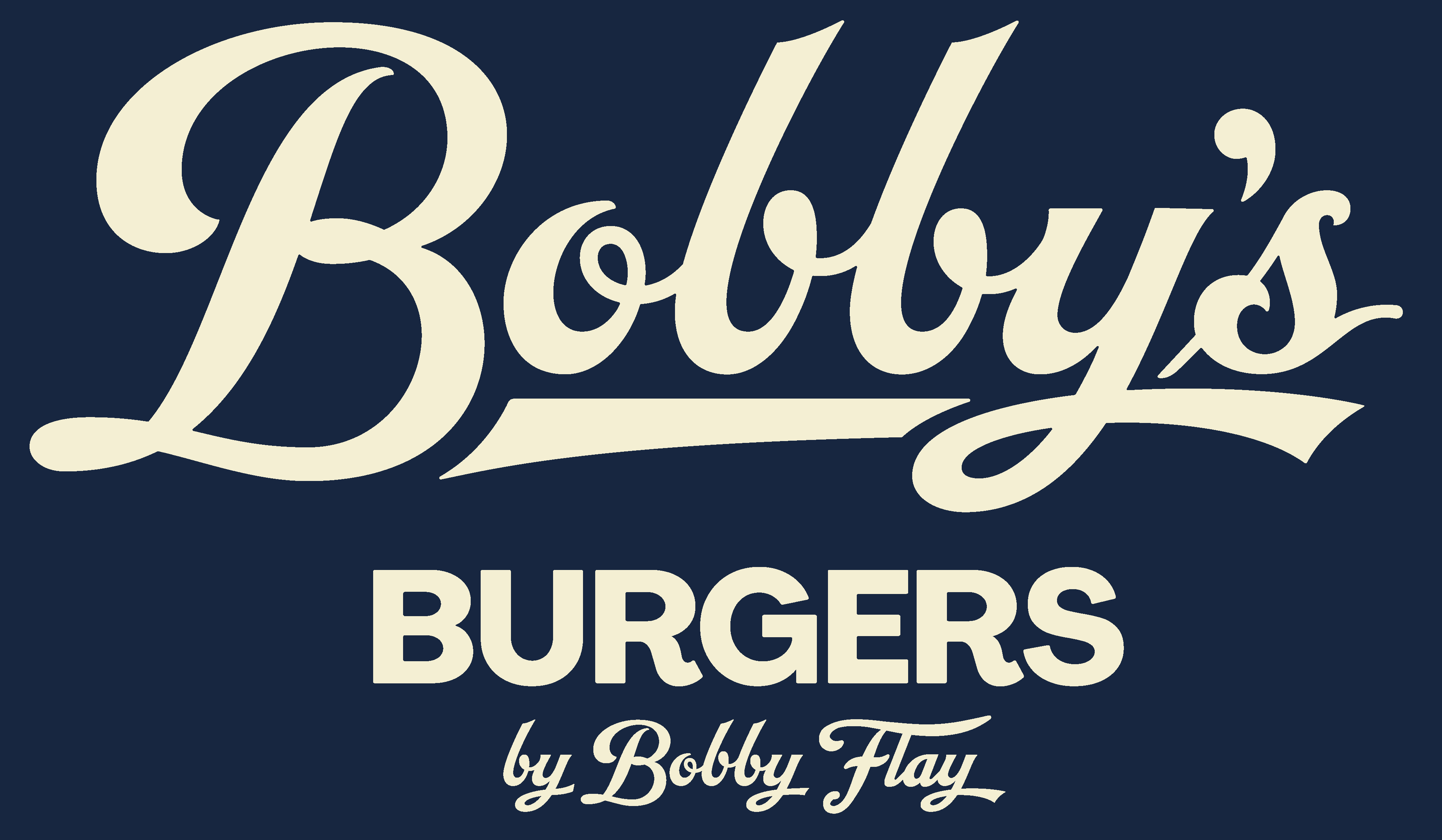

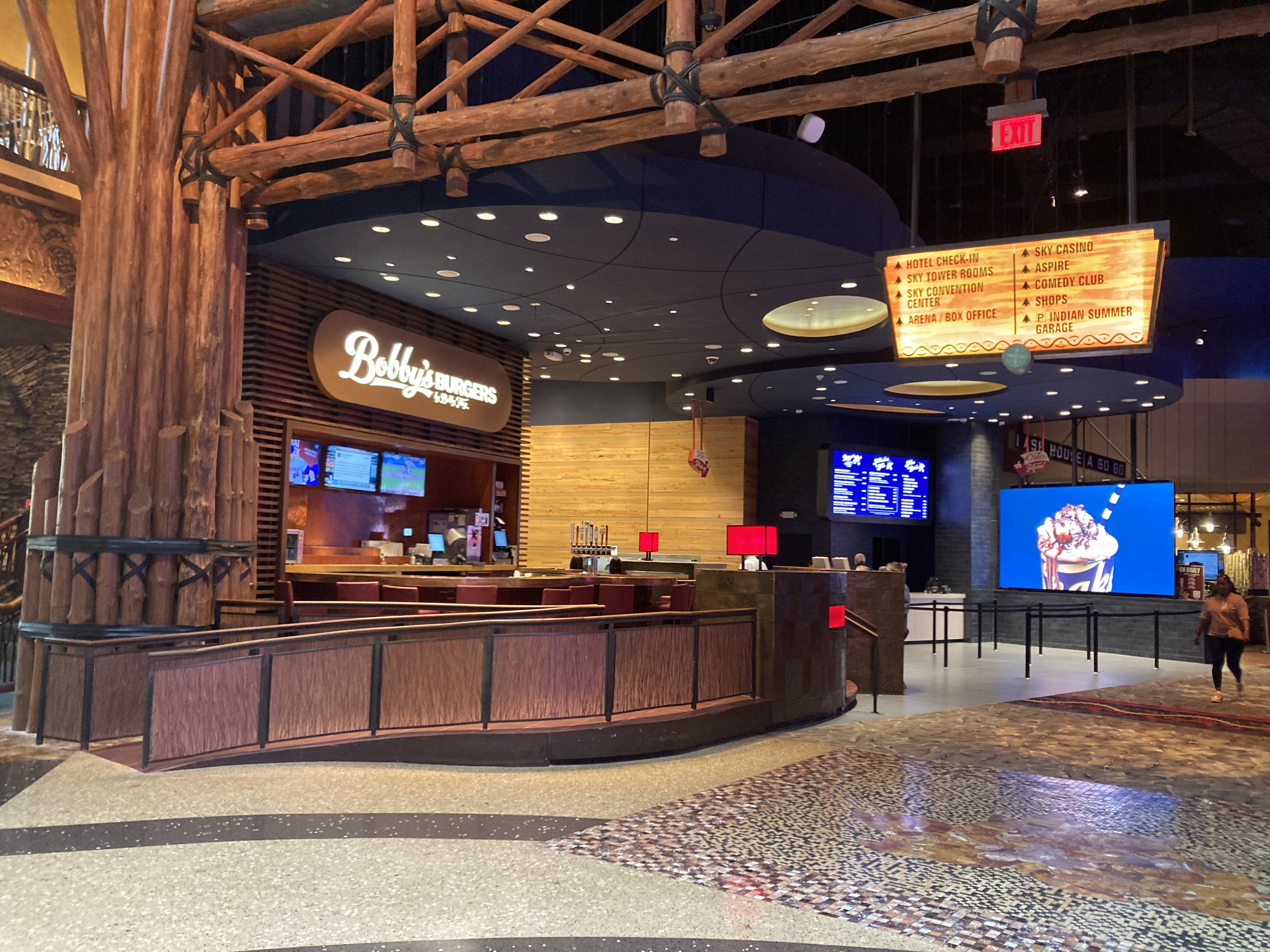
- The Mohegan Sun Bobby's Burgers
- Type: Fast casual restaurant
- Industry: Restaurants
- Founded: 2006; 20 years ago in Eatontown, New Jersey, US (Bobby's Burger Palace), 2021; 5 years ago (Bobby's Burgers)
- Founder: Bobby Flay
- Number of locations: 1 Bobby's Burger Palace, 11 Bobby's Burgers (2026)
- Area served: United States
- Products: Burgers
- Website: bobbysburgerpalace.com bobbysburgers.com

Bobby's Burgers is an upscale group of fast casual restaurants founded by Chef Bobby Flay. It was preceded by Bobby's Burger Palace, which was founded in 2006. Most Bobby's Burger Palace locations closed permanently during the COVID-19 pandemic, and Bobby's Burgers was launched in 2021.

== Menu ==
It focuses on hamburgers, fries, and milkshakes. Customers have the option to crunchify their cheeseburgers, which involves adding potato chips to their ordered cheeseburger. Other menu items include the Bacon Crunchburger, a cheeseburger topped by bacon and potato chips, and the Bobby Blue + Bacon Burger, another cheeseburger topped by blue cheese and bacon.

== Locations and history ==
The first Bobby's Burger Palace location opened in 2006 at the Monmouth Mall in Eatontown, New Jersey. Most of the locations were in New England and the Mid-Atlantic States before the company began expansion outside the area, with locations at the Dadeland Mall in Miami and at the Hard Rock Casino Cincinnati in Ohio which both opened in 2013, and a location on the Las Vegas Strip which opened in 2014.

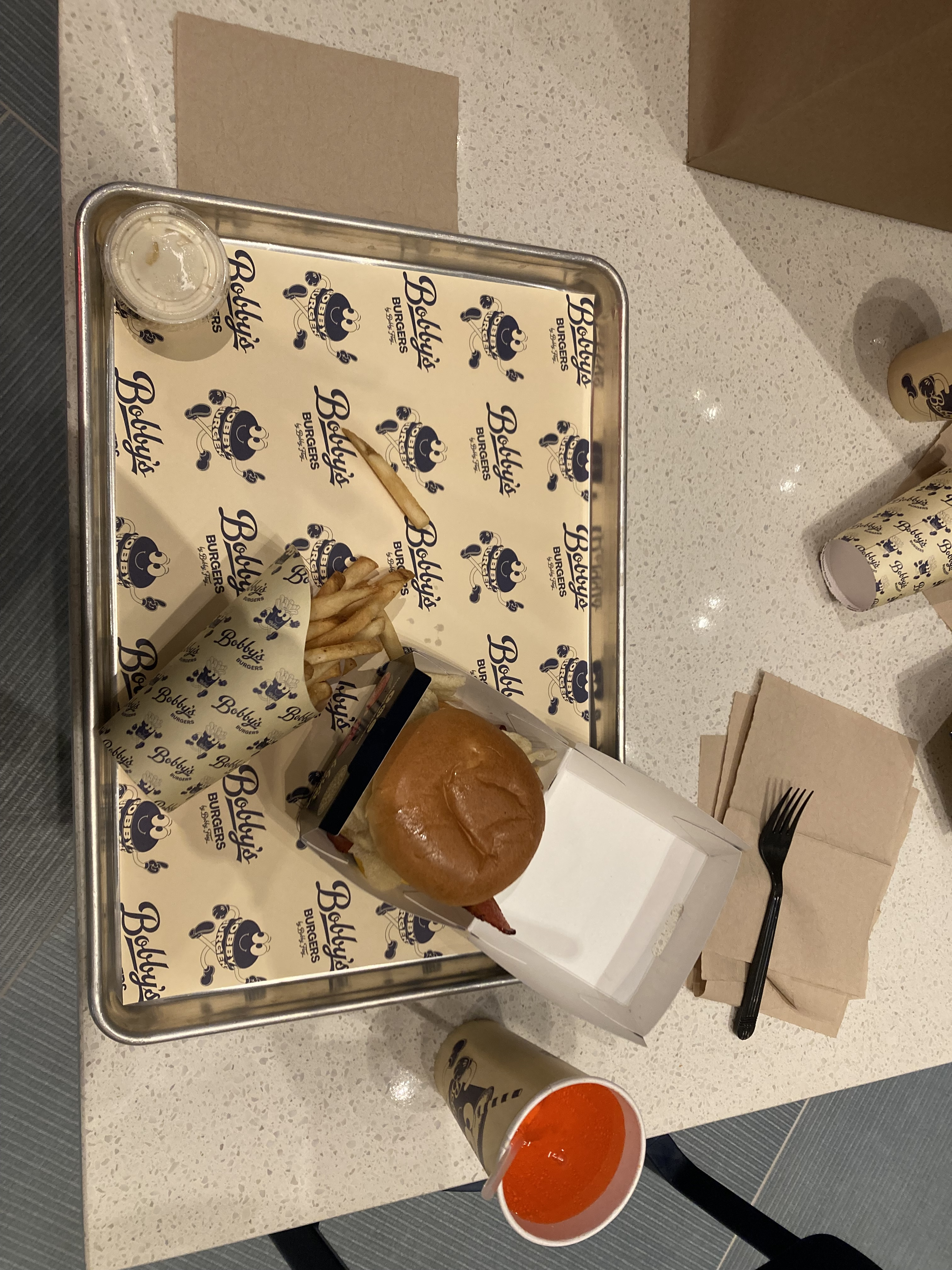
A Bacon Crunchburger with fries and a Fanta Peach

Several outlets closed before and during the COVID-19 pandemic. It closed an outlet at Long Island's Roosevelt Field in June 2019. The brand's initial Lake Grove location closed in mid 2020 due to the COVID-19 pandemic. Bobby Flay opened Bobby's Burgers in 2021. Flay described it as "the next generation of Bobby's Burger Palace, with a fresh identity thanks to new, sleek branding, and a simplified menu featuring our greatest hits." The restaurant announced plans to open a location in The Well in Toronto and signed a lease to open sixty-five locations across Canada. In February 2026, the Mohegan Sun location closed to make way for a new Bobby's Burgers location. It had a soft opening on April 30, with a ribbon-cutting ceremony to be held on May 21. There are eleven Bobby's Burgers locations.

== See also ==
- List of hamburger restaurants
