= Daytime Emmy Award for Outstanding Culinary Program =

Television award

- Awarded for: Outstanding Culinary Program
- Country: United States
- Presented by: National Academy of Television Arts and Sciences
- Currently held by: Be My Guest with Ina Garten; 51st Daytime Emmy Awards (2024)
- Website: theemmys.tv

The Daytime Emmy Award for Outstanding Culinary Program was awarded every year by the National Academy of Television Arts and Sciences between 2010 and 2024. In 2025, it was announced that it will be divided into two specific categories: Outstanding Culinary Instructional Series honoring those shows more instructive in food preparation and cooking, and Outstanding Culinary Cultural Series honoring those shows focused more on the cultural aspects of food.

== Winners and nominees ==
=== 2010s ===
Year	Program	Network	Ref(s)
2010 (37th)
2010 (37th)	Giada at Home	Food Network	
2010 (37th)	America's Test Kitchen	PBS	
2010 (37th)	Gourmet's Adventures with Ruth	PBS	
2010 (37th)	Tyler's Ultimate	Food Network	
2011 (38th)
2011 (38th)	Avec Eric	PBS	
2011 (38th)	America's Test Kitchen	PBS	
2011 (38th)	Cook's Country	PBS	
2011 (38th)	Lidia's Kitchen	PBS	
2011 (38th)	Secrets of a Restaurant Chef	Food Network	
2012 (39th)
2012 (39th)	Bobby Flay's Barbecue Addiction: Season 1	Food Network	
2012 (39th)	Giada at Home	Food Network	
2012 (39th)	Guy's Big Bite	Food Network	
2012 (39th)	Sandwich King	Food Network	
2013 (40th)
2013 (40th)	The Best Thing I Ever Made	Food Network	
2013 (40th)	Trisha's Southern Kitchen	Food Network	
2013 (40th)	Bobby Flay's Barbecue Addiction	Food Network	
2013 (40th)	Giada at Home	Food Network	
2013 (40th)	Recipe Rehab	Syndicated	
2014 (41st)
2014 (41st)	The Mind of a Chef: Season 2	PBS	
2014 (41st)	A Moveable Feast with Fine Cooking	PBS	
2014 (41st)	Beer Geeks	Syndicated	
2014 (41st)	Bobby Flay's Barbecue Addiction	Food Network	
2014 (41st)	Giada at Home	Food Network	
2014 (41st)	My Grandmother's Ravioli	Cooking Channel	
2015 (42nd)
2015 (42nd)	Barefoot Contessa: Back to Basics	Food Network	
2015 (42nd)	Guy's Big Bite	Food Network	
2015 (42nd)	Martha Bakes	PBS	
2015 (42nd)	The Mind of a Chef	PBS	
2015 (42nd)	My Grandmother's Ravioli	Cooking Channel	
2016 (43rd)
2016 (43rd)	Patricia Heaton Parties: Season 1	Food Network	
2016 (43rd)	America's Test Kitchen	PBS	
2016 (43rd)	Cook's Country	PBS	
2016 (43rd)	Giada in Italy	Food Network	
2016 (43rd)	Mexico: One Plate at a Time	PBS	
2016 (43rd)	Pati's Mexican Table	PBS	
2017 (44th)
2017 (44th)	Eat the World with Emeril Lagasse	Amazon Prime Video	
2017 (44th)	America's Test Kitchen	PBS	
2017 (44th)	Barefoot Contessa	Food Network	
2017 (44th)	Guy's Big Bite	Food Network	
2017 (44th)	The Mind of a Chef	PBS	
2017 (44th)	Trisha's Southern Kitchen	Food Network	
2018 (45th)
2018 (45th)	A Chef's Life: Season 5	PBS	
2018 (45th)	Giada Entertains	Food Network	
2018 (45th)	Lidia's Kitchen	PBS	
2018 (45th)	The Mind of a Chef	PBS	
2019 (46th)
2019 (46th)	Valerie's Home Cooking	Food Network	
2019 (46th)	Barefoot Contessa: Cook Like a Pro	Food Network	
2019 (46th)	Cook's Country	PBS	
2019 (46th)	Eat. Race. Win.	Prime Video	
2019 (46th)	Giada Entertains	Food Network	
2019 (46th)	Lidia's Kitchen	PBS	

=== 2020s ===
Year	Program	Network	Ref(s)
2020 (47th)
2020 (47th)	Giada Entertains	Food Network	
2020 (47th)	Barefoot Contessa: Cook Like a Pro	Food Network	
2020 (47th)	Milk Street	PBS	
2020 (47th)	30 Minute Meals	Food Network	
2020 (47th)	Valerie's Home Cooking	Food Network	
2021 (48th)
2021 (48th)	Barefoot Contessa: Cook Like a Pro	Food Network	
2021 (48th)	Lidia's Kitchen	PBS	
2021 (48th)	Lucky Chow	PBS	
2021 (48th)	Mise en Place	Eater	
2021 (48th)	Pati's Mexican Table	PBS	
2021 (48th)	tasteMAKERS	PBS	
2021 (48th)	Trisha's Southern Kitchen	Food Network	
2022 (49th)
2022 (49th)	Barefoot Contessa: Cook Like a Pro	Food Network	
2022 (49th)	Counter Space	Vice TV	
2022 (49th)	Guy's Ranch Kitchen	Food Network	
2022 (49th)	Mary McCartney Serves It Up	discovery+	
2022 (49th)	Valerie's Home Cooking	Food Network	
2023 (50th)
2023 (50th)	José Andrés and Family in Spain	discovery+	
2023 (50th)	Family Dinner	Magnolia Network	
2023 (50th)	Martha Cooks	Roku	
2023 (50th)	Roadfood: Discovering America One Dish at a Time	GBH	
2023 (50th)	Selena + Chef: Season 4	Max	
2024 (51st)
2024 (51st)	Be My Guest with Ina Garten: Season 3	Food Network	
2024 (51st)	Family Dinner	Magnolia Network	
2024 (51st)	Selena + Chef: Home for the Holidays	Max	
2024 (51st)	Valerie's Home Cooking	Food Network	
2024 (51st)	What Am I Eating? with Zooey Deschanel	Max	
2025 (52nd)	Outstanding Culinary Cultural Series		
2025 (52nd)	Chasing Flavor with Carla Hall	Max	
2025 (52nd)	BBQ High	Magnolia Network	
2025 (52nd)	Ingrediente: Mexico	Amazon Prima Video	
2025 (52nd)	TrueSouth	ABC	
2025 (52nd)	Outstanding Culinary Instructional Series		
2025 (52nd)	Delicious Miss Brown	Food Network	
2025 (52nd)	Be My Guest with Ina Garten	Food Network	
2025 (52nd)	Emeril Cooks	Roku	
2025 (52nd)	Lidia's Kitchen	PBS	
2025 (52nd)	Selena + Restaurant	Food Network	

== Multiple nominations ==
=== 6 nominations ===
- Barefoot Contessa

=== 4 nominations ===
- America's Test Kitchen
- Giada at Home
- Guy's Big Bite
- Valerie's Home Cooking

=== 3 nominations ===
- Bobby Flay's Barbecue Addiction
- Cook's Country
- Lidia's Kitchen
- The Mind of a Chef
- Trisha's Southern Kitchen

=== 2 nominations ===
- Family Dinner
- Giada Entertains
- My Grandmother's Ravioli
- Selena + Chef

== Programs with multiple awards ==
=== 2 awards ===
- Be My Guest with Ina Garten

=== 3 awards ===
- Barefoot Contessa

== Channels with multiple wins and nominations ==
=== Wins ===
- Food Network (13)
- PBS (3)

=== Nominations (3 or more) ===
- Food Network (35)
- PBS (26)
- Max (3)
