= Debra Ponzek =

American chef

- Born: Morristown, New Jersey, U.S.
- Education: The Culinary Institute of America
- Spouses: Bobby Flay (m. 1991; div. 1993) Greg Addonizio (after 1994)
- Children: 3
- Culinary career
- Current restaurant: Aux Délices
- Previous restaurant: Montrachet
- Television show: Great Chefs - Great Cities
- Award won: 1992 James Beard Foundation Award for Rising Star Chef
- Website: www.debraponzek.com

Debra Ponzek is an American chef, who won the James Beard Foundation Award for Rising Star Chef in 1992 beating her then-husband Bobby Flay. She is now the owner of Aux Délices restaurants in Connecticut.

== Career ==
Debra Ponzek was born and brought up in Morristown, New Jersey. She studied engineering at Boston University, but dropped out and decided to pursue a career in cooking and attended The Culinary Institute of America in Hyde Park, New York where she graduated in 1984. She would later return to the institute to give the commencement address to the students in 2015. As part of an externship, she worked in Chatham, New Jersey, at the Tarragon Tree restaurant and at Toto Steakhouse in Summit, New Jersey.

Following graduation, she began working under Drew Nieporent at his restaurant Montrachet as a sous chef. Nieporent was an advertising executive who had spotted her when she worked at Toto Steakhouse. She went on to become executive chef at Montrachet for seven years, during which time the restaurant was praised by the food critics of New York City. While there she won the 1992 James Beard Foundation Award for Rising Star Chef. She appeared on the Great Chefs - Great Cities television series, preparing three dishes. Ponzek departed Montrachet in 1994, and opened her own restaurant, Aux Délices in Greenwich, Connecticut. She has since expanded this to multiple sites, and runs cooking classes out of her central kitchen for the restaurants.

== Personal life ==
Ponzek married fellow chef Bobby Flay in May 1991. They had met the previous June and decided to get married within a matter of weeks. They were both nominated for the 1992 James Beard Foundation Award for Rising Star Chef, and Flay attempted to withdraw from the category when he learned he was nominated alongside his wife. The Foundation refused, but when he won the following year, Ponzek presented him with his award.

She later divorced Flay and married Greg Addonizio, moving to Connecticut. When they opened Aux Délices together, Ponzek was pregnant with their first child; they have since had two more.
