= Valerie's Home Cooking =

- Genre: Cooking show; Food reality television
- Starring: Valerie Bertinelli
- Country of origin: United States
- Original language: English
- No. of seasons: 14
- No. of episodes: 172

Production
- Executive producers: Valerie Bertinelli; Scott Freeman; Gil Goldschein; Jack Grossbart; Jonathan Murray; Marc Schwartz; Ronnie Weinstock; Joseph Lecz
- Producer: Susan Hadsell
- Running time: 22 minutes
- Production company: Bunim/Murray Productions

Original release
- Network: Food Network
- Release: August 8, 2015 – July 2, 2023

Valerie's Home Cooking is an American television cooking show, starring Valerie Bertinelli. It premiered on August 8, 2015 on the Food Network channel.

On April 8, 2023, Bertinelli confirmed that the 14th season would be the show's last.

== Episodes ==
=== Series overview ===
Season	Episodes	Originally released	
Season	Episodes	First released	Last released
1	9	August 8, 2015	October 3, 2015
2	13	November 7, 2015	March 19, 2016
3	13	June 11, 2016	September 3, 2016
4	13	September 17, 2016	January 7, 2017
5	13	February 25, 2017	May 27, 2017
6	13	September 16, 2017	December 9, 2017
7	8	January 6, 2018	February 24, 2018
8	12	March 17, 2018	June 17, 2018
9	12	May 12, 2019	July 28, 2019
10	13	November 17, 2019	February 23, 2020
11	10	May 10, 2020	July 12, 2020
12	16	May 9, 2021	September 12, 2021
13	13	April 24, 2022	July 17, 2022
14	13	April 9, 2023	July 2, 2023

=== Season 1 (2015) ===
No. overall	No. in season	Title	Original release date	U.S. viewers (millions)
1	1	"Hot in Cleveland...One More Time"	August 8, 2015	N/A
2	2	"Dinner for My Best Friend!"	August 15, 2015	N/A
3	3	"Pizza Party! Everyone's Tossing"	August 22, 2015	N/A
4	4	"Bootcamp Brunch"	August 29, 2015	N/A
5	5	"Grillin' and Chillin' With the Family"	September 5, 2015	N/A
6	6	"Best Girls' Night In"	September 12, 2015	N/A
7	7	"Last-Minute Dinner Guests"	September 19, 2015	N/A
8	8	"Valerie Gives Back"	September 26, 2015	N/A
9	9	"Football Fun and Food"	October 3, 2015	N/A

=== Season 2 (2015–2016) ===
No. overall	No. in season	Title	Original release date	U.S. viewers (millions)
10	1	"Poker Night"	November 7, 2015	N/A
11	2	"Thanksgiving: The Perfect Bite!"	November 14, 2015	N/A
12	3	"Fab Dinner for My Fab Friends!"	November 28, 2015	N/A
13	4	"Ho! Ho! Ho! Company's Coming"	December 5, 2015	N/A
14	5	"Italian Dinner for a French Chef"	December 12, 2015	N/A
15	6	"After the Ball Is Over"	January 2, 2016	N/A
16	7	"It's a Honey-Do Day"	January 9, 2016	N/A
17	8	"Lazy Sunday Dinner"	January 16, 2016	N/A
18	9	"Chick Flick TV Marathon"	January 23, 2016	N/A
19	10	"Big Game, Big Flavors!"	January 30, 2016	N/A
20	11	"Wolfie's Home!"	February 6, 2016	N/A
21	12	"A Very Valerie Valentine's Day"	February 13, 2016	N/A
21	12	"My Favorite Indulgences"	February 27, 2016	N/A
22	13	"Mighty Neighborly of You"	March 19, 2016	N/A

=== Season 3 (2016) ===
No. overall	No. in season	Title	Original release date	U.S. viewers (millions)
23	1	"Perfect Bites Before"	June 11, 2016	N/A
24	2	"Just Me and My Boys"	June 18, 2016	N/A
25	3	"Too Hot to Cook"	June 25, 2016	N/A
26	4	"Stress-Free Summer Fiesta!"	July 2, 2016	N/A
27	5	"Home Alone...and I Like It"	July 9, 2016	N/A
28	6	"Everything Retro Is New Again"	July 16, 2016	N/A
29	7	"Bang for Your Buck Barbecue"	July 23, 2016	N/A
30	8	"Bacon, Bacon, Bacon: Bacon Makes Everything Better"	July 30, 2016	N/A
31	9	"Only the Best for My Wolfie!"	August 6, 2016	N/A
32	10	"Little Italy in My Kitchen"	August 13, 2016	N/A
33	11	"Kids Baking Championship Reunion"	August 20, 2016	N/A
34	12	"Cheat Day"	August 27, 2016	N/A
35	13	"Summer Grilling Send-Off"	September 3, 2016	N/A

=== Season 4 (2016–2017) ===
No. overall	No. in season	Title	Original release date	U.S. viewers (millions)
36	1	"Quick and Easy Movie Night"	September 17, 2016	N/A
37	2	"Valerie to the Rescue"	September 24, 2016	N/A
38	3	"I Could Do That Blindfolded"	October 1, 2016	N/A
39	4	"4th Down and Yum"	October 8, 2016	N/A
40	5	"Brother vs. Brother"	October 15, 2016	N/A
41	6	"I'm Outta Here"	October 22, 2016	N/A
42	7	"Pumpkins, Sweets and Treats"	October 29, 2016	N/A
43	8	"Oh, the Weather Outside Is Frightful"	November 5, 2016	N/A
44	9	"Thankful for Family"	November 12, 2016	N/A
45	10	"The Days Grow Shorter and the Nights Longer"	November 26, 2016	N/A
46	11	"Blended Holidaze"	December 3, 2016	N/A
47	12	"Jet Lag Dinner"	December 31, 2016	N/A
48	13	"Clean Eats"	January 7, 2017	N/A

=== Season 5 (2017) ===
No. overall	No. in season	Title	Original release date	U.S. viewers (millions)
49	1	"Comfort Food, Cuban-Style"	February 25, 2017	N/A
50	2	"Wine Club Party"	March 4, 2017	N/A
51	3	"My Kind of Town: Chicago"	March 11, 2017	N/A
52	4	"Homemade Happy Hour"	March 18, 2017	N/A
53	5	"Valerie Cooks So-Cal Style"	March 25, 2017	N/A
54	6	"Kitchen Cousins"	April 1, 2017	N/A
55	7	"When Life Gives You Lemons... Rejoice!"	April 8, 2017	N/A
56	8	"Recipe Renovation"	April 15, 2017	N/A
57	9	"Let's Get Social"	April 22, 2017	N/A
58	10	"Happy Birthday Spicy Mud"	April 29, 2017	N/A
59	11	"Old World Meets New World"	May 6, 2017	N/A
60	12	"Dinner Fit for a Queen"	May 13, 2017	N/A
61	13	"All Day Grilling"	May 27, 2017	N/A

=== Season 6 (2017) ===
No. overall	No. in season	Title	Original release date	U.S. viewers (millions)
62	1	"Be Prepared!"	September 16, 2017	N/A
63	2	"Valerie Bertinelli: Ingredient Hunter!"	September 23, 2017	N/A
64	3	"Touchdown!"	September 30, 2017	N/A
65	4	"A Picture Worth Eating"	October 7, 2017	N/A
66	5	"Soup 'n Wiches"	October 14, 2017	N/A
67	6	"It's Payback Time"	October 21, 2017	N/A
68	7	"Tom's Hometown Favorites"	October 28, 2017	N/A
69	8	"My Delaware Days"	November 4, 2017	N/A
70	9	"Gravy and Gratitude"	November 11, 2017	N/A
71	10	"Say Yes to the Veg"	November 18, 2017	N/A
72	11	"Celebrating 20 Years of Friendship"	November 25, 2017	N/A
73	12	"Cookie Party Swap"	December 2, 2017	N/A
74	13	"Tamale Party Time"	December 9, 2017	N/A

=== Season 7 (2018) ===
No. overall	No. in season	Title	Original release date	U.S. viewers (millions)
75	1	"On the Road Again"	January 6, 2018	N/A
76	2	"To Spain for a Little Bit of Everything: Tapas"	January 13, 2018	N/A
77	3	"Come Cassoulet with Me: A Decadent Dinner on a Dime"	January 20, 2018	N/A
78	4	"It's Getting Hot in Here"	January 27, 2018	N/A
79	5	"Surf's Up"	February 3, 2018	N/A
80	6	"Gal-entine's Day"	February 10, 2018	N/A
81	7	"Spicy Mud's New Orleans Favorites"	February 17, 2018	N/A
82	8	"Why Did the Chicken Cross the Road?"	February 24, 2018	N/A

=== Season 8 (2018) ===
No. overall	No. in season	Title	Original release date	U.S. viewers (millions)
83	1	"Hot in Cleveland Reunion"	March 17, 2018	N/A
84	2	"Say Hello to the Flavors of Spring"	March 24, 2018	N/A
85	3	"Bringing the Outdoors In"	April 1, 2018	N/A
86	4	"Amy's in the House!"	April 8, 2018	N/A
87	5	"Dinner and a Movie... Outdoors"	April 15, 2018	N/A
88	6	"Happy Birthday, Luna"	April 22, 2018	N/A
89	7	"No Siesta Fiesta"	April 29, 2018	N/A
90	8	"It's Not Too Late"	May 6, 2018	N/A
91	9	"Traditional Tea-Less Tea Party"	May 13, 2018	N/A
92	10	"Fair Food Fare for the Kids"	May 20, 2018	N/A
93	11	"Patio Party: A Dip for Everyone"	May 27, 2018	N/A
94	12	"All-American Boy"	June 17, 2018	N/A

=== Season 9 (2019) ===
No. overall	No. in season	Title	Original release date	U.S. viewers (millions)
95	1	"Honoring Nonnie"	May 12, 2019	N/A
96	2	"All the Colors of the Rainbow"	May 19, 2019	N/A
97	3	"One More Time, It's a Chicken Dinner"	May 26, 2019	N/A
98	4	"Food! Friends! Fun!"	June 2, 2019	N/A
99	5	"Celebrating Wolf's First Solo Album"	June 9, 2019	N/A
100	6	"Payback Day"	June 16, 2019	N/A
101	7	"Pasta Perfect"	June 23, 2019	N/A
102	8	"Backyard Beach Party"	June 30, 2019	N/A
103	9	"Taco Tuesday, SoCal-Style"	July 7, 2019	N/A
104	10	"Happy Birthday, John!"	July 14, 2019	N/A
105	11	"Ante Up"	July 21, 2019	N/A
106	12	"Cooks in the House!"	July 28, 2019	N/A
107	13	"Busy Mom's Weeknight Dinner"	August 4, 2019	N/A

=== Season 10 (2019–2020) ===
No. overall	No. in season	Title	Original release date	U.S. viewers (millions)
108	1	"Thanksgiving, SoCal-Style"	November 17, 2019	N/A
109	2	"Reinventing Fall Foods"	November 24, 2019	N/A
110	3	"Celebrating Mothers, Daughters and Daughters-in-Law"	December 1, 2019	N/A
111	4	"Tikis and Tinsel"	December 15, 2019	N/A
112	5	"I'm Dreaming of a White... Elephant?"	December 22, 2019	N/A
113	6	"Anniversary Brunch"	December 29, 2019	N/A
114	7	"Turning Over a New Leaf"	January 5, 2020	N/A
115	8	"Twin City Treats"	January 12, 2020	N/A
116	9	"Cook Once, Eat for a Week"	January 19, 2020	N/A
117	10	"Welcome Home, Newlyweds!"	January 26, 2020	N/A
118	11	"Winging It and Beyond"	February 2, 2020	N/A
119	12	"A Heart-y Valentine's Day"	February 9, 2020	N/A
120	13	"Kids Baking Championship Homecoming Day"	February 23, 2020	N/A

=== Season 11 (2020) ===
No. overall	No. in season	Title	Original release date	U.S. viewers (millions)
121	1	"If Mama Ain't Happy..."	May 10, 2020	N/A
122	2	"It's Cat-urday"	May 17, 2020	N/A
123	3	"Take Me Out to the Ball Game"	May 24, 2020	N/A
124	4	"Chicken Cacciatore for the Soul"	May 31, 2020	N/A
125	5	"Reunited and It Tastes So Good"	June 7, 2020	N/A
126	6	"Sicilian Splash Party"	June 14, 2020	N/A
127	7	"The Bertinelli Boys Are Back in Town"	June 21, 2020	N/A
128	8	"Fireworks Make the World Go Round"	June 28, 2020	N/A
129	9	"Bayou Bash Brunch"	July 5, 2020	N/A
130	10	"Lights, Camera... Eat"	July 12, 2020	N/A

=== Season 12 (2021) ===
No. overall	No. in season	Title	Original release date	U.S. viewers (millions)
131	1	"Starry Movie Night"	May 9, 2021	N/A
132	2	"Gratitude to First Responders"	May 16, 2021	N/A
133	3	"Today is Gonna Be a Great Day"	May 23, 2021	N/A
134	4	"Buns of Anarchy"	May 30, 2021	N/A
135	5	"A Bite Out of Memory Lane"	June 6, 2021	N/A
136	6	"I'm Very Fondue of You"	June 13, 2021	N/A
137	7	"Late-Night Feedings (For New Mom and Dad)"	June 20, 2021	N/A
138	8	"Easy Breezy Brunch"	June 27, 2021	N/A
139	9	"Daily Gratitude"	July 11, 2021	N/A
140	10	"How the Cookie Crumbles"	July 18, 2021	N/A
141	11	"A Trip to the Mediterranean"	August 1, 2021	N/A
142	12	"Comforts of Home"	August 8, 2021	N/A
143	13	"The Art of Gifting"	August 15, 2021	N/A
144	14	"A Meal for All the Senses"	August 22, 2021	N/A
145	15	"Week Knight Dinner"	September 5, 2021	N/A
146	16	"Superfan Supper Club"	September 12, 2021	N/A

=== Season 13 (2022) ===
No. overall	No. in season	Title	Original release date	Viewers (millions)
147	1	"Spring Cleaning"	April 24, 2022	1.04
148	2	"Cooking the Books"	May 1, 2022	0.83
149	3	"Warm as a Mother's Hug"	May 8, 2022	0.86
150	4	"Elevated Breakfast for Dinner"	May 15, 2022	0.82
151	5	"Warm Days and Chili Nights"	May 22, 2022	0.79
152	6	"Parsley, Sage, Rosemary and Thyme"	May 29, 2022	0.81
153	7	"Deceptively Easy"	June 5, 2022	0.77
154	8	"Retro Refresh"	June 12, 2022	0.86
155	9	"Sunday Gravy"	June 19, 2022	0.86
156	10	"American as Cherry Pie"	June 26, 2022	0.80
157	11	"A Feast for All"	July 3, 2022	0.79
158	12	"Surprise Beach Birthday"	July 10, 2022	0.71
159	13	"25 Years of Book Group"	July 17, 2022	0.71

=== Season 14 (2023) ===
No. overall	No. in season	Title	Original release date	Viewers (millions)
160	1	"Masterpiece Eater"	April 9, 2023	0.85
161	2	"Happy, Happy"	April 16, 2023	0.79
162	3	"Southern California Wedding"	April 23, 2023	0.70
163	4	"Friends Through the Years"	April 30, 2023	0.84
164	5	"Mom's Recipe Box"	May 7, 2023	0.76
165	6	"Recording Studio Stock Up"	May 14, 2023	0.73
166	7	"Recipe Roadmaps"	May 21, 2023	0.77
167	8	"Super Fan Supper Club 2.0"	May 28, 2023	0.72
168	9	"Indulgence Without the Guilt"	June 4, 2023	0.68
169	10	"The Art of the Sound Bite"	June 11, 2023	0.66
170	11	"ABCs of Summer Entertaining"	June 18, 2023	0.78
171	12	"A Festive Family Fourth"	June 25, 2023	0.74
172	13	"Betty White Tribute"	July 2, 2023	N/A

== Awards and nominations ==
Year	Category	Institution or publication	Result	Notes	Ref.
2018	Outstanding Culinary Program	Daytime Emmy Awards	Nominated		
2019	Outstanding Culinary Host	Daytime Emmy Awards	Won		
2019	Outstanding Culinary Program	Daytime Emmy Awards	Won		
2020	Outstanding Culinary Series	Daytime Emmy Awards	Nominated		
