= Bobby Flay =

American celebrity chef (born 1964)

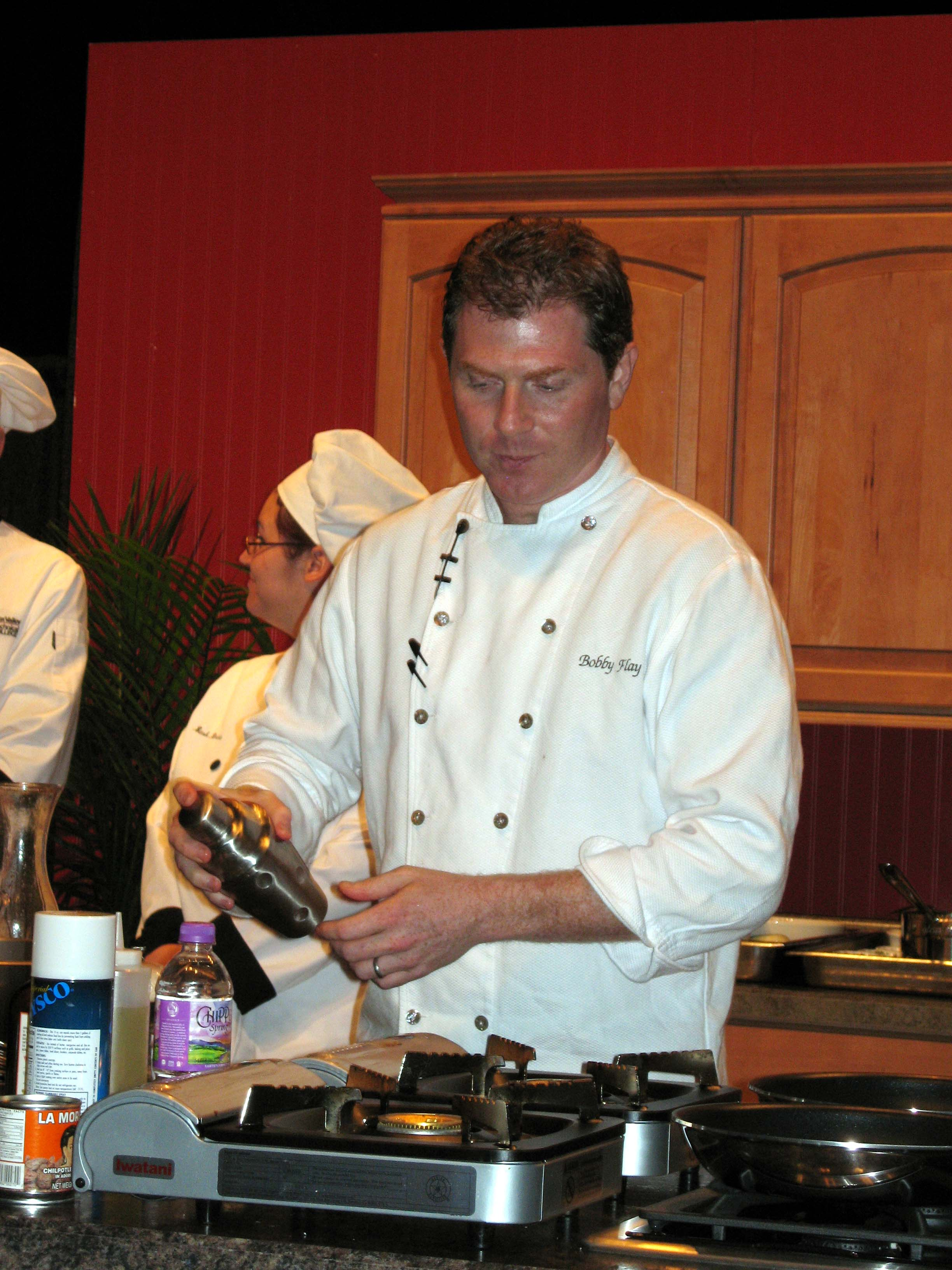
- Flay in 2007
- Born: Robert William Flay; December 10, 1964 (age 61); New York City, U.S.
- Education: French Culinary Institute
- Spouses: Debra Ponzek (m. 1991; div. 1993) Kate Connelly (m. 1995; div. 1998) Stephanie March (m. 2005; div. 2015)
- Children: Sophie Flay
- Culinary career
- Cooking style: Southwest
- Current restaurants
- Amalfi (Las Vegas); Bobby's Burger Palace (Uncasville, Connecticut; Atlanta, Georgia); Bobby's Burgers (Caesar's Palace, Harrah's, and Paris Las Vegas; Yankee Stadium New York; Charlotte, North Carolina); Brasserie B Parisian Steakhouse (Caesar's Palace, Las Vegas)
- Previous restaurants
- Bar Americain (New York City); Bar Americain at Mohegan Sun (Uncasville, Connecticut); Bolo Bar & Restaurant (New York City; November 1993 – December 31, 2007); Mesa Grill (New York City; 1991–2013); Mesa Grill (Las Vegas; remodeled into Amalfi); Bobby's Burger Palace (Towson, Maryland; Burlington, Massachusetts; 2013–2016); Gato (New York City; 2014–2021); Bobby Flay Steak (Atlantic City; 2006–2021); Shark (Las Vegas)
- Television shows
- America's Next Great Restaurant; BBQ Brawl: Flay v. Symon; BBQ with Bobby Flay; Boy Meets Grill; Beat Bobby Flay; Brunch @ Bobby's; FoodNation; Grillin' & Chillin'; Grill It! with Bobby Flay; Hot Off the Grill with Bobby Flay; Iron Chef America; The Main Ingredient with Bobby Flay; Throwdown! with Bobby Flay; Worst Cooks in America; Bobby and Giada in Italy; Bobby's Triple Threat; Bobby Flay’s The Line
- Website: www.bobbyflay.com

Robert William Flay (born December 10, 1964) is an American celebrity chef, food writer, restaurateur, and television personality. Flay is the owner and executive chef of several restaurants and franchises, including Bobby's Burger Palace, Bobby's Burgers, and Amalfi. He has appeared on Food Network since 1995, which won him four Daytime Emmy Awards and a star on the Hollywood Walk of Fame.

== Early life ==
Flay was born on December 10, 1964, in New York City, to Bill and Dorothy Barbara (McGuirk) Flay. He was raised on the Upper East Side of Manhattan. He is a fourth-generation Irish American and was raised Catholic, attending denominational schools.

At age 8, Flay asked for an Easy-Bake Oven for Christmas. His father thought that a G.I. Joe would be more appropriate. Despite his father's objections, he received them both.

== Career ==
Flay dropped out of high school at age 17. He said that his first jobs in the restaurant industry were at a pizza parlor and Baskin-Robbins. He then took a position making salads at Joe Allen Restaurant in Manhattan's Theater District, where his father was a partner. The owner, Joe Allen, was impressed by Flay's natural ability and agreed to pay his partner's son's tuition at the French Culinary Institute.

Flay received a degree in culinary arts and was a member of the first graduating class of the French Culinary Institute in 1984. After culinary school, he started working as a sous-chef, quickly learning the culinary arts. At the Brighton Grill on Third Avenue, Flay was handed the executive chef position a week after the executive chef was fired. Flay quit when he realized he was not ready to run a kitchen. He took a position as a chef working for restaurateur Jonathan Waxman at Bud and Jams. Waxman introduced Flay to southwestern, which came to define his culinary career.

After working for a short time on the floor at the American Stock Exchange, Flay returned to the kitchen as the executive chef of Miracle Grill in the East Village, where he worked from 1988 to 1990. He caught the attention of Jerome Kretchmer, who was looking for a southwestern-style chef. Impressed by Flay's food, Kretchmer offered him the position of executive chef of Mesa Grill, which opened on January 15, 1991. Shortly after, he became a partner. In November 1993, Flay partnered with Laurence Kretchmer to open Bolo Bar & Restaurant in the Flatiron District, just a few blocks away from Mesa Grill.

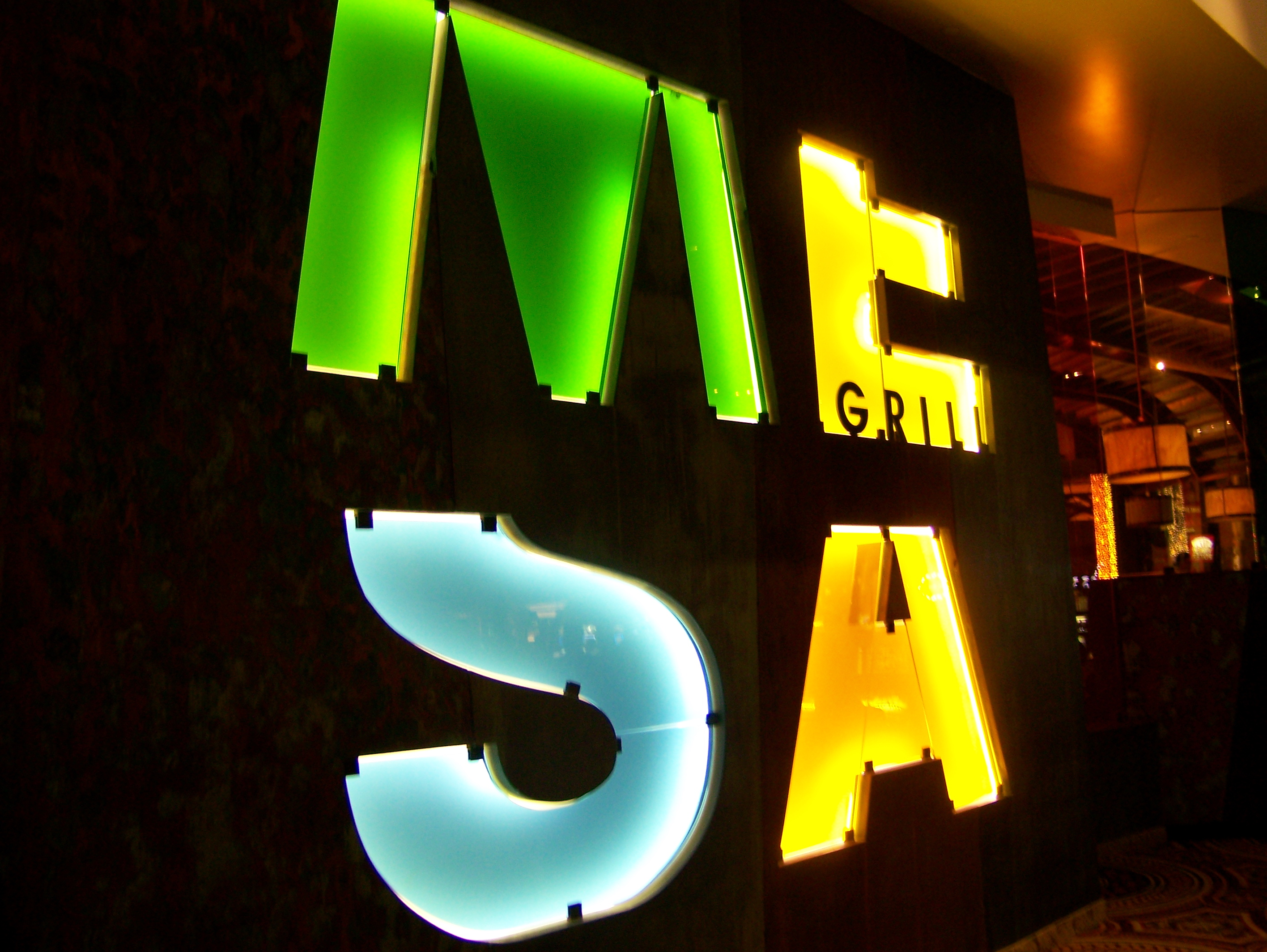
Entrance sign to Mesa Grill in Caesars Palace, Las Vegas

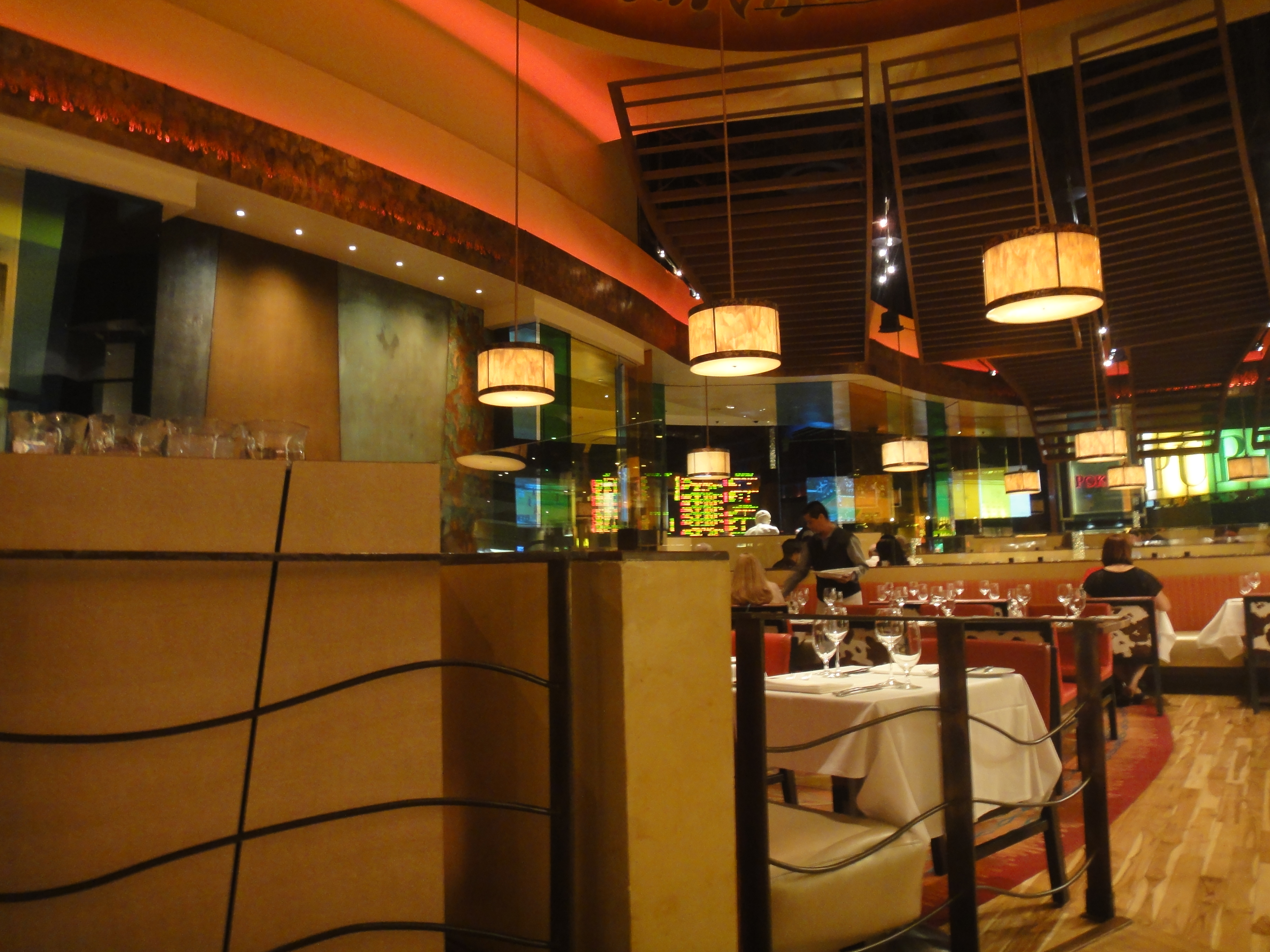
Mesa Grill at Las Vegas

Flay opened a second Mesa Grill at Caesars Palace in Las Vegas in 2004, and in 2005 he opened Bar Americain, an American Brasserie, in Midtown Manhattan. He continued to expand his restaurants by opening Bobby Flay Steak in the Borgata Hotel Casino & Spa in Atlantic City, New Jersey. This was followed by a third Mesa Grill in the Bahamas, located in The Cove at Atlantis Paradise Island, which opened on March 28, 2007. The Las Vegas Mesa Grill earned Flay his only Michelin Star in 2008, which was taken away in the 2009 edition. Michelin did not publish a 2010 or 2011 Las Vegas edition, so the star could not be re-earned.

Bolo Bar & Restaurant closed its doors on December 31, 2007, to make way for a condominium.

Aside from his restaurants and television shows, Flay has been a master instructor and visiting chef at the French Culinary Institute. Although he is not currently teaching classes, he occasionally visits when his schedule permits.

Flay established the Bobby Flay Scholarship in 2003. This full scholarship to the French Culinary Institute is awarded annually to a student in the Long Island City Culinary Arts Program. Flay personally helps select the awardee each year.

Flay opened his first Bobby's Burger Palace (BBP) at the Smith Haven Mall in Lake Grove, Long Island, on July 15, 2008. At its peak, BBP had nineteen locations in eleven states and the District of Columbia.

The original Mesa Grill in New York closed in September 2013 following a proposed rent increase by the landlord.

In May 2021, Mesa Grill in Caesars Palace was converted to an Italian restaurant called Amalfi by Bobby Flay. He also updated the menu and changed the name of his Las Vegas Bobby's Burger Palace to Bobby's Burgers. He now has four locations of Bobby's Burgers in Caesars Palace Las Vegas, Paris Hotel Las Vegas, Harrah's Las Vegas, and Yankee Stadium in New York City.

As of September 2019, Flay has an estimated net worth of $30 million.

== Other ventures ==
=== Food Network and television ===
Bobby Flay speaking with President Obama in 2009

Flay has hosted seventeen cooking shows and specials on both Food Network and Cooking Channel:

- Hot Off the Grill with Bobby Flay (no longer airing)
- Grillin' & Chillin' (no longer airing)
- Food Nation (no longer airing)
- 3 Days to Open with Bobby Flay (no longer airing)
- Boy Meets Grill (2002–11)
- BBQ with Bobby Flay (2004–07)
- Throwdown! with Bobby Flay (2006–10)
- Grill It! with Bobby Flay
- Bobby Flay's Barbecue Addiction (summer/fall, 2011–2014)
- The Best Thing I Ever Ate (premiered June 2009)
- Brunch @ Bobby's (2010–2017)
- Worst Cooks in America (seasons 3–5, 17)
- The Main Ingredient with Bobby Flay
- Bobby's Dinner Battle (premiered January 16, 2013)
- Beat Bobby Flay (premiered August 24, 2013)
- The Bobby And Damaris Show (premiered September 3, 2017)
- Bobby's Triple Threat (premiered September 27, 2022)

Flay served as a judge on Wickedly Perfect, The Next Food Network Star, and The Next Iron Chef. He has cooked on Emeril Live and Paula's Party.

On Throwdown! with Bobby Flay, Flay challenges cooks known for a specific dish or type of cooking to a cook-off of their signature dish. Flay was an Iron Chef on the show Iron Chef America. In 2000, when the original Iron Chef show traveled to New York for a special battle, he challenged Iron Chef Masaharu Morimoto to battle rock crab. After the hour battle ended, Flay stood on top of his cutting board and raised his arms in what one journalist wrote was "premature victory". As Morimoto felt that real chefs consider cutting boards and knives sacred, and being offended by Flay's flamboyant gesture, he criticized his professionalism, saying that Flay was "not a chef". Flay went on to lose the battle. Flay challenged Morimoto to a rematch in Morimoto's native Japan. This time, Flay won.

On a special episode of Iron Chef America originally airing on November 12, 2006, Flay and Giada De Laurentiis faced off against, and were defeated by, Batali and Rachael Ray. This was the highest rated show ever broadcast on Food Network. Flay and Michael Symon defeated the team of Iron Chefs Cat Cora and Masaharu Morimoto in a special episode titled "Thanksgiving Showdown", which originally aired on November 16, 2008. In an episode recorded in July 2010 and broadcast in March 2011, Montreal cooking show host Chuck Hughes beat Flay to become the youngest Canadian champ.

Beat Bobby Flay pits select chefs against Flay to see if they can create dishes that are better than his.

His specials include:

- Bobby's Vegas Gamble – Covers the opening of Mesa Grill Las Vegas.
- Restaurant Revamp – Flay tries to help a family restaurant.
- Chefography: Bobby Flay – Biography of Flay's life and career.
- Tasting Ireland – Flay takes a food tour of Ireland, his ancestral homeland.
- Food Network Awards – The Food Network recognizes people and places that have impacted the food world.
- All-Star Grill Fest: South Beach – Flay joins Paula Deen, Giada De Laurentiis, Alton Brown, and Tyler Florence for a barbecue.

In October 2021, Variety reported that Flay would leave Food Network after a 27-year run, after he and the network failed to reach an agreement on a new contract. People reported that Flay had sought $100 million as part of the proposal. In November 2021, it was reported that Flay had signed a new three-year deal with Food Network.

==== Other cooking shows ====
In 1996, Flay hosted The Main Ingredient with Bobby Flay on Lifetime Television. Twice a month, he hosts a cooking segment on CBS's The Early Show. He hosted the reality television show America's Next Great Restaurant on NBC from March to May 2011 in which in the end he picks one restaurant team with whom to open a restaurant. The show was canceled after the first season due to low ratings.

Flay has been featured in several episodes of Great Chefs television including:

- Great Chefs – Great Cities
- Mexican Madness DVD
- Great Chefs Cook American

=== Acting roles ===
Flay had a cameo appearance in the Disney Channel original movie Eddie's Million Dollar Cook-Off as the host of the cook-off. He appeared on the television game show Pyramid with fellow Iron Chef Mario Batali as the guest celebrities in an episode originally airing on November 18, 2003. He appeared as a judge on the CBS television show "Wickedly Perfect" during the 2004–05 season. He also appeared in the Law & Order: Special Victims Unit episode "Design", which originally aired on September 22, 2005. He had a small role as himself in the 2006 film East Broadway, in which his then-wife, Stephanie March, had a larger role.

Jeopardy! featured a special "Throwdown with Bobby Flay" category during the March 12, 2008, episode, in which each of the clues featured Flay. He participated in the 2008 Taco Bell All-Star Legends and Celebrity Softball Game played at Yankee Stadium after the 2008 MLB All Star Game; Flay played for the National League. Flay is mentioned in the 2008 film Step Brothers in the "Derek comes for dinner" scene.

In 2010, Flay was impersonated in the South Park cartoon episode "Crème Fraiche". In 2011, Flay had recurring appearances in the final season of Entourage as the boyfriend of Ari Gold's wife. In 2012, Flay appeared on Portlandia in a director's cut of the episode Brunch Village in which he showed director Jonathan Krisel how to make marionberry pancakes. Flay guest stars as himself on season two of the TV series Younger, which initially aired in 2016.

In 2018, he appeared as Fred Jones' uncle in the animated film Scooby-Doo! and the Gourmet Ghost.

Flay played a food and restaurant critic in the 2022 seasonal made-for-TV movie One Delicious Christmas.

In 2024, Flay starred in a television commercial in which he dances while promoting Pepsi in conjunction with grilling.

=== Sirius XM Radio ===
In 2009, Flay hosted a weekly call-in show on Sirius XM Satellite Radio. He offered advice to men on "everything from sports to current issues", although food was the focus.

=== Made by Nacho ===
In April 2021, Flay, with Elly Truesdell and Katja Lang, launched Made by Nacho, a premium cat food company named for his Maine Coon, Nacho Flay. The brand sells wet cat food, dry kibble, and freeze-dried protein treats. Made by Nacho sells cat food from their website and in PetSmart in addition to offering a subscription service. Flay has also founded the Made By Nacho Charitable Fund as part of The New York Community Trust.

=== Books ===
Flay has authored several cookbooks, including:

- Bobby Flay's Bold American Food (Warner Books, May 31, 1994) – ISBN 978-0-4465-1724-9
- Bobby Flay's From My Kitchen to Your Table (Clarkson Potter, March 31, 1998) – ISBN 978-0-517-70729-6
- Bobby Flay's Boy Meets Grill (Hyperion, May 19, 1999) – ISBN 978-0-7868-6490-4
- Bobby Flay Cooks American (Hyperion, September 30, 2001) – ISBN 978-0-7868-6714-1
- Bobby Flay's Boy Gets Grill (Scribner, May 18, 2004) – ISBN 978-0-7432-5481-6
- Bobby Flay's Grilling For Life (Scribner, May 3, 2005) – ISBN 978-0-7432-7272-8
- Bobby Flay's Mesa Grill Cookbook (Clarkson Potter, October 16, 2007) – ISBN 978-0-3073-5141-8
- Bobby Flay's Grill It! (Clarkson Potter, April 18, 2008) – ISBN 978-0-3073-5142-5
- Bobby Flay's Burgers, Fries and Shakes (Clarkson Potter, April 11, 2009) – ISBN 978-0-3074-6063-9
- Bobby Flay's Bar Americain Cookbook: Celebrate America's Great Flavors (Clarkson Potter, September 20, 2011) – ISBN 978-0-307-46138-4
- Bobby Flay's Throwdown (Clarkson Potter, October 12, 2012) – ISBN 978-0-3077-1916-4
- Bobby Flay's Barbecue Addiction (Clarkson Potter, April 23, 2013) – ISBN 978-0-3074-6139-1
- Bobby Flay Fit: 200 Recipes for a Healthy Lifestyle (Co-authors: Stephanie Banyas and Sally Jackson; Publisher – Clarkson Potter, December 5, 2017) - ISBN 978-0-3853-4593-4
- Bobby at Home: Fearless Flavors from My Kitchen (Clarkson Potter, September 24, 2019) – ISBN 978-0-3853-4591-0

== Personal life ==
Flay married Debra Ponzek, also a chef, on May 11, 1991. Flay and Ponzek divorced in 1993, and Flay married his second wife, Kate Connelly, in 1995. They have a daughter, Sophie Flay. Flay and Connelly separated in 1998 and later divorced. Flay married actress Stephanie March on February 20, 2005. March and Flay divorced in July 2015. Flay dated Heléne Yorke from February 2016 to early 2019. In November 2021, Flay went public with girlfriend Christina Perez after about a year of dating. The couple broke up in 2024. As of March 2025, Flay is in a relationship with fellow chef Brooke Williamson.

Flay is a self-proclaimed 'cat person' and has lived with cats most of his life. He has had three Maine Coons: Nacho, an orange tabby Maine Coon; Stella, a brown tabby Maine Coon five years younger than Nacho; and Canelo. In October 2023, Flay announced that Nacho had died.

Flay has an interest in thoroughbred horse racing, and is the owner of graded stakes race winners:

- More Than Real, who won the prestigious 2010 Breeders' Cup Juvenile Fillies Turf;
- Creator (part owner), who won the third jewel of the Triple Crown, the Belmont Stakes in 2016; and
- Pizza Bianca, a homebred filly who won the 2021 Breeders' Cup Juvenile Fillies Turf.

Flay served on the Breeders' Cup board of directors from 2014 to 2018.

== Awards and accolades ==
- New York Magazine Gael Greene's Restaurant of the Year – Mesa Grill (1992)
- French Culinary Institute Outstanding Graduate Award (1993)
- International Association of Culinary Professionals Award for Design – Bobby Flay's Bold American Food (1995)
- Four-time Daytime Emmy Award winner:
  - Outstanding Service Show Host – Boy Meets Grill (2005)
  - Best Culinary Program – Grill It! With Bobby Flay (2009)
  - Outstanding Culinary Host – Bobby Flay's Barbecue Addiction (2014)
  - Outstanding Culinary Host – Bobby Flay's Barbecue Addiction (2015)
- Three-time James Beard Foundation Award winner:
  - Rising Star Chef of the Year (1993)
  - National Television Food Show Award – Bobby Flay Chef Mentor (2005)
  - Who's Who of Food & Beverage in America (2007)
- Culinary Hall of Fame Induction (2015)
- Star on Hollywood Walk of Fame (2015)
