= Bobby Flay's Barbecue Addiction =

American cooking show

- Also known as: Barbecue Addiction: Bobby's Basics
- Genre: Cooking show; Food reality television
- Presented by: Bobby Flay
- Country of origin: United States
- Original language: English
- No. of seasons: 4
- No. of episodes: 54

Production
- Producer: Rock Shrimp Productions
- Running time: 22:00

Original release
- Network: Food Network
- Release: June 5, 2011 – September 14, 2014

Bobby Flay's Barbecue Addiction (also known in its fourth and final season as Barbecue Addiction: Bobby's Basics) is an American cooking show that aired on Food Network. Presented by chef Bobby Flay, it showcased recipes based upon different outdoor grilling techniques. The series premiered on June 5, 2011, and concluded on September 14, 2014, after four seasons.

In a May 2011 interview with LA Weekly, Flay contrasted Barbecue Addiction with other cooking shows such as Iron Chef, and noted that each episode has a particular theme. In 2012, Bobby Flay's Barbecue Addiction won a Daytime Emmy Award for Outstanding Culinary Program. In April 2013, Flay's book by the same title was published by Crown Publishing imprint Clarkson Potter.

== Episodes ==
Season	Episodes	Originally released	
Season	Episodes	First released	Last released
1	16	June 5, 2011	November 13, 2011
2	12	June 3, 2012	September 2, 2012
3	13	June 16, 2013	September 15, 2013
4	13	June 22, 2014	September 14, 2014

=== Season 1 (2011) ===
No. overall	No. in season	Title	Original release date
1	1	"California Coasting on the Grill"	July 31, 2011
Santa Maria-Style BBQ Tri-Tip; Grilled Artichokes with Green Goddess Dressing; California White Peach and Sparkling Wine Cocktail (aka Bellini); Grilled White California Peaches with Almond-Mint Pesto
2	2	"Barbe-Cucina"	August 21, 2011
Tuscan Rosemary-Smoked Whole Chickens; Tuscan Wood-Grilled Oysters with Crispy Pancetta-Tomato-Basil Mignonette; Sicilian Grilled Pork Loin with Agrodolce Grilled Peaches; Roman Pizza Bianca
3	3	"Greek Barbecue ... Opa!"	June 19, 2011
Grilled Fingerling Potato Salad with Feta, Green Beans and Olives; Gyros with Radish Tzatziki; Charcoal Grilled Shrimp and Calamari with Grilled Lemons and Smoked Tomato-Black Olive Relish
4	4	"Don't Mess with Texas BBQ"	July 3, 2011
Smoked, Spice Rubbed, Texas-Style Brisket on Texas Toast; Texas-Style Potato Salad with Mustard and Pickled Red Onions; Pinto Beans with Burnt Ends; Rotisserie Chicken with Black Pepper Vinegar Sauce; Grilled Corn with Maple and Chipotle; Pinto Beans with Burnt Ends
5	5	"New England Barbecue Extreme"	July 24, 2011
Hot Smoked Swordfish with White Clam-Garlic-Parsley Sauce; Grilled Sea Scallop Skewers with Creamy Hot Pepper and Garlic Vinaigrette with Toasted Breadcrumbs; Grilled Oysters with Fra Diavolo Sauce; Grilled Lobster Sandwich with Charred Corn and Avocado Salsa
6	6	"Pacific Northwest Fresh off the Grill"	June 5, 2011
Dungeness Crabs Steamed on the Grill in Ginger, Lime, Mirin and Soy; Hot Smoked Salmon with Salad of Apples, Dried Cherries, Hazelnuts and Greens and Apple Cider Vinaigrette; Cedar Planked Burgers
7	7	"Beer, Brats and Barbecue"	September 4, 2011
Beer-Simmered Bratwurst; Smoked Cheese and Beer Fondue with Beer-Simmered Bratwurst, Grilled Bacon, Mushrooms and Rye Bread; Smoked Trout Salad with Grilled Fingerlings Potatoes and Mustard-Dill Vinaigrette; Sauerkraut-Style Grilled Radicchio and Kale
8	8	"Giving Thanks for Barbecue"	November 13, 2011
Cajun Brined Turkey-Two Ways; Eggplant Casserole with Red Pepper Pesto and Cajun Breadcrumbs; Grilled Potatoes with Crabmeat-Green Onion Dressing; Grilled Crawfish with Spicy Tarragon Butter
9	9	"Japanese Grillin'"	August 14, 2011
Seared Tuna, Yellowtail and Salmon with Three Dipping Sauces; Asian Spice Rubbed Ribs with Pineapple-Ginger BBQ Sauce and Black and White Sesame Seeds; Miso Glazed Grilled Japanese Eggplant; Chicken Yakitori
10	10	"Cuba on the Q"	June 26, 2011
Tirado de Mahi Mahi; Cuban Pulled Pork Tacos with Guava Glaze, Sour Orange Red Cabbage-Jicama Slaw and Chipotle Mayonnaise; Cuban Skirt Steak with Tomato Escabeche and Mango Steak Sauce
11	11	"Argentina on the Grill"	July 17, 2011
Grilled Skirt Steak with Green and Smokey Red Chimichurri; Grilled Potato Wedges with Smoked Paprika Mayonnaise Dressing; Pisco Sour Sangria; Tomato, Red Onion and Rocket Salad with Fried Egg, Grilled Chorizo and Grilled Provoleto Crostini
12	12	"Spanish Barbecue Fiesta"	July 10, 2011
Paella on the Grill; Grilled Rack of Pork with Sherry Vinegar BBQ Sauce; Grilled Peaches with Wine Syrup Two Ways
13	13	"Smoky and Spicy Indian Barbecue"	September 18, 2011
Cucumber Raita; Smoked Ginger Chicken with Cardamom, Cloves and Cinnamon; Grilled Cherry Tomato Chutney; Grilled Shrimp Skewers with Cilantro-Mint Chutney; Grilled Halibut with Corn-Coconut Curry Sauce and Grilled Cherry Tomato Chutney
14	14	"South of the Border Barbecue"	September 11, 2011
Slow Smoked Pork Shoulder with Napa Cabbage Slaw and Queso Fresco; Bobby's Margarita; Tamarind Glazed Duck Tacos with Grilled Pineapple Relish and Pickled Onions; Whole Snapper with Grilled Vera Cruz Salsa
15	15	"Middle Eastern Supreme Barbecue"	August 7, 2011
Apricot Glazed Lamb Chops with Pistachio and Sumac; Grilled Bread Salad with Peppers and Tomatoes; Sea Scallops with Cracked Wheat Salad, Roasted Red Pepper Tahini Vinaigrette and Grilled Lemons; Tuna Kofte with Pomegranate Molasses-Mint Glaze with Crushed Spicy Hummus
16	16	"Wine & Dine Barbecue"	June 12, 2011
Grilled Chicken Salad with Apricot Glaze, Homemade Mustard Vinaigrette and Grape Salad; Rib Eyes with Goat Cheese, Meyer Lemon-Honey Mustard and Watercress; Flatbread with Fresh Figs, Monterey Jack, Blue Cheese and Red Wine Reduced Vinaigrette

=== Season 2 (2012) ===
No. overall	No. in season	Title	Original release date
17	1	"Tasty Tales from the Grillin' Southwest"	June 3, 2012
Grilled Lobster Tails with Lemon-Red Fresno Butter; Grilled Red Chile Buttermilk Chicken with Spicy Mango Honey Glaze; Coleslaw with Creamy Cumin Vinaigrette; Grilled Oysters with Jalapeno-Herb Mignonette; Lime Ricky Float Margarita
18	2	"Red, White and Blue on the Cue"	June 10, 2012
Smoked Prime Rib with Red Wine Steak Sauce; New York Street Cart Dogs with Onion Sauce and Grilled Red Pepper Relish; Grilled Soft Shell Crab Sandwich with Red Slaw and Yellow Tomatoes; Sweet Cherry Slushy Cups
19	3	"Northern Italian Alfresco Feast"	June 17, 2012
Raspberry Basil Limoncello Cocktail; Bistecca alla Florentine with Balsamic-Rosemary Steak Sauce and Grilled Treviso with Gorgonzola; Spiedini Hoagies with Caprese Relish; Pizza with Shaved Asparagus and Robiola
20	4	"Tempting Taste of the Islands"	June 24, 2012
Coconut Marinated Pork Tenderloin; Smoked Jerk Chicken Wings with Honey-Tamarind Dipping Sauce; Ceviche (Shrimp and Grouper) with Serrano Chiles, Mango, Smoked Tomatoes, Crispy Plantain Chips; Tropical Sangria
21	5	"Summer Grillin' Party"	July 1, 2012
Grilled White Fish with Chermoula; Red Curry Marinated Skirt Steak Fajitas; Cornell Chicken with Grilled Steak Fries; Strawberry Rhubarb Margaritas
22	6	"Grilling With a Spanish Flair"	July 8, 2012
Spanish Spice Rubbed Pork Butt with Sherry Vinegar-Honey Glaze; Spanish "Cuban" Sandwiches; Peach-Blackberry Sangria; Grilled Corn with Piquillo Pepper Butter and Grated Manchego; Skewered Lamb with Spicy Pomegranate-Rioja Red Wine Vinaigrette and Mint-Almond Relish
23	7	"Mezzogiorno, Mangia Bene!"	July 15, 2012
Sgroppino; Brined Butterflied Chicken Alla Diavola with Lemony Fennel Slaw; Grilled Tuna with Caramelized Onions, Cinnamon and Mint; Grilled Eggplant Caponata Bruschetta with Ricotta Salata
24	8	"Greek Week on the Grill"	July 22, 2012
Vodka Grape Sparkler; Grilled Shrimp with Tomato and Feta; Grilled Sardines with Garlic Walnut Sauce; Open-Faced Pitas with Rotisserie Lamb with Pomegranate and Mint, Grilled Tomatoes, and Greek Slaw
25	9	"Backyard Mexican Food Fest"	August 26, 2012
Charcoal Grilled Chicken Sinaloa-Style with Grilled Corn, Black Bean and Quinoa Relish; Grilled Mango with Lime, Salt and Ancho Powder; Oaxaca Burger with Manchego, Avocado and Pickled Habanero Onions; Raspberry Peach Aqua Fresca
26	10	"California – Fresh on the Grill!"	August 5, 2012
Mustard Aioli Grilled Potatoes with Fine Herbs; California Rose Punch; Smoked Salmon Pizza (a la Wolfgang); Grilled Lamb Sausage with Goat Cheese, Heirloom Tomatoes, Olives and Herbs
27	11	"New South: Barbecue and Beyond"	August 12, 2012
Pimiento Cheese-Bacon Burger; Sparkling Bourbon Lemonade; Curry Rubbed Smoked Chicken Thighs with Sorghum-Chile Glaze; Smoked Trout Lettuce Wraps with Meyer Lemon Dressing and Carrots
28	12	"Eastern Intrigue"	September 2, 2012
Spice Rubbed Lamb Chops Hoisin and with Grilled Bok Choy Salad; Orange-Ginger Grilled Boneless Short Ribs with Green Onion-Peanut Relish; Coconut Ice Tea; Pork Shoulder Lettuce Wraps with Kimchi

=== Season 3 (2013) ===
No. overall	No. in season	Title	Original release date
29	1	"Backyard Barbacoa"	June 16, 2013
Coconut Margarita; Grilled Pink Snapper with Caramelized Pineapple-Green Onion Butter and Relish; Smoked Adobo Marinated Brisket Tortas with Horseradish Crema and Caramelized Onion-Tomato Relish; Smoked Adobo Marinated Brisket Tortas with Horseradish Crema and Caramelized Onion-Tomato Relish; Arugula, Avocado, Papaya and Jicama Salad with Pomegranate Dressing and Tortilla Chip Croutons; Coconut Margarita
30	2	"Four Corners 'Cue"	June 23, 2013
Tequila Sangria; Grilled Fish Tacos with Vera Cruz Salsa; Creamed Corn Succotash with Cotija; Spice Rubbed Grilled American Bison Short Ribs with Orange Honey Chipotle BBQ Sauce; Tequila Sangria
31	3	"Northeast Barbecue Feast"	July 14, 2013
Hot Lobster Roll with Lemon-Tarragon Butter; Caramelized Scallops with Fresh Green Pea Vinaigrette; Grilled Swordfish and Eggplant Salad with Honey-Thyme Vinaigrette; Raspberry Gingerale
32	4	"Farm to Flame Summer Barbecue"	July 7, 2013
Maple-Mustard-Mixed Pepper Glazed Salmon with Brussels Sprout Slaw; Grilled Sausages with Grilled Shallot Relish with Fresh Ricotta and Toasted Baguette; Basil Rubbed Halibut with Puttanesca Relish; Layered Smoothies; Basil Rubbed Halibut with Puttanesca Relish
33	5	"Spectacular Spanish Barbecue"	July 21, 2013
Spanish Seafood Salad; Strawberry-Pink Grapefruit Rose Sangria; Fire Roasted Baby Lamb Chops with Smoked Paprika-Orange BBQ Sauce; Grilled Portobello Salad with Hazelnut Pesto
34	6	"Feast From the Middle East"	August 18, 2013
Grilled Quail with Pomegranate-Orange BBQ Sauce and Tabouli with Quinoa and Shredded Kale; Honey Glazed Grilled Fig Salad with Feta, Pistachio and Mizuna; Ras El Hanout Marinated Lamb Shawarma with Red Pepper-Walnut Tahini Sauce; Apricot-Mint Sours
35	7	"Tropical Barbecue"	September 8, 2013
Grilled Hassleback Sweet Potatoes with Molasses-Nutmeg Butter; Radicchio-Green Mango Slaw; Grilled Jerk Rack of Pork; Dark and Stormy
36	8	"Delizioso Grilling"	June 30, 2013
Espresso Soda; Panzanella Verde; Grilled Baby Artichokes with Mixed Herbs Vinaigrette; Fennel-Garlic Smoked Pork with Fennel Gremolata and Grape Mostarda
37	9	"Moroccan Grill Magic"	August 4, 2013
Middle Eastern Lemonade; Grilled Chicken Couscous with Apricots and Pistachio; Curry Hummus Flat Bread with Tomato Chutney; Lamb Loin with Spicy Date Glaze
38	10	"Southern Style Barbecue"	August 11, 2013
BBQ Ribs with Root Beer BBQ Sauce; Grilled Shrimp with Bacon, Tomato and Scallion Vinaigrette; Smoked Sausage with BBQ Remoulade and Green Tomato Chowchow Relish; Mississippi Mud Pie Spiked Milkshake Shots
39	11	"Grills Gone Wild"	July 28, 2013
Korean Pulled Pork Sandwich with Asian Slaw; Grilled Tuscan Tuna Salad; Curried Lobster Rolls; Watermelon-Mint Iced Tea (Greek Inspired)
40	12	"Barbecue Block Party"	September 1, 2013
Long Island Iced Tea; Filet Mignon with Honey-Dijon Vinaigrette, Lavender Fine Herb Goat Cheese and Butter Lettuce; Heirloom Tomato and Grilled Corn Panzanella with Salmon; Caja China-Roasted "Peking" "Pekin" Pulled Duck Sliders with BBQ Creme Fraiche and Pickled Grilled Green Onions
41	13	"Fresh and Fit Grilling"	September 15, 2013
Grilled Tuna with Grilled Ratatouille Couscous and Deconstructed Pesto; Grilled Trout Almondine with Radicchio and Orange-Almond Vinaigrette; Peach and Tomato Salad with Sweet Southern Dressing, Pecans and Farmer's Cheese; Arugula, Avocado, Papaya and Jicama Salad with Pomegranate Dressing and Tortilla Chip Croutons; White Peach Iced Tea; Grilled Trout Almondine with Radicchio and Orange-Almond Vinaigrette

=== Season 4 (2014) ===
No. overall	No. in season	Title	Original release date
42	1	"Bobby's Basics: Burgers, Fries and Shakes"	August 17, 2014
Russian Dressing Slaw; Grilled Sweet Potato Fries with Honey-Mustard-Mint Dipping Sauce; Classic Burgers with Cheese, Chipotle Ketchup, Horseradish Mustard and Russian Dressing Slaw; Brown Butter Peach Cobbler Milkshakes
43	2	"Bobby's Basics: Simply Skewers"	June 29, 2014
Grilled Shrimp Skewers; Watermelon-Strawberry Sangria; Greek Orzo Salad with Mustard-Dill Vinaigrette; Grilled Zucchini Skewers with Jalapeno Yogurt Dipping Sauce
44	3	"Bobby's Basics: Steakhouse at Home"	June 22, 2014
Grilled Rib-Eye Steak with Brown Butter and Blue Cheese; Grilled Potatoes with Mustard-Garlic Dressing; Grilled Broccoli Rabe with Grilled Pepper Relish; Grape Sparkler Cocktail
45	4	"Bobby's Basics: Fish Taco Fiesta"	August 3, 2014
Grilled Fish Tacos with Avocado Relish, Smoky Tomato-Greek Yogurt Crema and Red Cabbage-Citrus Slaw; Bobby's Rub for Fish; Red Cabbage-Citrus Slaw; Avocado Relish with Cilantro Pesto; Smoky Tomato-Greek Yogurt Crema; Sparkling Layered Aguas Frescas
46	5	"Bobby's Basics: Go-To Grilling"	July 6, 2014
Pressed Chicken with Salsa Verde; Grilled Potato Salad with Arugula, Goat Cheese and Lemon-Mustard-Tarragon Vinaigrette; Lemon-Mustard-Tarragon Vinaigrette; Crostini with Grilled Asparagus and Green Peppercorn-Tarragon Vinaigrette; Grapefruit Granita-sicle
47	6	"Bobby's Basics: Sizzling Sausages"	August 31, 2014
Beer Glazed Grilled Bratwurst with Wilted Red Cabbage Slaw; Grilled NY Style Sausages with Balsamic Onion Sauce and Grilled Tomatoes; Balsamic Onion Sauce; Hibiscus Fizz Cocktail
48	7	"Bobby's Basics: Farmers' Market Feast"	August 10, 2014
Sticky Glazed Chicken Thighs in Butter Lettuce; Corn and Scallion Salad with Cilantro-Mint Dressing; Mojitea; Grilled Peaches with Arugula Pesto and Prosciutto
49	8	"Bobby's Basics: Bold Flavor Barbecue"	August 24, 2014
Tropical Slaw with Sweet & Sour Dressing; Grilled Smashed Potatoes with Toasted Cumin Vinaigrette; Jerk-Rubbed Beef Tenderloin; Agua de Jamaica
50	9	"Bobby's Basics: New Grilling Classics"	July 13, 2014
Ratatouille Panzanella Salad with Herb-Parmesan Dressing; Grilled Halibut with Brown Butter-Citrus-au Poivre Vinaigrette; Haricots Verts with Almonds, Ricotta Salata and Orange-Honey Dressing; Blackberry Shooters
51	10	"Bobby's Basics: Backyard Mediterranean"	September 7, 2014
Carrot Slaw; Grilled Eggplant Dip; Simply Grilled Basil-Rubbed Swordfish with Tomato-Green Olive Relish; Grilled Corn on the Cob with Garlic Whip, Dill and Feta Cheese; Rose Wine with Frozen Fruit Cubes
52	11	"Bobby's Basics: Veggie Delight"	July 27, 2014
Portobello "Pizza" Nicoise; Strawberry-Rhubarb Greek Yogurt Fool; Vodka and Orange; White Chicory Salad with Apricot Dressing and Grilled Whole Wheat Pita Croutons
53	12	"Bobby's Basics: Quick and Easy Southern Grilling"	September 14, 2014
Bobby's Spice Rub for Beef and Pork; Grilled Sweet Potato Wedges with Orange-Molasses Butter; Sweet & Sour Black-Eyed Pea Succotash; Spice-Rubbed Pork Chops with Sorghum BBQ Sauce; Peach-Ginger Julep
54	13	"Bobby's Basics: Grilled Taco Party"	July 20, 2014
Bobby's Rub for Beef and Pork; Grilled Portobello and Rajas Salsa Taco with Queso Fresco; Brazilian Limeade; Apricot-Smoked Chile Glaze Lamb Tacos with Tomato-Cucumber Salsa; Kale Slaw with Lime and Cotija
