= Camille St. Cyr =

American film producer

Camille St. Cyr (born January 25, 1975) is an American television and film casting director.

== Casting director credits ==
- The Young and the Restless (October 7, 2008–present; hired by Paul Rauch)
- Blue Blood (TV Movie, 2008)
- NCIS (TV series, 2003–2007)
- Drive (TV series, 2007)
- The Dresden Files (TV series, 2007)
- Fort Pit (TV movie, 2007)
- The Half Life of Timofey Berezin (TV movie, 2006)
- A Little Thing Called Murder (TV movie, 2006)
- JAG (TV series, 2003–2005)
- PU-239 (Movie, 2005)
- Mermaid (TV movie, 2005)

== Casting department/associate credits ==
- Vegas Dick (TV movie, 2003)
- Vampire: Los Muertos (Movie, 2002)
- Dead Above Ground (Movie, 2002)
- Providence (TV series, 2001–2002)
- Max Keeble's Big Move (Movie, 2001)
- Strong Medicine (TV series, 2000)
- The X-Files (TV series, 1998)
- Sabrina the Teenage Witch (TV series, 1998)
- Port Charles (TV series, 1997–1998)
- General Hospital (TV series, 1997–1998) (hired by Wendy Riche)
