= Zero Point Zero Production =

American digital media company

Zero Point Zero Production, Inc.
- Type: Private
- Industry: Entertainment
- Founded: 2003
- Headquarters: New York City, United States
- Key people: Chris Collins; Lydia Tenaglia
- Products: Television; Film; Print; Digital
- Website: zeropointzero.com

Zero Point Zero Production, Inc. (a.k.a. Zero Point Zero; commonly abbreviated as ZPZ) is a television, film, print, and digital content company founded in 2003 by Executive Producers Chris Collins and Lydia Tenaglia. Since its inception, the company has produced hundreds of hours of documentary content in over 100 countries around the world, including the critically acclaimed, Emmy and Peabody Award-winning series Anthony Bourdain: Parts Unknown, the Emmy Award-winning The Mind of a Chef, and Emmy nominated The Hunt with John Walsh. As of 2019, ZPZ has received 27 Emmy Awards with 80 Nominations, A Peabody Award, 2 PGA Awards, 5 ACE Eddie Awards, and 5 James Beard Awards. The company also publishes Food Republic.

== Television ==
Year	Title	Network	Description
2000 – 2003	A Cook's Tour	Food Network	A docu-series exploring food, culture and lifestyle through the bleary eyes of New York City cook, Anthony Bourdain.
2004 – 2012	Anthony Bourdain: No Reservations	Travel Channel	A travel series that follows best-selling author, culinary adventurer & hedonist Anthony Bourdain (Kitchen Confidential, A Cook's Tour, Medium Raw etc.) around the world on a quest to explore culture through food.
2005	Decoding Ferran Adria	Travel Channel / Discovery International	A critically acclaimed documentary that gives an in depth look at the world of this Spanish culinary genius.
2005 – 2010	Gourmet's Diary of a Foodie	WGBH / Discovery Channel / National Geographic Channel	A sophisticated travel/food series for people who experience the world “food first.”
2006	Project Jay	Bravo	A docu-special that follows Jay McCarroll, the original winner of Project Runway as he tries to take the next steps in his design career.
2007	Eleven Minutes	Theatrical Release	A critically acclaimed documentary that follows Jay McCarroll, the original winner of Project Runway as he tries to establish himself as a legitimate designer and launch a new line.
2009	Eating Outloud with Ruth Reichl	Food Network	A sophisticated travel/food series with celebrated author and food critic Ruth Reichl who travels the world to uncover the best cooking schools on five continents and brings along a host of her foodie and actor friends to sharpen their skills.
2009	Johnny Colt: At Full Volume	Travel Channel	Travel series by Johnny Colt in Thailand.
2010	Brew Masters	Discovery Channel	A docu-business following maverick Craft brewing Sam Calagione of Dogfish Head Brewery, who travels far and wide for inspiration for new brews while dealing with the trials of running a successful small business in America.
2011	Dance the World	Travel Channel	A docu-special that follows classically trained dancer Jaycee Gossett to Brazil, where she attempts to learn to samba in time to participate in Carnival.
2011	The Wild Within	Travel Channel	An adventure travel series following author/outdoorsman Steven Rinella around the world on his quest to explore the ancestral human pursuit of hunting and gathering in the wild.
2011 – 2013	The Layover	Travel Channel	A high-octane travel series that follows Anthony Bourdain to cities around the world as he gives you the inside skinny on where to eat, drink, and what to experience on a 24-hour layover.
2011 – 2022	MeatEater	Sportsman Channel / Netflix	Take a walk on the wild side with author/hunter/outdoorsman Steven Rinella as cliffs, claws, and the culinary arts come crashing together on a nail-biting outdoor adventure.
2012	Extra Virgin	Cooking Channel	Actress Debi Mazar and her Italian husband Gabriele Corcos invite the viewer inside their home as they share their tremendous passion for Tuscan cuisine and each other in thirteen half-hour episodes.
2012	Hawaii Air Rescue	The Weather Channel	A 6-part docu-business following the crew of Hawaii Life Flight, the only air ambulance service on the Hawaiian Islands, whose race against time and the elements saves lives every day.
2012	Married with Dishes	Cooking Channel	A special documenting Queens, NY-based chef Tamara Reynolds and her husband Karl as they take their deliciously homegrown Sunday Night Dinners on the road.
2012	Meat Men	Food Network	Pat LaFrieda runs a renowned meat empire with his cranky dad, Pat Sr., and his smooth-talking cousin, Mark Pastore. This docu-business series goes behind the scenes of their family-run business for a high-"steaks" ride with a side of humor, served medium rare.
2012 – 2017	The Mind of a Chef	PBS / Facebook Watch	The Emmy and James Beard Award-winning series that consistently and fearlessly breaks down the barriers between a chef and their creative process, having a ton of fun along the way.
2013 – 2018	Anthony Bourdain: Parts Unknown	CNN	Author and veteran traveler, Anthony Bourdain, tackles new and more challenging locations as he explores every corner of the globe, seeks out memorable personalities and the places that help define the international cultural landscape. As always, the food is only the first glimpse of a wider view of how people live their lives in faraway lands and unfamiliar territories.
2013 – 2014	The Getaway	Esquire Network	A gritty, insiders travel series where multiple celebrities, all with a unique perspective on a particular location, unleash an unpredictable story about a place, its people, and their culture in only 36 to 48 hours.
2014 – 2017	The Hunt With John Walsh	CNN	John Walsh, the iconic soldier for justice known from his years on America's Most Wanted, returns to take up the torch for the capture of America's, and the world's, most critical fugitives. Using a compelling new storytelling approach and a deep understanding of the criminal world, Walsh sounds the call with a powerful and urgent voice.
2015 – Present	Apex Predator	Sportsman Channel	Audiences join Remi Warren on a quest to become a better hunter through learning directly from nature. Along the way, he meets with experts and professionals to learn about animals and their adaptations, designs tests and trials to emulate primal hunting tactics, and challenges himself to grueling and intense hunts-animal style.
2015	I'll Have What Phil's Having	PBS	A one-hour travel series that follows Philip Rosenthal, the award-winning creator of Everybody Loves Raymond, around the United States as he eats his way through his fear of new things.
2018 – Present	Somebody Feed Phil	Netflix	A one-hour travel series that follows Phil Rosenthal, the award-winning creator of Everybody Loves Raymond, around the globe as he eats his way through all the great food cultures.
2018 – 2019	Rotten	Netflix	Local farming is fading as profit margins decide what food makes it to our plates. The Netflix Original documentary series Rotten exposes the fraud, corruption, and the consequences on our health of today's global food industry. Nobody's hands are clean.
2018 – Present	Christiane Amanpour:Sex and Love Around The World	CNN	An immersive, 6 part documentary series hosted by Christiane Amanpour that takes viewers into the bedrooms and minds of women and men to explore how love, intimacy and relationships are changing in an increasingly complex and tangled world.
2019	Elvis Goes There	Epix	Elvis Mitchell hits the road next for a new Epix docuseries. Elvis Goes There features the veteran journalist traveling with A-list filmmakers and actors to places of inspiration around the world, exploring how each location shaped their work and identity.
2018 – Present	In Pursuit with John Walsh	Investigation Discovery	Investigation Discovery and John Walsh track down the nations most wanted criminals in the real-time investigation series.
2018 – Present	My Next Guest Needs No Introduction with David Letterman	Netflix	The series consists of interviews by David Letterman with one guest per episode both inside and outside a studio setting.
2019	Broken	Netflix	
2020	Pandemic: How to Prevent an Outbreak	Netflix	The documentary series is about why the world is not ready for a new pandemic and the many stories of medical professionals telling you why.

== Film ==
Year	Title	Description
2016	Jeremiah Tower: The Last Magnificent	A biography of Jeremiah Tower, celebrated chef of Chez Panisse and Stars restaurants. Directed by Lydia Tenaglia and executive produced by Anthony Bourdain
2017	Wasted! The Story Of Food Waste	A documentary collaboration of The Rockefeller Foundation, Zero Point Zero Films and Anthony Bourdain. Starring Bourdain, Dan Barber, Mario Batali, Massimo Bottura, and Danny Bowien, it demonstrates maximizing use of ingredients, transforming scraps and rejects into dishes to create a sustainable food system. The film also features several food waste reduction stories, including pigs farming in Japan, a disposal program in South Korea, and garden education in New Orleans.
2017	Fermented	Chefs Edward Lee, Stuart Brioza, Dominique Crenn and Chad Robertson, and brewers Nick Floyd and Sandor Katz explore fermentation in modern cooking.
2018	Stars In The Sky	This documentary is an examination of the lives and minds of hunters in America that opens the door to an honest exploration of the controversies, emotions, and traditions that are inherent to this most primal human activity.
2024	Wild Wild Space	Explores the quests of three space programs, Astra Space, Rocket Lab, and Planet Labs.

== Awards and nominations ==
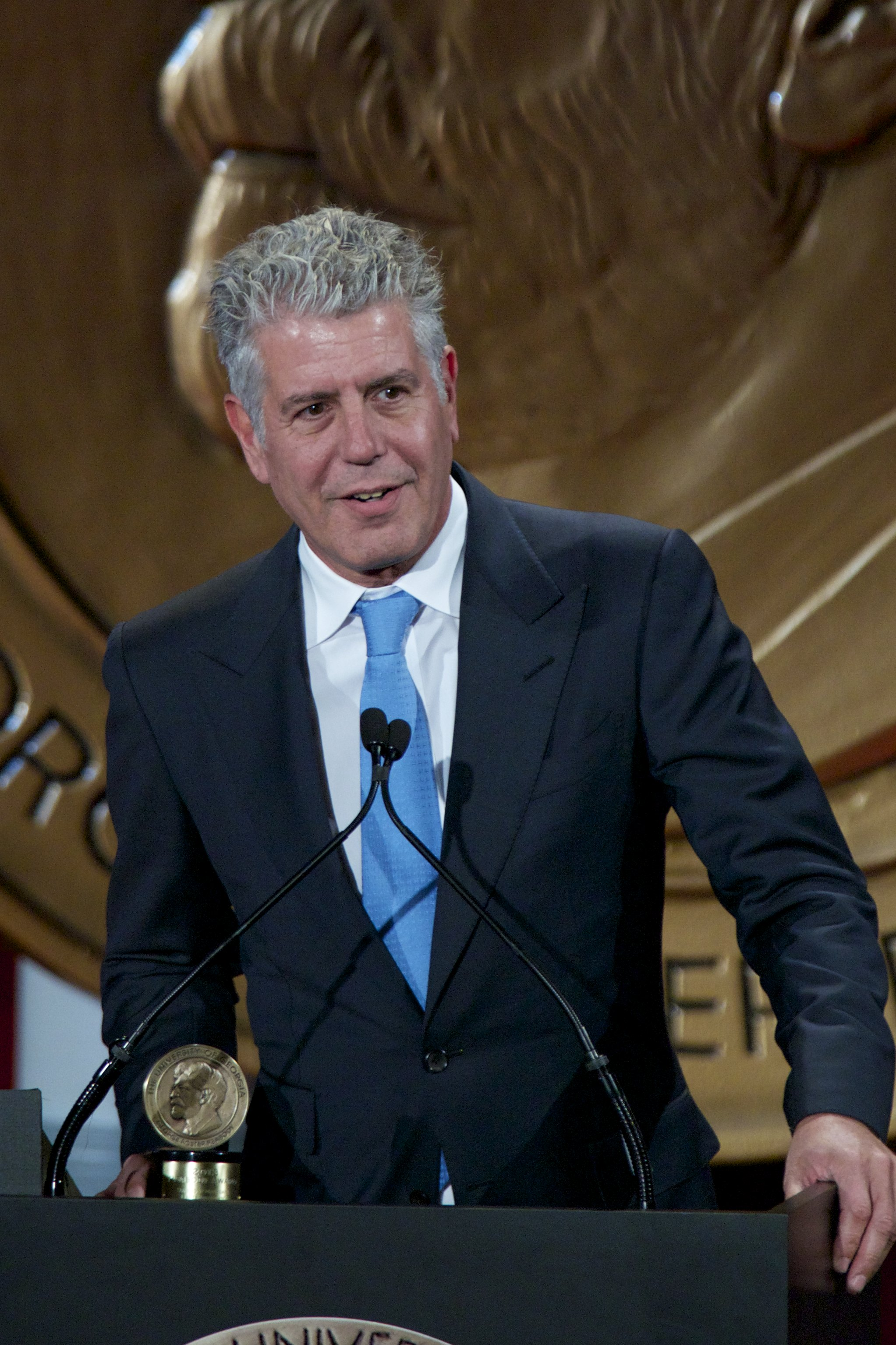
Anthony Bourdain at the 73rd Annual Peabody Awards

- 2007 CINE Golden Eagle Award Winner, Best Lifestyle Series (Gourmet's Diary of a Foodie)
- 2007 BANFF Award Winner, Best Lifestyle Series (Gourmet's Diary of a Foodie)
- 2008 James Beard Award Winner, Best Food Television Series (Gourmet's Diary of a Foodie)
- 2008 CINE Golden Eagle Award Winner, Best Lifestyle Series (Gourmet's Diary of a Foodie)
- 2008 Silver Medal at New York Festivals Television Broadcasting Awards, Best Editing [Documentary/Info] (Gourmet's Diary of a Foodie)
- 2009 Silver Telly Award Winner, Editing and Cinematography (Gourmet's Adventures with Ruth)
- 2009 Daytime Emmy Winner, Outstanding Single Camera Editing (Gourmet's Diary of a Foodie)
- 2009 Emmy Winner, Outstanding Cinematography for Nonfiction Programming (Anthony Bourdain: No Reservations: Laos)
- 2009 Silver Medal at New York Festivals International TV Programming & Promotion Awards, Travel & Tourism (Gourmet's Diary of a Foodie)
- 2011 Northern Lights Award Winner, Broadcast Award (The Layover)
- 2011 Emmy Winner, Outstanding Cinematography for Nonfiction Programming (Anthony Bourdain: No Reservations: Haiti)
- 2011 CLIO Award Winner (Anthony Bourdain: No Reservations)
- 2011 ACE Eddie Award Winner, Best Edited Reality Series (Anthony Bourdain: No Reservations)
- 2012 Critics' Choice Award, Best Reality Series (Anthony Bourdain: No Reservations)
- 2013 James Beard Award Winner, Television Program, On Location ("The Mind of a Chef")
- 2013 Emmy Winner, Outstanding Cinematography for Nonfiction Programming ("Anthony Bourdain: Parts Unknown: Myanmar")
- 2013 Emmy Winner, Outstanding Informational Series or Special ("Anthony Bourdain: Parts Unknown)
- 2014 Daytime Emmy Winner, Outstanding Culinary Program ("The Mind of a Chef")
- 2014 Emmy Winner, Outstanding Informational Series or Special ("Anthony Bourdain: Parts Unknown")
- 2015 Daytime Emmy Winner, Outstanding Main Title and Graphic Design ("The Mind of a Chef")
- 2015 Daytime Emmy Winner, Outstanding Single Camera Photography ("The Mind of a Chef")
- 2015 Daytime Emmy Winner, Outstanding Single Camera Editing ("The Mind of a Chef")
- 2015 Emmy Winner, Outstanding Informational Series or Special ("Anthony Bourdain: Parts Unknown")
- 2016 Daytime Emmy Winner, Outstanding Main Title and Graphic Design ("The Mind of a Chef")
- 2016 Daytime Emmy Winner, Outstanding Directing in a Lifestyle/Culinary/Travel Program ("The Mind of a Chef")
- 2016 Daytime Emmy Winner, Outstanding Cinematography ("The Mind of a Chef")
- 2016 Daytime Emmy Winner, Outstanding Individual in Animation - production designer ("The Mind of a Chef")
- 2016 Daytime Emmy Winner, Outstanding Culinary Host - Gabrielle Hamilton and David Kinch ("The Mind of a Chef")
- 2016 Emmy Winner, Outstanding Informational Series or Special ("Anthony Bourdain: Parts Unknown")
- 2017 Daytime Emmy Winner, Outstanding Main Title and Graphic Design ("The Mind of a Chef")
- 2017 Daytime Emmy Winner, Outstanding Sound Mixing - Live Action ("The Mind of a Chef")
