= Daytime Emmy Award for Outstanding Single Camera Editing =

American TV award for editing daytime television

The Daytime Emmy Award for Outstanding Single Camera Editing is an Emmy award given for editing in daytime television.

== Winners and Nominees ==
Winners in bold

=== Outstanding Achievement in Single Camera Editing ===
==== 1990s ====
1992

- **Square One TV** (PBS)
  - This Old House (PBS)
  - Reading Rainbow (PBS)

1993

- **ABC Afterschool Special** ("Shades of a Single Protein") (ABC)
  - The Oprah Winfrey Show (SYN)
  - CBS Schoolbreak Special ("Please God, I'm Only 17") (CBS)
  - Reading Rainbow (PBS)
  - ABC Afterschool Special ("Surviving a Break-Up") (ABC)

1994

- **ABC Afterschool Special** ("Girlfriend") (ABC)
  - Dog City (FOX)
  - Beakman’s World (CBS)
  - The Addams Family (ABC)
  - This Old House (PBS)

1995

- **Beakman's World** (CBS)
  - Reading Rainbow (PBS)
  - Bill Nye the Science Guy (SYN)
  - This Old House (PBS)
  - Dog City (FOX)

1996

- **ABC Afterschool Special** ("Positive: A Journey Into AIDS") (ABC)
  - Beakman's World (CBS)
  - This Old House (PBS)
  - Reading Rainbow (PBS)
  - Bill Nye the Science Guy (SYN)

1997

- **Bill Nye the Science Guy** (SYN)
  - Beakman's World (CBS)
  - Bob Vila's Home Again (SYN)
  - This Old House (PBS)
  - Reading Rainbow (PBS)

1998

- **Bill Nye the Science Guy** (SYN)
  - Beakman's World (CBS)
  - Reading Rainbow (PBS)
  - This Old House (PBS)
  - Wishbone (PBS)

1999

- **Bill Nye the Science Guy** (SYN)
  - The Inventors’ Specials ("Edison: The Wizard of Light") (HBO)
  - The New Yankee Workshop (PBS)
  - Reading Rainbow (PBS)
  - This Old House (PBS)

==== 2000s ====
2000

- **The Artists’ Specials** ("Mary Cassatt: American Impressionist") (HBO)
  - Behind the Screen with John Burke (AMC)
  - Bill Nye the Science Guy (SYN)
  - Nick News with Linda Ellerbee (SYN)
  - This Old House (PBS)

2001

- **Between the Lions** (PBS)
  - Reading Rainbow (PBS)
  - Natureworks (PBS)
  - This Old House (PBS)
  - Zoboomafoo (PBS)

2002

- **V.I.P.** (Syn)
  - Reading Rainbow (PBS)
  - Between the Lions (PBS)
  - This Old House (PBS)
  - Trading Spaces (TLC)
  - ZOOM (PBS)

2003

- **Reading Rainbow** (PBS)
- **A Wedding Story** (TLC)
  - Between the Lions (PBS)
  - This Old House (PBS)
  - While You Were Out (TLC)

2004

- **Britney: In the Zone & Out All Night** (MTV)
  - Ask This Old House (PBS)
  - Between the Lions (PBS)
  - Dr. Phil (SYN)
  - Great Hotels (Travel)
  - ZOOM (PBS)

2005

- **Reading Rainbow** (PBS)
  - Bob Vila's Home Again (SYN)
  - Dr. Phil (SYN)
  - The View (ABC)
  - ZOOM (PBS)

2006

- **Starting Over** (SYN)
  - Dr. Phil (SYN)
  - Inside This Old House (A&E)
  - The View (ABC)

2007

- **Starting Over** (SYN)
  - This Old House (PBS)
  - Sell This House (A&E)
  - Between the Lions (PBS)
  - The View (ABC)
  - Everyday Italian (Food Network)

2008

- **DragonflyTV** (PBS)
  - FETCH! with Ruff Ruffman (PBS)
  - Gourmet's Diary of a Foodie (PBS)
  - Ur Life Online (A&E)
  - Samantha Brown: Passport to Latin America (Travel)

2009

- **Gourmet's Diary of a Foodie** (PBS)
  - Art Attack with Lee Sandstead (Travel)
  - Biz Kid$ (PBS)
  - DragonflyTV (PBS)
  - Made in America (Travel)

==== 2010s ====
2010

- **The Electric Company** (PBS)
  - The Relic Hunter with Ian Grant (Travel)
  - Design Squad (PBS)
  - Biz Kid$ (PBS)

2011

- **The Electric Company** (PBS)
  - FETCH! with Ruff Ruffman (PBS)
  - NASA 360 (NASA Television)
  - SciGirls (PBS)

2012

- **The Electric Company** (PBS)
  - Biz Kid$ (PBS)
  - R.L. Stine's The Haunting Hour (Hub)
  - Surf's Up For Dogs: The Making of the World's Longest and Heaviest Float (SYN)

2013

- **Biz Kid$** (PBS)
  - R.L. Stine's The Haunting Hour (Hub)
  - SciGirls (PBS)

2014

- **Giada in Paradise** (Cooking Channel)
  - Made in Israel (ABC Family)
  - The Mind of a Chef (PBS)
  - This Old House (PBS)

2015

- **The Mind of a Chef** (PBS)
  - The Henry Ford’s Innovation Nation (CBS)
  - Got Your 6 (MTV)
  - Odd Squad (PBS)

2016

- **Giada in Italy** (Food Network)
  - Annedroids (Amazon)
  - Ocean Mysteries with Jeff Corwin (SYN)
  - R.L. Stine's Monsterville: Cabinet of Souls (Netflix)
  - The Inspectors (CBS)

2017

- **Eat the World with Emeril Lagasse** (Amazon)
  - The Henry Ford's Innovation Nation (CBS)
  - The Mind of a Chef (PBS)
  - Odd Squad (PBS)
  - Weird But True! (Nat Geo)

2018

- **Giada In Italy** (Food Network)
  - 1st Look (NBC)
  - Cop and a Half: New Recruit (Netflix)
  - Free Rein (Netflix)
  - Scars of Nanking (A&E)
