= Nomad with Carlton McCoy =

American travel and food reality television series

- Genre: Reality
- Presented by: Carlton McCoy
- Country of origin: United States
- Original language: English

Production
- Production company: Zero Point Zero Production

Original release
- Network: CNN
- Release: May 1, 2022 – present

Nomad with Carlton McCoy is an American travel and food reality television series. The series stars master sommelier and CEO of Heitz Cellar Carlton McCoy seeking authentic culture and off-the-beaten-path finds in various destinations around the world. The series began airing on May 1, 2022, on CNN.

== Episodes ==
No. overall	No. in season	Title	Directed by	Original release date
1	1	"Paris Suburbs"	Gillian Brown	May 1, 2021
2	2	"South Korea"	Unknown	May 8, 2021
3	3	"Washington, DC"	Unknown	May 15, 2021
4	4	"Ghana"	Unknown	May 22, 2021
5	5	"Toronto"	Unknown	May 29, 2021
6	6	"Mississippi"	Unknown	May 29, 2021

== Production ==
In May 2021, Nomad with Carlton McCoy from Zero Point Zero Production was announced as part of CNN's then upcoming slate. It was revealed in a press release at the beginning of 2022 that it would premiere that year. It was originally planned for a March release before being moved to May.
