= Daytime Emmy Award for Outstanding Cinematography =

American TV production award

The Daytime Emmy Award for Outstanding Cinematography is given by the National Academy of Television Arts and Sciences in the US for single-camera work in daytime television. The Daytime Emmy Awards are among the more prominent categories of Emmy Award.

== Winners and Nominees ==
Winners in bold

=== Outstanding Individual Achievement in Religious Programming ===
==== 1970s ====
1976

- **A Determining Force** (NBC)

1978

- **Continuing Creation** (NBC)

1979

- **This Other Eden** (NBC)

=== Outstanding Individual Achievement in Children's Programming ===
==== 1970s ====
1978

- **NBC Special Treat** ("Five Finger Discount") (NBC)

1979

- **The Big Blue Marble** (SYN)
- **The Big Blue Marble** (SYN)
- **NBC Special Treat** ("Rodeo Red and the Runaway") (NBC)

==== 1980s ====
1980

- **ABC Afterschool Special** ("A Movie Star's Daughter") (ABC)
- **ABC Weekend Special** ("The Gold Bug") (ABC)
- **CBS Library** ("Once Upon a Midnight Dreary") (CBS)
- **Sesame Street** (PBS)
  - 3-2-1 Contact ("Mountain Climbing" and "Hot/Cold") (PBS)

=== Special Classification - Individual Achievement ===
==== 1980s ====
1980

- The Big Blue Marble ("Witch's Sister: Chapter 2") (SYN)

=== Outstanding Individual Achievement in Religious Programming - Cinematographer ===
==== 1980s ====
1981

- Work and Worship: The Legacy of St. Benedict (NBC)

=== Outstanding Achievement in Any Area of Creative Technical Crafts - Cinematography ===
==== 1980s ====
1982

- The Body Human (The Loving Process: Men) (CBS)

1983

- **New Wilderness** (SYN)

=== Outstanding Cinematography in Children's Programming ===
==== 1980s ====
1981

- **The Big Blue Marble** (SYN)
- **The Big Blue Marble** ("New Jersey/Egypt") (SYN)
- **The Body Human** ("Facts for Boys") (CBS)
  - ABC Afterschool Special ("Stoned") (ABC)
  - Mandy's Grandmother (SYN)

1982

- **The Big Blue Marble** ("Horsemen of Inner Mongolia") (SYN)
  - ABC Afterschool Special ("Daddy, I'm Their Mama Now") (ABC)
  - The Body Human ("Becoming a Woman") (CBS)

1983

- **CBS Afternoon Playhouse** ("The Shooting") (CBS)
  - CBS Library ("Robbers, Rooftops and Witches") (CBS)

1984

- **ABC Afterschool Special** ("Andrea's Story: A Hitchhiking Tragedy") (ABC)
  - ABC Afterschool Special ("The Hand Me Down Kid") (ABC)
  - ABC Weekend Special ("Cougar") (ABC)

=== Outstanding Cinematography ===
==== 1980s ====
1985

- **ABC Afterschool Special** ("Out of Step") (ABC)
  - Kidsworld (ABC)
  - ABC Afterschool Special ("Backwards: The Riddle of Dyslexia") (ABC)

1986

- **CBS Schoolbreak Special** ("The War Between The Classes") (CBS)
  - 3-2-1 Contact (PBS)
  - ABC Afterschool Special ("Are You My Mother?") (ABC)
  - ABC Afterschool Special ("Don't Touch") (ABC)
  - ABC Weekend Special ("Pippi Longstocking") (ABC)
  - CBS Schoolbreak Special ("Have You Tried Talking to Patty?") (CBS)
  - CBS Schoolbreak Special ("Babies Having Babies") (CBS)

1987

- **3-2-1 Contact** (PBS)
  - ABC Afterschool Special ("Teen Father") (ABC)
  - CBS Schoolbreak Special ("God, the Universe & Hot Fudge Sundaes") (CBS)
  - Pee-wee's Playhouse (CBS)

1988

- **ABC Afterschool Special** ("Just a Regular Kid: An AIDS Story") (ABC)
  - ABC Afterschool Special ("The Day My Kid Went Punk") (ABC)
  - CBS Schoolbreak Special ("Never Say Goodbye") (CBS)
  - Pee-wee's Playhouse (CBS)

1989

- **3-2-1 Contact** (PBS)
  - Pee-wee's Playhouse ("To Tell The Tooth") (CBS)

==== 1990s ====
1990

- **ABC Afterschool Special** ("Torn Between Two Fathers") (ABC)
  - Pee-wee's Playhouse (CBS)
  - China at the Crossroads (ABC)

1991

- **CBS Schoolbreak Special** ("But He Loves Me") (CBS)
  - Pee-wee's Playhouse (CBS)

1992

- **Scenic Wonders of America** (Disney)
  - Square One TV (PBS)
  - ABC Afterschool Special ("It's Only Rock & Roll") (ABC)

=== Outstanding Single Camera Photography ===
==== 1990s ====
1993

- **Great Wonders of the World** ("Wonders of Nature") (Disney)
  - CBS Schoolbreak Special ("50 Simple Things Kids Can Do to Save the Earth") (CBS)
  - Reading Rainbow (PBS)
  - ABC Afterschool Special ("Shades of a Single Protein") (ABC)
  - This Old House (PBS

1994

- **Reading Rainbow** (PBS)
  - ABC Weekend Special ("CityKids") (ABC)
  - Great Wonders of the World (Disney)
  - This Old House (PBS)
  - The Victory Garden (PBS)

1995

- **ABC Weekend Special** ("Crash the Curiousaurus") (ABC)
  - Beakman's World (CBS)
  - Martha Stewart Living (SYN)
  - Reading Rainbow (PBS)
  - Mighty Morphin Power Rangers (FOC)
  - This Old House (PBS)

1996

- **CBS Schoolbreak Special** ("My Indian Summer") (CBS)
  - CBS Schoolbreak Special ("Crosstown") (CBS)
  - Home Again with Bob Vila (SYN)
  - Reading Rainbow (PBS)
  - This Old House (PBS)

1997

- **Reading Rainbow** (PBS)
  - Beakman's World (CBS)
  - Bill Nye the Science Guy (PBS)
  - Home Again with Bob Vila (SYN)
  - This Old House (PBS)

1998

- **Yan Can Cook** (PBS)
  - Beakman's World (CBS)
  - Reading Rainbow (PBS)
  - The Sports Illustrated for Kids Show (CBS)
  - This Old House (PBS)

1999

- **The Inventors' Specials** ("Galileo: On the Shoulders of Giants") (HBO)
  - Reading Rainbow (PBS)
  - This Old House (PBS)
  - Secrets of the Animal Kingdom (PBS)

==== 2000s ====
2000

- **The Phantom Eye** (AMC)
  - Behind the Screen with John Burke (AMC)
  - B. Smith with Style (SYN)
  - Outward Bound (Discovery Kids)
  - This Old House (PBS)

2001

- **Reading Rainbow** (PBS)
  - Better Homes and Gardens (SYN)
  - Natureworks (PBS)
  - Pets: Part of the Family (PBS)
  - This Old House (PBS)

2002

- **Religion & Ethics Newsweekly** ("The Face: Jesus in Art") (PBS)
  - Behind the Screen with John Burke (AMC)
  - The Book of Pooh (Disney)
  - Martha Stewart Living (SYN)
  - Reading Rainbow (PBS)

2003

- **Our America** (Showtime)
  - Ask This Old House (PBS)
  - Martha Stewart Living (SYN)
  - Reading Rainbow (PBS)

2004

- **Martha Stewart Living** (SYN)
  - Ask This Old House (PBS)
  - Great Hotels (Travel)
  - Full Frontal Fashion (WE)
  - The Victory Garden (PBS)

2005

- **Reading Rainbow** (PBS)
  - Great Hotels (Travel)
  - Inside This Old House (A&E)
  - This Old House (PBS)
  - Travel Gear (Travel)

2006

- **The Victory Garden** (PBS)
  - Everyday Italian (Food)
  - Inside This Old House (A&E)
  - This Old House (PBS)

2007

- **The Victory Garden** (PBS)
  - Everyday Italian (Food)
  - Reading Rainbow (PBS)
  - This Old House (PBS)

2008

- **DragonflyTV** (PBS)
  - Chefs A' Field (PBS)
  - Design Squad (PBS)
  - Dinosapien (Discovery Kids)
  - Food Trip with Todd English (PBS)

2009

- **Equitrekking** (PBS)
  - DragonflyTV (PBS)
  - Flip This House (A&E)
  - Johnny and the Sprites (Disney)
  - This Old House (PBS)

==== 2010s ====
2010

- **The Electric Company** (PBS)
  - Rick Steves' Iran (PBS)
  - Biz Kid$ (PBS)

2011

- **Joseph Rosendo's Travelscope** (PBS)
  - Biz Kid$ (PBS)
  - The Electric Company (PBS)
  - Samantha Brown's Asia ("Bali") (Travel)

2012

- **Equitrekking** (PBS)
  - The Electric Company (PBS)
  - Giada at Home (Food)
  - R. L. Stine's The Haunting Hour: The Series (Hub)
  - Joseph Rosendo's Travelscope (PBS)

2013

- **Born to Explore with Richard Wiese** (SYN)
- **Equitrekking** (PBS)
  - Joseph Rosendo's Travelscope (PBS)
  - R. L. Stine's The Haunting Hour: The Series (Hub)
  - Travel Thru History (MeTV)

2014

- **Giada in Paradise** (Cooking)
  - Jonathan Bird's Blue World (Blueworldtv.com)
  - Made in Israel (ABC Family)
  - The Mind of a Chef (PBS)

2015

- **The Mind of a Chef** (PBS)
  - A Chef's Life (PBS)
  - Gortimer Gibbon's Life on Normal Street (Amazon)

=== Outstanding Cinematography ===
==== 2010s ====
2016

- **The Mind of a Chef** (PBS)
  - A Chef's Life (PBS)
  - Annedroids (Amazon)
  - Joseph Rosendo's Travelscope (PBS)
  - R.L. Stine's Monsterville: Cabinet of Souls (Netflix)

2017

- **SuperSoul Shorts** ("Maggie the Cow") (OWN)
  - Family Ingredients (PBS)
  - Joseph Rosendo's Travelscope (PBS)
  - Rock the Park (SYN)
  - Supernatural Encounters (Daystar)

2018

- **Scars of Nanking** (A&E)
  - An American Girl Story ("Ivy & Julie 1976: A Happy Balance") (Amazon)
  - Buddy Thunderstruck (Netflix)
  - Family Ingredients (PBS)
  - Free Rein (Netflix)
  - Ocean Treks with Jeff Corwin (SYN)
