= Youngmi Mayer =

American stand-up comic

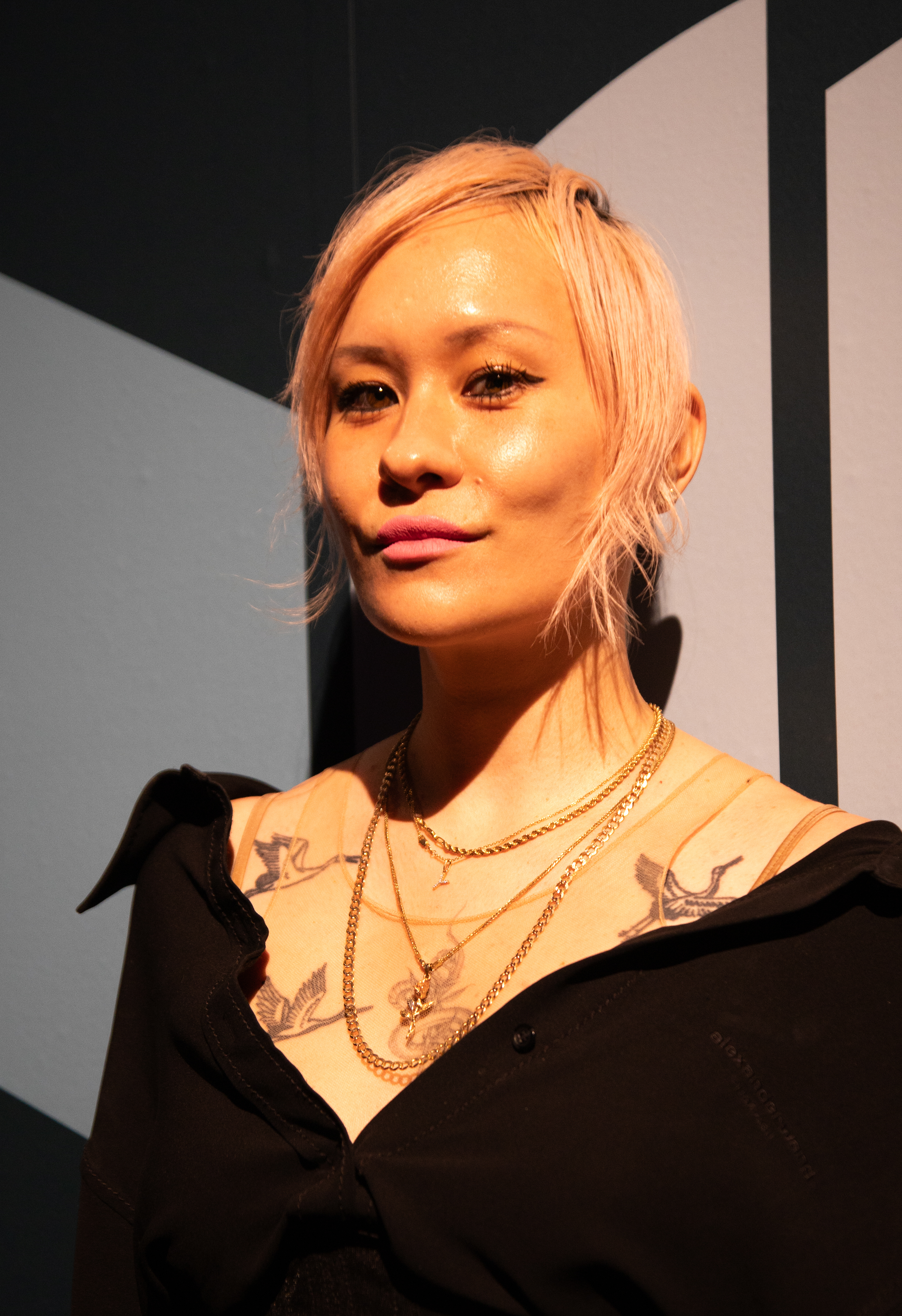
- Mayer in 2025
- Occupations: author; stand-up comedian; activist; podcast host; social media influencer
- Website: youngmimayer.com

Youngmi Mayer is a Korean American author, stand-up comedian, activist, podcast host, and social media influencer. She is the author of I'm Laughing Because I'm Crying and co-host and host of Feeling Asian and Hairy Butthole, podcasts that highlight the Asian American experience.

== Career ==
Mayer explores her experience as a queer, divorced, Korean American single mom in her work. She is known for her funny anecdotes and memes on Instagram and Twitter. Additionally, Mayer writes about racism and dating, understanding Asian trauma in white-dominated spaces, dealing with generational trauma, and Asian-centered stereotypes and translation inconsistencies within popular media.

=== Feeling Asian ===
The podcast Feeling Asian was created in September 2019 by Youngmi Mayer and Brian Park to speak freely about their personal experience as Asian Americans. Mayer and Park interview notable Asian American figures in pop culture including Michelle Zauner, Janet Yang, Lisa Ling, Bowen Yang, and Yaeji. Feeling Asian's episode on "Feeling Asian" was listed number three on CNN's top ten "podcasts that answered our biggest questions in 2021." The podcast was rewarded for its discussion of anti-Asian hate during the COVID-19 pandemic.

== Personal life ==
Mayer was married to Danny Bowien co-founder of Mission Chinese Food. The pair first met in a corner store when Bowien was cooking at an Italian restaurant in San Francisco, where they noticed each other due to their matching hipster clothing. Their marriage was largely secret for a few years, until they made it more public with a ceremony in South Korea.
