= I'm Laughing Because I'm Crying =

Memoir by Youngmi Mayer

- Author: Youngmi Mayer
- Genre: Memoir
- Publisher: Little, Brown and Company
- Publication date: November 12, 2024
- Pages: 256
- ISBN: 978-0-316-56923-1

I'm Laughing Because I'm Crying is a 2024 debut memoir by comedian Youngmi Mayer, published by Little, Brown. It follows Mayer's childhood as a biracial Korean American growing up in Saipan and her experiences as a single mother in New York City, among other parts of her life and identity.

== Critical reception ==
Publishers Weekly wrote that Mayer "blends wit and wisdom in this charming account of growing up biracial in Korea and Saipan," calling it "the arrival of a promising new voice." Kirkus Reviews praised the memoir's treatment of Korean history and culture, writing that "if you can tolerate the use of words as a blunt instrument, this challenging book has a lot to say."

Los Angeles Times called the book "indeed funny" but found that it also "offers trenchant and often painful observations, on growing up mixed race, the suicide crisis in South Korea, and the pervasiveness of white supremacy."

The San Francisco Chronicle called Mayer "outrageously funny" and praised "the book's most rewarding quality: its brutal honesty."

The Rumpus said that "Mayer's unique, bicultural perspective on what makes a good joke is what makes the book compelling...This intercultural awareness and intellectual nimbleness facilitated humor and empathy in equal measure."
