= Ashley Merriman =

Chef

Ashley Merriman is a chef from Center Sandwich, New Hampshire.

She graduated from Hamilton College (class of 1998) and the Institute of Culinary Education (ICE). When Merriman was in New York City, most of the time she worked at Butter and when in Seattle, at Tilth. In 2009, Merriman appeared on season six of Top Chef: Las Vegas, finishing 10th. At that time, she was working as a chef in Seattle at Branzino.

She went east to work for Alex Guarnaschelli and in 2012 took over the kitchen at the Waverly Inn in the West Village.

Merriman is married to fellow chef Gabrielle Hamilton. They bought into The Spotted Pig with restaurateur Ken Friedman but backlash from accusations of sexual harassment by Friedman made them decide to pull out. At the time, they were co-chefs at their restaurant Prune.

In 2021, she was hired as the executive chef at the National Arts Club in Manhattan.
