= The Getaway (TV series) =

2013–2014 American travel TV series

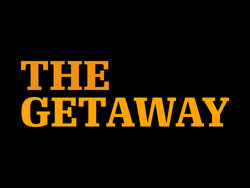
- Genre: Travel documentary
- Country of origin: United States
- Original language: English
- No. of seasons: 2
- No. of episodes: 19

Production
- Executive producers: Anthony Bourdain; Alexandra Lowry; Chris Collins; Craig Shepherd; Lydia Tenaglia
- Camera setup: Multiple
- Running time: 42 minutes
- Production company: Zero Point Zero Production

Original release
- Network: Esquire Network
- Release: September 25, 2013 – December 10, 2014

The Getaway is an American travel documentary television series that aired on the Esquire Network and premiered on September 25, 2013. The Getaway was executive produced by Anthony Bourdain and followed celebrities as they have tours of their favorite or dream destinations for a quick trip.

== Synopsis ==
The Getaway featured travel-loving celebrities, exploring and showcasing their favorite or dream vacation spots. The season premiere featured The Soup host Joel McHale in Belfast, United Kingdom. Other episodes had actor/comedian Aziz Ansari in Hong Kong; actress/comedian Aisha Tyler in Paris, France; rapper Eve in Kingston, Jamaica; and acclaimed chef José Andrés in San Juan, Puerto Rico.

== Broadcast ==
It was set to premiere April 24, 2013, on but was pushed to September 25, 2013, the same week the network re-branding took place in order for Esquire Network to have a broader range of original programs aside from this series and Knife Fight. Season 2 premiered on October 15, 2014.

Internationally, the series premiered in Australia on January 9, 2015 on Nat Geo People.

== Episodes ==
=== Series overview ===
Season	Episodes	Originally released	
Season	Episodes	First released	Last released
1	10	September 25, 2013	November 27, 2013
2	9	October 15, 2014	December 10, 2014

=== Season 1 (2013) ===
No.	Title	Original release date
1	"Joel McHale in Belfast"	September 25, 2013
Joel McHale acts like a local in Belfast, United Kingdom, where he samples a variety of local whiskeys, tries on a tweed wardrobe, takes on a game of golf at one of the greenest golf courses in the world and takes a drive in the DeLorean.
2	"Aziz Ansari in Hong Kong"	October 2, 2013
Aziz Ansari touches down in Hong Kong for full days of eating, drinking and gambling with an array of colorful local personalities. Hotel: Mandarin Landmark Hotel - Central District Leisure: Sha Tin Racecourse - Sha Tin, Victoria Peak, Ping-Pong at Winning Sports Company - Causeway Bay, Palm Reading at Temple Street Market - Jordan, Cable car to Tian Tan Buddha Shopping: Simpson Sin Tailor - Tsim Sha Tsui, Ladies Market - Mong Kok Food: Dim sum at Tim Ho Wan - Sham Shui Po, Open Air Food stall Chan Kun Kee - Sha Tin, Cocktails at 001 Speakeasy - Graham Street Wet Market, Pineapple Buns at Kam Wah Café - Mong Kok, Barbeque Brisket Noodles at Kau Kee - Central District, Japanese Seafood at Ronin - NoHo, Cocktails at Three Monkeys - Central District, Snake soup at She Wong Lam - Sheung Wan District, Barbeque Goose at Yat Lok - Central District
3	"Aisha Tyler in Paris"	October 9, 2013
Aisha Tyler indulges in one of her favorite cities in the world, Paris, revisiting its classic offerings and exploring what's new in the old City of Light.
4	"Josh Gad in New York City"	October 16, 2013
Josh Gad returns to the place that put him on the map, New York City, for an insider tour of the town he fell in love with during his run on The Book of Mormon.
5	"José Andrés in Puerto Rico"	October 23, 2013
Acclaimed chef José Andrés escapes to Puerto Rico to eat, drink and dance his way through San Juan.
6	"Ryan Kwanten in Los Angeles"	October 30, 2013
When True Blood's Ryan Kwanten isn't on set, he makes Los Angeles his playground. Get an insider tour of the active days and decadent nights that make the City of Angels one of his favorite places on earth.
7	"Rashida Jones in London"	November 6, 2013
Actress Rashida Jones revisits one of her favorite places in the world, London, eating and drinking her way through the city with old friends like Chris O'Dowd and Will McCormack. Hotel: The Dean Street Townhouse - Soho Leisure: Last Tuesday Society - Hackney Shopping: Cutler and Gross - Knightsbridge, Perfume at Penhaligon's - Soho Food: Coffee at Bar Italia - Soho, Sunday Lunch at Trullo - Islington, Cocktails at The Bar with No Name (69 Colebrooke Row) - Islington, dinner at J. Sheeky - Covent Garden, English Breakfast at Dean Street Townhouse - Soho
8	"Paul Feig in Boston"	November 13, 2013
After using Boston as the backdrop for his latest hit film, “The Heat,” Director Paul Feig feels compelled to return to the city for a three-day getaway filled with delicious food, quirky adventures, high-end shopping and a tremendous amount of Boston pride.
9	"Eve In Kingston"	November 20, 2013
Rapper Eve eats, drinks and performs her way through Kingston, Jamaica.
10	"Seth & Josh Meyers Get a Drinking Lesson in Amsterdam"	November 27, 2013
Season 1 concludes with brothers Seth and Josh Meyers visiting Amsterdam and indulging in fried food from a vending machine.

=== Season 2 (2014) ===
No.	Title	Original release date
1	"David Koechner in Dublin"	October 15, 2014
Dave Koechner visits Dublin to celebrate Irish classics like tweed, whiskey, dancing and an old sport called Hurling.
2	"Adam Pally in Vegas"	October 22, 2014
Adam Pally and his comedian friends, John Gemberling, Jon Gabrus, Doug Mand and Ben Stricof, spend the weekend gambling, eating, partying and indoor skydiving in Las Vegas.
3	"Chrissy Teigen in Bangkok"	October 29, 2014
Supermodel Chrissy Teigen gets in the ring for a few rounds of Muay Thai, eats at the number-one restaurant in Asia, and risks her life on a Tuk Tuk on her Getaway to Bangkok.
4	"Jack McBrayer in Hawaii"	November 5, 2014
Jack McBrayer heads to Oahu to reconnect with old friends, learn the ukulele, and test his hips with some impromptu hula lessons.
5	"Kyle MacLachlan in Napa Valley"	November 12, 2014
Actor Kyle Maclachlan wines and dines his way through Napa Valley, stopping for oysters, steak, charcuterie, and plenty of wine. After that, he tries a couple less-common Napa activities: racecar driving and zip lining.
6	"Zachary Levi in New Orleans"	November 19, 2014
Zachary Levi visits his favorite city, New Orleans, to enjoy the music with the world famous Preservation hall Jazz Band, the city’s growing foodie scene, a canoe trip through the swamps and, of course, the beignets at Café du Monde.
7	"Yasiin Bey in Morocco"	November 26, 2014
Yasiin Bey, best known as hip-hop artist Mos Def, finds inspiration in Marrakesh, Morocco, from the Jemaa el Fna night market to the traditional music and food of the ancient city.
8	"Jenny Slate in Barcelona"	December 3, 2014
Jenny Slate and Chef Samuel Cots shop at Barcelona's Santa Caterina Market for fresh seafood, cured meats and Spain's famous cheese.
9	"Nat Faxon & Jim Rash in Tokyo"	December 10, 2014
Actor/writers Nat Faxon and Jim Rash cross Tokyo, Japan off their travel bucket list for The Getaway, where they visit an underground ping pong bar, learn karate and visit the hot springs.
