= Mission Chinese Food =

Restaurant in San Francisco, California, U.S.

- Interactive map of Mission Chinese Food

Restaurant information
- Established: 2008
- Location: 2234 Mission Street, San Francisco, California, 94110, United States
- Coordinates: 37°45′40″N 122°25′10″W
- Website: www.missionchinesefood.com

Mission Chinese Food is a restaurant in San Francisco founded in 2008. Previously, the business also operated in New York City. The restaurant is known for its experimental Chinese cuisine, combining traditional spicy Sichuan dishes with cross-cultural influences, including flavors from the Philippines, Vietnam, and Japan.

It has faced several workplace allegations from employees. In 2018, four former workers filed a lawsuit alleging racial discrimination and wage violations. In 2020, following a media investigation, additional allegations emerged of physical and verbal abuse by management.

== History ==
The restaurant began as Mission Street Food, a pop-up food cart on San Francisco's Mission Street, in 2008. It was founded by partners Karen Leibowitz and Anthony Myint, who moved the pop-up into a location shared with an existing Chinese restaurant on the same street in 2010. Chef Danny Bowien was hired to lead the restaurant, which was renamed Mission Chinese Food.

In 2012, Bowien opened a branch on Orchard Street in New York City's Lower East Side, with Angela Dimayuga as executive chef. It drew large crowds but was shut down by health inspectors due to a rodent infestation. A larger East Broadway location opened in late 2014, featuring a two-level space. Mission Chinese opened a Bushwick location in 2018 inside a former warehouse shared with the music venue Elsewhere.

The Lower East Side location permanently closed in September 2020, with Bowien blaming the effects of the COVID-19 pandemic on restaurants. The Bushwick location also closed in July 2022.

In April 2024, Bowien launched a pop-up version of Mission Chinese at Cha Kee, a restaurant in Manhattan's Chinatown.

== Workplace misconduct allegations ==
In 2018, four former employees filed a lawsuit against Mission Chinese Food, Bowien, and managers Adrianna Varedi and Jane Hem. They alleged that the restaurant was a "hotbed of racial discrimination" where Black employees were treated poorly, with retaliation and firings by Hem and Varedi against workers who complained. They also accused the restaurant of wage violations, claiming they were paid less than the legal wage and had breaks deducted from earnings despite not being allowed breaks. The lawsuit was ultimately settled.

In October 2020, a Grub Street investigation interviewed two dozen former Mission Chinese employees, who described additional instances of workplace misconduct. Former employees reported physical and verbal abuse by multiple management figures; the restaurant's chef de cuisine, Quynh Le, seared a staffer's arm with a spoon dipped in hot oil and threatened to punch another cook in the face, while his replacement showed up drunk and threw plates at cooks. Dining room staff felt Varedi and Hem mistreated them, with Varedi enjoying "bullying and humiliating [servers]" and Hem comparing a Black employee's hair to "Grinch fingers".
