= Broken (American TV program) =

Documentary television program

- Genre: Documentary
- Presented by: Jenise Morgan
- Country of origin: United States
- Original language: English
- No. of seasons: 1
- No. of episodes: 4

Production
- Executive producer: Chris Cechin-De La Rosa
- Editors: Victoria Toth, Dena Mermelstein
- Running time: 235 minutes (total)
- Production companies: Netflix; Zero Point Zero

Original release
- Network: Netflix
- Release: November 27, 2019

Broken is a 2019 American investigative documentary television program from Netflix. The program was produced by Zero Point Zero Production. The program consisted of four episodes – two of which were directed by Sarah Holm Johansen and two by Steve Rivo. The program was released on Netflix on November 27, 2019. Each episode deals with one industry and shows interviews with manufacturers, distributors, and others involved in the process. It also highlights several criminal cases brought against these people.

== Episodes ==
No.	Title	Directed by	Original release date
1	"Makeup Mayham"	Steve Rivo	November 27, 2019
2	"Big Vape"	Sarah Holm Johansen	November 27, 2019
3	"Deadly Dressers"	Steve Rivo	November 27, 2019
4	"Recycling Sham"	Sarah Holm Johansen	November 27, 2019

== Reception ==
Reaction to the program has been relatively positive. It is praised for its compelling, human-centered narratives but criticized for focusing on particular issues rather than providing explanation for wider industry problems, or giving the viewer answers as to which brands and products are unaffected by the issues the program presents.
