= Elvis Goes There =

- Genre: Documentary
- Presented by: Elvis Mitchell
- Country of origin: United States
- Original language: English
- No. of episodes: 4

Production
- Executive producers: Simon Helberg; Cora Olson; Jocelyn Towne; Elvis Mitchell; Cheri Barner; Rachel Brill; Lydia Tenaglia; Chris Collins; Craig H. Shepherd; Toby Oppenheimer
- Producer: Jeffrey D. Allen
- Cinematography: Joshua Flannigan
- Editors: Tom Patterson; Yeong-a Kim; Jane Jo
- Running time: 48–55 minutes
- Production companies: Wildline Entertainment; Zero Point Zero Production; MGM Television

Original release
- Network: Epix
- Release: February 4 – February 25, 2019

Elvis Goes There is an American documentary television series hosted by Elvis Mitchell that premiered on February 4, 2019, on Epix.

== Premise ==
Elvis Goes There features "the veteran journalist traveling with A-list filmmakers and actors to places of inspiration around the world, exploring how each location shaped their work and identity."

== Episodes ==
No.	Featured guest	Directed by	Original release date
1	"Paul Feig"	Toby Oppenheimer	February 4, 2019
2	"Ryan Coogler"	Morgan Fallon	February 11, 2019
3	"Sofia Coppola"	Unknown	February 18, 2019
4	"Guillermo del Toro"	Unknown	February 25, 2019

== Production ==
On November 28, 2018, it was announced that Epix had given the production a series order for a first season consisting of four episodes set to premiere on February 4, 2019. Executive producers were expected to include Elvis Mitchell, Cheri Barner, Simon Helberg, Jocelyn Towne, Cora Olson, Lydia Tenaglia, Craig H. Shepherd, and Toby Oppenheimer. Production companies were slated to consist of Wildline Entertainment and Zero Point Zero Productions. Those expected to appear in series included actors and filmmakers with subjects including Paul Feig, Sofia Coppola, Ryan Coogler, and Guillermo del Toro.
