= Paul Bartolotta =

American chef and restaurateur

- Born: June 8, 1961 (age 65); Milwaukee, Wisconsin, United States
- Culinary career
- Cooking style: Italian, French, American
- Current restaurants: Bartolotta, Ristorante di Mare; Ristorante Bartolotta; The Rumpus Room; Bacchus; Mr. B's Steakhouse; Joey Gerard's; Lake Park Bistro; Pizzeria Piccola; Nonna's; North Point Custard

Paul Bartolotta (born June 8, 1961) is an American chef and restaurateur. Most recently he is known for his authentic style and his innovative approach to importing fresh seafood from Mediterranean waters. Paul Bartolotta has won the James Beard Foundation Award twice—once for Best Chef: Midwest (1994, Spiaggia), and again for Best Chef: Southwest (2009), at Bartolotta, Ristorante di Mare at Wynn Las Vegas. He is a recipient of the Insegna del Ristorante Italiano del Mondo, which was awarded to him in 1997 by Oscar Luigi Scalfaro, the President of Italy at the time.

== Early life ==
Bartolotta was born in Milwaukee, Wisconsin, and is the third of Beverly Mae (born as Kopp) and Salvatore "T.J." Bartolotta's four children. His father was of Italian descent and his mother was of Austrian ancestry. He began working in restaurants at the age of 15 and eventually obtained an apprenticeship under John Marangelli, whom he credits with helping to cultivate his sense of “taste.” In 1980, after cooking in local restaurants and graduating from Milwaukee Area Technical College, Bartolotta traveled to New York City. He met restaurateur Tony May, owner of the Rainbow Room at that time, and founder of the Gruppo Ristoratori Italiani. With the support of May, Bartolotta traveled to Italy (where he is also a citizen) in the fall of 1980 for what would become a seven-year education in European cuisine.

== European Apprenticeship and Training ==
During Bartolotta's first seven months in Italy he worked at Locanda dell’Angelo under Chef Angelo Paracucchi in Lunigiana. He then traveled to Imola to work at the Michelin rated two-star Ristorante San Domenico under Chef Valentino Marcattilii and owner Gianluigi Morini, where he earned the title of “Chef di Cucina” at the age of 24. In 1984 Bartolotta moved on to France, where he worked at Relais et Chateau and Traditions et Qualité restaurants under several three star Michelin chefs. Among these were Moulin de Mougins under Chef Roger Verge, Paul Bocuse in Collognes à Mont D’Or, with Chefs Pierre and Michel Troisgros in Roanne, and at the Taillevent in Paris. While in Paris, Bartolotta also took advanced pastry courses in Gaston Le Nôtre's Ecôle Le Nôtre in Plaisir.

== Career (United States) ==
=== New York ===
Bartolotta returned to New York in 1988, and began working for Tony May at two restaurants. He was developing San Domenico NY as head chef while also working at Palio at night, where he met his wife Robbi Eisenmesser. During Bartolotta's tenure at San Domenico NY, it received a three-star review from The New York Times food critic Bryan Miller, a pioneering achievement for an Italian Restaurant. Esquire's food critic John Mariani awarded San Domenico NY with an Esky Award in 1988 for “Best New Restaurant in the U.S.” Around this time, San Domenico NY was also noted as one of the “Top 50 Restaurants in the United States” by Mimi Sheraton of Condé Nast Traveler, and in 1990 and 1991 San Domenico received four stars from Forbes Magazine .

=== Chicago ===
In 1991 Bartolotta left New York for Chicago where he joined Levy Restaurants as head chef of their signature restaurant, Spiaggia. This role involved overseeing Spiaggia (fine dining), the Spiaggia Café, and the Spiaggia private dining rooms facility. From 1991 to 2000 Bartolotta ran Spiaggia; in 1993, in addition to his role as chef, he became a managing partner. In 1994 Bartolotta won the James Beard Foundation award for Best Chef: Midwest. Spiaggia also received the AAA Four Diamond Award consecutively from 1994 to 2000 during Bartolotta's tenure. In 1997 Bartolotta was awarded the Insegna del Ristorante Italiano del Mondo, which recognizes a select group of chefs around the world as authentic ambassadors of Italian cuisine. Spiaggia was noted as one of Restaurants and Institutions Top 100 Restaurants in 1998 and 1999. That same year Spiaggia became Chicago's first and only restaurant to win four stars from both the Chicago Tribune and Chicago (magazine).

=== Milwaukee ===
In 1993 Bartolotta entered into partnership with his brother, Joe Bartolotta, co-founding The Bartolotta Restaurants. As chef and co-owner, the Milwaukee-based restaurant group would go on to start and run one fine dining restaurant (Bacchus, 2004), six upscale casual restaurants (Ristorante Bartolotta, 1993, Pizzeria Piccola, 2003, Lake Park Bistro, 1996, Mr. B's, 1999, Rumpus Room, 2011, and Joey Gerard's, 2012, two locations) and five quick casual restaurants (Nonna's, 1998, two Northpoint Custard locations, 2008 and 2011, and two Pizzeria Piccola locations, 2003 and 2011). Mr. B's, Bartolotta's Lake Park Bistro, and Ristorante Bartolotta respectively won the DiRoNA (Distinguished Restaurants of North America) award. The Bartolotta brothers also established Bartolotta Catering and Special Events Company that exclusively caters to Pier Wisconsin (2005) and The Grain Exchange (2008). In 2009 a partnership was established with SSP America at General Mitchell International Airport to include Nonna's (Concourse D), North Point Custard (Main Terminal), and Pizzeria Piccola (Concourse C).

=== Las Vegas ===
In 2004 Bartolotta left Chicago for Las Vegas, after being selected by Steve Wynn to conceptualize, develop, and run the hotel's Italian restaurant. This became BARTOLOTTA, Ristorante di Mare, his namesake restaurant. Located in Wynn Las Vegas, BARTOLOTTA, Ristorante di Mare seated approximately 258, imported 1 to 1.5 tons of seafood per week, and served it within 19 to 48 hours of being caught in the Mediterranean. Significant effort was expended to keep track of the seafood during air transport, including the use of small microchips to monitor temperature. On site is a tank facility was overseen by a full-time marine biologist, Yasmin Tajik. BARTOLOTTA, Ristorante di Mare was one of only 12 restaurants in the world, and the only restaurant in the Western Hemisphere, to serve fresh-caught langoustines, a phenomenon explored at length in a Departures (magazine) article published in January 2011. In 2006 BARTOLOTTA, Ristorante di Mare received a James Beard nomination for Best New Restaurant, and in 2009 Bartolotta won the James Beard Foundation award for Best Chef: Southwest. BARTOLOTTA, Ristorante di Mare has also received the AAA Four Diamond Award from 2006 to 2012, and received a Forbes Four Star award in 2012. It was announced in July, 2015 that Bartolotta would leave the Wynn Las Vegas. On Sunday October 18, 2015 BARTOLOTTA, Ristorante di Mare served their final meal.

== Media Appearances ==
=== American Television ===
- Guest chef on the CBS daytime show The Talk, October 2012.
- Guest appearance cooking live with Jimmy Kimmel on Jimmy Kimmel Live!
- Guest chef on NBC's The Today Show, 2006 and 2010.'
- Celebrity guest judge on the Bravo reality show Top Chef
- Featured chef on ABC's Nightline: Platelist
- WABC-TV's Live with Regis and Kelly, November 2009
- Gourmet's Diary of a Foodie
- Iron Chef America
- Travel Channel with Samantha Brown
- The Martha Stewart Show

=== French Television ===
- Cuisinez Comme Un Grand Chef with Joël Robuchon

=== Italian Television ===
- Gambero Rosso Channel's I Grandi Cuochi
- Le Merediana with Luigi Veronelli, RAI

== Restaurants ==
- BARTOLOTTA, Ristorante di Mare, Wynn Las Vegas

=== The Bartolotta Restaurants ===
- Ristorante Bartolotta, Wauwatosa, WI
- Bacchus - A Bartolotta Restaurant, Milwaukee, WI
- Bartolotta's Lake Park Bistro, Milwaukee, WI
- The Commodore - A Bartolotta Restaurant, Delafield, WI
- Harbor House, Milwaukee, WI
- Joey Gerard's - A Bartolotta Supper club, Greendale and Mequon, WI
- Mr. B's - A Bartolotta Steakhouse, Brookfield, WI
- Mr. B's - A Bartolotta Steakhouse, Mequon, WI
- Downtown Kitchen, Milwaukee, WI

== Awards ==
- James Beard Foundation Award, 2009 - Best Chef, Southwest
- James Beard Foundation Award, 1994 - Best Chef: Great Lakes
- James Beard Foundation Award Nomination, 2006 - Best New Restaurant
- AAA Four Diamond Award, AAA, 2006 - 2012, BARTOLOTTA, Ristorante di Mare
- AAA Four Diamond Award, AAA, 1994 - 2000, Spiaggia
- Insegna del Ristorante Italiano del Mondo, 1997
- Distinguished Restaurants of North America (DIRONA), Spiaggia, 1993, 1999 and BARTOLOTTA, Ristorante Di Mare, 2000
- Restaurants and Institutions’ Ivy Award, 2008, BARTOLOTTA, Ristorante di Mare
- Restaurants and Institutions’ Ivy Award, 1993, Spiaggia
- Restaurants and Institutions Top 100 Restaurants, 1998 and 1999, Spiaggia
- International Food Service Manufacturers Association (IFMA), Culinary Excellence Award, 1993, Spiaggia
- Nation's Restaurant News’ Hall of Fame Award, 1992, Spiaggia
- Silver Spoon Award, 2009.
