= Rotten (TV series) =

2018 American web television series

- Genre: Documentary
- Created by: Christine Haughney
- Developed by: Christine Haughney; Erin D. Cauchi; Gretchen Goetz
- Voices of: Latif Nasser
- Country of origin: United States
- Original language: English
- No. of seasons: 2
- No. of episodes: 12

Production
- Executive producer: Ted Schillinger
- Editors: Andrew Adolphus; Ali Muney; Dena Mermelstein
- Running time: 48–63 minutes
- Production companies: Netflix; Zero Point Zero

Original release
- Network: Netflix
- Release: January 5, 2018 – October 4, 2019

Rotten is an investigative documentary series produced by Zero Point Zero, focusing on corruption in the global food supply chain. The show's first season was released on Netflix in January 2018, and the second season in October 2019. Each show "dives deep into the food production underworld to expose the corruption, waste and real dangers behind your everyday eating habits," featuring interviews with manufacturers, distributors, and others. The series uncovers wrongdoing by corporations who control the food that we eat and shortcomings by governments who have the mandate to oversee or regulate the sources of these food.

== Episodes ==
=== Season 1 ===
| No. overall | No. in season | Title | Directed by | Original release date |
|---|---|---|---|---|
| 1 | 1 | "Lawyers, Guns and Honey" | Lucy Kennedy, Bill Kerr | January 5, 2018 |
| 2 | 2 | "The Peanut Problem" | Ted Gesing, Bill Kerr | January 5, 2018 |
| 3 | 3 | "Garlic Breath" | David Mettler | January 5, 2018 |
| 4 | 4 | "Big Bird" | Ted Gesing | January 5, 2018 |
| 5 | 5 | "Milk Money" | Lucy Kennedy | January 5, 2018 |
| 6 | 6 | "Cod Is Dead" | David Mettler | January 5, 2018 |

=== Season 2 ===
| No. overall | No. in season | Title | Directed by | Original release date |
|---|---|---|---|---|
| 7 | 1 | "The Avocado War" | Lucy Kennedy | October 4, 2019 |
| 8 | 2 | "Reign of Terroir" | Abigail Harper | October 4, 2019 |
| 9 | 3 | "Troubled Water" | Daniel Ruetenik | October 4, 2019 |
| 10 | 4 | "A Sweet Deal" | Lucy Kennedy | October 4, 2019 |
| 11 | 5 | "Bitter Chocolate" | Abigail Harper | October 4, 2019 |
| 12 | 6 | "High on Edibles" | Daniel Ruetenik | October 4, 2019 |

== Reception ==
The second season was nominated for a News & Documentary Emmy Award for "Outstanding Business and Economic Documentary", while the reporting team — journalists Christine Haughney, Erin D. Cauchi, and Gretchen Goetz — won the 2020 James Beard Media Award for "Visual Reporting (on TV or Online)." General reception to the series has also been positive, with an average rating of 86% on Rotten Tomatoes.

The first season was praised for its "exploration of how corporate greed and corruption have quite literally changed the nature and origins of the food America consumes." It also received accolades for high-quality cinematography and compelling, human-centered narratives but was criticized for focusing on particular issues rather than providing explanation for wider industry problems, or giving the viewer answers as to which brands and products are unaffected by the issues the series presents.
