= Pat LaFrieda Meat Purveyors =

Artisanal meat purveyor

Coordinates: 40.7799°N 74.0381°W

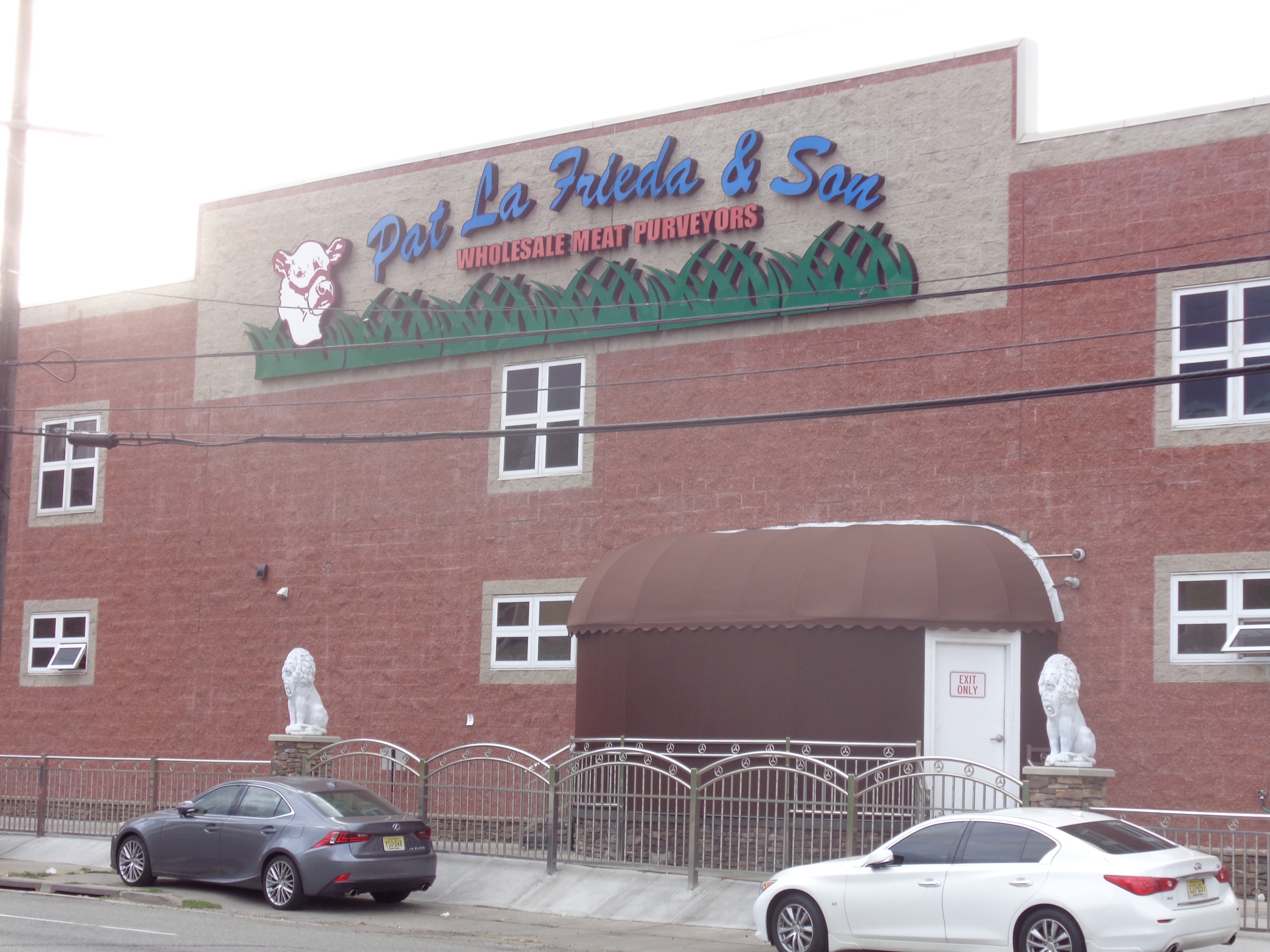
- Type: Private
- Industry: Food processing
- Founded: 1922
- Headquarters: North Bergen, New Jersey, USA
- Key people: Pat LaFrieda Jr. (CEO);
- Products: Meat
- Revenue: US$400 million
- Website: www.lafrieda.com

Pat LaFrieda Meat Purveyors is a third generation meat wholesaler based in North Bergen, New Jersey that specializes in dry-aged steaks and artisanal burger patties but also supplies selected cuts of beef, pork, poultry, veal, lamb and buffalo. The company provides meat for the “Black Label Burger” at Minetta Tavern, as well as other signature custom blends at New York City restaurants such as Shake Shack, Spotted Pig, Union Square Café, Blue Smoke and Market Table.

== History ==
Pat LaFrieda Meat Purveyors began when Anthony LaFrieda (Pat LaFrieda Jr.’s great-grandfather) immigrated to the United States from Naples, Italy, in 1909 and opened a butcher shop in Brooklyn, New York in 1922. In 1950, Pat LaFrieda I and his brother Louis LaFrieda took advantage of a meat workers strike and opened “LaFrieda Meats” in New York City's meatpacking district on West 14th Street. In 1964, Pat LaFrieda I and his son Pat LaFrieda II (known today as Pat Sr.) took full ownership over LaFrieda Meats and changed the name to Pat LaFrieda Meat Purveyors. As business grew, the shop changed locations several times (from West 14th Street, to Little West 12th Street, and then to Bleecker Street) but finally settled on Leroy Street (also known today as Pat LaFrieda Lane) in 1980.

In the following decade, the company’s economic condition began to decline as the restaurants that Pat Sr. did business with either closed down or decided to buy their meat supplies from larger meat companies such as Sysco. The company was able to turn itself around when Pat LaFrieda Jr. (Pat Sr.'s son) took over the company in 1993. Previously working as a stockbroker, Pat Jr. used his business knowledge to revive the company. He established new relationships with restaurants, invested half of the company’s profits back into the business, and purchased new equipment that led to higher efficiency.

=== Rise to Fame ===
Although Pat LaFrieda Meat Purveyors have always had a respectable reputation in the meatpacking industry, they were still relatively unknown. It was not until the early 1990s—when Chef Mario Batali made Pat LaFrieda’s company the primary provider of his restaurants—that they began to receive more attention. As Mario Batali gradually rose to prominence, restaurateurs such as Danny Meyer (owner of Shake Shack) also decided to choose Pat LaFrieda Meat Purveyors as their main meat supplier. In 2004, when Shake Shack started serving Pat LaFrieda’s custom burger blend, both the restaurant and the meat company became famous. Since then, the company has become quite popular as Pat LaFrieda Jr. began to appear on television shows such as Martha Stewart, ABC News Nightline, Anthony Bourdain's No Reservations, Andrew Zimmern’s Bizarre Foods, and The Mike Colameco show on PBS. New York Magazine has even dubbed Pat LaFrieda Jr., “The Magician of Meat”. On April 4, 2012 the meat supplying company debuted in a reality show on Food Network called “Meat Men”. The show documented the inner workings of the company and followed Pat LaFrieda Jr., his father Pat LaFrieda Sr. and his cousin Mark Pastore through their work. Besides appearing on television, the company has also had a mobile-app developed for them by the production company Zero Point Zero.

=== Profile ===
Inside the facilities of Pat LaFrieda Meat Purveyors are “two dry-aging rooms that house 5,000–6,000 (sub) primal cuts of meat (the equivalent of over 80,000 steaks)”. They also own multiple grinders that produce 100,000 burgers every night. Because the company operates 24 hours a day, six days a week, Pat LaFrieda Jr. claims that the company is able to “process meat that feed over 300,000 people a day.” They also cater to about 9,000 restaurants, most of which are located in New York City. To meet the needs (for burger patties) of these restaurants and other customers, Pat LaFrieda Jr. works with restaurants to produce customized burger patties that contain varying percentages of fat combined with brisket, chuck, short rib, and skirt steak. So far he has come up with 25–30 distinct blends of burger patties with hundreds of additional variations available. One of the many restaurants that follow this combination is Minetta Tavern, which uses an 80/20 lean meat to fat ratio for their burgers. Pat LaFrieda Meat Purveyors' operations bring in more than $40 million in annual revenues.

== See also ==
- Food industry
