= Melissa Hamilton (author) =

American chef and cookbook author

Melissa Hamilton is an American chef and cookbook author, and was the head of Saveur’s test kitchen.

== Biography ==
Hamilton comes from a culinary family. Her father owns Hamilton's Grill Room in Lambertville New Jersey and her sister Gabrielle owns a restaurant in NYC named Prune.

== Career ==
Along with partner Christopher Hirsheimer, they founded Canal House Cooking magazine. In 2013, the team won a James Beard Award for the best book in the General Cooking category. The book was called Canal House Cooks Every Day.

They also opened Canal House Station in July 2019, a restaurant in Milford, New Jersey which was nominated for a 2022 James Beard Award.
