= SciGirls =

Children's television series from PBS Kids

- SciGirls logo
- Also known as: SciGirls in the Park (season 7)
- Genre: Educational entertainment; Reality television
- Created by: Twin Cities PBS
- Written by: Kerri Grant
- Starring: Lara Jill Miller; Greg Cipes
- Voices of: Lara Jill Miller; Greg Cipes
- Theme music composer: Steve D'Angelo; Terry Tompkins; Jeff Morrow
- Country of origin: United States
- Original language: English
- No. of seasons: 7
- No. of episodes: 46 (List of episodes)

Production
- Executive producers: Richard C. Hudson; Emily Stevens
- Producers: Angie Prindle; Marie Domingo
- Animators: Soup2Nuts (seasons 1–3); Duple Media (seasons 4 and 6); Curious Media (season 5); Primal Screen (season 7)
- Running time: 28 minutes
- Production company: TPT Productions

Original release
- Network: PBS Kids Go!
- Release: February 11, 2010 – December 13, 2012
- Network: PBS Kids
- Release: April 16, 2015 – June 23, 2023

SciGirls is an American live-action/animated children's television series. It was produced by Twin Cities PBS and builds on the "real kids doing real science" approach of DragonflyTV.

It is an educational outreach program for elementary school children based on proven best practices for: science, technology, engineering and math (STEM) education for girls. It was launched in February 2010 and produced by Twin Cities Public Television, the episodes are broadcast on most PBS stations and the project's website, SciGirls,

The show was designed to encourage girls to pursue STEM careers, in response to the low numbers of women in many scientific careers.

A sixth season themed around NASA was confirmed and completed, and it premiered on February 3, 2023. The seventh and final season premiered three months later on May 26, 2023.

== Overview ==
Each episode depicts the STEM-themed activities of a group of middle-school girls, including engineering a miniature wind farm, creating a turtle habitat, designing an electronic dress, and more.

Additionally, women scientists and engineers mentor the girls, demonstrating that interest in STEM subjects can lead to a rewarding lifelong pursuit. The series is unified by two animated characters, Izzie (voiced by Lara Jill Miller) and Jake (voiced by Greg Cipes), who emphasize how science and technology can help solve problems in everyday life.

These characters also appear on the series website, integrated into the TV episodes.

== Characters ==
- Izzie (voiced by Lara Jill Miller) is a 12-year-old girl with a constantly expanding assortment of interests. She also acts as the webmaster for the SciGirls website, which hosts a database of science videos following real-life SciGirls. This resource often comes in handy, because whenever Izzie encounters a tricky situation, she can zap herself into her computer and follow along with the girls' investigations. Afterward, she is easily able to design a solution to her dilemma.
- Jake (voiced by Greg Cipes) has known Izzie since they were in preschool and has remained her closest friend. He usually meets up with Izzie at school, online, or around the town. Jake finds himself drawn into Izzie's scientific situations more often than not.
- Fang, Jake's pet mouse, can often be found helping Jake and Izzie on their STEM-filled adventures.

Alongside Izzie and Jake, each episode features a group of real girls (not actors) working alongside a woman STEM professional.

== Episodes ==
=== Series overview ===
Season	Episodes	Originally released	
Season	Episodes	First released	Last released
1	12	February 11, 2010	April 29, 2010
2	10	October 11, 2012	December 13, 2012
3	6	April 16, 2015	May 21, 2015
4	6	February 1, 2018	March 8, 2018
5	5	December 12, 2019	January 9, 2020
6	2	February 3, 2023	February 10, 2023
7	5	May 26, 2023	June 23, 2023

=== Season 1 (2010) ===
No. overall	No. in season	Title	Original release date	Prod. code
1	1	"Turtle-Mania"	February 11, 2010	101
When Izzie's new school club is a bust, she seeks help from the SciGirls. They teach her about evaluating habitats for turtles and she adapts the information to make her club more appealing.
2	2	"Puppet Power"	February 18, 2010	102
Jake convinces Izzie that if she wants to become class President, she has to be taller. To accomplish it she looks to the SciGirls for inspiration as they create massive sized May Day Parade puppets with elaborate features.
3	3	"Dolphin Dive"	February 25, 2010	103
Izzie finds herself unable to figure out Jake when he loses his voice. She turns to the SciGirls who are observing and researching dolphin behavior, in the hopes of learning a new way to understand Jake by using the SciGirls help.
4	4	"Digging Archaeology"	March 4, 2010	104
When Jake's lucky socks go missing before his science test, Izzie goes to the SciGirls for help. Their investigations into Native American archaeology inspire her to treat Jake's messy locker like a dig site.
5	5	"Horsing Around"	March 11, 2010	105
The Sadie Hawkins dance is approaching and Izzie has to choose between two potential dates. She decides to model her selection process upon a series of SciGirls experiments designed to select the most ideal horse for an upcoming competition.
6	6	"Blowin' in the Wind"	March 18, 2010	106
Concerned about the Earth's limited resources, when Izzie's laptop runs out of power she and the SciGirls investigate alternative power sources.
7	7	"High Tech Fashion"	March 25, 2010	107
Izzie makes preparations for a triathlon, but realizes she isn't able to wear all athletic gear at the same time. Turning to the SciGirls, she learns how fashion and technology can be merged.
8	8	"Science Cooks!"	April 1, 2010	108
Jake loves eating snack food rather than terrible tasting healthy food, much to Izzie's concern. Luckily she finds four SciGirls who are out to remake their favorite meals into healthier, appetizing versions for their families.
9	9	"Underwater Eco-Adventure"	April 8, 2010	109
Izzie is confused when she is described as "the Most Unique Dresser" at school. To find out if she's being complimented or not she compares notes with two SciGirls studying biodiversity.
10	10	"Robots to the Rescue"	April 15, 2010	110
Jake and Izzie attempt to catch Fang, his escaped pet mouse, with the aid of a remote controlled car with a camera. Fang bolts whenever the vehicle approaches, so they learn from the SciGirls how to make robots with better communicative skills.
11	11	"Going Green"	April 22, 2010	111
After going through a huge amount of Mighty Munchies containers, Jake and Izzie realize they have to take care of the mess. She follows three SciGirls who are designing new ways to reuse and recycle materials from their school's trash.
12	12	"Star Power"	April 29, 2010	112
In a bid to help Jake distract a group of Talent Show judges with flashy lights, she tags along with two SciGirls as they research light pollution.

=== Season 2 (2012) ===
The second season is the last season to air during Soup2Nuts' activity.

No. overall	No. in season	Title	Original release date	Prod. code
13	1	"Aquabots"	October 11, 2012	201
The second season opens at the U.S. Naval Academy. Akina and friends dive into underwater robotics at the US Naval Academy, building a "Sea Perch" ROV to investigate artificial oyster reefs in Chesapeake Bay.
14	2	"Mother Nature's Shoes"	October 18, 2012	202
Nature's designs, from polar bear paws to penguin flippers, inspire Elin and her best friends to design a safer shoe for walking on Minnesota's icy winter streets.
15	3	"Habitat Havoc"	October 25, 2012	203
Budding naturalist Lea and her SciGirl pals investigate what the non-native Canary Island Palm does to San Diego habitats, comparing the palms to native trees.
16	4	"The Awesome App Race"	November 1, 2012	204
San Francisco SciGirls shake things up, programming their own smartphone app to highlight the history and geoscience of the 1989 San Francisco Earthquake.
17	5	"Multitasking Mania"	November 8, 2012	205
Can teens – juggling computers, smartphones, music, homework, and TV at the same time – multitask as well as they think they can? Alejandra and her friends find out.
18	6	"Insulation Station"	November 15, 2012	206
Cold weather, hot science! SciGirls Greta and her 6th grade pals use passive solar heat and bubble-wrap insulation to warm up an ice shanty on a frozen Minnesota lake.
19	7	"Workin' It Out"	November 22, 2012	207
Jekima and friends break a sweat in steamy South Carolina—hiking, playing soccer, dancing and doing yoga—all to find out, "what's the best exercise for me?"
20	8	"Bee Haven"	November 29, 2012	208
What's the buzz in urban gardens? The SciGirls use math, mapping and data visualization to help a colony of bees thrive in a downtown Phoenix neighborhood.
21	9	"Pedal Power"	December 6, 2012	209
Best friends Angela, Olivia, Margaret and Rebecca don welding masks and rev up power tools to engineer an ice cream-maker that's powered by their bikes.
22	10	"Super Sleuths"	December 13, 2012	210
At a forensics summer camp, super sleuths Emi and friends team up with real forensic scientists to solve the mysterious theft of the priceless 'Queen of the Forest' ceremonial mask.

=== Season 3 (2015) ===
The third season marks the first season to air after Soup2Nuts' closure, despite being still listed in the credits from the season.

No. overall	No. in season	Title	Original release date	Prod. code
23	1	"Frog Whisperers"	April 16, 2015	301
A decline in the amphibian population is investigated.
24	2	"Flower Power"	April 23, 2015	302
The arrival of spring, and how it impacts flowers and plants, is investigated;Jake grows his hair to win the Hair-a-Doozy contest.
25	3	"SkyGirls"	April 30, 2015	303
Three girls from Virginia team up with NASA scientists to compare clouds seen from the ground to satellite images.
26	4	"Butterfly Diaries"	May 7, 2015	304
A video diary capture the metamorphosis of caterpillars into butterflies.
27	5	"Feathered Friends"	May 14, 2015	305
Three Denver girls create a bird habitat in a city school garden.
28	6	"Terrific Pacific"	May 21, 2015	306
A junior lifeguard and her friends study the health of the Pacific Ocean with marine scientists; and make a conservation video for beach visitors.

=== Season 4 (2018) ===
Note : Jake is absent.

No. overall	No. in season	Spanish title (top) English title (bottom)	Original release date	Prod. code
29	1	"Baile Digital"	February 1, 2018	401
29	1	"Digital Dance"	February 1, 2018	401
A high-tech dance show features robotics and light-up dance costumes.
30	2	"Gallinas de Ciudad"	February 8, 2018	402
30	2	"City Chickens"	February 8, 2018	402
Designing and building a chicken coop for an urban farm by recycling a donated structure into a new home where the birds can thrive.
31	3	"Escuadron Espacial"	February 15, 2018	403
31	3	"Space Squad"	February 15, 2018	403
Texas SciGirls team up with NASA materials engineers to create water bottle insulators.
32	4	"Atletas Maravillosos"	February 22, 2018	404
32	4	"Awesome Athletes"	February 22, 2018	404
Inspired by Olympic athletes, SciGirls in San Diego create a fitness boot camp.
33	5	"Mejorando Procesos"	March 1, 2018	405
33	5	"Process Power"	March 1, 2018	405
SciGirls in Arizona design a streamlined service plan for a food bank to help high school students in need.
34	6	"Asombrosos Arboles"	March 8, 2018	406
34	6	"Terrific Trees"	March 8, 2018	406
Exploring the benefits that big trees bring to ecosystems, and the differences between trees in the rainforest and the city.

=== Season 5 (2019–20) ===
No. overall	No. in season	Title	Original release date	Prod. code
35	1	"High Tech Tide"	December 12, 2019	501
SciGirls in Florida unite with marine biologists to digitally track spotted eagle rays.
36	2	"Game Changers"	December 19, 2019	502
Jolie and friends team up with professional game designers to create their own board game.
37	3	"Super Sensors"	December 26, 2019	503
Inspired by NASA satellite cameras, SciGirls build and code their wildlife cameras.
38	4	"Cartoon Coders"	January 2, 2020	504
The SciGirls create a computer action urging kids to take positive action.
39	5	"Code Concert"	January 9, 2020	505
Britanee, Estrella, and Saabirrinn use code to turn music into a stunning visual display.

=== Season 6: SciGirls in Space (2023) ===
This season is titled "SciGirls in Space" and is listed as specials on TPT's website.

Note : Jake is absent.

No. overall	No. in season	Title	Original release date	Prod. code
40	1	"Dakota Stars"	February 3, 2023	601
Indigenous SciGirls learn how modern science connects to ancestral Dakota star knowledge.
41	2	"Making Space"	February 10, 2023	602
SciGirls are on a mission to reduce the harmful effects of isolation during deep spaceflight.

=== Season 7: SciGirls in the Parks (2023) ===
All five episodes from the seventh and last season were released online on May 26, 2023. The season is titled "SciGirls in the Parks" and is the final season.

No. overall	No. in season	Title	Original release date	Prod. code
42	1	"Flashy Fireflies"	May 26, 2023	701
Reagan, Kyra, and Jayden visit Congaree National Park and learn about its unique fireflies.
43	2	"Salamander Tales"	June 2, 2023	702
Tennessee SciGirls explore Great Smoky Mountains National Park in search of salamanders.
44	3	"Dragonfly Detectives"	June 9, 2023	703
SciGirls on Lake Michigan's sandy shores collect dragonflies to monitor water quality.
45	4	"Awesome Alaska"	June 16, 2023	704
Alaskan SciGirls, Gracie, Indigo, and Evie, explore their local parks for scientific data.
46	5	"River Rescuers"	June 23, 2023	705
In Minnesota, Jenny, Hope, Dani, and Amelia track pollution in the river.

== Broadcast ==
The show aired on PBS Kids Go! from 2010 until 2013. After Go! was shut down, it then aired on its sister channel PBS Kids from April 16, 2015 to June 23, 2023.

As of 2025, the series is able to stream on Amazon Prime Video.

Five episodes ("Star Power," "Super Sensors," "SkyGirls," "Escuadron Espacial/Space Squad" and "Dakota Stars") are available through NASA+.
