= DragonflyTV =

American educational television series

- Created by: Dr. Richard Hudson
- Starring: Michael Brandon Battle (seasons 1–4); Mariko Nakasone (seasons 1–4); Eric Artell (seasons 5–7)
- Music by: Adam Dornblum; Chuck Barth (Telco-syndicated prints); Larry Brown (Telco-syndicated prints)
- Opening theme: "DragonflyTV" by Adam Dornblum (PBS prints)
- Country of origin: United States
- Original language: English
- No. of seasons: 7
- No. of episodes: 72

Production
- Running time: 30 minutes
- Production company: Twin Cities Public Television

Original release
- Network: PBS Kids (2002–2004); PBS Kids Go! (2004–2008); Broadcast syndication (2009–present)
- Release: January 19, 2002 – December 20, 2008

DragonflyTV (subtitled GPS: Going Places in Science for seasons 5–6, and Nano for season 7) is an American science education television series produced by Twin Cities Public Television. The show aired on PBS Kids from January 19, 2002, to December 20, 2008. It was aimed at ages 9–12 years old. Seasons 1–4 were co-hosted by Michael Brandon Battle and Mariko Nakasone. Seasons 5–7 were hosted by Eric Artell and were produced in partnership with science museums. DragonflyTV was created in collaboration with Project Dragonfly at Miami University, which founded Dragonfly magazine, the first national magazine to feature children's investigations, experiments, and discoveries. DragonflyTV pioneered a "real kids, real science" approach to children's science television and led to the development of the SciGirls television series. DragonflyTV and SciGirls were funded in part by the National Science Foundation to provide a national forum for children's scientific investigations.

Since the series' cancellation, DragonflyTV continued to air reruns until September 6, 2009. Select local PBS stations continued to air the show until 2019, and later in off-network syndication to allow commercial stations to meet federal E/I mandates.

== Episodes ==
=== Season 1 (2002) ===
No. overall	No. in season	Title	Original release date	Prod. code
1	1	"Investigate!"	January 19, 2002	101
A Girls in Engineering, Math and Science team designs, builds, and tests a robot to compete in the FIRST LEGO League robotics competition while Martial Arts athletes Kha and Peta determine how different tae kwon do moves challenge their bodies systems and then learn what they learned in competition. Also in this episode Simi, Jenny and Danny kayak down a raging river, relating river speed to rock size and discover which rock to avoid the most.
2	2	"Wheels"	January 26, 2002	102
Twin Motocross Racers Tamara and Tara explore what impact their body positions have on their motorcycle jumps, while Skateboarders Scott and Anthony experiment with different sized wheels that have the best in terms of maximizing speed and maneuverability. Two young inventors named Patrick and Justin show how skis and scooters can pair up to speed through the snow. Riddle question: How can you ride a square-wheeled bike?
3	3	"Animal Behavior"	February 2, 2002	103
Dog owners Anna and Laura test their dog's performances on intelligence tests, while Jouse and Michelle compare otter grooming habits. Riddle question: How do you keep birds off an airplane runway?
4	4	"Water"	February 9, 2002	104
Champion surfer Carsten explores how the terrain around different beaches affects the sport on waves, while Hilary investigates how dolphins make friends, observing pair bonding among dolphins. Also in this episode, Valerie and Margie tackle two twisty waterslides to determine which is speediest and most "wild." Riddle question: How do you weigh a whale?
5	5	"Rocks"	February 16, 2002	105
Simi, Jenny and Danny kayak down a raging river and learn how rock size affects speed, while Climbers Gordon and Jesse explore different types of rock as they scale sheer cliffs in Aspen, Colorado. Riddle question: How can you cut rocks without a saw?
6	6	"Flight"	February 23, 2002	106
Alex and Ryan, model airplane pilots, investigate how different wing designs affect how the stunt planes perform. David, Abby and Alex use a thermal camera to determine how the terrain below affects the paraglider in flight.
7	7	"Weather"	March 2, 2002	107
Melissa and Elizabeth visit the site of a recent tornado and examine the damage to determine the tornado's strength on the F Scale. Sullivan and Alexa engineer their own tornado model to explore how tornados are made. Also Mari and Lindsay test traditional forecasts against modern weather predictions.
8	8	"Technology"	March 9, 2002	108
A GEMS team (Girls in Engineering, Math and Science) make a robot to compete in the "First LEGO League" contest. Isaac and Anjali find out how their model solar car performs as the sun moves across the sky at different times of day.
9	9	"Plants"	March 16, 2002	109
Elissa and Julia track a swarm of weevils charged with saving the Everglades from invasive melaleuca trees, while certified Scuba divers Megan and Ian meet some amazing creatures in an underwater kelp forest. Maddie, Mia, Ally and Mikki investigate how leaves change color in the fall.
10	10	"Air"	March 23, 2002	110
GiGi and Emmanuel investigate how sail position affects speed of sailboats, and Masha and Patsy check out how the temperature inside a hot-air balloon makes them soar in the sky or sink to the ground.
11	11	"Human Behavior"	March 30, 2002	111
Maddy and Martina investigate how inaccurate human perception can be. Zahabiya and Christopher investigate people's reactions to roller coasters.
12	12	"Space"	April 6, 2002	112
Sarah, Shakivia and Erica send coconut snacks into orbit aboard the Space Shuttle to investigate how the coconut would be as a space food. Chris and Vanessa make models of moon craters, then compare their models with the view through their own telescopes.
13	13	"Human Body"	April 13, 2002	113
Young Martial Arts athletes Kha and Peta determine how different tae kwon do moves challenge their bodies' skeletal and muscular systems, and then attempt to do what they learned in competition.

=== Season 2 (2003) ===
Teams of DFTV's kid scientists demonstrate different approaches to investigations – experimental, engineering, and observational.

No. overall	No. in season	Title	Original release date	Prod. code
1	14	"Investigate!"	January 18, 2003	201
Elliot and Rhianna explore how to avoid dizziness while performing their most difficult figure skating spins. Kart racers Allie and Paige of Team "Beat the Boys", use an onboard computer to find the optimum gear ratio for their kart before a race. Do big animals grow faster than small animals? Matt, Kyndal and Danny experiment by tracking the growth patterns of a chick, a piglet and a calf. Dr. Phillip Tong explains the art and science of inventing new ice cream flavors.
2	15	"Structures"	January 25, 2003	202
Can snow keep you warm? Morgan, Rio and Thianna of Aspen, Colorado, explore the mysteries of insulation by building an igloo-like shelter called a quinzhee, and measuring the temperatures inside and outside all night long. Brenett, Kim, Lucretia and Omney test straw, stucco and cinder blocks to find the most economical and durable building material and engineer Jose Rostrepo designs earthquake-resistant buildings.
3	16	"Sport Science"	February 1, 2003	203
Dana and Alicia build a soccer ball kicking machine to determine how muscle power and leg speed affect their kicks. Matt and Kelley explore how boat speed affects their ability to perform waterskiing stunts. Alex, Sarah and Sasha determine which length of "balancing pole" is most effective on the highwire and Microsoft game designer David Ortiz designs Xbox's NFL Fever 2002 game.
4	17	"Spinning"	February 8, 2003	204
Jon, Andrew and Zach explore how different arm positions affect their 360-degree spins in the freeride skiing half-pipe. Yo-Yo champs John, Kevin and Minna find out if a longer yo-yo string makes a yo-yo sleep longer and meteorologist Jason Dunion researches the power of hurricanes.
5	18	"Propulsion"	February 15, 2003	205
Mary Lynn, Jessica and Aren test different model rocket designs to find out which features increase how high the rocket flies. Kart racers Allie and Paige of Team "Beat the Boys" use an on-board computer to find the optimum gear ratio for their kart before a race and engineer Dick Yue investigates how fish swim with "Robotuna", a robotic tuna.
6	19	"Human Body"	February 22, 2003	206
Figure skaters Elliot and Rhianna explore how to avoid dizziness while performing their most difficult spins. Aaron and Justin investigate which SPF lotion really works best at keeping out the sun's harmful UV rays. Jada and Maurna test their friends to determine whether physical activity improves memory and Dr. Phillip Tong explains the art and science of inventing new ice cream flavors.
7	20	"Sound"	March 1, 2003	207
Kyla and Jenna explore how the beats per minute (BPM) of hip-hop songs affect the way a dancer dances. Sabrina and Tarissa use a decibel meter to monitor the surprising and sometimes dangerous sounds in their favorite New York hang-outs. Julian and Sabrina create sound spectrum snapshots of prairie dog barks to explore animal communication and scientist Joseph Pompei pinpoints sound with his "Audio Spotlight". Riddle question: How do you make the sound of 100 people marching?
8	21	"Technology"	March 8, 2003	208
Ravi and his friends pit GPS technology against a traditional compass and map to determine which orienteering tools are most effective. Karl engineers a robot, modifying and testing its "weapons" for the greatest competitive edge and teen scientist Ryan Patterson demonstrates his award-winning electronic glove that translates sign language.
9	22	"Ecosystems"	March 15, 2003	209
Andy, Mason and Marshall investigate whether more salmon thrive in Washington's Dewatto River or Union River. Carlos and Akeem study the nesting habits of Juno Beach's baby turtles, determining what conditions are optimal for survival. Victoria and Alejandra investigate why some plants thrive and others cannot withstand the elements on the Guadalupe-Nipomo Sand Dunes and tree-climbing scientist Nalini Nadkarni explores the survival of forest canopies.
10	23	"Underwater"	March 22, 2003	210
Chris, Cory, Nikki and Bruce design and use their own deep-sea remotely operated vehicle (ROV) to explore the health of their local coral reefs. Ronnie and Denise investigate the fish population in their tribal lakes. Kristen and Christopher track manatees, using the scars inflicted on the animals by boat motors as identifying marks and aquatic scientist Lisa MacCartney shares her fascination with octopuses.
11	24	"Mammals"	March 29, 2003	211
Do big animals grow faster than small animals? Matt, Kyndal and Danny track the growth patterns of a chick, a piglet, and a calf. Robyn and Alex alter some sea lions' diets to see if food impacts the amount of time the animals hunt and play. Cleo, Brittany and Molly investigate if their cats have a "dominant paw", and primate specialist Lisa Parr tests chimpanzees to better understand the human mind.
12	25	"Earth Explorations"	April 5, 2003	212
JR and Ari investigate why Moab's mountain biking terrain varies so widely. Caitlyn, Meredith and Margi explore how sinkholes form and mineralogist Liz Arredondo uses garnets to uncover the earth's secrets.
13	26	"Creepy Crawlies"	April 12, 2003	213
TJ and Courtney explore whether crocodiles can be trained to do simple tasks. LeighAnne and Carmen investigate the relationship between a snake’s tongue flicking and its food preference. Environmentalist Kevin "digs worms" – literally, and shows how to build your own worm farm. Entomologist Betty Faber studies the complexities of cockroaches.

=== Season 3 (2004) ===
No. overall	No. in season	Title	Original release date	Prod. code
1	27	"Investigate!"	January 17, 2004	301
While rafting on the American River, Rasheed, Kohner, Scotty and JB measure the river grade, water flow and study the flow patterns around eddies, holes, and tongues. Rachel and Sarah build their own hovercraft out of plywood, a picnic tablecloth and a leaf blower. Young equestriennes Mallory and Ting don faux horse ears, positioned to signal both contentedness and aggression, to investigate how their horses communicate and NASA robotics research engineer, Dr. Ayanna Howard, uses artificial intelligence (AI) to make robots "smarter".
2	28	"Sports Science"	January 24, 2004	302
Avid ski jumpers Karl, Garrett and Johnny use GPS technology to examine the differences between modern and "old school" jumping styles. Hockey players Tess, Alison and Christina investigate how sticks of different stiffness affect the speed of their shots. Mike Lowe and Brian Sidwell design and test bicycle helmets for ultimate safety and weather resistance.
3	29	"Wind"	January 31, 2004	303
Danielle, an accomplished sport kite flyer, wants to learn how the height-width proportion of a kite (called its aspect ratio) affects the kite's performance during competitive maneuvers. Using common household items, Nathanial constructs his own wind tunnel to measure the aerodynamic efficiency of toy race cars. Weather researcher Ameri Gurley studies the damaging effects of tornadoes and hurricanes.
4	30	"Forensics"	February 7, 2004	304
Kalia and Caroline use forensic research methods to gather evidence at a birthday party "crime scene". Aaron and Tevi examine the construction of the Coral Castle, a Florida landmark consisting of over 1,000 tons of coral, to solve the mysteries behind its construction. Jose Alimirall is a criminalist who uses forensic science to solve legal disputes. Using physical evidence such as glass, residue, or drugs, he identifies criminals and helps bring them to justice.
5	31	"Engineering"	February 14, 2004	305
Rachel and Sarah build their own hovercraft out of plywood, a picnic tablecloth and a leaf blower. Ciara, Brittney and Maria engineer a boat entirely out of milk cartons to enter in a hometown race. Mechanical engineer Una-May O'Reilly designs mobile robots. Her research in artificial intelligence (AI) will eventually give human faces and personalities to robots.
6	32	"Earth Systems"	February 21, 2004	306
While rafting on the American River, Rasheed, Kohner, Scotty and JB measure the river grade, water flow and study the flow patterns around eddies, holes and tongues. Underwater geologist Carol Reiss' research helps scientists better understand earthquakes. She has studied the ocean floor firsthand in the submersible, the Turtle.
7	33	"Animal Behavior"	February 28, 2004	307
Young equestriennes Mallory and Ting don faux horse ears, positioned to signal both contentedness and aggression, to investigate how their horses communicate. Keshia and Ashley visit the New Jersey Aquarium to explore ways to keep the African penguins busy and active, by observing their behavior at feeding time. Neurobiologist Erich Jarvis studies birds and their songs, to learn how the brain controls complex behaviors, such as language.
8	34	"Speed"	March 6, 2004	308
Speedskaters Eric, Lisa, Ned and Sarah investigate what types of turns optimize their speed and maneuverability in short track racing. To determine which tire pressure will allow them to maintain speed and control through turns, mountainboarders, Sean, Ben and Neil create a mini-course and ride it at different tire pressures. Ryan Newman, NASCAR driver and engineer, creates faster, safer race cars using mathematics, computer simulations and other technologies.
9	35	"Health"	March 13, 2004	309
Cancer survivor Jeff and his sister Jenny conduct a study with kids undergoing medical treatments to see if pets can help lessen pain. Jordan and Sydney use Glo-Germ technology to track the spread of germs from their hands and clothes at a party with their friends. Cameron and Ashley investigate if skipping breakfast affects their classmates' testing abilities and nutritionist, Corey Scott, researches the nutritional composition of fruits and vegetables to help develop healthier snacks. Riddle question: How do you measure bad breath?
10	36	"Habitats"	March 20, 2004	310
Marie and Michelle explore the California Cavern to discover how speleothems vary with differing conditions in the cave. Gillian considers the properties of two neighboring lizard habitats to understand why lizards are numerous in one and not the other. Susie and Katie investigate what's causing the malformations at their neighborhood frog pond. Biologist Erin Gilliam uses a "virtual bat", which is a technology that mimics real bat sounds and calls.
11	37	"Games"	March 27, 2004	311
Lara wants to know how she and her fifth-grade friends can gain a competitive advantage against the older kids at YMCA camp. Jay and Jonathan investigate how their starting hand position on the ball affects scoring from the free-throw line. Mary Jane and Eliza investigate the physics behind carnival games to increase their chances of winning and engineer Katie Broughton designs and builds motorized toys that mimic real-life motion
12	38	"Space/Astronomy"	April 3, 2004	312
Tianna and Sammy investigate weightlessness in space by watching what happens to their favorite toys in a free-fall "drop box." Young astronomers T.J. and Trey trek the Arizona desert to learn what infra-red imaging can reveal about the Martian landscape. Megan, Monica, Jenny and Emilia create miniature weather monitors and launch them on their model rockets to learn what it takes to successfully record data on a distant planet. Dr. Ayanna Howard is a robotics research engineer who uses artificial intelligence (AI) to make robots "smarter".
13	39	"Dogs"	April 10, 2004	313
Veteran mushers Alexa, Jenaya and Miriah want to create a "dream team" of sled dogs so they test their dogs' several compatibility factors. Elizabeth and Caitlin create a fetching investigation using colored and grey tennis balls to determine if their pets Sassie and Chime are colorblind. Ben Ho trains dogs in search and rescue (SAR) techniques. His work has aided lost hikers, natural disaster victims and survivors of the extreme 9/11 tragedy in New York City.

=== Season 4 (2005) ===
No. overall	No. in season	Title	Original release date	Prod. code
1	40	"Energy"	January 15, 2005	401
En garde! Paula and Alyssa investigate the energy and impact of different fencing moves. Kha and Peta, young martial arts athletes, determine how different tae kwon do moves challenge their bodies’ skeletal and muscular systems and then apply what they learned in competition. Dr. Joel Boyd orthopedic surgeon works with athletes to get them ready for the game. Riddle question: How can you go 80 miles per hour on a bicycle?
2	41	"Engineering"	January 22, 2005	402
Kid engineers Bob and Brennan fine-tune the number of tire studs required to speed a bike across a frozen lake. Karl engineers a robot, modifying and testing its "weapons" for the greatest competitive edge. Ayanna doesn't just make robots, she makes robots smarter. She's using artificial intelligence to build the next Mars rover.
3	42	"Animal Behavior"	January 29, 2005	403
Jerika and Shannon stage a mini-Olympics for their pet rabbits, observing how different breeds – and different body types – fare in the bunny challenges. Robyn and Alex alter some sea lions' diets to see if food impacts the amount of time the animals hunt and play and primate specialist, Lisa Parr, tests chimpanzees to better understand the human mind.
4	43	"Friction"	February 5, 2005	404
Slippery scientists Mimi, Haley, Tara and Lauren investigate how the rotation of the curling stone and the act of sweeping the ice changes the path of the stone... and determine the winner! Rachel and Sarah build their own hovercraft out of plywood, a picnic tablecloth and a leaf blower and Travis uses science and engineering to create innovative solar race cars.
5	44	"Sound"	February 12, 2005	405
Against the bumpin' backdrop of a volleyball game, Brittney and Maggie explore how noisy communication with their teammates affects their performance. Sabrina and Tarissa use a decibel meter to monitor the surprising and sometimes dangerous sounds in their favorite New York hang-outs. Neurobiologist Erich Jarvis studies birds and their songs to learn how the brain controls complex behaviors, such as language.
6	45	"Canines"	February 19, 2005	406
Who's afraid of the big, bad wolf? Not Zachary and Jerit, who explore pack behavior to figure out how wolves know the "top dogs" – the alpha male and female. Veteran mushers Alexa, Jenaya and Miriah want to create a "dream team" of sled dogs, so they test their dogs' several compatibility factors. Ben Ho trains dogs in search and rescue (SAR) techniques. His work has aided lost hikers, natural disaster victims and survivors of the extreme 9/11 tragedy in New York City. Riddle question: How do you keep your dogs cool on a hot summer's day?
7	46	"Science at Play"	February 26, 2005	407
Francesca, Marnika and Precious jump into a Double Dutch investigation to figure out whether they depend more on seeing the rope or on hearing its rhythmic snap. Maddy and Martina investigate how unreliable human perception can be. Corliss Outley is a scientist who studies play habits of children in large cities. Whether a child lives in the country or in the city, she has found that all children look for places to play in their area.
8	47	"Earth Systems"	March 5, 2005	408
Elizabeth and Margie hit the links at the Science Museum of Minnesota to explore how rivers change the shape of the landscape. Victoria and Alejandra investigate why some plants thrive and others cannot withstand the elements on the Guadalupe-Nipomo Sand Dunes and tree-climbing scientist, Nalini Nadkarni, explores the survival of forest canopies.
9	48	"At the Zoo"	March 12, 2005	409
Chelsea and Camille invent enrichment equipment for zoo animals. Julian and Sabrina create sound spectrum snapshots of prairie dog barks to explore animal communication. Dr. Laurie Marker is a "hero of the planet" for her work in preserving cheetahs in Africa. At the Cheetah Conservation Fund, she works with other scientists who study and care for these magnificent cats. She has developed ways for cheetahs and ranchers to live side-by-side, making the African plains safe for both parties.
10	49	"Biochemistry"	March 19, 2005	410
Young chemists explore the formulations of make-up like lip gloss and lotion to determine the most marketable new products. Kalia and Caroline use forensic research methods to gather evidence at a birthday party "crime scene". Dr. Phillip Tong explains the art and science of inventing new ice cream flavors. Note: Like Fetch! Episode "Kids Do Foods in "Tryin Chef".
11	50	"Human Body"	March 26, 2005	411
Divers Niki and Jaq use a high-speed camera to explore how their body positions reduce splash and improve their performance. Avid ski jumpers Karl, Garrett and Johnny use GPS technology to examine the differences between modern and "old school" jumping styles. Andy is a project scientist at the MIT Center for Space Research. His current project is to study how humans adapt to the topsy-turvy, zero-gravity atmosphere of long space flights.
12	51	"Mammals"	April 2, 2005	412
Mickey and her new friends observe the world’s fastest cats at the Cheetah Conservation Fund site in Namibia, Africa. Do big animals grow faster than small animals? Matt, Kyndal and Danny track the growth patterns of a chick, a piglet and a calf. Large animal vet, John Fetrow, otherwise known as Dr. Moo, works at Wisconsin’s Cow Transition Management Facility where he researches the birth cycle of cows.
13	52	"Simple Machines"	April 9, 2005	413
Angus and Jonathon team up for some medieval adventure, as they design, build and test a trebuchet. Kart racers Allie and Paige of Team "Beat the Boys", use an onboard computer to find the optimum gear ratio for their kart before a race. Tammy never gets all bent out of shape! She's a bioengineer who specializes in seat ergonomics, which helps people sit in healthier postures.

=== Season 5 (2006) ===
No. overall	No. in season	Title	Original release date	Prod. code
1	53	"Pittsburgh"	April 8, 2006	501
Amy and Maya investigate why bogs help keep organic material from decaying and view the preserved humans in "The Mysterious Bog People", a traveling exhibit at Carnegie Museum of Natural History. Tyler and Aditya design their own rollercoaster and test it on a simulator at the Carnegie Science Center, finishing their investigation on "Phantom's Revenge", a roller coaster at a nearby amusement park. And at the Pittsburgh Convention Center, DragonflyTV reveals a Science Secret that makes other cities green with envy.
2	54	"Dallas and Fort Worth"	April 15, 2006	502
Fossil detectives Brandy and Ashley discover that not everything about dinosaurs is gigantic when they dig for microfossils with the Fort Worth Museum of Science and History. Reed and Nick get game at the Science Place in Dallas, answering the question: so just where is the "sweet spot" on my bat? And in Science Secret, DragonflyTV uncovers a very clever pesticide at Discovery Gardens, a certified organic public garden.
3	55	"Los Angeles"	April 22, 2006	503
Milan and Harison go deep, comparing California fish at the Long Beach Aquarium of the Pacific to those in the wild. While at the California Science Center's Big Lab, Max and Brian create model sailboats and then set sail in the Pacific to determine the most efficient design. And DragonflyTV heads to the La Brea Tar Pits in the Science Secret to check out the Ice Age inhabitants of L.A.
4	56	"Minneapolis and Saint Paul"	April 29, 2006	504
Inspired by the IMAX movie Stomp, Maxine and Hannah create their own musical instruments at the Science Museum of Minnesota. Rylee, who uses a myoelectric prosthetic arm, heads to The Bakken Museum and Library to explore how the electrical signals in her body help her arm function. And Paige and Nick check out the "Animal Grossology" exhibit at the Science Museum of Minnesota before investigating how animals depend on their sense of smell at the Minnesota Zoo. In the Science Secret, find out what happens when you fill the Mall of America, one of world's largest shopping malls, with almost 40 million visitors each year.
5	57	"New York"	May 6, 2006	505
Jenn and Emily, members of the Junior United States Luge Team, slip slide away at the New York Hall of Science playground, investigating gravity and then applying what they learn to maximize their timings on the icy tracks at Lake Placid. Stanley and Jessica go ape, checking out the Bronx Zoo's Congo Gorilla Forest to see how plants and animals coexist in the layers of the African Rainforest. In the Science Secret, find out what’s not so natural about New York's Central Park—the most frequently visited urban park in the United States.
6	58	"Phoenix and Tucson"	May 13, 2006	506
Alexandra and Anna learn about construction techniques at the Arizona Science Center's "Many Hands Make a Home" exhibit, trying out what they learn on a house for their dog, Rupert. Alex and Mark head to the Arizona-Sonora Desert Museum to see which creatures make the Saguaro cactus home. And in the Science Secret, DragonflyTV learns how Chase Field—the only facility in world that has retractable roof, air conditioning and a natural turf field—keeps its grass green and growing.
7	59	"San Francisco"	May 20, 2006	507
Starting at Lawrence Hall of Science, Claire and Nisha walk the lines—the San Andreas and Hayward fault lines—to learn what causes earthquakes. Inspired by the "Light and Color" exhibit at the Exploratorium, a group of industrious middle schoolers create their own interactive art installation. And in Science Secret, DragonflyTV demystifies how antique cable cars continue to conquer the city's incredible hills.

=== Season 6 (2007) ===
No. overall	No. in season	Title	Original release date	Prod. code
1	60	"Alaska"	April 14, 2007	601
Deborah and Brittani stop by the Mendenhall Glacier Visitor Center in Juneau to get information on glaciers before hopping a helicopter to study the size and location of the glacier using a combination of old photographs and modern equipment. At the Southeast Alaska Discovery Center, Emma and Grace of Ketchikan learn about the Tongass National Forest, the largest temperate rain forest in the world, and investigate tree growth rates.
2	61	"New Mexico"	April 21, 2007	602
Alex and Andrew take their interest in hot air balloons to new heights at Explora before participating in Albuquerque's annual International Balloon Fiesta. Emily and Isabel learn about caves at the New Mexico Museum of Natural History and Science then help band cave swallows at world renowned Carlsbad Caverns.
3	62	"North Carolina"	April 28, 2007	603
And super SciGirls Sophia, Valencia, and Sarah get inspired at the North Carolina Museum of Life and Science in Durham to compare the level of biodiversity in three different types of wetlands.
4	63	"Montana/Yellowstone"	May 5, 2007	604
Ellen and Nicole dig up a dinosaur bone at Egg Mountain in Montana and then figure out the age of this dinosaur when it died at the Museum of the Rockies. Phoebe and Shannon stop by the Yellowstone National Park's Canyon Visitor Center before letting loose in the park to investigate why some areas in Yellowstone have geysers and others do not. Fossil detectives Brandy and Ashley discover that not everything about dinosaurs is gigantic when they dig for microfossils with the Fort Worth Museum of Science and History.
5	64	"New England"	May 12, 2007	605
Elle, John, Nick and Linnea prepare for MIT's Friday After Thanksgiving Chain Reaction event by building dynamic, kinetic sculptures with the help of the MIT Museum in Cambridge, Massachusetts. Chloe and Jessie investigate water pressure at the Montshire Museum of Science in Norwich, Vermont and create a gravity-powered fountain.
6	65	"The Deep South"	May 19, 2007	606
Joshua and Sean get down and dirty in Birmingham, Alabama, with "garbology" at the Southern Environmental Center. In Jackson, Mississippi, Katelyn and Blake learn about the swamp habitats alligators prefer with the help of the Mississippi Museum of Natural Science.
7	66	"Hawaii"	May 26, 2007	607
Starting at Hawaii Volcanoes National Park's Kilauea Visitor Center, Briana and Julia learn all about lava flow on the Big Island. And DragonflyTV explorers Zach and Devin swim with sea turtles at the Maui Ocean Center while helping assess the readiness of captive-born juveniles for release into the wild.

=== Season 7 (2008) ===
No. overall	No. in season	Title	Original release date	Prod. code
1	67	"Size and Scale"	November 15, 2008	701
What's Nano? Ebony and Jasmine catch the Amazing Nano Brothers Juggling Show at the Museum of Science (http://www.mos.org) in Boston. The show gets them thinking, "How big is a billion? And how small is a billionth?" They search Boston for examples of a billion, then visit laboratories at Harvard University to find examples of nanoscale objects on their quest to "see" a nanometer. Where's Nano? Regina, Linda, Harrison, Jared, Lorenz and Randi, visit the "Zoom In" exhibit at the Morehead Planetarium and Science Center (http://www.moreheadplanetarium.org) in Chapel Hill. They wonder what examples of nanoscale science and technology they can find in their everyday lives. Their nano "scavenger hunt" takes them to the University of North Carolina Chapel Hill, where a scientist helps them print images of nanoscale structures. The kids then create a visual representation of their findings to display at the science center.
2	68	"Structure of Matter"	November 22, 2008	702
Hockey Sticks Nicholas and Jordan love hockey. They know that carbon nanotubes are used in some hockey sticks, but aren't sure how the tiny structures change the equipment. They head to Boston's Museum of Science (http://www.mos.org) to learn more about carbon nanotubes. Then, they put their sticks to the test on the ice. Finally, with help from scientists at Harvard University, they compare the tensile strength of the sticks and use powerful microscopes to "see" carbon nanotubes. Butterfly Wings Emily and Julie check out the Magic Wings Butterfly House at the Museum of Life and Science (http://www.ncmls.org) in Durham. They wonder why butterfly wings are so colorful. They learn that iridescence in some butterfly wings—like the iridescence of soap bubbles—results from their structure. At Duke University, the girls learn how to determine whether colors in wings are the result of pigment or nanoscale structures. They test butterfly wings and learn that blue iridescence is due to structure, not pigment.
3	69	"Small is Different"	November 29, 2008	703
Surface Area After discovering that ordinary flour dust can be explosive, Lara and Anushua explore the importance of surface to area to volume ratio at the Science Museum of Minnesota (http://www.smm.org). They conduct soda explosion experiments in the museum's Big Back Yard, investigating how surface area affects reactions. Finally, they visit the University of Minnesota where they learn how scientists are developing more affordable solar cells with nanotechnology. Stained Glass Alettie and Yvonne visit the Glass Experience exhibit at the Museum of Science and Industry (http://www.msichicago.org) in Chicago and learn that nanoparticles are responsible for the colors in some medieval stained glass. The girls are surprised to learn that nanogold makes glass red! They go to Northwestern University to explore the relationship between size and color of nanoparticles. They create different sizes of gold and silver nanoparticles to produce a variety of colors, which they use to make their own works of art.
4	70	"Forces at the Nanoscale"	December 6, 2008	704
Gecko Feet Jennifer and Nooshin like rock climbing. They wonder how some lizards can climb rocks so easily. They visit the Lawrence Hall of Science (http://www.lawrencehallofscience.org) in Berkeley and compare the climbing ability of different lizards. They notice that the best climbers are geckos. They visit a lab at the University of California, Berkeley to find out why, learning that special, nanoscale hairs on gecko feet are the secret to their amazing climbing abilities. Nasturtium Leaves Jasmine and Melinda wonder why water beads up on some plants and not others. They head to San Francisco's Exploratorium (http://www.exploratorium.edu), where they learn that surfaces at the nanoscale aren't always smooth, and that nano hairs on nasturtium leaves cause them to repel water. They take some plant samples to Stanford University to compare the structure of nasturtium leaves to water-resistant fabric.
5	71	"Applications"	December 13, 2008	705
Self Assembly Keely and Connor learn about self-assembly at the Children's Museum of Houston They visit Rice University, where scientists use self-assembly to make things at the nanoscale. At Rice, a scientist helps the kids use self-assembly to make and "pop" microcapsules. The kids then try out a similar technique at home, encapsulating chocolate sauce, mint and other flavors in alginate beads to serve on ice cream. Bone Regrowth Kobel, Nathan, and Adam go to the Oregon Museum of Science and Industry (OMSI) where they learn that scientists use nanotechnology to help regenerate nerves and bones. A scientist from Brown University explains that a solution of nanotubes and minerals is injected into a fracture and forms a scaffold to encourage bone regrowth. The kids ask why both ingredients are needed for bone repair and they try solutions with different amounts of each ingredient on sponges and test how much weight each treated sponge supports.
6	72	"Nanotechnology and Society"	December 20, 2008	706
Water Clean Up Taylor and Gabe go to the Franklin Institute in Philadelphia and learn that nano-iron is being used to neutralize toxins in ground water. They collect soil samples from a contaminated site, then take them to Penn State University to test the efficacy of nano-iron treatments. Nanosilver Sarah and Mande visit the Sciencenter in Ithaca and learn that nanosilver is used in some socks to kill bacteria, keeping them odor-free. They wonder if the nanosilver in socks leaches out when you wash them, causing potential harm to beneficial bacteria and the environment. They buy two different brands of nanosocks and wash them. Then they take the socks and their wash water to Cornell University to test their effects on common bacteria.

== Telco-syndicated series ==
In 2009, after DragonflyTV ended, the series was sold to off-network syndication and the rights were handed over to Telco Broadcasting. 62 of the 72 episodes were re-packaged, while 10 episodes have their own original versions intact. Edits included replacing licensed music with generic music, resulting in a new theme song (which replaced the original hip-hop theme with a new generic tune with kids chanting the show's name).
