= Danny Bowien =

American chef (born 1982)

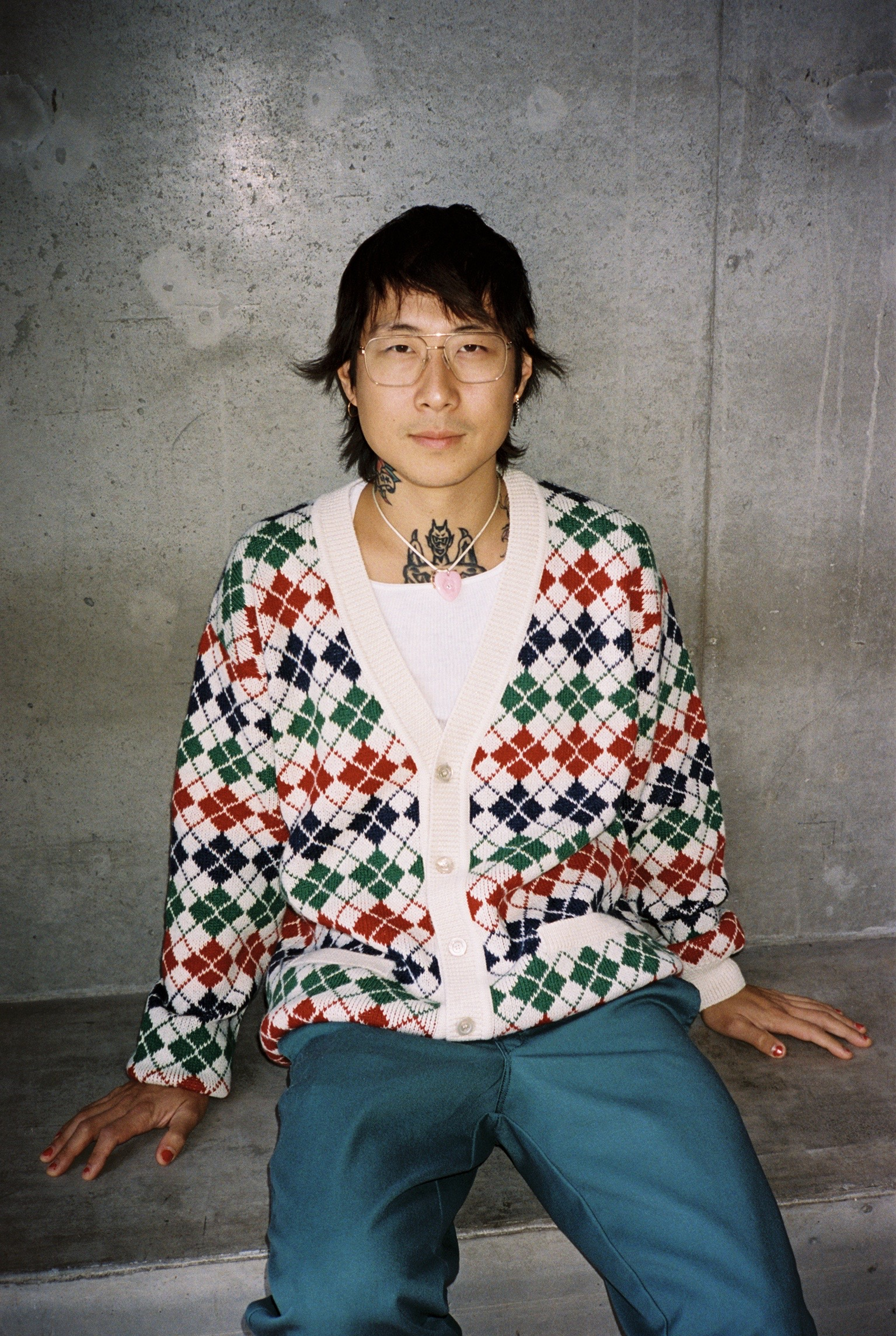
- Born: James Daniel Bowien; 1982 (age 43–44); South Korea
- Occupation: Chef

James Daniel Bowien (born 1982) is a Korean-born American chef and restaurateur. He is the founder and owner of Mission Chinese Food in New York City and Brooklyn and co-founder of Mission Chinese Food in San Francisco, California. Bowien is a James Beard Award winner, and the main subject of season six of the food and travel show The Mind of a Chef.

== Early life ==
Bowien, born in South Korea, was adopted at a young age by a family in Oklahoma. Growing up as one of the only Korean Americans in school left him without a clear sense of identity, and his roots in Asian culture fostered a need to do something respectable. He had various jobs, including as a dishwasher in a Vietnamese restaurant, and at age 19 he moved to San Francisco.

== Career ==
After a spell in culinary school Bowien worked at several restaurants in the San Francisco Bay Area, including the Italian restaurant Farina. Through his work there he was sent to the 2008 Pesto World Championships in Genoa, Italy, where he won first place.

Bowien partnered with Anthony Myint on a series of food truck pop-ups including Mission Street Food and Mission Burger, and with the owners of a Chinese restaurant called Lung Shan on Mission Street, started Mission Chinese Food as the first restaurant-within-a-restaurant pop-up. It was named the second Best New Restaurant in America by Bon Appetit Magazine and fourth Best New Restaurant in America by GQ Magazine. Bowien was nominated the 2011 Rising Star Chef by the San Francisco Chronicle, and in 2012 he was a James Beard Award Finalist. He was included in Food and Wine Magazine's 40 Big Thinkers under 40, and San Francisco Chronicle’s Bay Area 30 under 30.

After leaving San Francisco in 2012 Bowien opened a standalone Mission Chinese Food in New York City's Lower East Side. In 2013, he opened a Mexican restaurant, Mission Cantina, in New York. Mission Cantina was closed 3 years later. In May 2013, Bowien was awarded the prestigious "Rising Star Chef" by the James Beard Foundation for his work in the Mission Chinese Food in San Francisco and New York City.

In 2014 Bowien moved Mission Chinese Food to New York's Chinatown. In 2017, Bowien was chosen to be the main subject of the sixth season of the food and travel show The Mind of a Chef. It premiered on November 14, 2017, on Facebook Watch. In 2018, Bowien opened a new Mission Chinese Food location in Bushwick, Brooklyn in front of the independent music venue Elsewhere. In September, 2020, Bowien announced permanent closure of the Mission outpost on East Broadway in Chinatown, due to the hardships COVID-19 had on the hospitality industry. While the Mission Chinese Food in Chinatown had closed permanently by the end of September 2020 due to the coronavirus pandemic, the Bushwick location remained open. In 2022, he closed all of his New York City locations permanently.

By late April 2024, Bowien would open a pop-up Mission Chinese at 43 Mott Street, within the Cha Kee restaurant in NY Chinatown. The restaurant will keep its Cha chaan teng HK Cafe menu, but would change to a Japanese fusion Chinese cuisine by 5 PM. His residency ended by August.

== Culinary style ==
Bowien is recognized for his impact on the democratization of fine dining. Bowien is known as a populist, making food that is accessible to everyone. His work in the kitchen is notable, according to GQ, for pioneering the elevation of Chinese food and breaking down barriers in an industry known for its strict Eurocentric hierarchy.

== Personal life ==
Bowien was married to Korean-American comedian Youngmi Mayer. The pair first met in a corner store when Bowien was cooking at an Italian restaurant in San Francisco, where they noticed each other due to their matching hipster clothing. Their marriage was largely secret for a few years, until they made it more public with a ceremony in South Korea. After they divorced in 2018, Bowien dated a fashion intern.
