= Gourmet's Diary of a Foodie =

- Also known as: Food Lovers Guide to the Planet
- Genre: Food documentary
- Country of origin: United States
- Original language: English
- No. of seasons: 3
- No. of episodes: 53

Production
- Production location: Various
- Running time: 26 minutes
- Production companies: WGBH-TV and Zero Point Zero Production

Original release
- Network: Public television stations in the United States, National Geographic Channel elsewhere
- Release: October 7, 2006

Gourmet's Diary of a Foodie (also known internationally as Food Lovers Guide to the Planet) is a documentary television program focusing on food, the culture of food, cuisine, and gastronomy. The show was affiliated with Gourmet magazine.

== Show format ==
Episodes generally fall into these topic categories:

- The cuisine of a particular region, such as China, Southern India, or Tasmania
- Insight from a particular chef, such as José Andrés, Paul Bartolotta, or Lydia Shire
- Cuisine involving a common ingredient/item, such as water, bread, or chili peppers
- A specific facet of food culture, such as people who prefer traditional methods over modern technology, food bloggers, or ancient traditions
- The intersection of food and the environment, such as "green" cuisine, bovine food, or farm food
- A specific type of cuisine, such as dessert, trompe-l'œil, or grilling

Each episode also features a recipe generally demonstrated by one of Gourmet magazine's editors in their test kitchen. The show is divided into segments, each introduced by an unseen narrator, and featuring relevant experts in on-location discussions.

== Production ==
The show came about because executives at WGBH wanted to capture the "foodie" audience. WGBH turned to New York-based Zero Point Zero Production led by Lydia Tenaglia and Michael Selditch. Zero Point Zero produced the show with WGBH, in association with Gourmet magazine and Discovery Networks International. Director of Photography Zach Zamboni used a Panasonic AG-DVX100 camcorder to capture the footage.

The series premiered Oct. 7 2006 on PBS.

== Recognition ==
The October 2006 episode received a 2006 James Beard Foundation Award.
