= Gabrielle Hamilton (chef) =

American chef and author

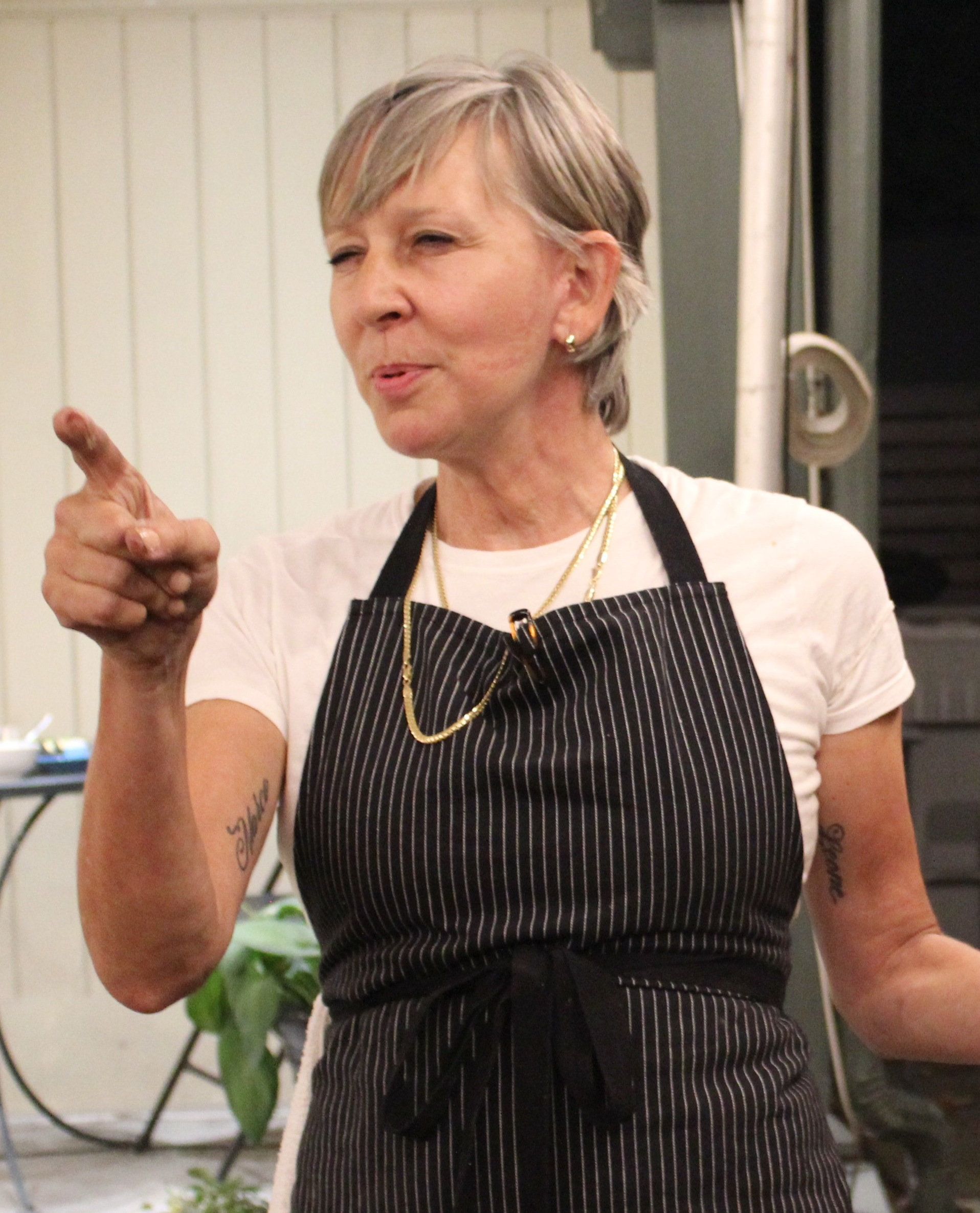
- Hamilton in 2021
- Born: 1966 (age 59–60); New Hope, PA
- Education: Hampshire College; University of Michigan (MFA)
- Spouses: Michele Fuortes (divorced); Ashley Merriman
- Family: Melissa Hamilton (sister)
- Culinary career
- Cooking style: American cuisine
- Previous restaurant
- Prune (closed)
- Television shows
- The Mind of a Chef; The Taste
- Award
- James Beard Foundation Awards

Gabrielle Hamilton (born 1966) is an American chef and author. She was the chef and owner of the now-closed Prune, a restaurant in the East Village in New York City, and the author of Blood, Bones, and Butter, a memoir.

== Early life and education ==
Hamilton, born in 1966, was raised in New Hope, PA. In an interview with NPR, Hamilton said her way of eating and cooking was heavily influenced by her French mother. She said her mother didn't waste food, and the family often foraged for fresh ingredients from their garden and from the forests and fields surrounding their house. Hamilton attended undergraduate at Hampshire College in Amherst, MA and received her MFA in creative writing from the University of Michigan.

== Career ==
=== Restaurant career ===
Following a career in catering, Hamilton opened the restaurant Prune in the East Village in 1999. She had no formal experience in restaurants, nor did she attend culinary school. Her 30-seat restaurant garnered widespread acclaim and admiration from diners, critics and other chefs including Anthony Bourdain and Eric Ripert. Prune earned a spot in the Bib Gourmand section of the Michelin's 2014 New York guide. Hamilton was featured in the fourth season of the PBS show The Mind of a Chef. She also appeared as a guest judge on the first season of The Taste on ABC.

During the COVID-19 pandemic, Hamilton published a piece in The New York Times discussing the closure of Prune and broader implications of the pandemic for the restaurant industry in the United States.

=== Writing ===
Hamilton authored the memoir Blood, Bones, and Butter, published in 2011, which received widespread critical acclaim. Michiko Kakutani of The New York Times called it "brilliantly written," while Anthony Bourdain described it as "simply the best memoir by a chef ever." She followed this with her cookbook Prune in 2014. Hamilton has also contributed essays and reporting to publications such as The New Yorker and The New York Times.

== Awards and honors ==
Hamilton received the James Beard award for best chef in New York City in 2011 and again in 2012 for her chef memoir, as well as winning Outstanding Chef in 2018. She also earned a James Beard award for journalism in 2015 for a piece she penned for the travel magazine Afar; entitled "Into the Vines," the article documents the wines and winemakers of Sicily, Italy.

== Personal life ==
Hamilton was married for 10 years to Michele Fuortes, an Italian-born teacher and researcher at Weill Cornell Medical College. They had two children, Marco and Leone, and later divorced. Hamilton is currently married to Ashley Merriman, who was her co-chef at Prune.

Hamilton's sister, Melissa, is also a food writer and chef. Their late father owned Hamilton's Grill Room in Lambertville, NJ.

== Bibliography ==
=== Books ===
- Hamilton, Gabrielle (2011). Blood, Bones, & Butter: The Inadvertent Education of a Reluctant Chef. New York: Random House. ISBN 978-0-8129-8088-2. OCLC 861521548.
- Hamilton, Gabrielle (2014). Prune. New York: Random House. ISBN 978-0-8129-9410-0. OCLC 883329595.
- Hamilton, Gabrielle (October 14, 2025). Next of Kin: A Memoir. Random House Publishing Group. ISBN 978-0-399-59010-8.

=== Essays, reporting, and other contributions ===
- Hamilton, Gabrielle (November 4, 2013). "Family meal". Take Out. The New Yorker. Vol. 89, no. 35. p. 71.
- Hamilton, Gabrielle (April 23, 2020). "My Restaurant Was My Life for 20 Years. Does the World Need It Anymore?". The New York Times.
