= Iron nanoparticle =

Sub-micrometer iron particles

Nanoscale iron particles are sub-micrometer particles of iron metal. Due to their high catalytic activity, permanent magnetic properties, low toxicity, and strong adsorption capacity, iron-based nanoparticles are widely utilized in drug delivery, production of magnetic tapes (e.g., camcorders and backup tapes of computers), gene therapy, and environmental remediation.

== Synthesis ==
Iron nanoparticles can be synthesized using two primary approaches: top-down and bottom-up methods.

=== Top-down methods ===
Top-down approaches create nanoparticles by breaking down larger bulk materials into smaller particles, including laser ablation and mechanical grinding.

=== Bottom-up methods ===
Bottom-up approaches involve the chemical and biological synthesis of iron nanoparticles from metal precursors (e.g., Fe(II) and Fe(III)). This method is widely regarded as the most effective and commonly used strategy for nanoparticle preparation. For example, iron nanoparticles can be chemically prepared by reducing Fe(II) or Fe(III) salts with sodium borohydride in an aqueous medium. This process can be described by the following equations:

4 Fe^{3+} + 3 BH_{4}^{−} + 9 H_{2}O → 4 Fe^{0}↓ + 12 H^{+} + 6 H_{2} + 3 H_{2}BO^{−}

1

4 Fe^{2+} + 3 BH_{4}^{−} + 9 H_{2}O → 4 Fe^{0}↓ + 8 H^{+} + 8 H_{2} + 3 H_{2}BO^{−}

2

== Properties ==
Iron nanoparticles are prone to oxidation when exposed to air and water. This redox process can occur under both acidic and neutral/basic conditions:

2 Fe^{0} + 4 H^{+} + O_{2} → 2 Fe^{2+} + 2 H_{2}O

3

Fe^{0} + 2 H_{2}O → Fe^{2+} + H_{2} + 2 OH^{−}

4

== Application in biomedicine ==
Iron oxide nanoparticles (IONPs) have widely investigated for applications in biomedicine, including magnetic resonance imaging and cancer therapy via magnetic hyperthermia

In addition to these applications, IONPs exhibit strong antibacterial activity and have been explored for drug and viral vector delivery to target cells. Known microorganisms susceptible to the toxic effects of IONPs include Gram-negative bacteria (e.g., Escherichia coli and Klebsiella sp.) and Gram-positive bacteria (e.g., Bacillus sp. and Corynebacterium sp.).

The antibacterial activity of IONPs is primarily attributed to the generation of reactive oxygen species (ROS), a mechanism similar to the Fenton reaction. Specifically, Fe^{2+} ions react with hydrogen peroxide (H_{2}O_{2}), producing Fe^{3+} ions and hydroxyl radical. These highly reactive species induce oxidative damage to bacterial DNA, ultimately leading to cell death.

== See also ==
- Health and safety hazards of nanomaterials
- Environmental implications of nanotechnology
