= Anthony Myint =

American chef and restaurateur (born 1978)

Anthony Eric Myint (born May 5, 1978, Falls Church, Virginia) is an American chef, author, and restaurateur based in San Francisco, California.

Myint is co-founder of several San Francisco restaurants, including Mission Chinese Food, The Perennial, Mission Cantina, Mission Burger, Lt. Waffle, and Commonwealth Restaurant.

== Early life ==
Myint was raised in Annandale, Virginia, by parents who had immigrated from Myanmar. He attended Thomas Jefferson High School for Science and Technology in Fairfax County, Virginia. He later graduated from Carleton College with majors in economics and Asian studies.

== Culinary career ==
Myint moved to San Francisco in 2004 and worked as a line cook at Bar Tartine before founding Mission Street Food, a food truck enterprise. He launched Mission Chinese Food inside Lung Shan restaurant in July 2010.

In August 2010, Myint co-founded Commonwealth Restaurant, a charitable fine-dining venture in San Francisco. Mission Chinese Food expanded to New York's Lower East Side in February 2012.

Myint opened Mission Bowling Club in early 2012, reviving his Mission Burger recipe at a bowling alley concept.

In January 2016, Myint and co-founder Karen Leibowitz opened The Perennial, a restaurant focused on environmental sustainability, featuring produce from Zero Foodprint initiatives.

== Culinary accolades ==
Myint was named one of the "Chow 13" most influential people in food by Chow.com in 2010. Eater SF selected him as its Empire Builder of the Year for San Francisco in 2011. Food & Wine magazine included him among its "40 Big Food Thinkers Under 40" for 2010.

SF Weekly named Myint its Charitable Chef of the Year in 2009. 7x7 magazine featured him in its "Hot 20" restaurants list for 2011.

With Karen Leibowitz, Myint co-authored Mission Street Food: Recipes and Ideas from an Improbable Restaurant, published by McSweeney's in 2011. The New York Times named it a Notable Cookbook of 2011.
