= The Mind of a Chef =

- Genre: Cooking
- Country of origin: United States
- Original language: English
- No. of seasons: 6
- No. of episodes: 86

Production
- Executive producers: Anthony Bourdain; Joe Caterini; Christopher Collins; Lydia Tenaglia; Michael Steed
- Producers: Jonathan Cianfrani (season 2 & 4); Nari Kye (season 4); Gillian Brown (season 5); Alexandra Chaden (season 3 & 6)
- Running time: 23 minutes (seasons 1–5); 23–25 minutes (season 6)
- Production company: Zero Point Zero Production

Original release
- Network: PBS (2012–17); Facebook Watch (2017)
- Release: November 9, 2012 – December 18, 2017

The Mind of a Chef is a non-fiction television series on PBS narrated and executive produced by Anthony Bourdain, and combines travel, cooking, history, and science. Each season follows a different chef, or pair of chefs, and examines their beliefs and philosophies on cooking and the culinary arts.

The first season premiered on November 9, 2012, with host David Chang. Season 2 premiered on September 7, 2013, and starred chefs Sean Brock and April Bloomfield. Season 3 premiered on September 6, 2014, and stars chefs Edward Lee and Magnus Nilsson. Chefs Gabrielle Hamilton and David Kinch were featured in Season 4. Season 5 featured chef Ludo Lefebvre.

In 2017, Zero Point Zero Production released the sixth season, featuring chef Danny Bowien, on Facebook Watch. It premiered on November 13, 2017.

== Episodes ==
Season	Episodes	Originally released		
Season	Episodes	First released	Last released	Network
1	16	November 9, 2012	December 7, 2012	PBS
2	16	September 7, 2013	December 21, 2013	PBS
3	16	September 6, 2014	December 20, 2014	PBS
4	16	September 5, 2015	December 19, 2015	PBS
5	14	October 1, 2016	January 13, 2017	PBS
6	8	November 13, 2017	December 18, 2017	Facebook Watch

=== Season 1 (2012) ===
No. overall	No. in season	Title	Starring	Original release date
1	1	"Noodle"	David Chang	November 9, 2012
2	2	"Pig"	David Chang	November 9, 2012
3	3	"Memory"	David Chang	November 9, 2012
4	4	"Spain"	David Chang	November 9, 2012
5	5	"Rotten"	David Chang	November 16, 2012
6	6	"Rene"	David Chang	November 16, 2012
7	7	"Simple"	David Chang	November 23, 2012
8	8	"Gluttony"	David Chang	November 23, 2012
9	9	"Chef"	David Chang	November 23, 2012
10	10	"Japan"	David Chang	November 23, 2012
11	11	"New York"	David Chang	November 30, 2012
12	12	"Fresh"	David Chang	November 30, 2012
13	13	"Soy"	David Chang	November 30, 2012
14	14	"Sweet Spot"	David Chang	November 30, 2012
15	15	"Smoke"	David Chang	December 7, 2012
16	16	"Buddies"	David Chang	December 7, 2012

=== Season 2 (2013) ===
No. overall	No. in season	Title	Directed by	Starring	Original release date
17	1	"Southerners"	Michael Steed & Claudia Woloshin	Sean Brock	September 7, 2013
18	2	"Seeds"	Michael Steed & Claudia Woloshin	Sean Brock	September 14, 2013
19	3	"Rice"	Michael Steed & Claudia Woloshin	Sean Brock	September 21, 2013
20	4	"Louisiana"	Michael Steed & Claudia Woloshin	Sean Brock	September 28, 2013
21	5	"Preserve"	Michael Steed & Claudia Woloshin	Sean Brock	October 5, 2013
22	6	"Roots"	Michael Steed & Claudia Woloshin	Sean Brock	October 12, 2013
23	7	"Lowcountry BBQ"	Michael Steed & Claudia Woloshin	Sean Brock	October 19, 2013
24	8	"Senegal"	Michael Steed & Claudia Woloshin	Sean Brock	October 26, 2013
25	9	"London"	Michael Steed & Claudia Woloshin	April Bloomfield	November 2, 2013
26	10	"Sea/Salt"	Michael Steed & Claudia Woloshin	April Bloomfield	November 9, 2013
27	11	"Curry"	Michael Steed & Claudia Woloshin	April Bloomfield	November 16, 2013
28	12	"Italian"	Michael Steed & Claudia Woloshin	April Bloomfield	November 23, 2013
29	13	"British Classics"	Michael Steed & Claudia Woloshin	April Bloomfield	November 30, 2013
30	14	"Farmer"	Michael Steed & Claudia Woloshin	April Bloomfield	December 7, 2013
31	15	"Leftovers"	Michael Steed & Claudia Woloshin	April Bloomfield	December 14, 2013
32	16	"Restaurateur"	Michael Steed & Claudia Woloshin	April Bloomfield	December 21, 2013

=== Season 3 (2014) ===
No. overall	No. in season	Title	Directed by	Starring	Original release date
33	1	"Origin"	Anna Chai & Michael Steed	Edward Lee	September 6, 2014
34	2	"American"	Anna Chai & Michael Steed	Edward Lee	September 13, 2014
35	3	"Argentina"	Anna Chai & Michael Steed	Edward Lee	September 20, 2014
36	4	"Louisville"	Anna Chai & Michael Steed	Edward Lee	September 27, 2014
37	5	"Kentucky"	Anna Chai & Michael Steed	Edward Lee	October 4, 2014
38	6	"Latitude"	Anna Chai & Michael Steed	Edward Lee	October 11, 2014
39	7	"Impermanence"	Anna Chai & Michael Steed	Edward Lee	October 18, 2014
40	8	"Bourbon"	Anna Chai & Michael Steed	Edward Lee	October 25, 2014
41	9	"Winter"	Anna Chai & Michael Steed	Magnus Nilsson	November 1, 2014
42	10	"Spring"	Anna Chai & Michael Steed	Magnus Nilsson	November 8, 2014
43	11	"Creation"	Anna Chai & Michael Steed	Magnus Nilsson	November 15, 2014
44	12	"France"	Anna Chai & Michael Steed	Magnus Nilsson	November 22, 2014
45	13	"Traditions"	Anna Chai & Michael Steed	Magnus Nilsson	November 29, 2014
46	14	"Locality"	Anna Chai & Michael Steed	Magnus Nilsson	December 6, 2014
47	15	"Documentation"	Anna Chai & Michael Steed	Magnus Nilsson	December 13, 2014
48	16	"Fäviken"	Anna Chai & Michael Steed	Magnus Nilsson	December 20, 2014

=== Season 4 (2015) ===
No. overall	No. in season	Title	Directed by	Starring	Original release date
49	1	"Prune"	Siobhan Walshe	Gabrielle Hamilton	September 5, 2015
50	2	"Garbage"	Siobhan Walshe	Gabrielle Hamilton	September 12, 2015
51	3	"Rome"	Siobhan Walshe	Gabrielle Hamilton	September 19, 2015
52	4	"Hunger"	Siobhan Walshe	Gabrielle Hamilton	September 26, 2015
53	5	"Past"	Siobhan Walshe	Gabrielle Hamilton	October 3, 2015
54	6	"Hustle"	Siobhan Walshe	Gabrielle Hamilton	October 10, 2015
55	7	"Napkin"	Siobhan Walshe	Gabrielle Hamilton	October 17, 2015
56	8	"Evolution"	Siobhan Walshe	Gabrielle Hamilton	October 24, 2015
57	9	"Fire"	Anna Chai	David Kinch	October 31, 2015
58	10	"Legacy"	Anna Chai	David Kinch	November 7, 2015
59	11	"Ocean"	Anna Chai	David Kinch	November 14, 2015
60	12	"Strawberry"	Anna Chai	David Kinch	November 21, 2015
61	13	"Balance"	Anna Chai	David Kinch	November 28, 2015
62	14	"Restrictions"	Anna Chai	David Kinch	December 5, 2015
63	15	"New Orleans"	Anna Chai	David Kinch	December 12, 2015
64	16	"25 Bites"	Anna Chai	David Kinch	December 19, 2015

=== Season 5 (2016–17) ===
No. overall	No. in season	Title	Directed by	Starring	Original release date
65	1	"Best Of: Eggs"	Morgan Fallon	Various	October 1, 2016
66	2	"Legends"	Morgan Fallon	Various	October 8, 2016
67	3	"Fried"	Morgan Fallon	Various	October 15, 2016
68	4	"LudoBird"	Morgan Fallon	Ludo Lefebvre	October 22, 2016
69	5	"Strip Malls"	Morgan Fallon	Ludo Lefebvre	October 29, 2016
70	6	"La Mer"	Morgan Fallon	Ludo Lefebvre	November 5, 2016
71	7	"Le Végétale"	Morgan Fallon	Ludo Lefebvre	November 12, 2016
72	8	"Joie De Vivre"	Morgan Fallon	Ludo Lefebvre	November 19, 2016
73	9	"Tous Au Bistro"	Morgan Fallon	Ludo Lefebvre	November 26, 2016
74	10	"Instinct vs. Discipline"	Morgan Fallon	Ludo Lefebvre	December 4, 2016
75	11	"LudoBites"	Morgan Fallon	Ludo Lefebvre	December 11, 2016
76	12	"Surf N Turf"	Morgan Fallon	Various	January 14, 2017
77	13	"Dessert"	Morgan Fallon	Various	January 6, 2017
78	14	"Birds"	Morgan Fallon	Various	January 13, 2017

=== Season 6 (2017) ===
No. overall	No. in season	Title	Directed by	Starring	Original release date
79	1	"Genesis"	Alex Braverman	Danny Bowien	November 13, 2017
80	2	"Threshold"	Alex Braverman	Danny Bowien	November 13, 2017
81	3	"Mentor"	Alex Braverman	Danny Bowien	November 13, 2017
82	4	"Family"	Alex Braverman	Danny Bowien	November 20, 2017
83	5	"Risk"	Alex Braverman	Danny Bowien	November 27, 2017
84	6	"Unexpected"	Alex Braverman	Danny Bowien	December 4, 2017
85	7	"Classics"	Alex Braverman	Danny Bowien	December 11, 2017
86	8	"Multiverse"	Alex Braverman	Danny Bowien	December 18, 2017

== Reception ==
=== Awards and nominations ===
In 2013 & 2014, The Mind of a Chef won a James Beard Foundation Award for Best Television Program, On Location.

Year	Ceremony	Category	Recipient(s)	Result	Ref.
2014	41st Daytime Emmy Awards	Outstanding Culinary Program	The Mind of a Chef	Won	
2018	45th Daytime Emmy Awards	Outstanding Culinary Program	The Mind of a Chef	Nominated	
2018	45th Daytime Emmy Awards	Outstanding Culinary Host	Danny Bowien	Nominated	
2018	45th Daytime Emmy Awards	Outstanding Directing in a Single Camera Lifestyle/Culinary/Travel or Educational and Informational Program	The Mind of a Chef	Nominated	

== See also ==
- List of original programs distributed by Facebook Watch
