= Daytime Emmy Award for Outstanding Lifestyle/Culinary Show Host =

Annual television award

Beginning in 2013, The Daytime Emmy Awards currently give out two awards to honor hosts of culinary and lifestyle etc. programming. The categories are Outstanding Culinary Host and Outstanding Daytime Program Host. The category originated in 1994 and was known as the Outstanding Service Host. Prior to that, hosts of service and craft shows would compete in the Outstanding Talk Show Host category. In 2007, the category name was changed to Outstanding Lifestyle Host and was changed again in 2009 to Outstanding Lifestyle/Culinary Host.

== Winners ==
=== Outstanding Service Show Host (1994–2006) ===
- 1994: T. Berry Brazelton, What Every Baby Knows
- 1995: Martha Stewart, Martha Stewart Living
- 1996: Julia Child, It's Julia's Kitchen with Master Chefs
- 1997: Martha Stewart, Martha Stewart Living
- 1998: Steve Thomas, This Old House
- 1999: Ming Tsai, East Meets West with Ming Tsai
- 2000: Christopher Lowell, It's Christopher Lowell
- 2001: Julia Child and Jacques Pépin, Julia and Jacques Cooking at Home
- 2002: Martha Stewart, Martha Stewart Living
- 2003: Martha Stewart, Martha Stewart Living
- 2004: Suze Orman, The Suze Orman Show
- 2005: Bobby Flay, Boy Meets Grill and Michael Chiarello, Easy Entertaining with Michael Chiarello (tie)
- 2006: Suze Orman, The Suze Orman Show

=== Outstanding Lifestyle Host (2007–2008) ===
- 2007: Paula Deen, Paula's Home Cooking
- 2008: Giada De Laurentiis, Everyday Italian

=== Outstanding Lifestyle/Culinary Host (2009–2012) ===
- 2009: Ina Garten, Barefoot Contessa
- 2010: Ina Garten, Barefoot Contessa
- 2011: Martha Stewart, Martha
- 2012: Sandra Lee, Semi-Homemade Cooking with Sandra Lee

=== Outstanding Culinary Host (2013–) ===
- 2013: Lidia Bastianich, Lidia's Italy
- 2014: Bobby Flay, Bobby Flay's Barbecue Addiction: Season 3
- 2015: Bobby Flay, Bobby Flay's Barbecue Addiction: Season 4
- 2016: Gabrielle Hamilton and David Kinch, The Mind of a Chef
- 2017: Ina Garten, Barefoot Contessa
- 2018: Lidia Bastianich, Lidia's Kitchen
- 2019: Valerie Bertinelli, Valerie's Home Cooking
- 2020: Giada De Laurentiis, Giada Entertains
- 2021: Ina Garten, Barefoot Contessa
- 2022: Frankie Celenza, Struggle Meals
- 2023: Justin Sutherland, Taste the Culture
- 2024: Buddy Valastro, Legends of the Fork
- 2025: Kardea Brown, Delicious Miss Brown
- 2026: Ina Garten, Be My Guest with Ina Garten: Season 6

=== Outstanding Host in a Lifestyle/Travel Program (2013–2014) ===
- 2013: Leeza Gibbons, My Generation
- 2014: Joseph Rosendo, Joseph Rosendo’s Travelscope

=== Outstanding Lifestyle/Travel/Children's Series Host (2015–2016) ===
- 2015: Brandon McMillan, Lucky Dog
- 2016: Jeff Corwin, Ocean Mysteries with Jeff Corwin

=== Outstanding Host in a Lifestyle/Travel/Children's or Family Viewing Program (2017–2018) ===
- 2017: Joseph Rosendo, Joseph Rosendo’s Travelscope
- 2018: Brandon McMillan, Lucky Dog

=== Outstanding Host for a Lifestyle, Children's or Special Class Program (2019) ===
- 2019: Samantha Brown, Samantha Brown's Places to Love: Season 1

=== Outstanding Daytime Program Host (2020–2023) ===
- 2020: Mike Rowe, Returning the Favor
- 2021: Zac Efron, Down to Earth with Zac Efron: Season 1
- 2022: Bear Grylls, You vs. Wild: Out Cold
- 2023: Mike Corey, Uncharted Adventure

=== Outstanding Daytime Personality – Daily (2024–) ===
- 2024: Matt Cohen, Cassie DiLaura, Denny Directo, Kevin Frazier, Will Marfuggi, Rachel Smith, Nischelle Turner, Entertainment Tonight
- 2025: Cassie DiLaura, Denny Directo, Kevin Frazier, Rachel Smith, Nischelle Turner – Entertainment Tonight
- 2026: Star Jones and Corey Jovan, Divorce Court

=== Outstanding Daytime Personality – Non-Daily (2024–) ===
- 2024: Christian Cooper, Extraordinary Birder with Christian Cooper
- 2025: Sir David Attenborough, Secret Lives of Orangutans
- 2026: Giada De Laurentiis, Giada in My Kitchen

== Multiple wins ==
5 wins

- Ina Garten
- Martha Stewart

3 wins

- Bobby Flay
- Giada De Laurentiis

2 wins

- Joseph Rosendo
- Julia Child
- Lidia Bastianich
- Brandon McMillan
- Suze Orman
