= 1970 in television =

The year 1970 in television involved some significant events. Below is a list of notable television-related events in that year.

== Events ==
- January 1 – WXTV becomes a full time Spanish-language station based in Paterson, New Jersey, which it remains into the 21st century. It becomes an affiliate of SIN, the network's first affiliate east of the Mississippi River.
- January 3 – Jon Pertwee makes his first appearance as the Third Doctor in the Doctor Who serial Spearhead from Space. It also marks the first time that the series is broadcast in colour.
- January 19 – CBS in the United States launches Operation 100, a plan to beat NBC's ratings in the last 100 days of the season, using the slogan "The man can't bust our network."
- February 7 – The Hollywood Palace variety series airs its 192nd and final hour-long episode on ABC, with Bing Crosby in his 31st appearance as guest host.
- March 7 – The "eclipse of the century" is covered by all three American networks.
- March 16 – The FCC's "Miami channel 10 case" comes to a definite end as the station becomes WPLG.
- March 26 – The first privately owned television station in Thailand, Channel 3, opens in Bangkok.
- April 1 – President Richard Nixon signs the Public Health Cigarette Smoking Act into law, banning cigarette television advertisements in the United States, starting on January 1, 1971.
- April 6 - The Action News format makes its debut on WFIL-TV (later WPVI-TV, an ABC O&O).
- May 31 – WAPI-TV 13 in Birmingham, Alabama, ends nine years of dual affiliation with NBC and CBS, becoming an exclusive affiliate of NBC, and WBMG 42 in Birmingham, WCFT-33 in Tuscaloosa and WHMA-40 in Anniston affiliate exclusively with CBS. Previously, Channels 33, 40 and 42 aired programming from NBC and CBS that was not aired on Channel 13.
- July 31 – Chet Huntley anchors his final newscast with David Brinkley and retires, bringing down the curtain on a 14-year career at NBC News in the United States and, thus, as chief anchor of The Huntley–Brinkley Report. The next Monday, August 3, the program is renamed NBC Nightly News, the title it retains for at least 40 years.
- August 2 – NBC expands full-service newscasts to seven nights a week with NBC Sunday News; it replaces The Frank McGee Report.
- September 7 – Independent Television of Vietnam, as predecessor of Vietnam Television, begins broadcasts Hanoi, Vietnam.
- October 5 – The Public Broadcasting Service (PBS) in the United States begins broadcasting and National Educational Television is shut down.
- December 25 – Pluto's Christmas Tree is broadcast on BBC1 in the United Kingdom, the first complete Mickey Mouse cartoon to be shown on television in colour. By contrast, the Colour Strike by technicians causes ITV Christmas programmes this year to air in black & white.
- In a cliffhanger on the American soap opera Search for Tomorrow, businessman Sam Reynolds is believed to be dead after perishing in Africa. One of the first "exotic" deaths for a soap opera character, it is in tune with actor Robert Mandan's wish to leave the show.
- "Country" comedian and Grand Ole Opry star Minnie Pearl makes her first appearance on Hee Haw.
- Lloyd Robertson replaces Warren Davis as anchor of CBC Television's The National.

== Programs/programmes ==
- 60 Minutes (1968–present)
- American Bandstand (1952–1989)
- Another World (1964–1999)
- As the World Turns (1956–2010)
- Bewitched (1964–1972)
- Blue Peter (UK) (1958–present)
- Bonanza (1959–1973)
- Bozo the Clown (1949–present)
- Bright Promise (1969–1972)
- Candid Camera (1948–present)
- Captain Kangaroo (1955–1984)
- Clangers (UK) (1969–1972)
- Come Dancing (UK) (1949–1995)
- Coronation Street (1960–present)
- Crossroads (UK) (1964–1988, 2001–2003)
- Dad's Army (UK) (1968–1977)
- Dark Shadows (1966–1971)
- Days of Our Lives (1965–present)
- Dixon of Dock Green (UK) (1955–1976)
- Doctor Who (UK) (1963–1989, 1996, 2005–present)
- Face the Nation (1954–present)
- Family Affair (1966–1971)
- Four Corners (Australia) (1961–present)
- General Hospital (1963–present)
- Grandstand (UK) (1958–2007)
- Green Acres (1965–1971)
- Gunsmoke (1955–1975)
- Hallmark Hall of Fame (1951–present)
- Hawaii Five-O (1968–1980)
- Hee Haw (1969–1993)
- Here's Lucy (1968–1974)
- Hogan's Heroes (1965–1971)
- Ironside (1967–1975)
- It's Academic (1961–present)
- Jeopardy! (1964–1975, 1984–present)
- Julia (1968–1971)
- Kimba the White Lion (1966–1967), re-runs
- Laugh-In (1968–1973)
- Love is a Many Splendored Thing (1967–1973)
- Love of Life (1951–1980)
- Love, American Style (1969–1974)
- Magpie (UK) (1968–1980)
- Mannix (1967–1975)
- Marcus Welby, M.D. (1969–1976)
- Mayberry R.F.D. (1968–1971)
- Meet the Press (1947–present)
- Mission: Impossible (1966–1973)
- Monty Python's Flying Circus (UK) (1969–1974)
- My Three Sons (1960–1972)
- One Life to Live (1968–2012)
- Opportunity Knocks (UK) (1956–1978)
- Panorama (UK) (1953–present)
- Play School (1966–present)
- Room 222 (1969–1974)
- Search for Tomorrow (1951–1986)
- Sesame Street (1969–present)
- Soul Train (1971-2006)
- That Girl (1966–1971)
- The Andy Williams Show (1962-1971)
- The Benny Hill Show (UK) (1969–1989)
- The Beverly Hillbillies (1962–1971)
- The Brady Bunch (1969–1974)
- The Carol Burnett Show (1967–1978)
- The Dean Martin Show (1965–1974)
- The Doctors (1963–1982)
- The Doris Day Show (1968–1973)
- The Ed Sullivan Show (1948–1971)
- The Edge of Night (1956–1984)
- The Goodies (UK) (1970-1982)
- The Good Old Days (UK) (1953–1983)
- The Guiding Light (1952–2009)
- The Johnny Cash Show (1969–1971)
- The Late Late Show (Ireland) (1962–present)
- The Lawrence Welk Show (1955–1982)
- The Mike Douglas Show (1961–1981)
- The Mod Squad (1968–1973)
- The Money Programme (UK) (1966–present)
- The Newlywed Game (1966–1974)
- The Secret Storm (1954–1974)
- The Sky at Night (UK) (1957–present)
- The Today Show (1952–present)
- The Tonight Show Starring Johnny Carson (1962–1992)
- The Wonderful World of Disney (1969–1979)
- This Is Your Life (UK) (1955–2003)
- Tom and Jerry (1965–1972, 1975–1977, 1980–1982)
- Top of the Pops (UK) (1964–2006)
- Truth or Consequences (1950–1988)
- What the Papers Say (UK) (1956–present)
- Where the Heart Is (1969–1973)
- World of Sport (1965–1985)
- Z-Cars (UK) (1962–1978)

=== Debuts ===
- January 5 – Soap opera All My Children on ABC (–2011)
- January 6 – Kate on ITV (–1972)
- January 30 – The Tim Conway Show on CBS (ending June 19)
- February 17 – McCloud pilot on NBC (–1977); The series becomes a regular show the following fall as part of Four in One
- March 30 – Soap opera Somerset on NBC (–1976), while fellow soaps A World Apart (1970–1971) and The Best of Everything (1970) debut on ABC (It marks the last time multiple soaps premiere on the same day in the US)
- September 12 – Josie and the Pussycats, on CBS Saturday morning (–1974)
- September 16 – UFO on ITV (–1971)
- September 17 – The Flip Wilson Show (–1974) and Nancy (–1971) on NBC
- September 18 - Headmaster (-1971) on CBS
- September 19 – Arnie (–1972) and The Mary Tyler Moore Show (–1977) both on CBS
- September 20 – The Tim Conway Comedy Hour on CBS (ending December 13)
- September 21 – NFL Monday Night Football on ABC (it moved to ESPN in 2006)
- September 24 – The Odd Couple (–1975) and Barefoot in the Park (–1971) both on ABC
- September 25
  - The Partridge Family on ABC (–1974)
  - Adventures in Rainbow Country on CBC (–1971)
  - Doomwatch on BBC1 (–1972)
  - Party Game (–1980)
  - Play for Today supersedes The Wednesday Play on BBC1; the anthology drama series lasts until 1984
- November – Mr Benn on BBC in syndication
- November 8 - The Goodies on BBC2
- December – I racconti di padre Brown on RAI (–February 1971)

=== Ending this year ===
Date	Show	Debut
April 3	The Flying Nun	1967
April 3	Here Come the Brides	1968
April 4	Petticoat Junction	1963
May 7	Daniel Boone	1964
May 15	Get Smart	1965
May 26	I Dream of Jeannie	1965
May 27	The Wednesday Play	1964
June 14	Spider-Man	1967
June 19	The Tim Conway Show	1970
October 31	Scooby-Doo, Where Are You! (returned in 1978)	1969
December 13	The Tim Conway Comedy Hour	1970
December 19	H.R. Puffnstuff (Returned in 1971)	1969

== Births ==
Date	Name	Notability
January 1	Jeff Schaffer	Writer
January 2	Nancy St. Alban	Actress (Guiding Light)
January 6	Julie Chen Moonves	TV host
January 13	Shonda Rhimes	Producer and showrunner (Grey's Anatomy)
January 15	Shane McMahon	Businessman and pro wrestler (WWE)
January 20	Skeet Ulrich	Actor (Jericho)
January 21	Ken Leung	Actor (Lost, The Night Shift)
January 26	Tracy Middendorf	Actress (Scream)
January 27	Peter W. Klein	Writer
January 29	Heather Graham	Actress (Scrubs)
January 29	Janice Kawaye	Voice actress (My Life as a Teenage Robot, Hi Hi Puffy AmiYumi)
January 29	Paul Ryan	Politician
January 30	Chris Jacobs	Television host
January 31	Minnie Driver	English actress (Speechless)
February 2	Jennifer Westfeldt	American actress
February 4	Gabrielle Anwar	English actress (The Tudors, Burn Notice, Once Upon a Time)
February 8	Alonzo Mourning	NBA basketball player
February 10	Tyler Bunch	Actor
February 15	Megan Dodds	Actress (CSI: NY, House)
February 17	Dominic Purcell	Australian-British actor (Prison Break, The Flash, Legends of Tomorrow)
February 19	Bellamy Young	Actress (Scandal)
February 22	Michael Rodrick	Actor (Another World)
February 23	Paul Anthony Stewart	Actor (Guiding Light)
February 23	Niecy Nash	Actress
February 28	Tangi Miller	Actress (Felicity)
March 2	Alexander Armstrong	TV presenter
March 3	Julie Bowen	Actress (Ed, Boston Legal, Modern Family)
March 3	Audrey Puente	American meteorologist
March 4	Andrea Bendewald	Actress (Suddenly Susan)
March 4	Christopher B. Duncan	Actor (The Jamie Foxx Show, The First Family)
March 5	Lisa Robin Kelly	Actress (That '70s Show) (died 2013)
March 7	Rachel Weisz	Actress
March 8	Andrea Parker	Actress (The Pretender, Less than Perfect, Pretty Little Liars)
March 10	Jim Sciutto	News anchor
March 17	Yanic Truesdale	Canadian-American actor (Gilmore Girls)
March 18	Queen Latifah	Actress, talk show host (The Queen Latifah Show)
March 20	Michael Rapaport	Actor (Prison Break)
March 24	Lara Flynn Boyle	Actress (Twin Peaks, The Practice)
March 24	Jeff Lewis	TV host
March 27	Elizabeth Mitchell	Actress (Lost, V, Revolution)
March 28	Vince Vaughn	Actor and producer
April 4	Greg Garcia	Producer
April 5	Wendy Braun	Actress (Lost)
April 11	Johnny Messner	Actor
April 12	Retta	Actress and comedian (Parks and Recreation)
April 13	Ricky Schroder	Actor (Silver Spoons, NYPD Blue)
April 15	Flex Alexander	Actor (Girlfriends, One on One)
April 20	Shemar Moore	Actor (The Young and the Restless, Criminal Minds)
April 21	Rob Riggle	Actor and comedian (Saturday Night Live)
April 21	Nicole Sullivan	Actress and comedian (Mad TV, Kim Possible, The Secret Saturdays)
April 25	Jason Lee	Actor (Earl Hickey on My Name is Earl)
April 25	Jason Wiles	Actor (Third Watch, Scream)
April 26	Melania Trump	Businesswoman
April 26	Jacqueline Laurita	American television personality
April 29	Uma Thurman	Actress and singer
May 3	Bobby Cannavale	Actor (Third Watch)
May 4	Will Arnett	Actor (Arrested Development, 30 Rock)
May 11	Karen Kilgariff	Actress
May 11	Harold Ford Jr.	American financial managing director
May 12	Samantha Mathis	Actress
May 17	Jordan Knight	Singer (The Surreal Life: Fame Games)
May 18	Tina Fey	Actress and comedian (Saturday Night Live, 30 Rock)
May 19	Jason Gray-Stanford	Canadian actor (Monk)
May 22	Naomi Campbell	English model, actress and singer (Empire)
May 27	Mara Brock Akil	American screenwriter and television producer
May 27	Joseph Fiennes	American actor
May 28	Paul Sinha	English quizzer, comedian, doctor and award-winning broadcaster
June 1	Paul Schrier	Actor
June 2	Paula Cale	Actress (Providence)
June 8	Gabby Giffords	American retired politician and gun control advocate
June 8	Kelli Williams	Actress (The Practice, Army Wives, Lie to Me)
June 12	Rick Hoffman	Actor
June 15	Leah Remini	Actress (The King of Queens, Kevin Can Wait)
June 15	Kit Pongetti	Actress
June 16	Darlene Rodriguez	American journalist
June 16	Clifton Collins Jr.	American actor
June 17	Will Forte	Actor and comedian (Saturday Night Live, The Last Man on Earth)
June 19	Chris Wragge	American news anchor
June 26	Chris O'Donnell	Actor (Grey's Anatomy, The Company, NCIS: Los Angeles)
June 26	Sean Hayes	Actor, comedian and producer (Will & Grace)
June 26	Nick Offerman	Actor (Parks and Recreation)
June 26	Matt Letscher	Actor
June 28	Steve Burton	Actor (General Hospital, The Young and the Restless)
June 28	Rio Hackford	Actor (died 2022)
June 30	Brian Bloom	Actor
July 1	Henry Simmons	Actor (NYPD Blue, Agents of S.H.I.E.L.D.)
July 3	Audra McDonald	Actress (Private Practice) and singer
July 11	Justin Chambers	Actor (Cold Case, Grey's Anatomy)
July 13	Sharon Horgan	English-born Irish comedy screenwriter and actress (Pulling, Catastrophe, Divorce)
July 23	Charisma Carpenter	Actress (Buffy the Vampire Slayer, Angel)
July 26	Cress Williams	Actor (Prison Break, Hart of Dixie)
July 27	Nikolaj Coster-Waldau	Actor
July 30	Dean Edwards	Actor and comedian (Saturday Night Live, Celebrity Deathmatch, The Sopranos)
July 30	Christopher Nolan	Director
July 30	Andrea Stassou	American television journalist
August 2	Kevin Smith	Actor
August 4	Bret Baier	Host
August 6	M. Night Shyamalan	Actor
August 9	Thomas Lennon	Actor (The State, Reno 911!)
August 9	Chris Cuomo	Reporter
August 11	Teresa Pavlinek	Actress
August 12	Charles Mesure	English-Australian actor
August 15	Anthony Anderson	Actor (All About the Andersons, Black-ish)
August 15	Ben Silverman	American media executive
August 16	Seth Peterson	Actor (Providence, Burn Notice)
August 16	Bonnie Bernstein	Sportscaster
August 18	Malcolm-Jamal Warner	Actor (The Cosby Show, Malcolm & Eddie) (died 2025)
August 19	Fat Joe	Rapper and actor
August 22	Giada De Laurentiis	Television personality and chef (Everyday Italian, Giada at Home)
August 23	Jay Mohr	Actor and comedian (Ghost Whisperer, Gary Unmarried)
August 23	River Phoenix	Actor (Seven Brides for Seven Brothers) (died 1993)
August 24	David Gregory	American television personality
August 26	Melissa McCarthy	Actress and comedian (Gilmore Girls, Mike & Molly)
August 27	Leanna Creel	Actress (Saved by the Bell)
August 31	Debbie Gibson	Singer (Celebrity Apprentice)
September 3	Maria Bamford	Actress and comedian (CatDog, Back at the Barnyard, Kick Buttowski: Suburban Daredevil, Adventure Time, Lady Dynamite)
September 6	Emily Maitlis	Canadian-born English news presenter (NBC, BBC)
September 8	Rosearik Rikki Simons	Voice actor (Invader Zim)
September 8	Latrell Sprewell	NBA basketball player
September 11	Taraji P. Henson	Actress (Empire)
September 11	Laura Wright	Actress (Guiding Light, General Hospital)
September 12	Josh Hopkins	Actor (Cougar Town)
September 12	Will Chase	Actor
September 13	Louise Lombard	English actress (CSI: Crime Scene Investigation)
September 16	Tamron Hall	Journalist and talk show host
September 18	Aisha Tyler	Actress (Criminal Minds, Ghost Whisperer, Archer)
September 19	Victor Williams	Actor (The King of Queens)
September 21	Rob Benedict	Actor (Supernatural)
September 21	James Lesure	Actor (For Your Love, Las Vegas)
September 27	Tamara Taylor	Actress (Bones)
September 29	Emily Lloyd	Actress
September 29	Russell Peters	Actor
September 30	Tony Hale	Actor (Arrested Development)
October 2	Kelly Ripa	Actress, talk show host (All My Children, Hope & Faith)
October 2	Mark Immelman	Sportscaster
October 3	Kirsten Nelson	Actress (Psych)
October 5	Josie Bissett	Actress (Melrose Place)
October 6	Amy Jo Johnson	American-Canadian actress (Mighty Morphin Power Rangers, Felicity, Flashpoint) and singer
October 8	Matt Damon	Actor (30 Rock)
October 11	Constance Zimmer	Actress (Entourage, Boston Legal, Agents of S.H.I.E.L.D.)
October 12	Kirk Cameron	Actor (Growing Pains)
October 13	Serena Altschul	American broadcast journalist
October 14	Jon Seda	Actor (Homicide: Life on the Street)
October 14	Paul Fitzgerald	Actor
October 18	Mike Mitchell	Director
October 19	Chris Kattan	Actor and comedian (Saturday Night Live, The Middle)
October 22	Jason Moore	Director
October 23	Grant Imahara	American electrical engineer (died 2020)
October 24	Raúl Esparza	Actor (Law & Order: Special Victims Unit, Hannibal)
October 25	Adam Goldberg	Actor
October 25	Adam Pascal	Actor
October 28	Greg Eagles	Voice actor (Grim on The Grim Adventures of Billy and Mandy)
October 30	Billy Brown	Actor (How to Get Away with Murder)
October 30	Nia Long	Actress (The Fresh Prince of Bel-Air, Third Watch)
November 1	Caprice Crane	Producer
November 4	Anthony Ruivivar	Actor (Third Watch)
November 4	Bethenny Frankel	American television personality
November 7	Morgan Spurlock	Producer
November 9	Chris Jericho	Wrestler
November 11	Jon Wertheim	Sports journalist
November 16	Martha Plimpton	Actress (Raising Hope)
November 17	Mike Epps	Actor
November 18	Megyn Kelly	Talk show host
November 20	Sabrina Lloyd	Actress (Sliders, Sports Night)
November 20	Melissa Disney	Voice actress (As Told by Ginger)
November 24	Jonathan Ward	Actor (Charles in Charge)
November 28	Richard Osman	TV presenter
November 29	Larry Joe Campbell	Actor (According to Jim)
November 30	Perrey Reeves	Actress
December 1	Golden Brooks	Actress (Girlfriends, Saturdays)
December 1	Sarah Silverman	Actress, comedian and singer (Saturday Night Live, The Sarah Silverman Program)
December 2	Joe Lo Truglio	Actor (Brooklyn Nine-Nine)
December 4	Kevin Sussman	Actor (Ugly Betty, The Big Bang Theory)
December 4	Tamsen Fadal	American journalist
December 4	Fat Pat	American rapper
December 5	Walt Dohrn	Actor
December 7	Meg Oliver	Anchor
December 9	Kara DioGuardi	Judge on American Idol
December 10	Susanna Reid	Television presenter
December 12	Jennifer Connelly	Actress (The $treet)
December 12	Mädchen Amick	Actress (Twin Peaks)
December 13	Jesse Armstrong	Screenwriter (Succession)
December 13	Evan Frankfort	Television composer
December 15	Michael Shanks	Canadian actor (Stargate SG-1, Saving Hope)
December 16	Daniel Cosgrove	Actor
December 17	Sean Patrick Thomas	Actor (The District)
December 18	Rob Van Dam	Pro wrestler
December 18	DMX	Rapper and actor (died 2021)
December 18	Victoria Pratt	Actress (Mutant X, Day Break)
December 20	Nicole de Boer	Actress (Star Trek: Deep Space Nine, The Dead Zone)
December 21	Jamie Colby	American TV host
December 23	Shannon Bream	American journalist
December 24	Amaury Nolasco	Puerto Rican actor (Prison Break)
December 28	Dolores Catania	American television personality
December 29	Kevin Weisman	Actor (Alias, The Blacklist, Scorpion)
December 31	Chandra West	Canadian actress (The Gates)

== Deaths ==
Date	Name	Age	Notability
April 23	Herb Shriner	51	Actor, game show host (Two for the Money)
April 30	Inger Stevens	35	Actress (Katy on The Farmer's Daughter)
June 11	Frank Silvera	55	Actor (The High Chaparral)
August 30	Del Moore	54	Actor, comedian (Life with Elizabeth)
September 29	Edward Everett Horton	84	Actor, narrator (The Rocky and Bullwinkle Show)

== See also ==
- 1970–71 United States network television schedule
