= Kardea Brown =

American chef and TV host

- Born: November 16, 1987 (age 38); Charleston, South Carolina, US
- Occupation: Chef
- Known for: Delicious Miss Brown
- Awards: Daytime Emmy Award for Outstanding Culinary Program; Daytime Emmy Award for Outstanding Lifestyle/Culinary Show Host

Kardea Brown (born November 16, 1987) is an American chef and caterer who is the host of the television show Delicious Miss Brown on the Food Network. In 2025, Brown received the Daytime Emmy Awards for Outstanding Culinary Instructional Series and Outstanding Culinary Host, she is the first African American woman to win a Daytime Emmy in both of those categories. Her television show has reached 3.5 million viewers since its 2019 premiere, averaging over 1 million viewers per episode, and its 10th season began in 2024. Brown has also released 2 cookbooks, open a restaurant in the Charleston Airport, and released her own frozen food line.

== Personal life ==
Brown was born in Charleston, South Carolina on November 16, 1987. She is of Gullah descent; her grandmother is from Wadmalaw Island. Raised by a single mother, she grew up in Charleston before moving to Atlanta. Her grandmother helped raise her alongside her big and tight knit family. She was raised as a Southern Baptist and attended church regularly with her mother and grandmother, from whom she learned her cooking skills. She is a contemporary Southern cook.

Brown graduated from Oglethorpe University in Atlanta, Georgia with a degree in Psychology, and attended St. Peters University in New Jersey for graduate school. She married her husband Bryon in Mexico, and lives with him in Charleston, South Carolina. Brown married Bryon Smith on March 8, 2025.

== Career ==
After graduating from college, Brown worked at a child placement agency before moving to Newark, New Jersey to work for Big Brothers Big Sisters. Her then boyfriend submitted an audition tape of Brown to Food Network. Food Network told Brown that they loved her personality, but that her cooking skills needed some work. Brown sold everything to move back to Charleston, and she started the New Gullah Supper Club in 2015, a pop-up traveling supper club featuring traditional Gullah dishes "with a contemporary twist" at events often featuring Gullah singers or storytellers. The New Gullah Supper Club traveled from state to state paying tribute to recipes passed down from Brown’s mother and grandmother.

In addition to the New Gullah Supper Club, Brown continued her TV career. Brown made her Food Network debut on BBQ Blitz in 2015. She was invited by Food Network to be on Beat Bobby Flay and to host Cupcake Championship before being offered her own show, Delicious Miss Brown. Brown signed an exclusive contract with Food Network in 2021, which included her being the host of The Great Soul Food Cook-Off. Brown has also appeared on Cooks vs Cons, Farmhouse Rules, Family Food Showdown, Spring Baking Championship, Kids Baking Championship Thanksgiving, Chopped Junior, and Kids BBQ Championship. In 2025, Brown joined Duff Goldman as a co-host on season 13 of Kids Baking Championship, and replaced the former co-host Valerie Bertinelli.

Delicious Miss Brown aims to bring people together through food and give people a better understanding of Gullah culture. The show is set at Brown's home on Edisto Island and focuses on "fresh, seasonal, and very seafood heavy" cooking. The show premiered on July 28, 2019. Each episode gets around 1 million viewers, whom Brown colloquially refers to as “cousins” on her show. Brown has featured many of her family members on the show, including her mother, grandmother, and brother. She hosted an episode with a fish-fry fundraiser to raise money for the restoration of Hutchinson House in 2021. Brown's great-great-great grandmother was the last person to own Hutchinson House, the oldest African American household on Edisto Island. During that show she discussed the history of slavery and the formerly enslaved people who built Hutchinson House, despite the network's past concerns about discussing similar topics on the network, according to food historian Dan Kohler.

Her first cookbook The Way Home: A Celebration of Sea Islands Food and Family was published in October 2022. Brown chose to name her cookbook The Way Home because she felt as though she found her way home after moving back to her hometown, Charleston, from New Jersey. The Way Home made it to number 6 on the New York Times Best Seller List.

Brown’s second cookbook, Make Do With What You Have, was published in November 2025. The cookbook features over 100 budget friendly recipes. The recipes are simple, inexpensive, use pantry staples, and are intended for large families. This cookbook draws on Brown’s experiences growing up in a single-parent household, and contains tips to save money while making delicious meals. In the cookbook, Brown shares stories about coupon hunting with her mother, getting by as a broke college student, and relying on her faith. As with her first cookbook, Brown uses this one to document her ancestry and celebrate Gullah culture and cuisine.

On April 21, 2025, Brown opened Kardea Brown’s Southern Kitchen in the Charleston Airport. This is Brown’s first restaurant, and it is inspired by flavors and recipes from Gullah cuisine.

In 2023, Brown launched her frozen food line called Delicious Eats. Dishes include chicken fettuccine alfredo, chicken pot pie, country kitchen fried chicken, and sausage and grits. All of the food is inspired by her passion for Gullah cuisine. The dishes are available at Walmarts around the United States.

== Awards ==
Brown won two Daytime Emmys in 2025, one for Outstanding Culinary Host, and one for Outstanding Instructional Culinary Series. Brown is the first African American woman to win a Daytime Emmy in both of those categories.
