= The Adventure Begins (disambiguation) =

The Adventure Begins can refer to:

== Film ==
- Thomas & Friends: The Adventure Begins, a 2015 animated film
- Buzz Lightyear of Star Command: The Adventure Begins, a 2000 animated film
- Geng: The Adventure Begins, a 2009 animated film
- Remo Williams: The Adventure Begins, a 1985 action-adventure film
- Ultraman: The Adventure Begins, a 1981 animated film

== Television ==
- "The Adventure Begins", Barefoot Contessa season 18, episode 1 (2013)
- "The Adventure Begins", Biker Mice from Mars (2006) episodes 1–2 (2006)
- "The Adventure Begins", Bruno the Kid episode 1 (1996)
- "The Adventure Begins", Dino-Riders episode 1 (1987)
- "The Adventure Begins!", Elsword: El Lady episode 1 (2016)
- "The Adventure Begins", Pac-Man and the Ghostly Adventures season 1, episodes 1–2 (2013)
- "The Adventure Begins", Street Fighter season 1, episode 1 (1995)

== Other ==
- Greyhawk: The Adventure Begins, a sourcebook for the Dungeons & Dragons role-playing game
