= Chefography =

American TV series

- Country of origin: United States

Production
- Running time: 60 minutes

Original release
- Network: Food Network
- Release: present

Chefography is a biographical television series of Food Network personalities. Chefography was created by Baron Corso de Palenzuela. While the name implies that the program features biographies of chefs, it in fact includes both chef and non-chef Food Network personalities.

The series airs on Food Network in the United States and Food Network Canada in Canada.

== Biographies broadcast ==
- Mario Batali
- Laura Calder
- Paula Deen
- Giada De Laurentiis
- Bobby Flay
- Tyler Florence
- Ina Garten
- Emeril Lagasse
- Nigella Lawson
- Alexandra Guarnaschelli
- Sandra Lee
- Rachael Ray

The following Chefographies premiered Monday, April, 7th through Thursday, April 10, 2008:

- Julia Child (April 7)
- Duff Goldman (April 10)
- Wolfgang Puck (April 8)
- Food Network (April 9)

The Following Chefographies premiered Saturday, August 15, 2009:

- The Neelys (Pat and Gina Neely)
- Guy Fieri

An episode about Robert Irvine was put into production but was pulled from the schedule before the completion of the episode due to controversy surrounding Irvine.
