= Giada at Home =

- Starring: Giada de Laurentiis
- Country of origin: United States
- No. of seasons: 6
- No. of episodes: 215

Production
- Running time: 30 minutes

Original release
- Network: Food Network
- Release: October 18, 2008 – June 7, 2015

Giada at Home is an American cooking show hosted by Giada De Laurentiis. It first aired on October 18, 2008 on the Food Network. Production ended in June 2015.

The show was nominated for two Daytime Emmys in 2009: for Outstanding Culinary Program and Outstanding Directing in a Lifestyle/Culinary Program, and won for the latter award.

The show was nominated for four Daytime Emmys in 2010 for; Outstanding Multi-Camera Editing, Outstanding Directing in a Lifestyle/Culinary Program, Outstanding Lifestyle/Culinary Host (Giada De Laurentiis) and Outstanding Culinary Program. It won in the categories of Outstanding Directing in a Lifestyle/Culinary Program (2nd year in a row) and Outstanding Culinary Program.

An episode on April 19, 2015 rated 641,000 U.S. viewers.

== Production ==
The show moves beyond the Italian cooking featured on Everyday Italian, and instead focuses on Giada cooking for friends and family, as well as party planning.
