= Giada De Laurentiis =

Italian-American chef and television personality

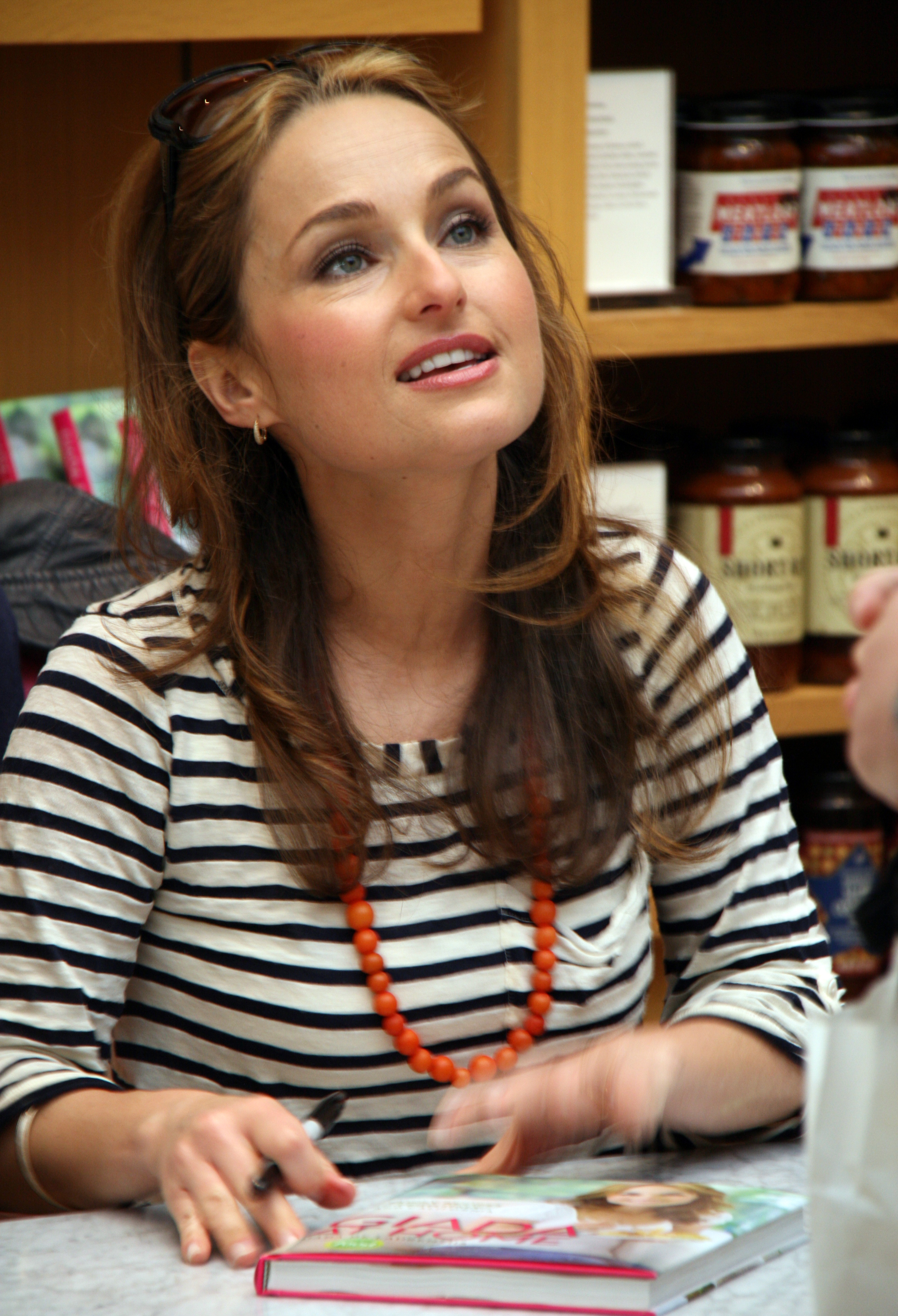
- De Laurentiis in 2010
- Born: Giada Pamela De Benedetti; August 22, 1970 (age 56); Rome, Italy
- Education: University of California, Los Angeles; Le Cordon Bleu
- Spouse: Todd Thompson (m. 2003; div. 2015)
- Partner: Shane Farley (2015–present)
- Children: 1
- Parents: Alex De Benedetti (father); Veronica De Laurentiis (mother)
- Relatives: Raffaella De Laurentiis (aunt); Federico De Laurentiis (uncle); Dino De Laurentiis (grandfather); Silvana Mangano (grandmother); Luigi De Laurentiis (granduncle); Aurelio De Laurentiis (first cousin once removed)
- Culinary career
- Cooking style: Italian
- Television shows
- Everyday Italian (2005–08); Giada's Weekend Getaways (2007–08); Giada in Paradise (2007–2013); Giada at Home (2008–2015); Giada in Italy (2015–present); Giada Entertains (2016–present); Giada's Holiday Handbook (2015–present); Giada on The Beach (2018–present); Winner Cake All (2019–present); Bobby and Giada in Italy (2021–present); Simply Giada (2022–present)
- Awards
- Daytime Emmy Award (2008); Gracie Award (2012)
- Website: Official website

Giada Pamela De Laurentiis (Note: English: /dʒiˈɑːdə diː ləˈrɛntɪs/ jee-AH-də dee lə-REN-tiss, Italian: [ˈdʒaːda paˈmɛːla de lauˈrɛnti.is].) (born Giada Pamela De Benedetti, August 22, 1970) is an Italian-American chef, entrepreneur, writer, and television personality. She was the host of Food Network's program called Giada at Home. She also appears regularly as a contributor and guest co-host on NBC's program titled Today. De Laurentiis is the founder of the catering business GDL Foods. She is a winner of the Daytime Emmy Award for Outstanding Lifestyle Host and the Gracie Award for Best Television Host. She was also recognized by the International Hospitality Institute as one of the Global 100 in Hospitality, a list featuring the 100 Most Powerful People in Global Hospitality.

== Early life ==
De Laurentiis was born on August 22, 1970, in Rome, Italy. The eldest child of actress Veronica De Laurentiis and her first husband, actor-producer Alex De Benedetti. She has two younger brothers and a younger sister. Alex De Benedetti was a close associate of Giada's maternal grandfather, film producer Dino De Laurentiis. As a child, Giada often found herself in the family's kitchen and spent a great deal of time at her grandfather's restaurant, DDL Foodshow. Her parents were married in February 1970 but were later divorced. After her parents' divorce, Giada and her siblings moved to Southern California, where they took their mother's surname. After graduating from Marymount High School in Los Angeles, De Laurentiis attended the University of California, Los Angeles, earning her bachelor's degree in social anthropology in 1996.

Her maternal great-grandmother was English and her grandmother was the Italian film star Silvana Mangano. Her paternal grandmother, Pamela De Benedetti (née Leslie-Jones; 1923–1998), was also English. Her siblings include sister Eloisa, a make-up artist, and brothers Igor and Dino Alexander II, a Hollywood film editor who died of melanoma in 2003. Her stepfather is producer Ivan Kavalsky.

== Career ==
De Laurentiis studied at Le Cordon Bleu in Paris, with aspirations of becoming a pastry chef. After returning to the United States, she became a professional chef working in several Los Angeles restaurants, notably the Wolfgang Puck-owned Spago. She later worked as a food stylist and was contacted by the Food Network after styling a piece in Food & Wine magazine in 2002.

Her daytime cooking show on the Food Network, Everyday Italian, premiered April 5, 2003. On Chefography, a Food Network biography program, she said she never wanted to be in her "family business" of show business, and that she felt uncomfortable in front of the camera when she first began hosting Everyday Italian. When the program first aired, the Food Network received mail accusing the network of hiring a model or actress pretending to cook instead of a real chef.

De Laurentiis began hosting Behind the Bash in October 2005. The program examines the catering process behind big event extravaganzas such as the Grammy Awards. In January 2007, a third De Laurentiis-hosted show, Giada's Weekend Getaways, debuted on Food Network. On this show, De Laurentiis travels to a featured locale (including Seattle, South Beach, San Francisco, Napa, and Jackson Hole, Wyoming) and visits her favorite local culinary destinations. On a November 2006 episode of Iron Chef America, De Laurentiis and Bobby Flay competed against, and were defeated by, Rachael Ray and Mario Batali.

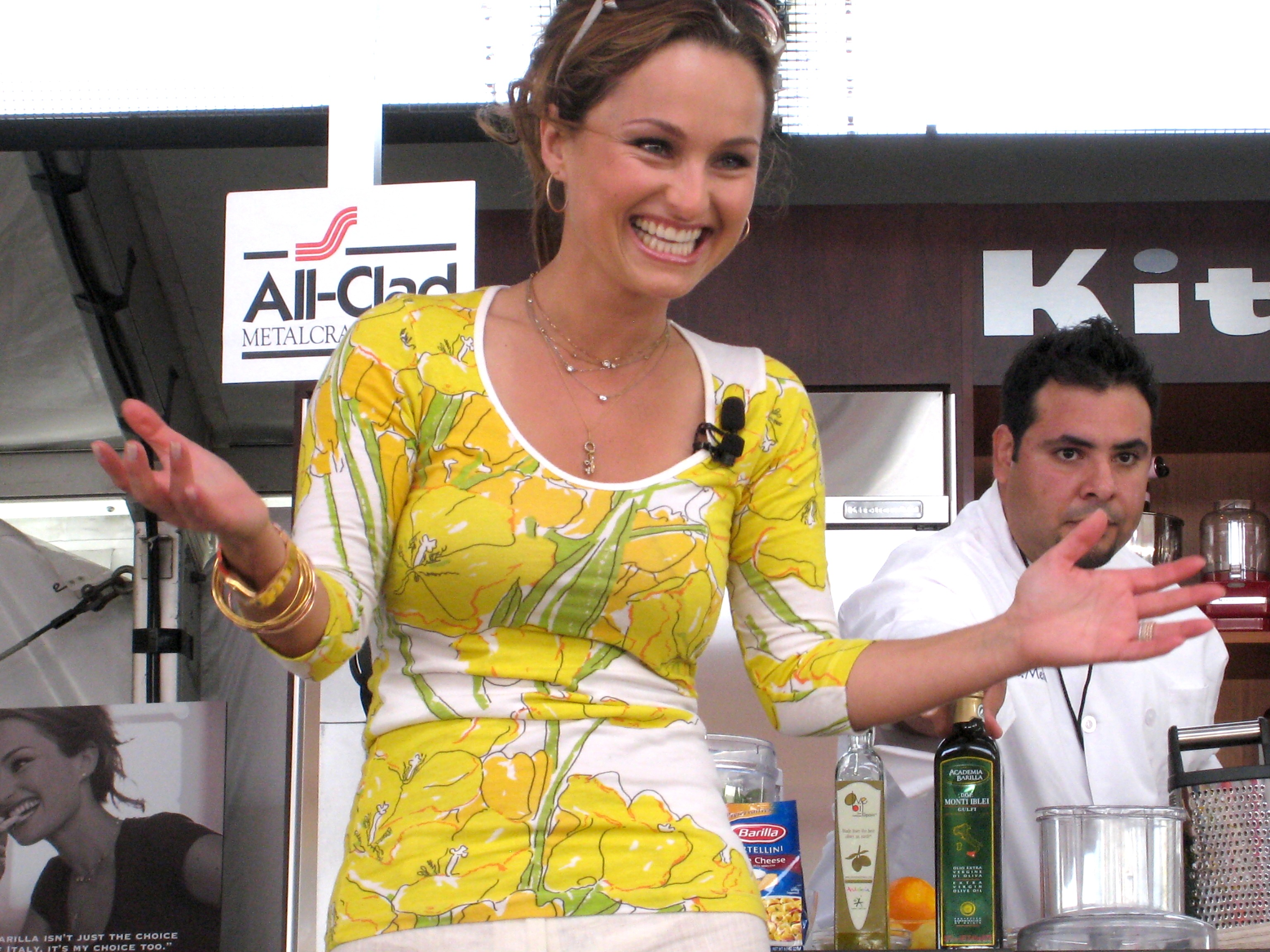
De Laurentiis at the South Beach Wine and Food Festival 2007

In 2007, De Laurentiis appeared as a presenter at the inaugural Food Network Awards. In June 2007, she hosted a two-part Food Network special titled Giada in Paradise, featuring the two locales of Santorini, Greece and Capri, Italy. De Laurentiis also made several appearances as a guest judge on the third season of The Next Food Network Star, which aired in 2007. That year she was dubbed a "petite powerhouse" by Town & Country magazine, standing "just under five-foot two". In 2008, she won a Daytime Emmy Award for Outstanding Lifestyle Host.

In 2008, De Laurentiis and the Barilla Group launched an Italian gourmet line under the Academia Barilla name—Barilla's first-ever gourmet celebrity product line. That same year, Giada at Home premiered, showing De Laurentiis in a kitchen preparing meals and parties for family and friends. The show is shot on a set that is very similar to her own home. She joined fellow chef Bobby Flay as a judge in season 7 of Food Network Star and took on a new role in season 8 as a team leader of five cooks competing against Bobby Flay's and Alton Brown's respective teams.

In 2009, De Laurentiis became the voice of "Paulette", a character on the animated children's show Handy Manny. In early 2010, De Laurentiis came out with a line of kitchen supplies, exclusively for Target. That same year, CafeMom ranked her as #6 on their yearly "Sexiest Moms Alive" list. In June 2010, De Laurentiis became a regularly appearing mentor to the finalists on the popular Food Network competition show The Next Food Network Star.

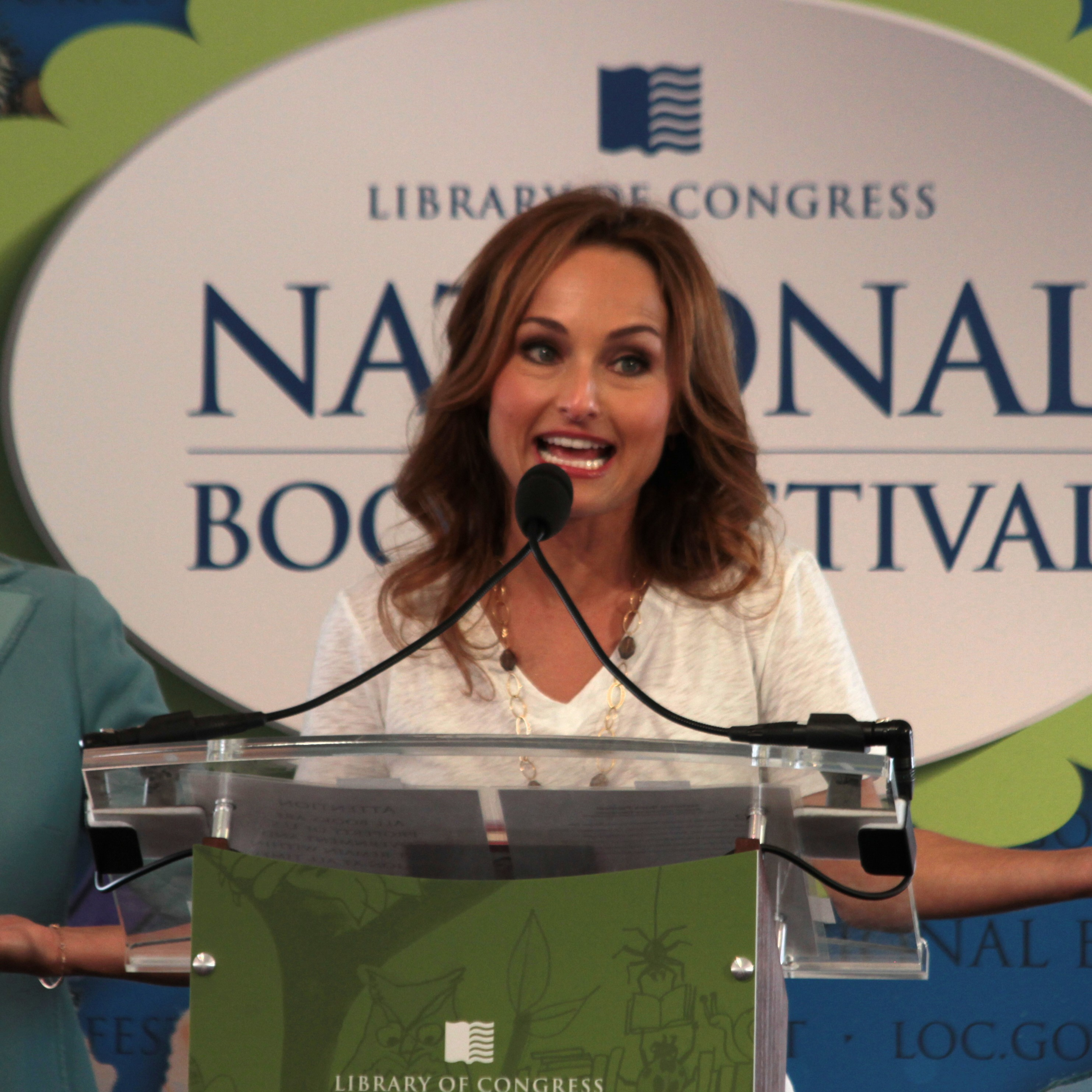
De Laurentiis at the National Book Festival 2013

In July 2014, De Laurentiis opened her first restaurant, called GIADA, inside The Cromwell in Las Vegas, Nevada. The restaurant offers seating in the dining room, lounge, or outdoor patio with views of the Bellagio fountains and Caesars Palace. The GIADA menu includes Italian cuisine with Californian influences, including "lemon spaghetti, chicken cacciatore, marsala herb chicken meatballs, rosemary focaccia and lemon flatbread and vegetable Bolognese rigatoni". Family-style, vegan, and gluten-free options are also available, as well as an antipasto station. Restaurant guests can watch chefs prepare food from the open kitchen.

In 2013, De Laurentiis voiced the character of Gelata in the U.S. version of the Tinker Bell special Pixie Hollow Bake Off.

In 2017, she launched a new product, an e-commerce platform called Giadzy.com, which aims to showcase new recipes, provide travel and cooking tips, as well as sell high-quality products (mainly related to Italian/Italian-American cuisine).

In 2018, De Laurentiis voiced herself in the movie Scooby-Doo! and the Gourmet Ghost.

On June 26, 2020, De Laurentiis' Food Network series Giada Entertains won a Daytime Emmy Award as Outstanding Culinary Series. On July 26, 2020, De Laurentiis won the Daytime Emmy for Outstanding Culinary Host.

On February 10, 2023, De Laurentiis signed a multi-year deal to create and produce unscripted programming with Amazon Studios. Later in February, De Laurentiis was named as the godmother for the Oceania Cruises' ship Vista, the first new ship from the cruise line in more than a decade.

=== Products ===
De Laurentiis had a range of products made exclusively for Target. In 2013, ceramic lasagna pans under the Giada De Laurentiis brand were recalled after they cracked and at least six people were injured.

In 2022, Target only seems to carry her books, including a Target edition of Eat Better, Feel Better.

=== Restaurants ===
De Laurentiis has two restaurants on the Las Vegas Strip. She opened her first restaurant in May 2014. The restaurant, simply called "Giada", is located in the Cromwell. She opened a second restaurant in early 2018. "Pronto by Giada", taking up residency in Caesars Palace, is a fast casual dining restaurant.

In July 2017, she announced she would also be opening a restaurant in the Horseshoe Casino in Baltimore, Maryland, just north of Washington, D.C. It is called GDL Italian by Giada, and opened in May 2018.

== Personal life ==
On May 25, 2003, De Laurentiis married Todd Thompson, a fashion designer. The couple's only child, a daughter, was born in 2008. While acknowledging how special the experience of having a child has been, she has stated that she does not plan to have more children. De Laurentiis remains focused on her career, saying, "I have so many babies: the show, Todd, and Jade". On December 29, 2014, De Laurentiis announced on her website that she and Todd had separated the previous July, and had decided to end their marriage. The divorce was finalized on September 3, 2015.

In November 2003, her brother passed away after being diagnosed with melanoma.

Since November 2015, she has been romantically involved with TV producer Shane Farley.

In 2023, she was one of the chefs who cooked for World Central Kitchen's Feeding Hope dinner in Los Angeles.

== Publications ==
- Everyday Italian: 125 Simple and Delicious Recipes. New York: Clarkson Potter. 2005. ISBN 978-1-4000-5258-5.
- Giada's Family Dinners. New York: Clarkson Potter. 2006. ISBN 978-0-307-23827-6.
- Everyday Pasta. New York: Clarkson Potter. 2007. ISBN 978-0-307-34658-2.
- Giada's Kitchen: New Italian Favorites. New York: Clarkson Potter. 2008. ISBN 978-0-307-34659-9.
- Giada at Home: Family Recipes from Italy and California. New York: Clarkson Potter. 2010. ISBN 978-0-307-45101-9.
- Weeknights with Giada: Quick and Simple Recipes to Revamp Dinner. New York: Clarkson Potter. 2012. ISBN 978-0-307-45102-6.
- Giada's Feel Good Food. New York: Clarkson Potter. 2013. ISBN 978-0-307-98720-4.
- Happy Cooking. New York: Pam Krauss Books. 2015. ISBN 978-0-8041-8792-3.
- Giada's Italy. New York: Clarkson Potter. 2018. ISBN 978-0-307-98722-8.
- Eat Better, Feel Better: My Recipes for Wellness and Healing, Inside and Out. Emmaus, Pa.: Rodale Books. 2021. ISBN 978-0-59313843-4.
- Eat Better, Feel Better - Target Exclusive Edition. Emmaus, Pa.: Rodale Books. 2021. ISBN 978-0-59323420-4.

Both Giada at Home and Weeknights with Giada landed in the number one position on The New York Times Best Seller list.

== Filmography ==
Year	Title	Role	Notes
2003-2011	Everyday Italian	Herself	Television debut; 164 episodes
2004	An Italian Christmas with Mario and Giada	Herself	
2005	Giada's Italian Holiday	Herself	
2005	Behind the Bash	Herself	
2006	Iron Chef America: The Series	Herself	TV episode: "Flay/DeLaurentiis vs. Batali/Ray: Cranberries"
2006	Chefography	Herself	TV episode:"Giada De Laurentiis"
2007	All Star Grill-Fest: South Beach	Herself	TV special
2007	Food Network Holidays	Herself	
2007-2008	Giada's Weekend Getaways	Herself	
2007-2013	Giada in Paradise	Herself	5 episodes
2008	Dear Food Network	Herself	Thanksgiving special
2008-2020	Giada at Home	Herself	246 episodes; executive producer
2009	Handy Manny	Paulette (voice)	"Flicker Joins the Band/Paulette's Pizza Palace"
2009-2018	The Next Food Network Star	Herself	98 episodes
2011-2012	The Perfect 3	Herself	11 episodes
2012	The 37th Annual Gracie Awards	Herself	
2012	The 39th Annual Daytime Emmy Awards	Herself	
2012	Chopped	Herself	
2012	Food Network Thanksgiving Live	Herself	
2012	The 86th Macy's Thanksgiving Day Parade	Herself	
2012	Holiday Kitchen Takeover	Herself	
2013	Barefoot Contessa & Back to Basics	Herself	
2013	The 40th Annual Daytime Emmy Awards	Herself	
2013	Food Network's 20th Birthday Party	Herself	TV special
2013	Tripping Out with Alie and Georgia	Waitress	
2013	Pixie Hollow Bake Off	Gelata	Voice role
2014	Cutthroat Kitchen	Herself	
2015-2017	Giada's Holiday Handbook	Herself	24 episodes; executive producer
2015-2017	Giada in Italy	Herself	27 episodes; executive producer
2016	Young & Hungry	Herself	"Young and Fried"
2016-2021	Giada Entertains	Herself	51 episodes; executive producer
2018	Giada on the Beach	Herself	Executive producer
2018	Scooby-Doo! and the Gourmet Ghost	Herself	Voice role
2018	Butterbean's Café	Sugar Plum Fairy	Voice role
2018-2019	Winner Cake All	Judge	13 episodes
2022	Always Amore		Executive producer
2026	Dancing with the Stars	Herself	Contestant (season 35)

=== Guest show appearances ===
Year	Title	Notes
2005	The Tony Danza Show	2 episodes
2006-2026	Today	101 episodes
2007	The Oprah Winfrey Show	1 episode
2007	Weekend Today	1 episode
2007; 2015	Jimmy Kimmel Live!	2 episodes
2011; 2012; 2013	Late Night with Jimmy Fallon	3 episodes
2011-2019	Rachael Ray	8 episodes
2012	Chelsea Lately	1 episode
2013	Big Morning Buzz Live	2 episodes
2013	Conan	1 episode
2015	Watch What Happens Live with Andy Cohen	1 episode
2015	Hollywood Game Night	1 episode
2015	The Wendy Williams Show	1 episode
2015	The Meredith Vieira Show	2 episodes
2015	Access Hollywood Live	2 episodes
2016	Late Night with Seth Meyers	1 episode
2016	Steve Harvey	1 episode
2018	The Late Show with Stephen Colbert	1 episode

== Awards and nominations ==
Year	Association	Category	Work	Result
2008	Daytime Emmy Awards	Outstanding Lifestyle Host	Everyday Italian	Won
2010	Daytime Emmy Awards	Outstanding Lifestyle Host	Giada at Home	Nominated
2012	Daytime Emmy Awards	Outstanding Lifestyle Host	Giada at Home	Nominated
2012	Gracie Awards	Outstanding Host	Giada at Home	Won
2020	Daytime Emmy Awards	Outstanding Culinary Host	Giada Entertains	Won
