= Scooby-Doo! and the Gourmet Ghost =

- DVD cover
- Directed by: Doug Murphy
- Written by: Tim Sheridan
- Based on: Characters by Hanna-Barbera Productions
- Produced by: Curt Geda; Sam Register (executive producer)
- Starring: Frank Welker; Grey DeLisle; Matthew Lillard; Kate Micucci; Bobby Flay; Giada De Laurentiis
- Edited by: Scott Fuselier
- Music by: Jake Monaco; Matthew Janszen
- Production company: Warner Bros. Animation
- Distributed by: Warner Bros. Home Entertainment
- Release dates: July 22, 2018 (San Diego Comic-Con); August 28, 2018 (Digital)
- Running time: 77 minutes
- Country: United States
- Language: English

Scooby-Doo! and the Gourmet Ghost is a 2018 American animated comedy mystery film produced by Warner Bros. Animation and distributed by Warner Bros. Home Entertainment, and the thirty-first entry in the direct-to-video series of Scooby-Doo films. It premiered at San Diego Comic-Con on July 22, 2018. The film was released digitally on August 28, 2018, and was released on DVD on September 11, 2018.

== Plot ==
The gang are en route to the Rocky Harbor Inn, where Fred's uncle Bobby Flay invited them to visit and stay. They arrive, and Fred is surprised to learn that his uncle is a world-famous chef. Bobby shows them the lobby, where they see a portrait of Fred's ancestor Edward Flay. The gang also meets Bobby's cat, Nacho, who graciously helps Scooby out of a bind. The townspeople have yet to find any clues about his disappearance. Bobby and the gang proceed to the best part of the inn, a very high-tech cooking arena. They meet Giada De Laurentiis and her cat Bella, and Marcus Samuelsson and his wife Maya Haile.

The inn's groundskeeper Jeremiah Noseworthy shows up, and quickly leaves mentioning a red ghost. Bobby elaborates that when Edward disappeared back in 1780, he was alone in the inn and people heard him cry out Red Ghost before he disappeared. The inn has been vacant because of the ghost, but since they reopened it, people claimed to have seen it. The next day on television, Gail announces the big show at the inn and has an interview with Jeremiah, who blurts out that Edward was a traitor. Nacho sees Skip Taylor telling him that he is leaving out of stress about the Red Ghost, but he changes his mind and goes back to lie down. A businessman named Bradley Bass comes in and tells Bobby that he is sitting on a gold mine, but Bobby refuses to sell. Daphne runs up to Bobby telling him something is happening in the arena.

Henry Metcalf, who wrote a famous book on the inn, shows up. He gives Bobby a folder of papers and continues by saying during the Revolutionary War, Edward welcomed soldiers to his inn and wrapped the dishes up in these papers for take-out. That night at the show, suddenly the animatronics begin to go haywire. It is soon discovered that this was caused by the Red Ghost, which drives the spectators away. The ghost tries to chase the gang, but Velma uses a fire extinguisher and the ghost disappears.

Later that evening, the gang notices that the parchment has words on it written in invisible ink, concluding that the personal papers were the parchments the whole time. One of them contains detailed information about troop movements, and the gang starts to think that Jeremiah was right about Edward being a spy. Scooby spots the Red Ghost stealing the rest of the papers, but is too scared to warn everyone else. While running through the lobby, the ghost trips on a carpet dropping all the papers and starts picking them up. The gang begins to follow the ghost's footprints once Scooby regains his bravery and alerts them as to what happened. The ghost tries to escape upstairs, but drops the parchment on the stairs and upon being spotted was forced to flee without them.

A package arrives at the inn, which is a court order mandating the immediate closure of the inn because it is a historic landmark. Suddenly, the ghost flies past them and the gang starts to follow it. To trap the ghost, the gang recreates the previous show. The Red Ghost shows up and tries to escape with the parchment, but the gang is ready for him and has one of the devices beat up the ghost until he collapses. The ghost is revealed to be Bradley Bass, who was using his smartphone to control the drone. He wanted to buy the inn cheap without damaging the reputation of Edward. Bradley, however, is revealed by Nacho to be Henry Metcalf in disguise. He spent his entire career around the story of Edward as a hero, but he stumbled upon the truth and did not want it to get out. He believed that the legend that was hidden in the inn was a set of personal papers written by Edward that would incriminate him. However, what Metcalf did not know was that the personal papers were in fact the parchment sheets he gave to Bobby until he overheard them in the kitchen. Velma then reveals that Edward wasn't working for the British, but was revealed to be working for George Washington as a spy for the Continental Army.

In the end of the film, Jeremiah is still moving and Velma wonders why. Fred explains that he and the gang had talked him into staying, but, since there was an exhibit in the museum, he decided to give it a try and he then moves away. The gang then says goodbye to Bobby and leave. As they leave, Velma reveals that Edward wasn't saying "Red Ghost", he was saying "redcoats" and when the British realised he was giving them false information, they decided to take him away. A shrill voice is heard and the gang stops, revealing it to be Skip Taylor, who was trying to sleep.

== Voice cast ==
- Frank Welker as Scooby-Doo and Fred Jones
- Matthew Lillard as Shaggy Rogers
- Grey DeLisle as Daphne Blake, Rocky
- Kate Micucci as Velma Dinkley
- Bobby Flay as himself
- Giada De Laurentiis as herself
- Marcus Samuelsson as himself
- Jim Cummings as Jeremiah Noseworthy, the Red Ghost
- Maya Haile as herself
- David Kaye as Henry Metcalf, Chef Edward DuFlay
- Salli Saffioti as Reporter and Nancy Metcalf
- Dana Snyder as Skip Taylor
- Jason Spisak as Bradley Bass
- Audrey Wasilewski as Chef Sue and Librarian
