= Ina Garten =

American television cook (born 1948)

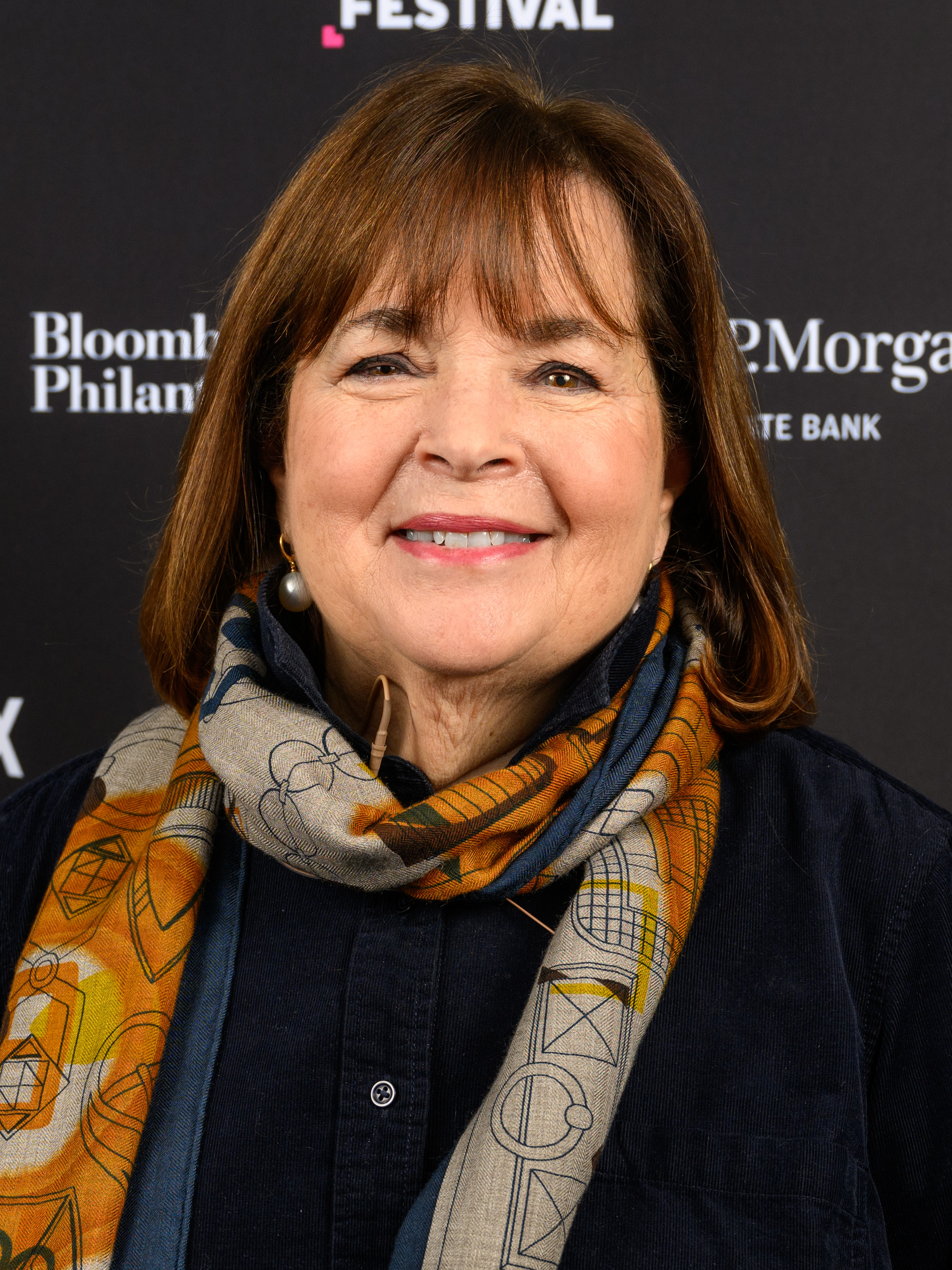
- Garten in 2024
- Born: Ina Rosenberg; February 2, 1948 (age 78); New York City, U.S.
- Education: Syracuse University; George Washington University School of Business
- Years active: 1978–present
- Spouse: Jeffrey Garten (m. 1968)
- Culinary career
- Television shows
- Barefoot Contessa; Be My Guest

Ina Rosenberg Garten (/ˈaɪnə/ EYE-nə; born February 2, 1948) is an American television cook and author. She is host of the Food Network program Barefoot Contessa and was formerly a staff member of the Office of Management and Budget. Among her dishes are Perfect Roast Chicken, Weeknight Bolognese, French Apple Tart, and a simplified version of beef bourguignon. Her culinary career began with her gourmet food store, Barefoot Contessa; Garten then expanded her activities to many best-selling cookbooks, magazine columns, and a popular Food Network television show.

== Early life ==
Ina Rosenberg was born to a Jewish family in Brooklyn, New York City. Her grandparents immigrated to the United States from Russia. She grew up in Stamford, Connecticut, the younger of two children born to Charles H. Rosenberg, a surgeon specializing in otolaryngology, and his wife, Florence (née Rich), a dietitian. Her home life was difficult, with her father prone to violent outbursts towards his children; she later reflected, "I think he loved me, but he wanted me to be who he wanted me to be, without any consciousness of who I am." With determination to excel in school, she showed an aptitude for science and has said she uses her scientific mindset while experimenting with recipes. Garten's mother, an intellectual with an interest in opera, discouraged Ina from helping in the kitchen, instead directing her towards schoolwork. Garten described her father as a socializer and admits she shares more characteristics with him than her mother. Both of her parents were critical at first of her decision to embark on a career in food but later became more supportive.

At 15, she met her future husband Jeffrey Garten on a trip to visit her brother at Dartmouth College. After high school, she attended Syracuse University majoring in economics, transferred to North Carolina State University, and later received her MBA from George Washington University School of Business.

== Career ==
On December 22, 1968, Jeffrey and Ina were married in Stamford and soon relocated to Fort Bragg, North Carolina. She began to dabble in cooking and entertaining in an effort to occupy her time; Jeffrey served a four-year military tour during the Vietnam War. She also acquired her pilot's certificate. After her husband had completed his military service, the couple went on a four-month camping vacation in Europe including time in France, which sparked her love for French cuisine. During this trip, she was introduced to open-air markets, produce stands, and fresh cooking ingredients. Upon returning to the U.S., she began to cultivate her culinary abilities by studying the volumes of Simone Beck, Louisette Bertholle and Julia Child's influential cookbook, Mastering the Art of French Cooking. During this time, weekly dinner parties turned to tradition, and she refined her home entertaining skills when she and her husband moved to Washington, D.C., in 1972.

In Washington, Garten worked in the White House; Jeffrey worked in the State Department earning his Ph.D. at Johns Hopkins School for Advanced International Studies. Garten was originally employed by the Federal Power Commission and later at the White House Office of Management and Budget. Eventually she was assigned the position of budget analyst, which entailed writing the nuclear energy budget and policy papers on nuclear centrifuge plants for presidents Gerald Ford and Jimmy Carter.

While she worked at OMB, Garten also taught herself to cook and entertain while buying and renovating old houses in the Dupont Circle and Kalorama neighborhoods. She used the profits from these sales to make her next purchase, the Barefoot Contessa specialty food store.

=== Barefoot Contessa store ===
Garten left her government job in 1978 after spotting an ad for a 400-square-foot (37 m^{2}) specialty food store called the Barefoot Contessa in Westhampton Beach, New York. "My job in Washington was intellectually exciting and stimulating but it wasn't me at all," she explained four years later. She also found it better for her marriage that she and her husband lead more independent lives, as a more conventional configuration earlier on, in which Jeffrey was the head of household, had become stifling and led to a brief separation.

After a trip to visit the store, she bought it and moved to New York. She often worked 12-hour days at the business. The store had been named by its original owner in tribute to the 1954 film, which starred Ava Gardner. Garten kept the name; it meshed well with her idea of an "elegant but earthy" lifestyle. Incidentally, as of 2006 she had not seen the film.

Three years later, Garten had moved the Barefoot Contessa across Main Street to a larger property, and, in 1985, she opened a second location at the newly vacated premises of gourmet shop Dean & DeLuca in the Long Island village of East Hampton. In contrast to Westhampton's seasonal beach atmosphere, East Hampton houses a year-round community, providing a larger customer base. In East Hampton, Garten expanded the store to more than seven times its original size, from 400 square feet (37 m^{2}) to more than 3,000 square feet (280 m^{2}). In this new, larger space, the store specialized in delicacies such as lobster Cobb salad, caviar, imported cheeses, and locally grown produce.

As the business grew, Garten employed local chefs and bakers including Anna Pump (who later bought the Loaves & Fishes specialty food store and the Bridgehampton Inn). Celebrity clientele such as Steven Spielberg praised the shop in the press.

In 1996, after two decades of operating Barefoot Contessa, Garten again found herself seeking a change; she sold the store to two employees, Amy Forst and Parker Hodges. She retained ownership of the building itself. Unsure of what career step to take after selling the store, she took a one year sabbatical from the culinary scene and built an office for herself above the store. There, she studied the stock market and attempted to sketch out plans for potential business ventures. At the time, her website, Barefoot Contessa, became a high-profile business as she began offering her coffees and a few other items for purchase online.

By 2003, Barefoot Contessa had become a landmark gathering place for East Hampton; director Nancy Meyers chose the store as one of the sets for the Jack Nicholson-Diane Keaton film Something's Gotta Give. The store was permanently closed in 2003 when the property lease expired and negotiations failed between Garten (still the owner of the building) and the new owners. Garten did not reopen the shop but kept the property for potential new tenants. As of 2024, it houses a Rag & Bone location.

=== Barefoot Contessa cookbooks ===
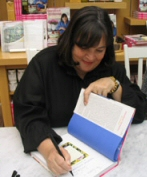
Garten at a book signing

In 1999, Garten reemerged with her attention turned to publishing. She carried on the Barefoot Contessa name in her 1999 sleeper bestseller, The Barefoot Contessa Cookbook. The book, containing the recipes that made her store successful, far exceeded both Garten's and publisher Clarkson Potter's expectations. Garten sold over 100,000 copies in the first year, immediately requiring second and third print runs after the initial printing of 25,000 cookbooks were sold. In 2001, she published Barefoot Contessa Parties!, which also garnered praise and generated high sales; Barefoot Contessa Family Style followed in 2002. The Barefoot Contessa Cookbook and Parties! were nominated for 2000 and 2002 James Beard Awards in the Entertaining & Special Occasion Cookbooks category. Parties! was a surprise entry—Garten was perceived as too inexperienced to compete with nominees such as French chef Jacques Pépin and international wine expert Brian St. Pierre.

Her cookbooks have many color photographs, including a full-page picture facing each recipe. In her memoir, Be Ready When The Luck Happens, Garten wrote that one of her publishers didn't think this style of cookbook would sell, as cookbook "bibles" were popular at the time. Regardless, her cookbooks have received positive reviews; in 2005, fellow chef Giada De Laurentiis named Garten as one of her favorite authors. As of 2023, Garten has published thirteen cookbooks with more than 14 million copies in print.

The richness of Garten's recipes has long been noted, with The New Yorker calling her "America's reigning queen of tastefully-deployed butterfat". In 2010, the Physicians Committee for Responsible Medicine criticized her cookbook Barefoot Contessa: How Easy Is That? for its use of high-fat, high-calorie, and high-cholesterol meat and dairy ingredients, naming it one of "The Five Worst Cookbooks" of the year from a nutritional standpoint. In response, Eric Felten of The Wall Street Journal called the report "an assault on cookbooks that dare to venture beyond lentils."

=== Barefoot Contessa on Food Network ===
Garten established herself with her cookbooks and appearances on Martha Stewart's show, and then moved into the forefront in 2002 with the debut of her Food Network program. After the success of The Barefoot Contessa Cookbook and Barefoot Contessa Parties!, Garten was approached by Food Network with an offer to host her own television cooking show. An early effort with Stewart's production company in 2000 proved unsuccessful, as Garten struggled to adjust to the large television crew and highly structured environment. However, when Pacific, the London-based production company responsible for Nigella Bites, proposed a show with a smaller crew and a more casual setup, she agreed to film a 13-episode season, and Barefoot Contessa premiered in 2002 to a positive reception.

Her show features her husband and their friends and generally only hosts celebrities who are her friends. Barefoot Contessa had approximately one million viewers tuned in per episode and has posted some of Food Network's highest ratings.

In 2005, the show was nominated for a Daytime Emmy Award in the category of Best Service Show. In 2009, the show and Garten were once again nominated for Daytime Emmy Awards in the categories of Best Culinary Program and Best Culinary Host, and Garten won her first Emmy in the latter category.

In the same year, Garten announced that she had signed a three-year contract with Food Network to continue her cooking show, and will release two more cookbooks following Barefoot Contessa at Home. Garten was reportedly awarded the most lucrative contract for a culinary author to date, signing a multimillion-dollar deal for multiple books. She has also been approached several times to develop her own magazine, line of furniture, set of cookware, and chain of boutiques (reminiscent of Stewart's Omnimedia), but has declined these offers saying she has no interest in further complicating her life. In 2023, Barefoot Contessa, Go-To Dinners sold more than 800,000 copies and rose to number one on the New York Times bestseller list.

In 2022, Garten launched Be My Guest on Discovery+ and the Food Network. In this show, she hosts celebrities for visits.

=== Barefoot Contessa Pantry ===
In 2006, Garten with her business partner Frank Newbold, launched her own line of packaged cake mixes, marinades, sauces, and preserves branded as Barefoot Contessa Pantry. This was done in conjunction with Stonewall Kitchen. The convenience foods were based on her most popular from-scratch recipes including coconut cupcakes, maple oatmeal scones, mango chutney, and lemon curd. The pricing for the items was comparatively expensive (for example the suggested retail price for a single box of brownie mix is ten dollars). They were only sold through upscale cookware and gourmet shops such as Crate & Barrel, Sur La Table, and Chicago's Fox & Obel Market Cafe.

=== Other Barefoot Contessa publications ===
After critical acclaim and high sales of her first three cookbooks, she went on to write Barefoot in Paris and several columns for O, The Oprah Magazine. She also serves as the entertaining, cooking, and party planning consultant for the magazine. House Beautiful, a shelter magazine, featured a monthly Garten column entitled "Ask the Barefoot Contessa" until 2011. In this column, she gave cooking, entertaining, and lifestyle tips in response to letters from her readers. She launched a small line of note cards and journals to complement her books, and wrote the forewords for Kathleen King's Tate's Bake Shop Cookbook and Rori Trovato's Dishing With Style. One of her recipes, 'lemon roast chicken with croutons', was featured in The Best American Recipes 2005–2006. Another of Garten's dishes was selected for Today's Kitchen Cookbook, a compilation of the most popular recipes featured on the daily news program The Today Show. For Thanksgiving 2010, her recipes were featured by Google on their homepage. In June 2012, she started a Facebook blog and three weeks later had over 100,000 followers. In 2019, she lent friend and author Sheryl Haft her recipe for potato latkes for the children's book, Goodnight Bubbala.

On September 16, 2026, Garten premiered her new show, Happy Hour with Ina Garten, on YouTube, featuring guests in her New York City apartment.

== Awards and honors ==
Garten was selected for the inaugural 2021 Forbes "50 Over 50" list of entrepreneurs, leaders, scientists and creators who are over the age of 50.

== Personal life ==
Her husband Jeffrey Garten was Undersecretary of Commerce for International Trade in the Bill Clinton administration from 1993 to 1995. He was the dean of the Yale School of Management from 1995 to 2005. He can frequently be seen on her cooking show, assisting his wife with simple tasks or sampling the dishes she has created. They divide their time living in Manhattan, East Hampton, and Paris.

Registered in New York as a Democrat, Garten has contributed to the presidential campaign funds of George H. W. Bush, Bill Clinton, John Kerry, and Barack Obama. In 2004, she hosted a benefit for Planned Parenthood. However, she has generally avoided speaking publicly about politics, telling The New Yorker in 2024, "I don't think I would change people's minds".

Garten also sat on the Design Review Board for East Hampton, a panel that grants building permissions and approves architectural and design elements of the village. The board seeks to protect the historical district and further the overall aesthetics of the area.

Garten has written a memoir with Deborah Davis, titled Be Ready When the Luck Happens, published in October 2024.

== Works ==
=== Books ===
- The Barefoot Contessa Cookbook. Clarkson Potter. 1999. ISBN 978-0-609-60219-5.
- Barefoot Contessa Parties! Ideas and Recipes For Easy Parties That Are Really Fun. Clarkson Potter. 2001. ISBN 978-0-609-60644-5.
- Barefoot Contessa Family Style: Easy Ideas and Recipes That Make Everyone Feel Like Family. Clarkson Potter. 2002. ISBN 978-0-609-61066-4.
- Barefoot in Paris: Easy French Food You Can Make at Home. Clarkson Potter. 2004. ISBN 978-1-4000-4935-6.
- Barefoot Contessa at Home: Everyday Recipes You'll Make Over and Over Again. Clarkson Potter. 2006. ISBN 978-1-4000-5434-3.
- Barefoot Contessa Back to Basics: Fabulous Flavor from Simple Ingredients. Clarkson Potter. 2008. ISBN 978-1400054350.
- Barefoot Contessa: How Easy Is That? Clarkson Potter. 2010. ISBN 978-0307238764.
- Barefoot Contessa: Foolproof: Recipes You Can Trust. Clarkson Potter. 2012. ISBN 978-0307464873.
- Make It Ahead: A Barefoot Contessa Cookbook. Clarkson Potter. 2014. ISBN 978-0-307464880.
- Cooking for Jeffrey: A Barefoot Contessa Cookbook. Clarkson Potter. 2016. ISBN 978-0307464897.
- Cook Like a Pro: Recipes and Tips for Home Cooks. Clarkson Potter. 2018. ISBN 978-0804187046.
- Modern Comfort Food: A Barefoot Contessa Cookbook. Clarkson Potter. 2020. ISBN 978-0804187060.
- Go-To Dinners: A Barefoot Contessa Cookbook. Clarkson Potter. 2022. ISBN 978-1984822789.
- Be Ready When the Luck Happens. Random House. 2024. ISBN 978-0-593-79989-5.
- Simply Ina: a Barefoot Contessa Cookbook: Barely Cooking, Shortcut, Make Ahead, Really Fast. Clarkson Potter. 2026. ISBN 9780593234174.

=== Magazine columns ===
- "Entertaining is Fun!" (Martha Stewart Living 1999–present)
- "Entertaining." (O, The Oprah Magazine 2003–present)
- "Ask the Barefoot Contessa." (House Beautiful 2006–present)

=== Television ===
- From Martha's Kitchen: Ina Garten's Kitchen Clambake (2000)
- Barefoot Contessa (2002–2021)
- Chefography (2006-2010)
- 30 Rock (2010-2011)
- Be My Guest (2022–present)
