= Delicious Miss Brown =

American cooking show

- Genre: Cooking show; Food reality television
- Based on: Delicious Miss Brown by Kardea Brown
- Developed by: Jonathan Bennett
- Presented by: Kardea Brown
- Country of origin: United States
- Original language: English
- No. of seasons: 10
- No. of episodes: 115

Production
- Executive producer: Kardea Brown
- Producer: Jonathan Bennett
- Production location: Edisto Island
- Running time: 21:00
- Production company: Frank

Original release
- Network: Food Network
- Release: July 28, 2019 – June 30, 2024

Delicious Miss Brown is an American cooking show that premiered on Food Network on July 28, 2019. The series is presented by chef Kardea Brown. It features Brown showcasing how to cook her Southern-inspired recipes from her home in Charleston, South Carolina.

== Episodes ==
=== Series overview ===
Season	Episodes	Originally released	
Season	Episodes	First released	Last released
1	6	July 28, 2019	September 1, 2019
2	13	January 5, 2020	March 29, 2020
Specials	4	June 28, 2020	July 19, 2020
3	13	September 5, 2020	December 5, 2020

=== Season 1 (2019) ===
No. overall	No. in season	Title	Original release date
1	1	"Sunday Supper"	July 28, 2019
2	2	"Beach Blanket Country Boil"	August 4, 2019
3	3	"Backyard Grill"	August 11, 2019
4	4	"Shrimp Fest"	August 18, 2019
5	5	"Picnic in the Park"	August 25, 2019
6	6	"Family Reunion"	September 1, 2019

=== Season 2 (2020) ===
No. overall	No. in season	Title	Original release date
7	1	"Light Low Country"	January 5, 2020
8	2	"Fishing and Dishing"	January 12, 2020
9	3	"Big Game Bites"	February 2, 2020
10	4	"For the Love of Chocolate..."	February 9, 2020
11	5	"Carolina Comfort"	February 23, 2020
12	6	"Miss Brown's Little Helpers"	January 26, 2020
13	7	""Too Cute" Brunch"	February 16, 2020
14	8	"Traveling Supper Club"	February 22, 2020
15	9	"Fancy for Less"	January 19, 2020
16	10	"Birthday Dinner"	March 1, 2020
17	11	"BFF Reunion"	March 8, 2020
18	12	"Sibling Supper"	March 15, 2020
19	13	"Wadmalaw Days"	March 29, 2020

=== Specials (2020) ===
Title	Original release date
"Cooking with Ma!"	June 28, 2020
"Family Favs"	July 5, 2020
"Lowcountry Classics"	July 12, 2020
"Outdoor Dishes"	July 19, 2020

=== Season 3 (2020) ===
No. overall	No. in season	Title	Original release date
20	1	"Grilling Out with the Girls"	September 5, 2020
21	2	"Lowcountry Lunch"	September 12, 2020
22	3	"Berry Delicious Brunch"	September 19, 2020
23	4	"Grillin' and Chillin'"	September 26, 2020
24	5	"Southern Table"	October 3, 2020
25	6	"Big Apple Down South"	October 10, 2020
26	7	"My Sweets!"	October 17, 2020
27	8	"Insta-licious"	October 24, 2020
28	9	"Comfort Cooking with Ma"	November 7, 2020
29	10	"All About the Sides"	November 14, 2020
30	11	"Dishes That Keep Giving"	November 21, 2020
31	12	"Miss Brown's Birthday!"	November 28, 2020
32	13	"A Sea Island Christmas"	December 5, 2020
