= List of Barefoot Contessa episodes =

This is a partial list of all Barefoot Contessa episodes.

== Season Overview ==
Season	Episodes	Originally released	
Season	Episodes	First released	Last released
1	13	November 30, 2002	March 1, 2003
2	18	June 14, 2003	February 14, 2004
3	10	June 5, 2004	October 16, 2004
4	10	November 13, 2004	June 11, 2005
5	11	June 18, 2005	October 29, 2005
6	11	November 12, 2005	June 17, 2006
7	9	June 26, 2006	November 25, 2006
8	11	November 26, 2006	June 2, 2007
9	10	June 23, 2007	October 20, 2007
10	10	December 1, 2007	March 1, 2008
11	18	October 18, 2008	March 14, 2009
12	20	July 18, 2009	November 20, 2010
13	10	May 29, 2010	November 27, 2011
14	10	January 8, 2011	May 21, 2011
15	10	July 2, 2011	December 3, 2011
16	10	January 1, 2012	May 22, 2012
17	8	June 16, 2012	December 1, 2012
18	10	January 12, 2013	April 6, 2013
19	10	June 29, 2013	October 26, 2013
20	5	January 26, 2014	March 2, 2014
21	7	July 20, 2014	October 26, 2014
22	9	October 16, 2016	December 11, 2016
23	8	May 28, 2017	July 16, 2017
24	8	March 11, 2018	April 29, 2018
25	9	October 21, 2018	December 9, 2018
Specials	3	March 8, 2003	December 3, 2013

== Episodes ==
=== Season 1 ===
No.	Title	Original release date	Prod. code
1–01	"The Mediterranean Feast"	November 30, 2002	IG1A01
1–02	"Holiday Meal"	December 7, 2002	IG1A02
1–03	"Elegant and Easy"	December 14, 2002	IG1A03
1–04	"Big Breakfast"	December 28, 2002	IG1A04
1–05	"Feel Good Food"	January 4, 2003	IG1A05
1–06	"Guests To Stay"	January 11, 2003	IG1A06
1–07	"The Homecoming"	January 18, 2003	IG1A07
1–08	"Portable Picnic"	January 25, 2003	IG1A08
1–09	"Stephen's Birthday"	February 1, 2003	IG1A09
1–10	"Romantic Breakfast"	February 8, 2003	IG1A10
1–11	"Scary Dinner"	February 15, 2003	IG1A11
1–12	"Kitchen Clambake"	February 22, 2003	IG1A12
1–13	"Soup Lunch"	March 1, 2003	IG1A13

=== Season 2 ===
No.	Title	Original release date	Prod. code
2–01	"All American"	June 14, 2003	IG1B01
2–02	"Tex Mex"	June 28, 2003	IG1B03
2–03	"Card Sharks"	July 4, 2003	IG1B02
2–04	"Dinners in the Fridge"	July 12, 2003	IG1B04
2–05	"Stress-Free Dinner Party"	July 19, 2003	IG1B05
2–06	"I Scream for Ice Cream"	July 26, 2003	IG1B06
2–07	"Kids in the Candy Store"	August 2, 2003	IG1B07
2–08	"Anniversary Dinner"	August 9, 2003	IG1B08
2–09	"Surprise Beach Party"	August 16, 2003	IG1B09
2–10	"Picnic at the Pond"	August 23, 2003	IG1B10
2–11	"Bon Voyage"	October 25, 2003	IG1B11
2–12	"Thanksgiving"	November 8, 2003	IG1B12
2–13	"Back to School"	November 15, 2003	IG1B13
2–15	"Friend in Need"	December 27, 2003	IG1B14
2–16	"Fireside Dinner"	January 17, 2004	IG1B15
2–17	"Farmstand Dinner"	February 7, 2004	IG1B16
2–18	"Chocolate Memories"	February 14, 2004	IG1B17

=== Season 3 ===
No.	Title	Original release date	Prod. code
3–01	"Hasta la Pizza Baby"	June 5, 2004	IG1C01
3–02	"Wedding Anniversary"	June 19, 2004	IG1C02
3–03	"Cooking Lite"	June 26, 2004	IG1C03
3–04	"Frozen Treats"	August 7, 2004	IG1C04
3–05	"Summer Beach BBQ"	August 28, 2004	IG1C05
3–06	"Sunshine Food"	September 4, 2004	IG1C06
3–07	"Italian for Beginners"	September 18, 2004	IG1C07
3–08	"Book Party"	September 25, 2004	IG1C08
3–09	"Chicken Story"	October 2, 2004	IG1C09
3–10	"Potluck"	October 16, 2004	IG1C10

=== Season 4 ===
No.	Title	Original release date	Prod. code
4–01	"Turkey: Not Just for Thanksgiving"	November 13, 2004	IG1D01
4–02	"Saturday Night, Sunday Breakfast"	November 27, 2004	IG1D02
4–03	"5 Day Make Ahead Dinner"	January 15, 2005	IG1D03
4–04	"Sweet Home Supper"	January 22, 2005	IG1D04
4–05	"Canapes and Canvases"	January 29, 2005	IG1D05
4–06	"Welcome Back Breakfast"	February 12, 2005	IG1D06
4–07	"Birthday Gift Dinner"	March 19, 2005	IG1D07
4–08	"French Made Easy"	March 26, 2005	IG1D08
4–09	"Bringing the Magic Home"	April 2, 2005	IG1D09
4–10	"Kids Picnic Party"	June 11, 2005	IG1D10

=== Season 5 ===
No.	Title	Original release date	Prod. code
5–01	"Housewarming Party"	June 18, 2005	IG1E01
5–02	"Friday Night Dinner"	June 25, 2005	IG1E02
5–03	"Dinner and a Movie"	July 5, 2005	IG1E03
5–04	"Lunch for the Boys"	July 23, 2005	IG1E04
5–05	"Fast and Elegant Supper"	July 30, 2005	IG1E05
5–06	"Working Girl"	August 20, 2005	IG1E06
5–07	"Cooking with Tess"	August 27, 2005	IG1E07
5–08	"Back From the Beach"	September 3, 2005	IG1E08
5–09	"Beach Volleyball Picnic"	September 10, 2005	IG1E09
5–10	"Barefoot Reunion"	October 8, 2005	IG1E10
5–11	"Pasta Bella"	October 29, 2005	IG1E11

=== Season 6 ===
No.	Title	Original release date	Prod. code
6–01	"Thanksgiving"	November 12, 2005	IG1F01
6–02	"Holiday Surprise"	December 3, 2005	IG1F02
6–03	"Supper in a Box"	January 21, 2006	IG1F03
6–04	"What Are Friends For?"	January 21, 2006	IG1F04
6–05	"Happy Ever After"	February 4, 2006	IG1F05
6–06	"Back for the Weekend"	February 25, 2006	IG1F06
6–07	"Long Island Food"	March 4, 2006	IG1F07
6–08	"Ladies Lunch"	March 11, 2006	IG1F08
6–09	"Long Distance Dinner"	April 8, 2006	IG1F09
6–10	"Rehearsal Dinner"	June 10, 2006	IG1F10
6–11	"Thank You Dinner"	June 17, 2006	IG1F11

=== Season 7 ===
No.	Title	Original release date	Prod. code
7–01	"Boss for Dinner"	June 26, 2006	IG1G01
7–02	"Jeffrey's Treat"	July 15, 2006	IG1G02
7–03	"Girls Day Off"	July 29, 2006	IG1G03
7–04	"LA Story"	August 12, 2006	IG1G04
7–05	"Jeffrey Home Alone"	August 26, 2006	IG1G05
7–06	"Good Home Cooking"	September 9, 2006	IG1G06
7–07	"Pooch Party"	September 23, 2006	IG1G07
7–08	"Ina's Take Out"	October 7, 2006	IG1G08
7–09	"Black and White Party"	November 25, 2006	IG1G09

=== Season 8 ===
No.	Title	Original release date	Prod. code
8–01	"Cookbook Party"	November 26, 2006	IG1H01
8–02	"Night Before Dinner"	December 3, 2006	IG1H02
8–03	"Going Going Gone"	January 6, 2007	IG1H03
8–04	"Tale of Two Soups"	January 13, 2007	IG1H04
8–05	"Breakfast, Lunch, and Dinner"	January 20, 2007	IG1H05
8–06	"Working Lunch"	February 10, 2007	IG1H06
8–07	"All Aboard"	February 17, 2007	IG1H07
8–08	"Bed and Breakfast"	March 3, 2007	IG1H08
8–09	"Flavors and Flowers"	March 17, 2007	IG1H09
8–10	"Photo Finish"	April 7, 2007	IG1H10
8–11	"Jeffrey's Surprise Party"	June 2, 2007	IG1H11

=== Season 9 ===
No.	Title	Original release date	Prod. code
9–01	"Shore Thing"	June 23, 2007	IG1I01
9–02	"Girls That Grill"	July 7, 2007	IG1I02
9–03	"Blueprint Lunch"	July 14, 2007	IG1I03
9–04	"Memory Lane"	July 21, 2007	IG1I04
9–05	"The Cat's Away"	August 11, 2007	IG1I05
9–06	"Good Catch"	August 25, 2007	IG1I06
9–07	"Breakfast In, Breakfast Out"	September 1, 2007	IG1I07
9–08	"Mystery Guest"	September 15, 2007	IG1I08
9–09	"It's Friday Night Again"	October 6, 2007	IG1I09
9–10	"Halloween for Grownups"	October 20, 2007	IG1I10

=== Season 10 ===
No.	Title	Original release date	Prod. code
10–01	"Festive Fun"	December 1, 2007	IG1J01
10–02	"Weekend Lunch"	January 5, 2008	IG1J02
10–03	"Pots & Plans"	January 12, 2008	IG1J03
10–04	"Home Comforts"	January 19, 2008	IG1J04
10–05	"Barn Warming"	January 26, 2008	IG1J05
10–06	"Anniversary"	February 2, 2008	IG1J06
10–07	"Ladies Who Lunch"	February 9, 2008	IG1J07
10–08	"Baby Shower"	February 16, 2008	IG1J08
10–09	"Dinner Date"	February 23, 2008	IG1J09
10–10	"Friends of Friends"	March 1, 2008	IG1J10

=== Season 11 ===
No.	Title	Original release date	Prod. code
11–01	"Steaks and Sides"	October 18, 2008	IG2A01
11–02	"Perfect Dinner Party"	October 25, 2008	IG2A02
11–03	"Chicken All the Time"	November 1, 2008	IG2A03
11–04	"Fired Up"	November 8, 2008	IG2A04
11–05	"Thanksgiving Countdown"	November 15, 2008	IG2A05
11–06	"Bread Winner"	November 22, 2008	IG2A06
11–07	"Breakfast Party"	November 29, 2008	IG2A07
11–08	"Cocktail Hour"	December 6, 2008	IG2A08
11–09	"Italian Every Time"	December 13, 2008	IG2A09
11–10	"Cooking for a Crowd"	December 20, 2008	IG2A10
11–11	"Pot Luck Dinner"	January 17, 2009	IG2A11
11–12	"Say Cheese"	January 24, 2009	IG2A12
11–13	"Turning Up the Volume"	February 7, 2009	IG2A13
11–14	"Food with Love"	February 14, 2009	IG2A14
11–15	"Barefoot Classics"	February 21, 2009	IG2A15
11–16	"Oven Rules"	February 28, 2009	IG2A16
11–17	"The Magic Factor"	March 7, 2009	IG2A17
11–18	"Impromptu Dinner"	March 14, 2009	IG1B18

=== Season 12 ===
No.	Title	Original release date	Prod. code
12–01	"Barefoot to Go"	July 18, 2009	IG2B01
12–02	"The Flame Game"	July 25, 2009	IG2B02
12–03	"Herb Hall of Fame"	August 1, 2009	IG2B03
12–04	"Go Greek"	August 8, 2009	IG2B04
12–05	"What Are Friends For"	August 15, 2009	IG2B05
12–06	"Birthday Breakfast BBQ"	August 22, 2009	IG2B06
12–07	"Perfect Pasta"	August 29, 2009	IG2B07
12–08	"Keep It Sweet"	October 24, 2009	IG2B08
12–09	"Pizza Party"	November 7, 2009	IG2B09
12–10	"Thanksgiving 2.0"	November 14, 2009	IG2B10
12–11	"Perfect Holiday Dinner"	December 5, 2009	IG2B11
12–12	"Feature Flavor"	January 9, 2010	IG2B12
12–13	"Chicken 101"	January 16, 2010	IG2B13
12–14	"Farm Stand Food"	January 23, 2010	IG2B14
12–15	"Get Grilling"	January 30, 2010	IG2B15
12–16	"Baking Basics"	February 6, 2010	IG2B16
12–17	"Italian Restaurant Food at Home"	February 27, 2010	IG2B17
12–18	"Surprise Surprise"	March 6, 2010	IG1B18
12–19	"Outdoor Entertaining"	March 20, 2010	IG1B19
12–20	"Thanksgiving Pot Luck"	November 20, 2010	IG1B20

=== Season 13 ===
No.	Title	Original release date	Prod. code
13–01	"Birthday Parties"	May 29, 2010	IG2C01
13–02	"Tex Mex"	June 5, 2010	IG2C02
13–03	"Cooking With Wine"	June 12, 2010	IG2C03
13–04	"International Pasta"	June 19, 2010	IG2C04
13–05	"Cooking with Rice"	June 26, 2010	IG2C05
13–06	"High Wire Egg Dishes"	July 3, 2010	IG2C06
13–07	"Perfect French Dinner Party"	July 17, 2010	IG2C07
13–08	"Cooking for Beginners"	August 28, 2010	IG2C08
13–09	"All About Chocolate"	October 23, 2010	IG2C09
13–10	"Perfect Cocktail Party"	November 27, 2010	IG2C10

=== Season 14 ===
No.	Title	Original release date	Prod. code
14–01	"Herb Story"	January 8, 2011	IG2D01
14–02	"Going Local"	January 15, 2011	IG2D02
14–03	"Sweet Charity"	January 22, 2011	IG2D03
14–04	"Jeffrey's Dinner"	January 29, 2011	IG2D04
14–05	"Old School Retro Mix"	February 5, 2011	IG2D05
14–06	"Easy French"	February 26, 2011	IG2D06
14–08	"Easy Desserts"	March 5, 2011	IG2D08
14–09	"Italian Old and New"	April 16, 2011	IG2D09
14–10	"Afternoon Tea to Go"	May 21, 2011	IG2D10

=== Season 15 ===
No.	Title	Original release date	Prod. code
15–01	"Summertime Easy"	July 2, 2011	IG2E01
15–02	"Flour Power"	July 9, 2011	IG2E02
15–03	"Buon Appetito"	July 16, 2011	IG2E03
15–04	"Market Day"	August 6, 2011	IG2E04
15–05	"Post Cards from Paris"	August 13, 2011	IG2E05
15–06	"Make It Fast"	August 20, 2011	IG2E06
15–07	"BC Burger Joint"	September 3, 2011	IG2E08
15–08	"How the Cookie Crumbles"	September 17, 2011	IG2E09
15–09	"Just Candy"	October 22, 2011	IG2E09
15–10	"Shake It Up"	December 3, 2011	IG2E10

=== Season 16 ===
No.	Title	Original release date	Prod. code
16–01	"Miguel While You Were Out"	January 21, 2012	IG2F01
16–02	"Drill Dinner"	January 28, 2012	IG2F02
16–03	"Cooking With Friends"	February 4, 2012	IG2F03
16–04	"Rehearsal Dinner"	February 11, 2012	IG2F04
16–05	"Dare to be Different"	February 18, 2012	IG2F05
16–06	"Modern Comfort"	February 25, 2012	IG2F06
16–07	"Jeffrey's Birthday Pop-Up"	March 3, 2012	IG2F07
16–08	"Brunch Bunch"	March 10, 2012	IG2F08
16–09	"School Today"	March 24, 2012	IG2F09
16–10	"Baby's First Bash"	March 31, 2012	IG2F10

=== Season 17 ===
No.	Title	Original release date	Prod. code
17–01	"Training Day Dinner"	June 16, 2012	IG2G01
17–02	"Barefoot Bistro"	June 30, 2012	IG2G02
17–03	"Fruit All Ways"	July 7, 2012	IG2G03
17–04	"Elmo's Day Out"	August 18, 2012	IG2G04
17–05	"Off Duty"	August 25, 2012	IG2G05
17–06	"Eat Your Greens"	September 8, 2012	IG2G06
17–07	"Cheesy Does It"	September 15, 2012	IG2G07
17–08	"Back to Brooklyn"	December 1, 2012	IG2G09

=== Season 18 ===
No.	Title	Original release date	Prod. code
18–01	"The Adventure Begins"	January 12, 2013	IG2H01
18–02	"Good Stuff"	January 19, 2013	IG2H02
18–03	"Eat Like a Local"	January 26, 2013	IG2H03
18–04	"Dinner in Napa"	February 2, 2013	IG2H04
18–05	"Food Adventures"	February 9, 2013	IG2H05
18–06	"Library Inaugural Drinks"	March 9, 2013	IG2H06
18–07	"Perfect Day in East Hampton"	March 16, 2013	IG2H07
18–08	"Game Plan"	March 23, 2013	IG2H08
18–09	"Birthday Surprise"	March 30, 2013	IG2H09
18–10	"Local Food Heroes"	April 6, 2013	IG2H10

=== Season 19 ===
No.	Title	Original release date	Prod. code
19–01	"Old New York"	June 29, 2013	IG2I01
19–02	"What's Cooking in Brooklyn"	July 6, 2013	IG2I02
19–03	"Heard It on the Grapevine"	July 13, 2013	IG2I03
19–04	"All Change"	July 20, 2013	IG2I04
19–05	"Fun in the City"	July 27, 2013	IG2I05
19–06	"Cooking With Giada De Laurentiis"	August 10, 2013	IG2I06
19–07	"Cooking With Tyler Florence"	August 24, 2013	IG2I07
19–08	"Best Barefoot Grilling"	August 31, 2013	IG2I08
19–09	"Cooking With Michael Symon"	September 14, 2013	IG2I09
19–10	"Best Barefoot Chocolate Desserts"	October 26, 2013	IG2I10

=== Season 20 ===
No.	Title	Original release date	Prod. code
20–01	"Welcome to Town Party"	January 26, 2014	IG2J01
20–02	"Surprise Italian Party"	February 2, 2014	IG2J02
20–03	"Wedding Anniversary"	February 9, 2014	IG2J03
20–04	"Birthday Boat Party"	February 16, 2014	IG2J04
20–05	"Cocktails for a Crowd"	March 2, 2014	IG2J05

=== Season 21 ===
No.	Title	Original release date	Prod. code
21–01	"Cocktails and Cookies"	July 20, 2014	IG2I01
21–02	"Easy as Pie"	July 27, 2014	IG2I02
21–03	"Bread and Butter"	August 3, 2014	IG2I03
21–04	"Barbecues and Bouquets"	August 10, 2014	IG2I04
21–05	"Best of Barefoot: Cheese"	August 17, 2013	IG2I05
21–06	"Potluck Party"	August 24, 2014	IG2I06
21–07	"Best of Barefoot: Dessert"	October 26, 2014	IG2I07

=== Season 22 ===
No.	Title	Original release date	Prod. code
22–01	"Cooking for Jeffrey: Jeffrey's Birthday Dinner"	October 16, 2016	IG2K0
22–02	"Cooking for Jeffrey: Deans for Dinner"	October 23, 2016	IG2K02
22–03	"Cooking for Jeffrey: Pizza Pronto"	October 30, 2016	IG2K03
22–04	"Barefoot in Washington, D.C."	November 5, 2016	IG2K04
22–05	"Cooking for Jeffrey: It Must Be Friday"	November 6, 2016	IG2K05
22–06	"Cooking for Jeffrey: Back to School Surprise"	November 13, 2016	IG2K06
22–07	"Cooking for Jeffrey: Dinner Party 101"	November 26, 2016	IG2K07
22–08	"Cooking for Jeffrey: Big Breakfast Buffet"	December 4, 2016	IG2K08
22–09	"Cooking for Jeffrey: Weekend Guest"	December 11, 2016	IG2K09

=== Season 23 ===
No.	Title	Original release date	Prod. code
23–01	"Cook Like a Pro: Chicken"	May 28, 2017	IG2L01
23–02	"Cook Like a Pro: Weeknight Dinners"	June 4, 2017	IG2L02
23–03	"Cook Like a Pro: Pasta"	June 11, 2017	IG2L03
23–04	"Cook Like a Pro: Fearless Food"	June 18, 2017	IG2L04
23–05	"Cook Like a Pro: Make-Ahead Desserts"	June 25, 2017	IG2L05
23–06	"Cook Like a Pro: Eggs"	July 2, 2017	IG2L06
23–07	"Cook Like a Pro: Chocolate"	July 9, 2017	IG2L07
23–08	"Cook Like a Pro: Roasted Vegetables"	July 16, 2017	IG2L08

=== Season 24 ===
No.	Title	Original release date	Prod. code
24–01	"Cook Like a Pro: Bread Winners"	March 11, 2018	IG2M01
24–02	"Cook Like a Pro: Make-Ahead Breakfast"	March 18, 2018	IG2M02
24–03	"Cook Like a Pro: No Sides Required"	March 25, 2018	IG2M03
24–04	"Cook Like a Pro: Parmesan"	April 1, 2018	IG2M04
24–05	"Cook Like a Pro: Good Vanilla"	April 8, 2018	IG2M05
24–06	"Cook Like a Pro: Tipsy Desserts"	April 15, 2018	IG2M06
24–07	"Cook Like a Pro: Simply French"	April 22, 2018	IG2M07
24–08	"Cook Like a Pro: American Classics"	April 29, 2018	IG2M08

=== Season 25 ===
No.	Title	Original release date	Prod. code
25–01	"Cook Like a Pro: Easy High Low"	October 21, 2018	IG2N01
25–02	"Cook Like a Pro: Good Ingredients"	October 28, 2018	IG2N02
25–03	"Cook Like a Pro: Salads for Four Seasons"	November 4, 2018	IG2N03
25–04	"Cook Like a Pro: Make-Ahead Thanksgiving"	November 11, 2018	IG2N04
25–05	"Cook Like a Pro: Thanksgiving Sides"	November 17, 2018	IG2N05
25–06	"Cook Like a Pro: Beefed Up"	November 18, 2018	IG2N06
25–07	"Cook Like a Pro: Cocktail Party Rules"	November 25, 2018	IG2N07
25–08	"Cook Like a Pro: Celebration Sides"	December 2, 2018	IG2N08
25–09	"Cook Like a Pro: Mary Poppins Show"	December 9, 2018	IG2N09

=== Specials ===
No.	Title	Original release date	Prod. code
1–14	"A Barefoot Contessa Summer Weekend"	March 8, 2003	IGSP02
1–15	"Barefoot in Paris"	March 15, 2003	IGSP03
2–14	"A Barefoot Contessa Holiday"	December 3, 2003	IGSP01
