= Barefoot Contessa =

American television Food Network cooking show

- Genre: Cooking show
- Created by: Ina Garten
- Starring: Ina Garten
- Country of origin: United States
- No. of seasons: 29
- No. of episodes: 297

Production
- Producer: Pacific
- Production locations: East Hampton, New York, U.S.
- Running time: 20–23 minutes

Original release
- Network: Food Network
- Release: November 30, 2002 – December 19, 2021

Barefoot Contessa is an American cooking show that aired from November 30, 2002 to December 19, 2021, on Food Network. Hosted by celebrity chef Ina Garten, each episode features Garten assembling dishes of varying complexity. Though her specialty is French cuisine, she occasionally prepares American, Asian, British, or Italian foods. Her show also gives tips on decorating and entertaining.

The show's title, which comes from the Italian word for countess, was originally used by Garten in her best-selling cookbook, The Barefoot Contessa Cookbook (1999). The cookbook was in turn named after Garten's specialty food store, which she bought already named in 1978. The store, which is no longer in operation, opened in 1975 and was named after the 1954 film of the same name. Garten sold the store to the employees prior to its closure.

== Overview ==
Garten's show features the preparation of a simple multi-course meal, usually for her close friends, colleagues, or husband, Jeffrey. Her recipes often include fresh herbs, which she 'hand-harvests' from her backyard garden. Table settings include both simple and comfort dishes, and are often accompanied by her 'own' flowers or those brought in by Michael Grim, a friend and local florist who is frequently on the show.

Garten deconstructs simple French recipes like boeuf bourguignon or Baba au Rhum cake. She focuses on preparing foods efficiently, allowing more time to eat and spend with guests.

The show is mainly recorded in Garten's home in East Hampton, New York and features fast-moving camera shots and closeups (e.g., fully ripened fruits, eggs falling from the shells, or bubbling pots of homemade stock).

== Episode guide ==
Season	Episodes	Originally released	
Season	Episodes	First released	Last released
1	13	November 30, 2002	March 1, 2003
2	18	June 14, 2003	February 14, 2004
3	10	June 5, 2004	October 16, 2004
4	10	November 13, 2004	June 11, 2005
5	11	June 18, 2005	October 29, 2005
6	11	November 12, 2005	June 17, 2006
7	9	June 26, 2006	November 25, 2006
8	11	November 26, 2006	June 2, 2007
9	10	June 23, 2007	October 20, 2007
10	10	December 1, 2007	March 1, 2008
11	18	October 18, 2008	March 14, 2009
12	20	July 18, 2009	November 20, 2010
13	10	May 29, 2010	November 27, 2011
14	10	January 8, 2011	May 21, 2011
15	10	July 2, 2011	December 3, 2011
16	10	January 1, 2012	May 22, 2012
17	8	June 16, 2012	December 1, 2012
18	10	January 12, 2013	April 6, 2013
19	10	June 29, 2013	October 26, 2013
20	5	January 26, 2014	March 2, 2014
21	7	July 20, 2014	October 26, 2014
22	9	October 16, 2016	December 11, 2016
23	8	May 28, 2017	July 16, 2017
24	8	March 11, 2018	April 29, 2018
25	9	October 21, 2018	December 9, 2018
Specials	3	March 8, 2003	December 3, 2013

== International airings ==
Barefoot Contessa airs in Australia on Food Network (Australia) and the Lifestyle Food Channel on the Foxtel platform, in the UK on the Food Network UK, in Poland on the channel Kuchnia.tv, and in the Middle East on the Fatafeat Channel.

== Awards and nominations ==
The show was nominated for a Daytime Emmy Award in 2005 in the category Best Service Show; in the year 2009, it was once again nominated for a Daytime Emmy Award in the categories of Outstanding Culinary Program and Best Culinary Host; Garten won her first Emmy in the latter category.

Year	Association	Category	Result
2005	Daytime Emmy Awards	Outstanding Service Show	Nominated
2007	Daytime Emmy Awards	Outstanding Lifestyle Program	Nominated
2008	Daytime Emmy Awards	Outstanding Lifestyle Host — Ina Garten	Nominated
2009	Daytime Emmy Awards	Outstanding Culinary Program	Nominated
2009	Daytime Emmy Awards	Outstanding Lifestyle/Culinary Host — Ina Garten	Won
2010	Daytime Emmy Awards	Outstanding Lifestyle/Culinary Host — Ina Garten	Won
2015	Daytime Emmy Awards	Outstanding Culinary Program	Won
2016	New York Festivals	Culinary Program (Rusty Medal)	Won
2017	James Beard Awards	Special (TV or Web)	Nominated
2021	Daytime Emmy Awards	Outstanding Culinary Program	Won
2021	Daytime Emmy Awards	Outstanding Culinary Host — Ina Garten	Won
