= The Tony Danza Show =

The Tony Danza Show may refer to:

- The Tony Danza Show (1997 TV series), a 1997 NBC sitcom starring Danza
- The Tony Danza Show (2004 talk show), a 2004 syndicated talk show hosted by Danza
