= Brandon McMillan (animal trainer) =

American animal trainer and TV personality

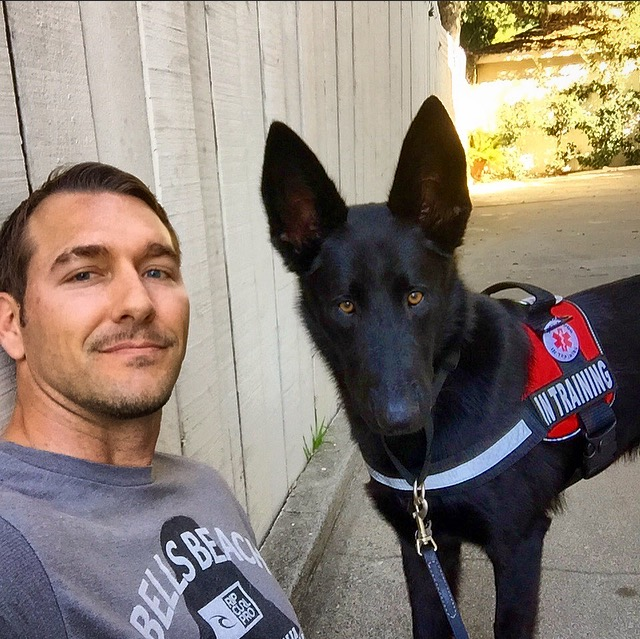
- McMillan and service dog Atlas
- Born: April 29, 1977 (age 48); Trenton, New Jersey, US
- Other names: Animal Brandon
- Occupations: Animal Trainer, Television Host, Author, Entrepreneur; Host of CBS Show, Lucky Dog
- Known for: Lucky Dog, Shark Week
- Height: 6 ft 3 in (191 cm)

Brandon McMillan (born April 29, 1977) is an American television personality, animal trainer, author and television producer best known for his role as host and dog trainer of the television series Lucky Dog on CBS.

== Early life and career ==
McMillan was born April 29, 1977, in Trenton, New Jersey. His father and uncle were both exotic animal trainers in the entertainment industry. As a child Brandon was raised around a variety of wild animals including big cats, bears, primates, wolves, birds of prey, elephants and many more.

At 18, McMillan moved to Los Angeles to work for his uncle's animal training company, which supplied animals for film and television. His first experience in front of the camera came in 2009, when he hosted the Animal Planet series NIGHT, which looked at nocturnal behavior of the world's most dangerous animals.

In 2010 McMillan opened a dog boarding and training facility outside Los Angeles, and began work training service dogs and therapy dogs. He has been a dog trainer to the stars at this location; some of his clients have included Ellen DeGeneres, Andy Cohen, Don Cheadle, James Caan, Hugh Hefner, Ronda Rousey, Chris Hardwick, Wolfgang Puck and Kate Hudson.

== Lucky Dog and other projects ==
In the winter of 2012, McMillan was discovered by Litton Entertainment. Development on Lucky Dog, where McMillan would rescue unadoptable dogs deemed "untrainable" from city shelters, rehabilitate them, train them and find them forever homes, began in the spring of 2013. Lucky Dog premiered that fall on CBS Dream Team. In 2015, McMillan won the Daytime Emmy Award for "Best Host in a Lifestyle Series" for Lucky Dog. In 2016 Lucky Dog won the Daytime Emmy Award for Outstanding Special Class Series. In 2018 he won another Daytime Emmy Award for "Best Host in a Lifestyle Series" for Lucky Dog. On October 24, 2020, he announced on his Facebook page the 182nd episode of the show would be his last as host.

McMillan also hosts a continuing documentary on Discovery Channel's Shark Week called Great White Serial Killer, where he investigates shark attacks along coastlines where attacks are common. Although the title was controversial, several top marine biologists praised the documentary. McMillan has been diving with sharks for most of his career.

== Personal life ==
Brandon is married to Jessica Morris McMillan, a surgical technician from Huntington Beach, CA. The couple live in Jupiter, Florida. They have a son named Parrish Daniel McMillan. McMillan divides his time between Jupiter, Los Angeles and New York City. He is the author of "Lucky Dog Lessons: Train Your Dog in 7 Days" (HarperCollins), which is a self-help book for dog lovers. He had a chihuahua named Lulu and a Flat-Coated Retriever named Koda. In his free time McMillan scuba dives, surfs, and practices Brazilian Jiu Jitsu.
