= Giada's Weekend Getaways =

- Starring: Giada De Laurentiis
- Country of origin: United States
- No. of seasons: 2
- No. of episodes: 26

Production
- Running time: 30 minutes

Original release
- Network: Food Network

Giada's Weekend Getaways is a show on the Food Network that ran from 2007 to 2008. The show follows chef Giada De Laurentiis around the U.S. for "3 day weekend adventures." The show begins Friday afternoon, as Giada arrives at her destination. She may begin with a light dinner, appetizer, and a cocktail. The bulk of the show happens on Saturday, beginning with a breakfast, some sight-seeing or activity, lunch, followed by another round of activity and finishes off with dinner, in which she goes all out, dresses up and has a night on the town. The show wraps up on Sunday with brunch and one last activity. As of 2012 the show was rerun on the Cooking Channel.

== Season one ==
"Seattle": Cities and towns across the country are visited to seek out the best local food stops and activities. First up: Seattle's dining scene is explored with host Giada De Laurentiis. Included: French toast on a ferry ride; a martini happy hour; mini burgers. Aired January 12, 2007.

"Miami": The local fare of Miami's South Beach offers stone crabs and yellow tail snapper. Also: a hidden Italian restaurant. Giada also goes out for salsa lessons. Aired January 12, 2007.

"Los Angeles": Host Giada De Laurentiis lays out the perfect step-by-step three-day holiday in her own howetown, sunny Los Angeles. From a Friday cruise up the Pacific Coast Highway for the ultimate sunset sangria to a Sunday helicopter ride for fish and chips on the island of Catalina, Giada has a packed food weekend planned. Aired January 19, 2007.

"Jackson Hole": Giada De Laurentiis saddles up for the perfect food-filled weekend in the Old West, Jackson Hole, Wyoming. From a spicy Mexican hot chocolate to a real cowboy breakfast, it's a weekend of exploring the mountains and savoring great food. Aired January 26, 2007.

"New York City": Giada discovers the charm of the boroughs outside Manhattan as she dines in some of Brooklyn's hot spots and best kept secrets on a weekend in the Big Apple. February 2, 2007

"Santa Fe": Giada pays homage to the arts on a visit to Santa Fe. Highlights from the weekend include a chocolate artist, a pottery class and a tasting of Mexican flavors. February 9, 2007

"San Francisco": Giada has a weekend of food and fun in the bay that includes a game of bocce and a trip to the famous Ferry Building Marketplace. February 16, 2007

"Austin": Giada tastes steak, barbecue and other Texan treats when she visits one of the Lone Star State's trendiest cities. February 23, 2007

"Charleston, SC": Giada samples food and dabbles in ghost hunting in Charleston, SC, purportedly one of America's most haunted cities. March 9, 2007

"Napa/Sonoma":Giada enjoys a hot air balloon ride and olive oil tasting on a visit to California's wine country.March 16, 2007

"Chicago": Giada finds that variety is the spice of life when she samples the wide range of cuisines in the Windy City. March 30, 2007

"Newport, RI": Giada goes sailing and takes a scooter ride between bites in the seaside town of Newport, Rhode Island. April 6, 2007

"Los Cabos": Giada tastes tequila and experiences Spanish colonial architecture when she heads south of the border for a weekend of Mexican flavor. April 20, 2007

== Season two ==
New Orleans: Giada visits the Big Easy, eating crawfish, taking a swamp tour, and building houses for Katrina victims. Original air date, July 13, 2007

Washington, D.C.: Giada balances fine dining and historic landmarks in a weekend tour of the U.S. capital city. Original air date, July 24, 2007

Santa Barbara: Giada hits the road and takes a scenic drive up the California coast to Santa Barbara for a weekend on the beach. Original air date, July 31, 2007

London: Giada pairs historic sights with modern flavors in London, England. Original air date, August 7, 2007

Paris: On a weekend trip to the City of Light, Giada visits some of her favorite haunts from her days at Le Cordon Bleu, including the acclaimed culinary school itself. Original air date, August 14, 2007

Las Vegas: Giada drives a race car and takes a helicopter ride over the Las Vegas Strip on a visit to Sin City. Original air date, August 31, 2007

Martha's Vineyard: Giada enjoys a refreshing, seafood-filled weekend on the shores of Martha's Vineyard. Original air date, November 2, 2007

Colorado Rockies: Giada tries some of the eclectic tastes of Colorado on a trip to Denver and Beaver Creek. Original air date, November 9, 2007

The Hamptons: Giada tastes her way through the Long Island's upscale Hamptons communities. Original air date, November 23, 2007

Boston: Giada visits a bakery, takes in a Red Sox game and dines at local restaurants during a weekend in Boston. Original air date, November 30, 2007

Bermuda: Giada swims with dolphins, explores caves and dines on seafood and rum cake during a weekend excursion to Bermuda. Original air date, January 20, 2008

Vancouver: Giada finds adventure and fabulous food when she visits Vancouver, Canada. Original air date, January 27, 2008

Maui: Giada appreciates the sun, surf, scenery and snacks of Maui over a weekend on the Hawaiian island. Original air date, February 24, 2008
