= Hutchinson House (Edisto Island, South Carolina) =

Historic house in South Carolina, United States

- U.S. National Register of Historic Places
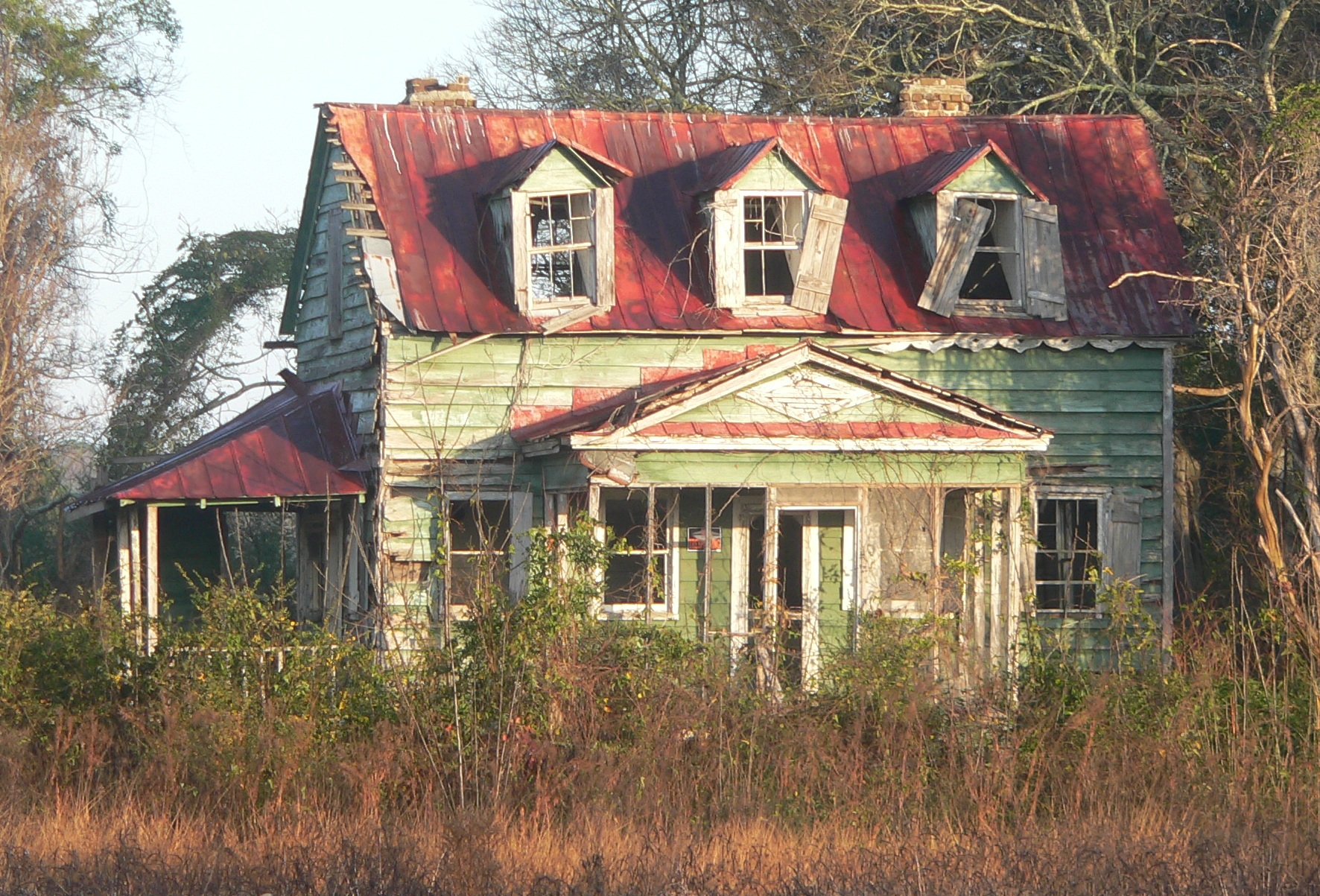
- Hutchinson House, photographed in 2013

- Location within South Carolina Location within the United States
- Location: 7666 Point of Pines Rd., Edisto Island, South Carolina
- Coordinates: 32°34′11″N 80°15′25.45″W
- Built: c. 1885
- NRHP reference No.: 86003218
- Added to NRHP: May 5, 1987

The Hutchinson House is the oldest identified house on Edisto Island, South Carolina associated with the black community after the American Civil War. It was the residence of Henry Hutchinson, a freedman who was a noteworthy post-war Sea Island Cotton planter.

== History ==
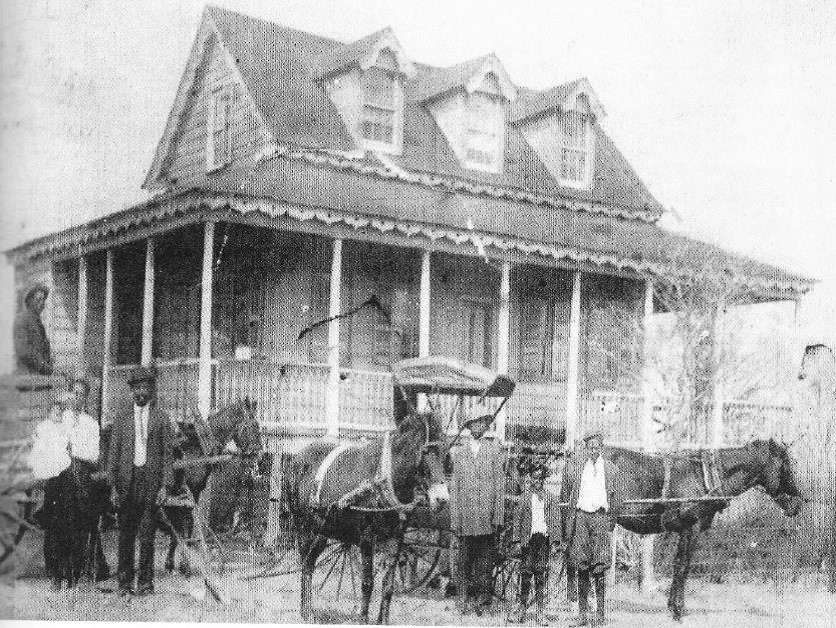
The Hutchinson House as it was originally constructed, circa 1900.

Following the Civil War, Jim Hutchinson worked to assemble groups of freed blacks who would collectively purchase land on Edisto Island. Each contributor then received a fractional interest in the lands acquired. Jim Hutchinson's children built their own homes and farms on the land Jim had acquired. One of his children was Henry Hutchinson. Henry Hutchinson's house is the only one remaining. Henry Hutchinson is said to have built the house at the time of his marriage to Rosa Swinton in 1885 and resided here until his death in 1940. This home, like many other homes built during that time, reflected the pride and independence for the new black farmers and the Edisto community after the Civil War. This custom well-crafted home was built barely 20 years after the Civil War ended by Henry Hutchinson, his half-brother Jack Miller, and their uncle John Pearson Hutchinson (who was an unlicensed black architect).

Henry was a noteworthy post-war Sea Island Cotton planter and was recorded in the News and Courier in 1905 & 1909 as having brought the first bag to the Charleston market for several years running. Henry consigned his crop to Dill, Ball & Company who was his factor. Henry owned and operated a cotton gin on the island from about 1900 into the 1920s. The gin was located in a cotton house adjacent to his home. The cotton house was formerly a part of Clark Plantation and adjacent to the Clark Plantation house. Henry purchased and refurbished the building after the Civil War. The cotton gin he operated was notably a McCarthy gin powered by a coal-fired steam engine. Henry ginned his own Sea Island Cotton crop and the cotton produced by other freedmen on Edisto Island from about 1900 into the 1920s. Henry consigned not only his own crop but that of his neighbor's whose cotton he ginned, acting as an intermediary for sales and loans for his neighbors and Dill, Ball & Co. When the Boll Weevil destroyed the crop's viability on Edisto in the early 1920s, Henry continued to plant the cash crop in some capacity and was recorded in the Charleston Evening Post on June 8, 1930, as having grown the first cotton blossoms of the year for South Carolina. The Hutchinson House is considered one of many symbols of hard work, self-reliance, and success for Edisto's emerging African American community.

== Preservation ==
The house was listed in the National Register of Historic Places in 1987. The house and property were purchased by the Edisto Island Open Land Trust, a local non-profit land conservation organization, in 2016. EIOLT began stabilization of the structure in 2017 by installing heavy beams to support the structure's fragile walls. In the next phase of restoration, the structure's porch and detailing will be restored. Restoration is expected to be complete by 2022 depending on funding.
