= Everyday Italian =

- Created by: Irene Wong
- Starring: Giada De Laurentiis
- Country of origin: United States
- Original language: English
- No. of seasons: 12
- No. of episodes: 212

Production
- Running time: 30 minutes

Original release
- Network: Food Network
- Release: April 5, 2003

Everyday Italian is a Food Network show hosted by Giada De Laurentiis. In the show, De Laurentiis taught viewers about traditional Italian cuisine with American influences.

== Production ==
The show was recorded in rented homes in Malibu, Pasadena and the Pacific Palisades, rather than a traditional set. All of the cooking on the show was shot live on set during an initial run and later the close up shots were recorded during a second run.

De Laurentiis often featured family members in episodes, most notably her husband, fashion designer Todd Thompson. Her mother, aunt, brother, and sister also appeared in several episodes, occasionally working with De Laurentiis in the kitchen. Giada's Aunt Raffy was the family member featured most often on the show; bringing recipes for such specialties as Chestnut Stuffing and Turkey Tonnato. Just before the birth of her first child in February 2008, De Laurentis made an announcement on the Food Network website that the show was no longer being produced.

== Awards and honors ==
The show was nominated for two Daytime Emmy Awards in 2006, as well as in 2007. Giada de Laurentis won a Daytime Emmy Award for Outstanding Lifestyle Host, and the series won the Daytime Emmy Award for Outstanding Lifestyle Program in 2008.

The show has also given rise to other shows starring De Laurentiis, including Giada's Weekend Getaways, Behind the Bash, and a number of specials, including Giada's Italian Holiday, featuring chef Mario Batali.

The success of Everyday Italian has led to the publication of three related cookbooks, Everyday Italian: 125 Simple and Delicious Recipes, Giada's Family Dinners, and Everyday Pasta.
