= List of awards and nominations received by Shonda Rhimes =

Shonda Rhimes awards and nominations
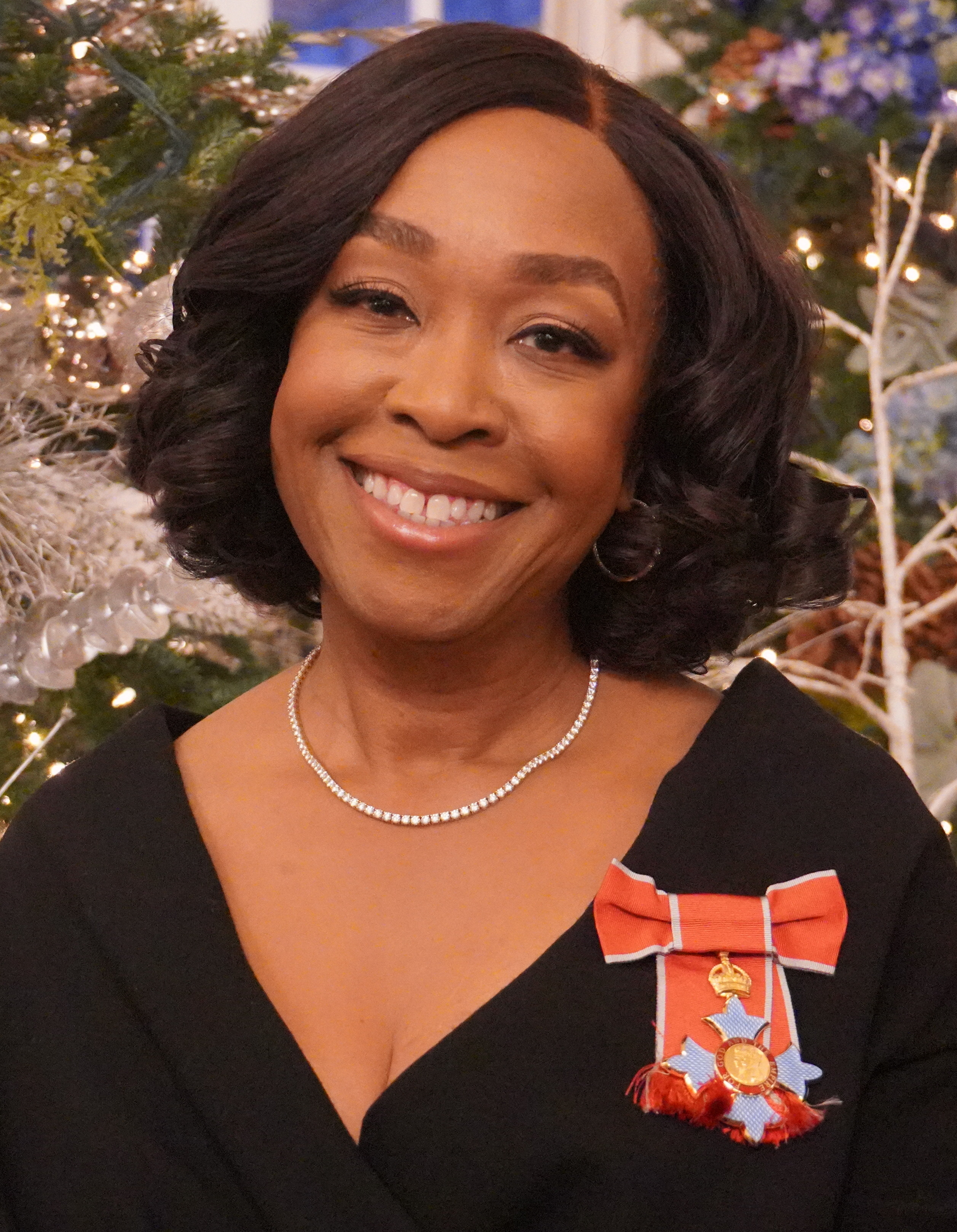
- Shonda Rhimes receives her Honorary Most Excellent Order of the British Empire (CBE) for services to UK/US Relations
Awards and nominations
| Award | Wins | Nominations |
| BAFTA Television Awards | 1 | 1 |
| Black Reel Award | 2 | 4 |
| Daytime Emmy Awards | 1 | 1 |
| Golden Globe Awards | 1 | 2 |
| NAACP Image Award | 9 | 15 |
| International Emmy Awards | 1 | 1 |
| Primetime Emmy Awards | 0 | 5 |

Totals (Note: Certain award groups do not simply award one winner. They acknowledge several different recipients, have runners-up, and have third place. Since this is a specific recognition and is different from losing an award, runner-up mentions are considered wins in this award tally. For simplification and to avoid errors, each award in this list has been presumed to have had a prior nomination.)
- Wins: 24
- Nominations: 45

This is a list of awards and nominations received by American television producer and screenwriter Shonda Rhimes.

Showrunner—creator, head writer, and executive producer of the medical drama Grey's Anatomy (2005–present), she received three nominations at the Golden Globe Awards, winning once for Best Television Series – Drama, and three nominations at the Primetime Emmy Awards. She has also won five NAACP Image Awards for Outstanding Drama Series, a Producers Guild of America Award, and the Writers Guild of America Award for Television: New Series. She also created the Grey's Anatomy's spin-off Private Practice (2007–2013), for which she won the NAACP Image Award for Outstanding Writing in a Dramatic Series.

She produced Scandal (2012–2018) and since 2020, she has been executive producer and writer of the historical fiction-romance series Bridgerton, earning a nomination for the Primetime Emmy Award for Outstanding Drama Series for the latter. She then produced its spin-off Queen Charlotte: A Bridgerton Story (2023), for which she won a Black Reel Award.

She was inducted into the Television Hall of Fame and NAB Broadcasting Hall of Fame. In 2016, Rhimes was honored with the International Emmy Founders Award and with a British Academy Television Special Award. Thanks to her production company Shondaland, she was awarded with a Peabody Award and won a Daytime Emmy Award for the documentary Black Barbie: A Documentary (2023).

== Major associations ==
=== BAFTA Awards ===
| Year | Category | Work | Result | Ref. |
British Academy Television Awards
| 2023 | Special Award | Herself | Won | |

=== Golden Globe Awards ===
| Year | Category | Work | Result | Ref. |
|---|---|---|---|---|
| 2006 | Best Television Series – Drama | Grey's Anatomy | Nominated | |
| 2007 | Best Television Series – Drama | Grey's Anatomy | Won | |
| 2008 | Best Television Series – Drama | Grey's Anatomy | Nominated | |

=== Emmy Award ===
| Year | Category | Work | Result | Ref. |
Daytime Emmy Awards
| 2025 | Outstanding Arts and Popular Culture Program | Black Barbie: A Documentary | Won | |
International Emmy Awards
| 2016 | Founders Award | Herself | Honoree | |
Primetime Emmy Awards
| 2006 | Outstanding Drama Series | Grey's Anatomy | Nominated | |
| 2006 | Outstanding Writing for a Drama Series | Grey's Anatomy (for "It's the End of the World" / "As We Know It") | Nominated | |
| 2007 | Outstanding Drama Series | Grey's Anatomy | Nominated | |
| 2021 | Outstanding Drama Series | Bridgerton | Nominated | |
| 2021 | Outstanding Limited Or Anthology Series | Inventing Anna | Nominated | |
Television Hall of Fame
| 2017 | Hall of Fame | Herself | Honoree | |

== Other awards and nominations ==
=== American Film Institute Awards ===
| Year | Category | Work | Result | Ref. |
|---|---|---|---|---|
| 2005 | Television Program of the Year | Grey's Anatomy | Won | |

=== Banff Television Festival ===
| Year | Category | Nominated work | Result | Ref. |
|---|---|---|---|---|
| 2011 | Best Continuing Series | Grey's Anatomy | Nominated | |

=== Black Reel Award ===
| Year | Category | Work | Result | Ref. |
|---|---|---|---|---|
| 2005 | Best Screenplay, Adapted or Original | The Princess Diaries 2: Royal Engagement | Nominated | |
| 2023 | Outstanding Drama Series | Queen Charlotte: A Bridgerton Story | Nominated | |
| 2023 | Outstanding Writing in a Drama Series | Queen Charlotte: A Bridgerton Story | Won | |
| 2024 | Diahann Carroll Executive Award | Herself | Honoree | |

=== Costume Designers Guild Awards ===
| Year | Category | Work | Result | Ref. |
|---|---|---|---|---|
| 2021 | Distinguished Collaborator Award | Herself | Won | |

=== Directors Guild of America Award ===
| Year | Category | Work | Result | Ref. |
|---|---|---|---|---|
| 2014 | DGA Diversity Award | Shonda Rhimes | Won | |

=== GLAAD Media Awards ===
| Year | Category | Work | Result | Ref. |
|---|---|---|---|---|
| 2012 | Golden Gate Award | Shonda Rhimes | Won | |

=== ICG Publicists Awards ===
| Year | Category | Work | Result | Ref. |
|---|---|---|---|---|
| 2014 | Diversity Award | Herself | Won | |

=== NAB Broadcasting Hall of Fame ===
| Year | Work | Result | Ref. |
|---|---|---|---|
| 2015 | Herself | Honoree | |

=== NAACP Image Award ===
| Year | Category | Work | Result | Ref. |
|---|---|---|---|---|
| 2006 | Outstanding Drama Series | Grey's Anatomy | Won | |
| 2007 | Outstanding Drama Series | Grey's Anatomy | Won | |
| 2007 | Outstanding Writing in a Dramatic Series | Grey's Anatomy (for "It's the End of the World") | Won | |
| 2008 | Outstanding Drama Series | Grey's Anatomy | Won | |
| 2008 | Outstanding Writing in a Dramatic Series | Grey's Anatomy (for "A Change is Gonna Come") | Won | |
| 2008 | Outstanding Writing in a Dramatic Series | Private Practice (for "In Which We Meet Addison, a Nice Girl From Somewhere Else") | Nominated | |
| 2009 | Outstanding Drama Series | Grey's Anatomy | Won | |
| 2009 | Outstanding Writing in a Dramatic Series | Grey's Anatomy (for "Freedom") | Won | |
| 2010 | Outstanding Drama Series | Grey's Anatomy | Nominated | |
| 2011 | Outstanding Drama Series | Grey's Anatomy | Won | |
| 2011 | Outstanding Writing in a Dramatic Series | Private Practice (for "Did You Hear What Happened to Charlotte King?") | Won | |
| 2013 | Outstanding Writing in a Dramatic Series | Grey's Anatomy (for "Flight") | Nominated | |
| 2013 | Outstanding Writing in a Dramatic Series | Scandal (for "Sweet Baby") | Nominated | |
| 2015 | Entertainer of the Year | Shonda Rhimes | Nominated | |
| 2016 | Entertainer of the Year | Shonda Rhimes | Nominated | |
| 2024 | Outstanding Drama Series | Queen Charlotte: A Bridgerton Story | Won | |

=== Peabody Awards ===
| Year | Work | Category | Result | Ref. |
|---|---|---|---|---|
| 2020 | Shondaland | Peabody Award | Honoree | |

=== Producers Guild of America Awards ===
| Year | Category | Work | Result | Ref. |
|---|---|---|---|---|
| 2005 | Television Series - Drama | Grey's Anatomy | Nominated | |
| 2006 | Television Series - Drama | Grey's Anatomy | Won | |
| 2007 | Television Series - Drama | Grey's Anatomy | Nominated | |
| 2017 | Norman Lear Achievement Award | Herself | Won | |
| 2021 | Television Series - Drama | Bridgerton | Nominated | |

=== Writers Guild of America Award ===
| Year | Category | Work | Result | Ref. |
|---|---|---|---|---|
| 2005 | New Series | Grey's Anatomy | Won | |
| 2005 | Dramatic Series | Grey's Anatomy | Nominated | |
| 2006 | Dramatic Series | Grey's Anatomy | Nominated | |
| 2015 | Laurel Award for TV Writing Achievement | Herself | Won | |
| 2023 | Episodic Drama | Queen Charlotte: A Bridgerton Story (for "Crown Jewels") | Nominated | |

=== Honorary British awards ===
| Year | Award | Recipient | Result | Ref. |
|---|---|---|---|---|
| 2024 | Honorary Commander of the British Empire (CBE) | Herself | Honoree | |
