= List of Netflix original films (2024) =

Netflix is an American global on-demand Internet streaming media provider, that has distributed a number of original programs, including original series, specials, miniseries, documentaries and films. Netflix's original films also include content that was first screened on cinematic release in other countries or given exclusive broadcast in other territories, and is then described as Netflix original content.

== Feature films ==
Title	Release date	Genre	Runtime	Language
Society of the Snow	January 4, 2024	Disaster drama	2 h 25 min	Spanish
Good Grief	January 5, 2024	Romantic comedy	1 h 40 min	English
Lift	January 12, 2024	Action comedy-thriller	1 h 46 min	English
From the Ashes	January 18, 2024	Drama	1 h 32 min	Arabic
Sixty Minutes	January 19, 2024	Action	1 h 29 min	German
The Kitchen	January 19, 2024	Science fiction drama	1 h 47 min	English
Badland Hunters	January 26, 2024	Dystopian action	1 h 47 min	Korean
Orion and the Dark	February 2, 2024	CGI animated fantasy adventure	1 h 32 min	English
Ashes	February 9, 2024	Drama	1 h 40 min	Turkish
Bhakshak	February 9, 2024	Crime drama	2 h 14 min	Hindi
Kill Me If You Dare	February 13, 2024	Comedy	1 h 34 min	Polish
Players	February 14, 2024	Romantic comedy	1 h 45 min	English
A Soweto Love Story	February 14, 2024	Romantic comedy	1 h 42 min	English
The Heartbreak Agency	February 14, 2024	Romantic comedy	1 h 36 min	German
Mea Culpa	February 23, 2024	Legal drama	2 h	English
Through My Window 3: Looking at You	February 23, 2024	Romance	1 h 45 min	Spanish
Code 8: Part II	February 28, 2024	Science fiction	1 h 40 min	English
The Parades	February 29, 2024	Drama	2 h 12 min	Japanese
My Name Is Loh Kiwan	March 1, 2024	Drama	2 h 13 min	Korean
Spaceman	March 1, 2024	Science fiction drama	1 h 47 min	English
Damsel	March 8, 2024	Fantasy action	1 h 50 min	English
24 Hours with Gaspar	March 14, 2024	Crime drama	1 h 38 min	Indonesian
Art of Love	March 14, 2024	Romance	1 h 39 min	Turkish
Irish Wish	March 15, 2024	Romantic comedy	1 h 33 min	English
Murder Mubarak	March 15, 2024	Dramedy	2 h 21 min	Hindi
The Wonderful Story of Henry Sugar and Three More	March 15, 2024	Fantasy anthology	1 h 28 min	English
Shirley	March 22, 2024	Biographical drama	1 h 58 min	English
The Casagrandes Movie	March 22, 2024	Animated comedy	1 h 25 min	English
Rest in Peace	March 27, 2024	Drama	1 h 47 min	Spanish
No Pressure	March 27, 2024	Romantic comedy	1 h 52 min	Polish
Heart of the Hunter	March 29, 2024	Spy thriller	1 h 47 min	English
The Beautiful Game	March 29, 2024	Drama	2 h 5 min	English
The Wages of Fear	March 29, 2024	Thriller	1 h 46 min	French
The Tearsmith	April 4, 2024	Coming-of-age romantic drama	1 h 45 min	Italian
Scoop	April 5, 2024	Biographical drama	1 h 42 min	English
A Journey	April 12, 2024	Drama	1 h 55 min	Filipino
Amar Singh Chamkila	April 12, 2024	Romantic musical	2 h 25 min	Hindi
Love, Divided	April 12, 2024	Romantic comedy	1 h 38 min	Spanish
Stolen	April 12, 2024	Drama	1 h 47 min	Northern Sami
Woody Woodpecker Goes to Camp	April 12, 2024	Slapstick comedy	1 h 40 min	English
Rebel Moon – Part Two: The Scargiver	April 19, 2024	Space opera	2 h 3 min	English
City Hunter	April 25, 2024	Action comedy	1 h 44 min	Japanese
Honeymoonish	April 29, 2024	Romantic comedy	1 h 40 min	Arabic
Down the Rabbit Hole	May 1, 2024	Deadpan comedy	1 h 42 min	Spanish
Beautiful Rebel	May 2, 2024	Biographical drama	1 h 53 min	Italian
Unfrosted	May 3, 2024	Comedy	1 h 36 min	English
Mother of the Bride	May 9, 2024	Romantic comedy	1 h 30 min	English
Monster	May 16, 2024	Thriller	1 h 24 min	No dialogue
Thelma the Unicorn	May 17, 2024	CGI animated musical	1 h 38 min	English
In Good Hands 2	May 23, 2024	Romantic comedy	1 h 39 min	Turkish
Atlas	May 24, 2024	Science fiction thriller	2 h	English
My Oni Girl	May 24, 2024	Anime fantasy	1 h 52 min	Japanese
Bionic	May 29, 2024	Science fiction	1 h 50 min	Portuguese
Colors of Evil: Red	May 29, 2024	Crime thriller	1 h 52 min	Polish
A Part of You	May 31, 2024	Coming-of-age drama	1 h 40 min	Swedish
The Price of Nonna's Inheritance	June 4, 2024	Comedy	1 h 30 min	Italian
Under Paris	June 5, 2024	Thriller	1 h 43 min	French
Basma	June 6, 2024	Drama	1 h 45 min	Arabic
Ultraman: Rising	June 14, 2024	CGI animated superhero	2 h 1 min	English
Inheritance	June 19, 2024	Comedy	1 h 34 min	Polish
Maharaj	June 21, 2024	Period drama	2 h 11 min	Hindi
Trigger Warning	June 21, 2024	Action thriller	1 h 46 min	English
Drawing Closer	June 27, 2024	Romance	1 h 58 min	Japanese
A Family Affair	June 28, 2024	Romantic comedy	1 h 53 min	English
Beverly Hills Cop: Axel F	July 3, 2024	Buddy cop	1 h 57 min	English
Goyo	July 5, 2024	Romantic drama	1 h 47 min	Spanish
Wild Wild Punjab	July 10, 2024	Comedy	1 h 50 min	Hindi
Vanished into the Night	July 11, 2024	Thriller	1 h 32 min	Italian
Blame the Game	July 12, 2024	Comedy	1 h 32 min	German
Lobola Man	July 12, 2024	Comedy	1 h 48 min	Zulu
The Champion	July 12, 2024	Comedy	1 h 46 min	Spanish
Find Me Falling	July 19, 2024	Romantic comedy	1 h 33 min	English
House of Ga'a	July 26, 2024	Drama	2 h	Yoruba
Non Negotiable	July 26, 2024	Action comedy	1 h 26 min	Spanish
Borderless Fog	August 1, 2024	Crime thriller	1 h 51 min	Indonesian
Saving Bikini Bottom: The Sandy Cheeks Movie	August 2, 2024	CGI animated comedy	1 h 26 min	English
Lolo and the Kid	August 7, 2024	Drama	1 h 37 min	Filipino
Mission: Cross	August 9, 2024	Crime comedy spy film	1 h 40 min	Korean
Phir Aayi Hasseen Dillruba	August 9, 2024	Crime thriller	2 h 12 min	Hindi
The Union	August 16, 2024	Spy	1 h 49 min	English
Nice Girls	August 21, 2024	Action comedy	1 h 32 min	French
Incoming	August 23, 2024	Comedy	1 h 31 min	English
Tòkunbò	August 23, 2024	Crime thriller	1 h 52 min	English
Untamed Royals	August 28, 2024	Drama	1 h 39 min	Spanish
The Deliverance	August 30, 2024	Thriller	1 h 52 min	English
(Un)lucky Sisters	August 30, 2024	Comedy	1 h 23 min	Spanish
Rebel Ridge	September 6, 2024	Thriller	2 h 11 min	English
Boxer	September 11, 2024	Sports drama	2 h 32 min	Polish
Technoboys	September 11, 2024	Musical drama	1 h 50 min	Spanish
Officer Black Belt	September 13, 2024	Action comedy	1 h 49 min	Korean
Sector 36	September 13, 2024	Crime thriller	2 h 3 min	Hindi
Uglies	September 13, 2024	Fantasy	1 h 42 min	English
His Three Daughters	September 20, 2024	Drama	1 h 44 min	English
Divorce	September 25, 2024	Drama	1 h 32 min	Polish
A True Gentleman	September 26, 2024	Drama	1 h 50 min	Turkish
Rez Ball	September 27, 2024	Sports drama	1 h 53 min	English
Trouble	October 3, 2024	Action comedy	1 h 38 min	Swedish
CTRL	October 4, 2024	Thriller	1 h 39 min	Hindi
It's What's Inside	October 4, 2024	Horror thriller	1 h 44 min	English
The Platform 2	October 4, 2024	Science fiction	1 h 40 min	Spanish
In Her Place	October 11, 2024	Drama	1 h 35 min	Spanish
Lonely Planet	October 11, 2024	Romantic drama	1 h 36 min	English
Uprising	October 11, 2024	Historical thriller	2 h 8 min	Korean
Justice	October 16, 2024	Crime drama	1 h 55 min	Polish
Outside	October 17, 2024	Post-apocalyptic psychological thriller	2 h 22 min	Filipino
The Shadow Strays	October 17, 2024	Action	2 h 25 min	Indonesian
Happiness Is	October 18, 2024	Comedy drama	1 h 36 min	English
The Man Who Loved UFOs	October 18, 2024	Comedy drama	1 h 47 min	Spanish
Family Pack	October 23, 2024	Comedy	1 h 35 min	French
Do Patti	October 25, 2024	Mystery thriller	2 h 7 min	Hindi
Don't Move	October 25, 2024	Thriller horror	1 h 32 min	English
Time Cut	October 30, 2024	Science fiction slasher	1 h 31 min	English
Let Go	November 1, 2024	Drama	1 h 50 min	Swedish
Meet Me Next Christmas	November 6, 2024	Romantic comedy	1 h 45 min	English
Pedro Páramo	November 6, 2024	Drama	2 h 12 min	Spanish
10 Days of a Curious Man	November 7, 2024	Drama	1 h 50 min	Turkish
Umjolo: The Gone Girl	November 8, 2024	Romantic comedy	1 h 33 min	Zulu
Vijay 69	November 8, 2024	Comedy drama	1 h 52 min	Hindi
Hot Frosty	November 13, 2024	Romantic comedy	1 h 32 min	English
GTMAX	November 20, 2024	Action	1 h 40 min	French
The Merry Gentlemen	November 20, 2024	Romantic comedy	1 h 27 min	English
Maybe Baby 2	November 21, 2024	Comedy	1 h 47 min	Danish
Joy	November 22, 2024	Drama	1 h 55 min	English
Spellbound	November 22, 2024	CGI animated musical fantasy	1 h 50 min	English
The Piano Lesson	November 22, 2024	Drama	2 h 7 min	English
Our Little Secret	November 27, 2024	Romantic comedy	1 h 41 min	English
Sikandar Ka Muqaddar	November 29, 2024	Crime drama	2 h 23 min	Hindi
The Snow Sister	November 29, 2024	Holiday	1 h 37 min	Norwegian
That Christmas	December 4, 2024	CGI-animated Christmas fantasy comedy-drama	1 h 37 min	English
The Children's Train	December 4, 2024	Period drama	1 h 46 min	Italian
Camp Crasher	December 6, 2024	Comedy	1 h 35 min	Spanish
Mary	December 6, 2024	Period drama	1 h 52 min	English
Carry-On	December 13, 2024	Action thriller	1 h 59 min	English
Disaster Holiday	December 13, 2024	Comedy	1 h 33 min	English
Ferry 2	December 20, 2024	Crime drama	1 h 35 min	Dutch
The Six Triple Eight	December 20, 2024	Period drama	2 h 9 min	English
Umjolo: Day Ones	December 20, 2024	Romantic comedy	1 h 26 min	Zulu

== Documentaries ==
Title	Release date	Runtime	Language
Bitconned	January 1, 2024	1 h 34 min	English
The Greatest Night in Pop	January 29, 2024	1 h 37 min	English
Lover, Stalker, Killer	February 9, 2024	1 h 30 min	English
Einstein and the Bomb	February 16, 2024	1 h 16 min	English
You Are Not Alone: Fighting the Wolf Pack	March 1, 2024	1 h 42 min	Spanish
To Kill a Tiger	March 10, 2024	2 h 7 min	Hindi
The Antisocial Network: Memes to Mayhem	April 5, 2024	1 h 25 min	English
What Jennifer Did	April 10, 2024	1 h 27 min	English
The Doomsday Cult of Antares de la Luz	April 25, 2024	1 h 40 min	Spanish
Hack Your Health: The Secrets of Your Gut	April 26, 2024	1 h 19 min	English
Secrets of the Neanderthals	May 2, 2024	1 h 20 min	English
The Final: Attack on Wembley	May 8, 2024	1 h 22 min	English
The Guardian of the Monarchs	May 9, 2024	1 h 31 min	Spanish
Living with Leopards	May 10, 2024	1 h 11 min	English
Power	May 17, 2024	1 h 28 min	English
Illusions for Sale: The Rise and Fall of Generation Zoe	May 23, 2024	1 h 47 min	Spanish
How to Rob a Bank	June 5, 2024	1 h 28 min	English
Nelma Kodama: The Queen of Dirty Money	June 6, 2024	1 h 34 min	Portuguese
Rafa Márquez: El Capitán	June 6, 2024	1 h 22 min	Spanish
Mysteries of the Terracotta Warriors	June 12, 2024	1 h 17 min	English
Outstanding: A Comedy Revolution	June 18, 2024	1 h 39 min	English
Black Barbie: A Documentary	June 19, 2024	1 h 53 min	English
The Accidental Twins	June 20, 2024	1 h 24 min	Spanish
Skywalkers: A Love Story	July 19, 2024	1 h 40 min	English
Mountain Queen: The Summits of Lhakpa Sherpa	July 31, 2024	1 h 44 min	English
Mon Laferte, te amo	August 1, 2024	1 h 18 min	Spanish
Modern Masters: S. S. Rajamouli	August 2, 2024	1 h 14 min	English
Inside the Mind of a Dog	August 9, 2024	1 h 15 min	English
Daughters	August 14, 2024	1 h 48 min	English
Untold: The Murder of Air McNair	August 20, 2024	58 min	English
Secret Lives of Orangutans	August 22, 2024	1 h 19 min	English
Untold: Sign Stealer	August 27, 2024	1 h 27 min	English
Untold: Hope Solo vs. U.S. Soccer	September 3, 2024	1 h 14 min	English
Apollo 13: Survival	September 5, 2024	1 h 38 min	English
Jailbreak: Love on the Run	September 25, 2024	1 h 28 min	English
An Invisible Victim: The Eliza Samudio Case	September 26, 2024	1 h 41 min	Portuguese
Will & Harper	September 27, 2024	1 h 54 min	English
The Menendez Brothers	October 7, 2024	1 h 58 min	English
Breaking the Silence: The Maria Soledad Case	October 10, 2024	1 h 35 min	Spanish
Sweet Bobby: My Catfish Nightmare	October 16, 2024	1 h 22 min	English
The Turnaround	October 18, 2024	25 min	English
The Remarkable Life of Ibelin	October 25, 2024	1 h 43 min	English
Martha	October 30, 2024	1 h 53 min	English
It's All Over: The Kiss That Changed Spanish Football	November 1, 2024	1 h 35 min	Spanish
Return of the King: The Fall and Rise of Elvis Presley	November 13, 2024	1 h 31 min	English
The Lost Children	November 14, 2024	1 h 36 min	Spanish
Nayanthara: Beyond the Fairytale	November 17, 2024	1 h 22 min	English
Buy Now: The Shopping Conspiracy	November 20, 2024	1 h 24 min	English
The Only Girl in the Orchestra	December 4, 2024	35 min	English
Biggest Heist Ever	December 6, 2024	1 h 27 min	English
Makayla's Voice: A Letter to the World	December 11, 2024	24 min	English
Julia's Stepping Stone	December 18, 2024	32 min	English
Yo Yo Honey Singh: Famous	December 20, 2024	1 h 20 min	Hindi
Avicii – I'm Tim	December 31, 2024	1 h 36 min	English

== Specials ==
These programs are one-time original events or supplementary content related to original films.

Title	Release date	Genre	Runtime	Language
Society of the Snow: Who Were We on the Mountain?	January 24, 2024	Behind the scenes	36 min	Spanish
Sit Down with Stand Up Udom Taephanich	January 26, 2024	Talk show	2 h 4 min	Thai
The 30th Annual Screen Actors Guild Awards	February 24, 2024	Award show	3 h 15 min	English
The Netflix Slam	March 3, 2024	Sports event	2 h 41 min	English
Creating a Universe – The Making of Rebel Moon	April 19, 2024	Behind the scenes	28 min	English
Rebel Moon – Chapter One: Chalice of Blood	August 2, 2024	Director's cut	3 h 24 min	English
Rebel Moon – Chapter Two: Curse of Forgiveness	August 2, 2024	Director's cut	2 h 53 min	English
Chestnut vs. Kobayashi: Unfinished Beef	September 2, 2024	Competitive eating	1 h 12 min	English
Olivia Rodrigo: GUTS World Tour	October 29, 2024	Concert	1 h 44 min	English
Jake Paul vs. Mike Tyson	November 15, 2024	Sports event	5 h 6 min	English
A Nonsense Christmas with Sabrina Carpenter	December 6, 2024	Music/Variety	50 min	English
Family Pack: Fireplace	December 13, 2024	Yule log	1 h	No dialogue
Mid-Century Modern Fireplace	December 13, 2024	Yule log	1 h	No dialogue
Rustic Cabin Fireplace	December 13, 2024	Yule log	1 h	No dialogue
Spellbound: Fireplace	December 13, 2024	Yule log	1 h	No dialogue
White Christmas Fireplace	December 13, 2024	Yule log	1 h	No dialogue
Christmas Gameday: Chiefs vs. Steelers	December 25, 2024	Sports event	5 h 26 min	English
Christmas Gameday: Ravens vs. Texans	December 25, 2024	Sports event	3 h 56 min	English
Avicii – My Last Show	December 31, 2024	DJ mixset	29 min	English

== Shorts ==
These are programs that have a runtime of less than 20 minutes.

Title	Genre	Release date	Runtime	Language
Sing: Thriller	CGI animated jukebox musical comedy	October 16, 2024	11 min	English
