= Amitis Motevalli =

Iranian-American artist (born 1970)

- Born: Tehran, Iran
- Education: San Francisco State University; Claremont Graduate University
- Known for: Public art, performance, pedagogy, photography, video, painting
- Website: amitismotevalli.com

Amitis Motevalli (born 1970) is a multidisciplinary Iranian-American artist known for her work exploring identity, queer and feminist theory and culturally resistant pedagogy. Motevalli’s work intersects art, pedagogy, and community organizing, cultivating a sense of belonging and solidarity among people living in and facing situations of violence, prejudice, and marginalization. Her body of work spans across various media including public installations, performance, sculpture, photography, video and painting.

== Early life and education ==
Amitis Motevalli was born in Tehran, Iran and moved to the United States in 1977. At the age of 17, Motevalli began experimenting with performance in the Los Angeles sub-cultural scene assisting an experienced performance artist who befriended her, Vaginal Davis. She attended San Francisco State University and received a BA in Art with a minor in Women's Studies in 1995, and received her MFA from the Claremont Graduate University Center in 1997.

== Career ==
Amitis Motevalli began teaching in 1998 as the first arts teacher in 12 years at Locke High School in South Los Angeles. Locke High School was one of the most severely under-resourced schools in the Los Angeles Unified School District. Motevalli supported the work of students, their parents, and surrounding community to organize the Locke Student Union to counter restrictive policies on the school campus including invasive searches and brutality towards the students. This began as discussions with students in art classes and evolved into grassroots organizing around access to basic educational materials and against police presence in schools to ensure civil rights, privacy, and pedagogy without profiling. The collective movement work resulted in mass civil rights suits against the school district through the ACLU and other civil rights lawyers. In 2002, when pushed out of public schools, Motevalli, alongside her colleagues, collectively founded the city’s first social justice school called the Los Angeles Leadership Academy.

Motevalli currently serves as the director of the William Grant Still Arts Center in Los Angeles. The William Grant Still Arts Center is a publicly-funded community arts center in South Central Los Angeles operated by the City of Los Angeles Department of Cultural Affairs with deep roots in the 1970s Black Arts Movement. As director since 2010, Motevalli has initiated classes, workshops, arts programming, and exhibitions exploring intersections of local history and grassroots archives as a counternarrative to canons of art, culture, and history in LA. In 2014, Motevalli spearheaded a city wide initiative called LA/Islam Arts Initiative, which brought together multiple organizations and cultural institutions, as well as a number of artists and curators across Los Angeles and Southern California to tell various stories of traditional and contemporary art from multiple Islamic regions and their global diasporas.

Motevalli has been the recipient of numerous national and international residencies and awards. In 2008, she held residencies at the Montalvo Arts Center as a Lucas Art Fellow and an 18th Street/Andy Warhol Artist Fellow. Motevalli held a residency as the Danish International Visiting Artist in 2012, sponsored by the Danish Ministry of Culture in the Gellerup Housing Project in Aarhus, Denmark. Motevalli was later invited to participate in a similar residency in Hamtramck, Michigan in collaboration with the Museum of Contemporary Art Detroit (MOCAD) and the Arab American National Museum, and later served as a Visual Arts Panelists for the 2019 Kresge Artist Fellows.

Motevalli received a Visions for California Award as well as California Community Foundation Fellowship in 2007 and 2012. In 2020 she received a Creative Capital Award for her project "Golestan Revisited," a multicomponent project honoring and documenting individual women of all ages from Central, West Asia and North Africa who were killed in wars and militarized attacks and reemerging their stories through the symbolic and literal depiction of the rose. In 2024, Motevalli received a residency in Gender and Body Politics in Iranian Art at Brown University and Columbia University.

In 2023, Motevalli featured in the Netflix film Black Barbie: A Documentary written by Lagueria Davis.

== Performances ==
Motevalli’s performance work activates public space, blending identity, fashion, culture, and lived experience as vessels to explore subversion and revolution. Motevalli has created performative characters, Sand Ninja and AK-AMI, their existence realized from exaggerated aspects of her own identity and those of young women in diaspora from Central, West, and South Asia and North Africa. Since 2005, Sand Ninja, who employs western constructed imagery and stereotypes as her superpower, has been a reoccurring character in a number of public performances. In 2016, Amitis Motevalli engaged as Sand Ninja in the production, "Scenes Unseen" at the African American Art & Culture Complex in San Francisco, California.

Another reoccurring performance from Motevalli is Baba Karam Lessons, a performance series inspired by Adrian Piper's Funk Lessons. Baba Karam Lessons was first performed in a Santa Monica Gallery in 2011, and the installation for the audience-interactive performance included costume items and mirrors with directions of the dance written on them for the audience to follow along. In 2016, Motevalli presented Baba Karam Lessons at a bar in Cypress Park at Discostan, a Los Angeles-based project and record label, founded by Arshia Fatima Haq, that draws people from QTPOC and SWANA diasporic communities through art, sound, and performance. Motevalli's performance included a group of five artists of various cultures and gender-identities in full costume that she taught the dance to activate the nightclub by teaching people in dancing Baba Karam.

In 2021, Motevalli presented Borrowing Authority from Death in New York. Borrowing Authority from Death was a multicomponent, ritualistic performance dedicated to those deeply impacted by 9/11. The first part of the performance started indoors at the Leslie-Lohman Museum of Art. Alongside musician Daro Behroozi, multi-instrumentalist, educator, and composer who played the daf, Motevalli performed a Dhikr. Prior to the performance, Motevalli had asked various people to energetically send their pain in connection with that day of remembrance. Together with spiritual sadist and pain practitioner Dia Dynasty, Motevalli then performed a channeling ritual to transfer the pain to herself. Following this, Motevalli sat for needle piercings on her back in the shape of the World Trade Center’s twin towers.

The second part of the performance traveled through sites of burial and loss from the 9/11 attacks, such as Broadway, Liberty Park, Washington Boulevard, Little, Syria and Battery Park. Motevalli designed and wore a wearable sculptural altar inspired by both the hoopoe from Farid al-Din Attar's The Conference of the Birds and the alam carried in street marches from Shia and Sufi rituals. In this performance, her body became a symbol of both offering and pain as she walked through the site-based pathway.

== Exhibitions ==
In 2010, Motevalli had a solo exhibition titled, Here/There, Then/Now at Aaran Gallery in Tehran, Iran. This show featured her work “Fannie Lou Hamer Speech.” This was a live performance in which Motevalli hand wrote in gold ink on the exterior walls of the gallery the first ever translated text in Persian of Fannie Lou Hamer’s 1964 speech at the Democratic National Convention. In this speech, Hamer she describes being arrested and beaten for voting. Motevalli’s hand-written translation drew parallels between the Civil Rights Movement and social justice movements in the US to contemporary political struggles in Iran and the Iranian diaspora

In April of 2025, Motevalli's works "A Portrait of the Artist as a Young Rebel + Joke's on Me / Stupid Muslim Joke" were installed at East Window Gallery in Boulder, Colorado. Her work "Portrait of the Artist as a Young Rebel" is a photographic series of images from her childhood, blending photographs from her past and personal history with drawings made with markers of present-day racial and cultural stereotypes of Islamic and Iranian identity. For the installation at East Window Gallery, "Joke's on Me/Stupid Muslim Joke" is an interactive public performance that Motevalli has performed in multiple countries.
