= Shonda Rhimes =

American television producer and screenwriter (born 1970)

Shonda Rhimes CBE
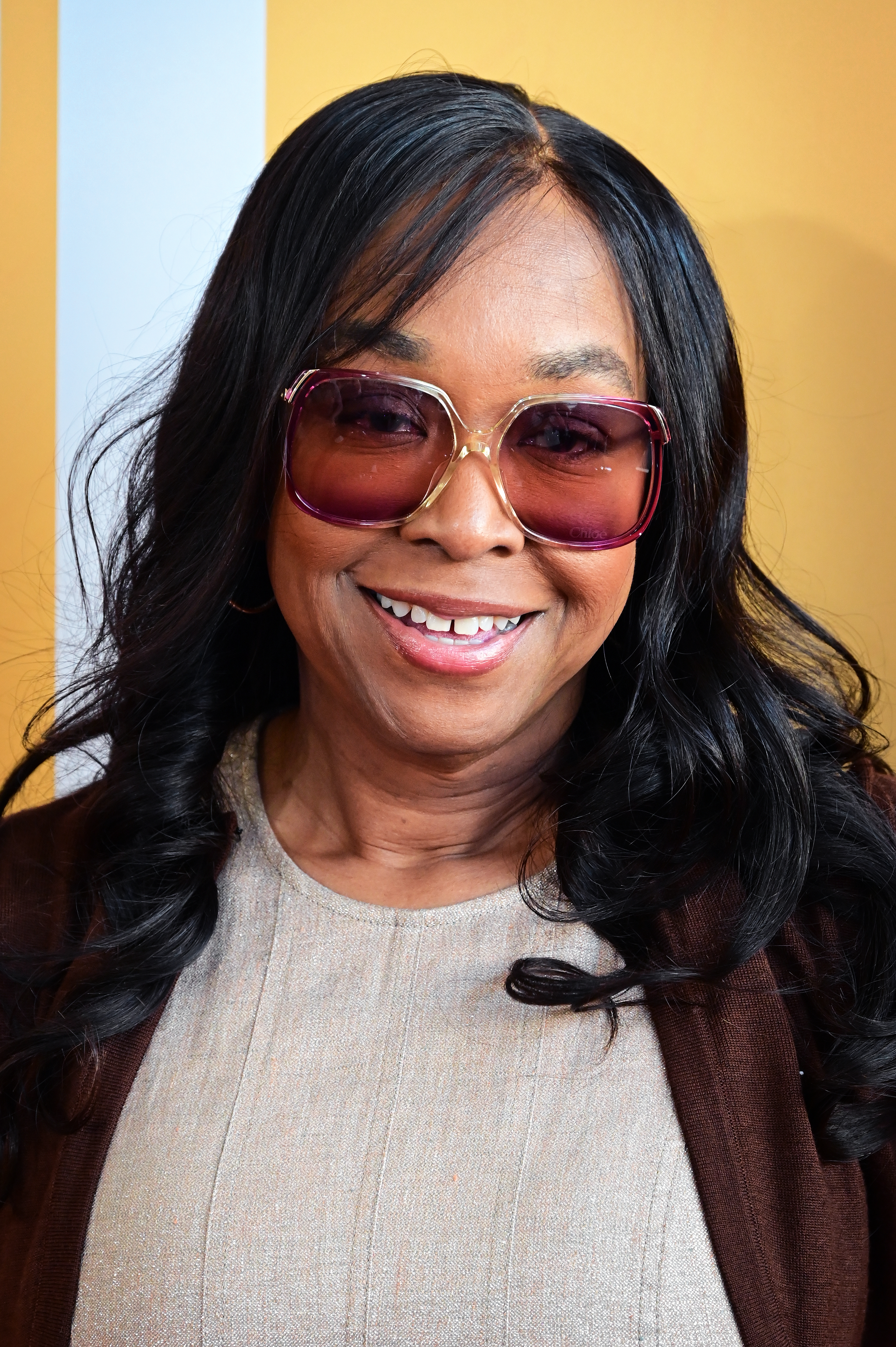
- Rhimes in 2026
- Born: Shonda Lynn Rhimes; January 13, 1970 (age 56); Chicago, Illinois, U.S.
- Education: Dartmouth College (BA); University of Southern California (MFA)
- Occupations: Television producer; screenwriter
- Years active: 1995–present
- Children: 3

Shonda Lynn Rhimes (born January 13, 1970) is an American television producer and screenwriter, and founder of the production company Shondaland. Rhimes became known as the first showrunner—creator, head writer and executive producer—of the medical drama Grey's Anatomy (2005–present), its spin-off Private Practice (2007–2013) and the political thriller Scandal (2012–2018), becoming the first African American woman to create and serve as showrunner for three television dramas that all reached the 100-episode milestone.

Rhimes has served as the executive producer of the ABC thriller series How to Get Away with Murder (2014–2020), the Netflix period series Bridgerton (2020–present) and Queen Charlotte: A Bridgerton Story (2023) and crime drama Inventing Anna (2022). She has been nominated five times for a Primetime Emmy Award, won a Golden Globe Award and a Daytime Emmy Award, and received special honors at the British Academy Television Awards and International Emmy Awards.

In 2015, Rhimes was inducted into the NAB Broadcasting Hall of Fame. In 2017, she was inducted into the Television Hall of Fame and became a Chair's Appointee of the Academy of Television Arts & Sciences's executive committee. She is also part of the USC Film Council and the Writers Guild Inclusion Committee.

In 2007, 2013, and 2021, Rhimes was named by Time to the Time 100, their annual list of the 100 most influential people in the world. As of 2023, she is one of the richest women entertainers in America, with a net worth of $250 million. In 2015, she published her first book, a memoir, Year of Yes: How to Dance It Out, Stand in the Sun, and Be Your Own Person. In 2016, Rhimes formed The Rhimes Family Foundation whose mission is to support arts, education, and activism.

== Early life and education ==
Rhimes was born in Chicago, Illinois, the youngest of six children. Her mother, Vera P. (née Cain), was a college professor who earned a PhD in educational administration in 1991 while raising the family. Her father, Ilee Rhimes Jr., served as a university administrator and later became the chief information officer at the University of Southern California, a position he held until 2013.

Rhimes lived in Park Forest South (now University Park, Illinois), with her two older brothers and three older sisters. She has said she exhibited an early affinity for storytelling. While in high school, she served as a hospital volunteer, which inspired an interest in hospital environments.

Raised Catholic, Rhimes attended Marian Catholic High School in Chicago Heights, Illinois. At Dartmouth College, she majored in English and film studies and earned her bachelor's degree in 1991. At Dartmouth, she joined the Black Underground Theater Association. She divided her time between directing and performing in student productions, and writing fiction. She also wrote for the college newspaper.

After college, she relocated to San Francisco with an older sibling and worked in advertising at McCann Erickson. She subsequently moved to Los Angeles to attend the University of Southern California and study screenwriting. Ranked at the top of her USC class, Rhimes earned the Gary Rosenberg Writing Fellowship. She obtained a Master of Fine Arts degree from the USC School of Cinematic Arts.

While at USC, Rhimes was hired as an intern by Debra Martin Chase. Rhimes credits her early success, in part, to mentors such as Chase, a prominent African-American producer. Chase later again served as a mentor to Rhimes on The Princess Diaries 2. Rhimes also worked at Denzel Washington's company, Mundy Lane Entertainment.

== Career ==
=== Career beginnings: 1995–2004 ===
After graduation, Rhimes was an unemployed scriptwriter in Hollywood. To make ends meet, Rhimes worked at a variety of day jobs, including as an office administrator and then a counselor at a job center that taught job skills to people with housing instability and mental illness. During this period, Rhimes worked as research director on the documentary Hank Aaron: Chasing the Dream (1995), which won the 1995 Peabody Award. In 1998, Rhimes made a short film, Blossoms and Veils, starring Jada Pinkett-Smith and Jeffrey Wright, which is her only credit as a film director. New Line Cinema purchased a feature script of hers. Rhimes received an assignment to co-write the HBO movie Introducing Dorothy Dandridge (1999), which earned numerous awards for its star, Halle Berry.

In 2001, Rhimes wrote Crossroads, the debut film of pop singer Britney Spears. Despite being panned by critics, the film grossed more than $60 million worldwide.

Rhimes next worked on writing Disney's sequel to its popular movie The Princess Diaries (2001). Although The Princess Diaries 2: Royal Engagement (2004) did not score as well at the box office, Rhimes later said that she treasured the experience, if only for the opportunity to work with its star, Julie Andrews. In 2003, Rhimes wrote her first TV pilot for ABC about young female war correspondents, but the network turned it down.

=== Grey's Anatomy, Private Practice, Scandal and other projects with ABC ===
Rhimes is the creator and currently executive producer and head writer of Grey's Anatomy. The series debuted as a mid-season replacement on March 27, 2005. The series features the surgical staff at the fictional Seattle Grace Hospital (later to be named Grey Sloan Memorial Hospital), in Seattle, Washington. The series features an ensemble cast with Ellen Pompeo serving as titular character Meredith Grey, who provides narration for a majority of the series' episodes.

In 2007, Rhimes created and produced the Grey's Anatomy spin-off series Private Practice, which debuted September 26, 2007, on ABC. The show chronicles the life of Dr. Addison Montgomery (Kate Walsh) as she leaves Seattle Grace Hospital for Los Angeles to join a private practice. The series also features an ensemble cast, including Tim Daly, Amy Brenneman, Audra McDonald and Taye Diggs among others. The first season was shortened because of a writers' strike; it has nine episodes. In May 2012, ABC picked up Private Practice for the 2012–13 television season with 13 episodes. The series finale aired January 22, 2013.

In 2010, Rhimes created a new pilot for ABC called Inside the Box, a female-centric ensemble drama set in a Washington, D.C., network news bureau. The lead character is Catherine, an ambitious female news producer who, with her colleagues, pursues "the story" at all costs while juggling their personal animosities and crises of conscience. It was not picked up by the network.

In 2011, Rhimes served as executive producer for the medical drama, Off the Map, which was created by Grey's Anatomy writer, Jenna Bans. It focuses on a group of doctors who practice medicine at a remote clinic in the Amazon jungle. The series was officially cancelled by the ABC network on May 13, 2011.

In May 2011, ABC ordered Rhimes's pilot script Scandal to series. Kerry Washington starred as Olivia Pope, a political crisis management expert. The character is partially based on former Bush administration press aide Judy Smith. The series debut aired on April 5, 2012.

In 2012, Rhimes developed a pilot for a period drama, Gilded Lilys, but it was not picked up to series.

In December 2013, ABC ordered a pilot for a new Rhimes series, How to Get Away with Murder. Actress Viola Davis joined the cast as the lead character in February 2014. It was officially picked up to series on May 8, 2014.

In March 2016, ABC premiered The Catch, a comedy-drama led by Rhimes based on a treatment by British author Kate Atkinson. It stars Mireille Enos and Peter Krause. Later that month, Scandal, How to Get Away with Murder and Grey's Anatomy were respectively picked up for their sixth, third and 13th seasons. The following year, it was announced that Scandal would conclude after its upcoming seventh season, while The Catch was cancelled after its second.

ABC ordered an untitled Grey's Anatomy spin-off in May 2026, co-created by Rhimes and Meg Marinis, for the 2026–27 television season. Set at a rural medical center in West Texas, the series was initially expected to premiere in midseason 2027. After the production was denied California tax credits twice, filming was moved to Albuquerque, New Mexico, and the series' debut was pushed to the 2027–28 broadcast season.

=== Netflix deal ===
On August 14, 2017, Netflix announced that it had entered into an exclusive multi-year development deal with Rhimes, under which all of her future productions will be Netflix Original series. The service had already purchased American streaming rights to past episodes of Grey's Anatomy and Scandal. Chief Content Officer Ted Sarandos described Rhimes as being a "true Netflixer at heart" since "she loves TV and films, she cares passionately about her work, and she delivers for her audience". The deal was considered to be a coup for Netflix due to Rhimes's prominence at ABC; it was also considered to be a counter toward the effort by Disney, ABC's parent company, to reduce the availability of their content on Netflix in favor of a planned subscription streaming service of their own.

As of October 2020, she was working on more than 12 projects for Netflix. In July 2021, Rhimes extended her deal with Netflix. The first production was Bridgerton, which was released in 2020 and became the most-watched series ever on the platform, leading to the production of four seasons by 2026. In 2021, Rhimes produced the drama miniseries Inventing Anna. In April 2022, the production of Queen Charlotte: A Bridgerton Story conceived by Rhimes was announced, as a spin-off of Bridgerton.

Rhimes was an executive producer of The Residence, which premiered on Netflix on March 20, 2025. Netflix cancelled the series after one season in July 2025.

Rhimes won her first competitive Emmy Award on October 17, 2025, at the 52nd Daytime Creative Arts & Lifestyle Emmy Awards, where she took home the Daytime Emmy Award for Outstanding Arts and Popular Culture Program for Black Barbie: A Documentary (2023).

Rhimes renewed her overall deal with Netflix for five years in August 2026. The agreement covers the development of television series, films and games, as well as merchandise and live events connected to Shondaland projects.

== Personal life ==
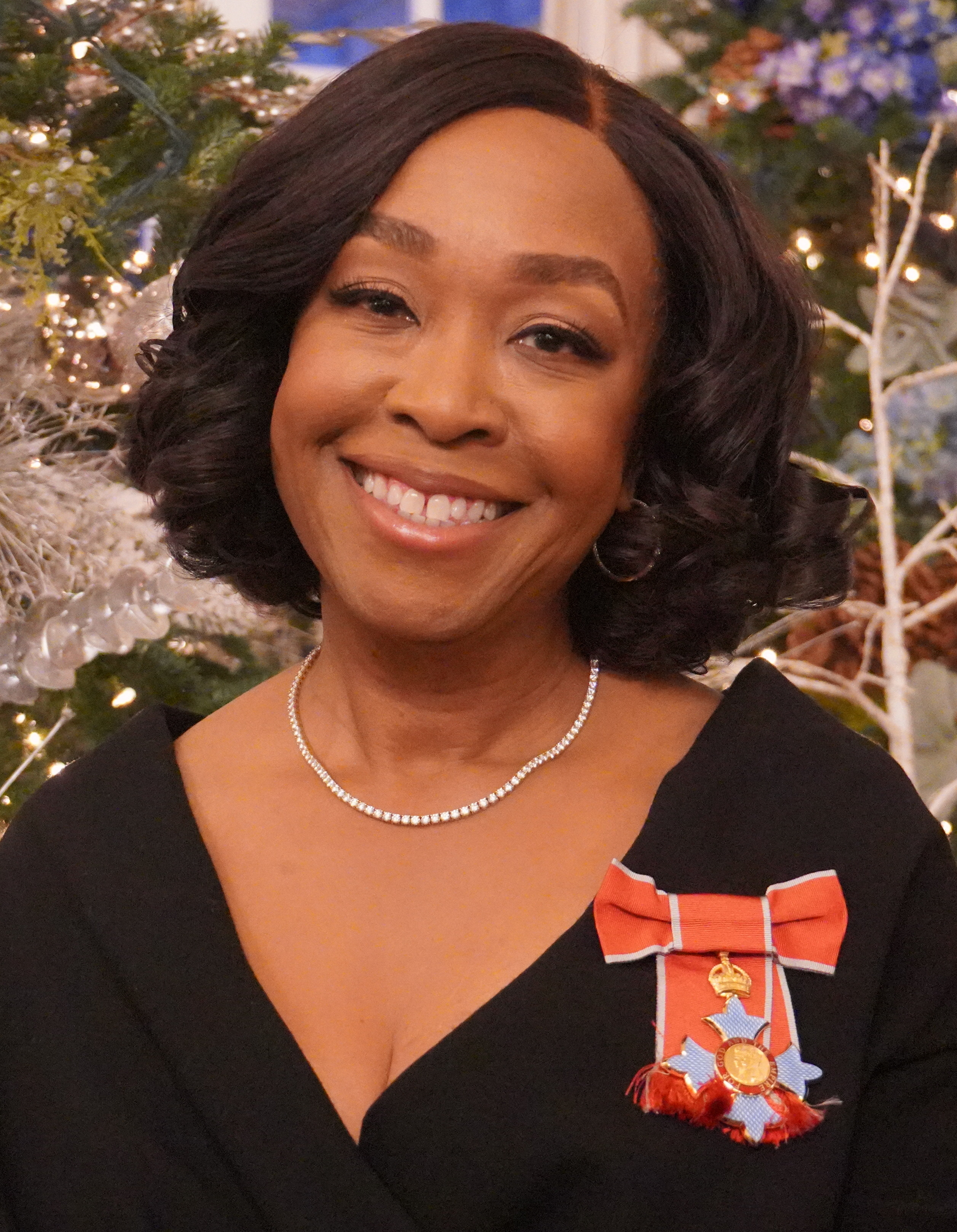
Rhimes was created a Commander of the Order of the British Empire (CBE) for services to UK/US Relations in 2024

Rhimes adopted her first daughter in June 2002 and adopted another daughter in February 2012. In September 2013, Rhimes welcomed her third daughter via gestational surrogacy.

In 2014, Rhimes gave a commencement address at her alma mater, Dartmouth College, where she received an honorary doctorate.

In September 2015, Rhimes revealed she had lost 117 pounds (53 kg) via exercise and dieting.

=== Activism ===
In April 2017, Rhimes joined the national board of Planned Parenthood. Later that same year, Rhimes and Katie McGrath co-founded Time's Up, and both of them donated the funds to hire its first seven employees.

In 2019, Rhimes joined the organization When We All Vote as a co-chair. This organization was founded to get out the vote prior to the 2020 general election.

== Shondaland ==
Shondaland is the name of Rhimes's production company. Shondaland and its logo also refer to the shows Rhimes has produced and to Rhimes herself. Television series and other productions associated with Shondaland include:

- Grey's Anatomy (2005–present)
- Private Practice (2007–2013)
- Off the Map (2011)
- Scandal (2012–2018)
- How to Get Away with Murder (2014–2020)
- The Catch (2016–2017)
- Still Star-Crossed (2017)
- For the People (2018–2019)
- Station 19 (2018–2024)
- Bridgerton (2020–present)
- Inventing Anna (2022)
- Queen Charlotte: A Bridgerton Story (2023)
- Black Barbie (2024)
- The Residence (2025)

== Filmography ==
Year	Title	Credited as			
Year	Title	Creator	Director	Writer	Producer
1995	Hank Aaron: Chasing the Dream	No	No (Note: Credited as Research Director.)	No	No
1998	Blossoms and Veils	No	Yes	Yes	No
1999	Introducing Dorothy Dandridge	No	No	Yes	No
2002	Crossroads	No	No	Yes	No
2004	The Princess Diaries 2: Royal Engagement	No	No	Yes	No
2005–present	Grey's Anatomy	Yes	No	Yes	Yes
2007–2013	Private Practice	Yes	No	Yes	Yes
2009	Inside the Box	No	No	No	Yes
2009	Seattle Grace: On Call	Yes	No	No	Yes
2009	Seattle Grace: Message of Hope	Yes	No	No	Yes
2011	Off the Map	No	No	No	Yes
2012	Gilded Lilys	No	No	No	Yes
2012–2018	Scandal	Yes	No	Yes	Yes
2014–2020	How to Get Away with Murder	No	No	No	Yes
2016–2017	The Catch	No	No	No	Yes
2017	Still Star-Crossed	No	No	No	Yes
2018–2019	For the People	No	No	No	Yes
2018–2024	Station 19	No	No	No	Yes
2020–present	Bridgerton	No	No	No	Yes
2022	Inventing Anna	Yes	No	Yes	Yes
2023	Queen Charlotte: A Bridgerton Story	Yes	No	Yes	Yes
2024	Black Barbie: A Documentary	No	No	No	Yes
2025	The Residence	No	No	No	Yes

== Bibliography ==
- Year of Yes: How to Dance It Out, Stand In the Sun and Be Your Own Person, November 2015. New York: Simon & Schuster. ISBN 978-1476777092. OCLC 1026348497.

=== Essays and reporting ===
- "Scoop Dreams". Work for Hire. The New Yorker. Vol. 92, no. 32. October 10, 2016. p. 64.

== Awards and nominations ==
Winner of the Golden Globe Award for Best Television Series – Drama in 2006 for Grey's Anatomy, Rhimes won the International Emmy Founders Award and the Special Award at the British Academy Television Awards. She also received special honorees for her works at the Costume Designers Guild Awards, Directors Guild of America Award, ICG Publicists Awards, Writers Guild of America Award and Producers Guild of America Awards.

In 2024, Rhimes was appointed an Honorary Commander of the British Empire for services to UK–US relations.
