= Yair Cohen =

British lawyer

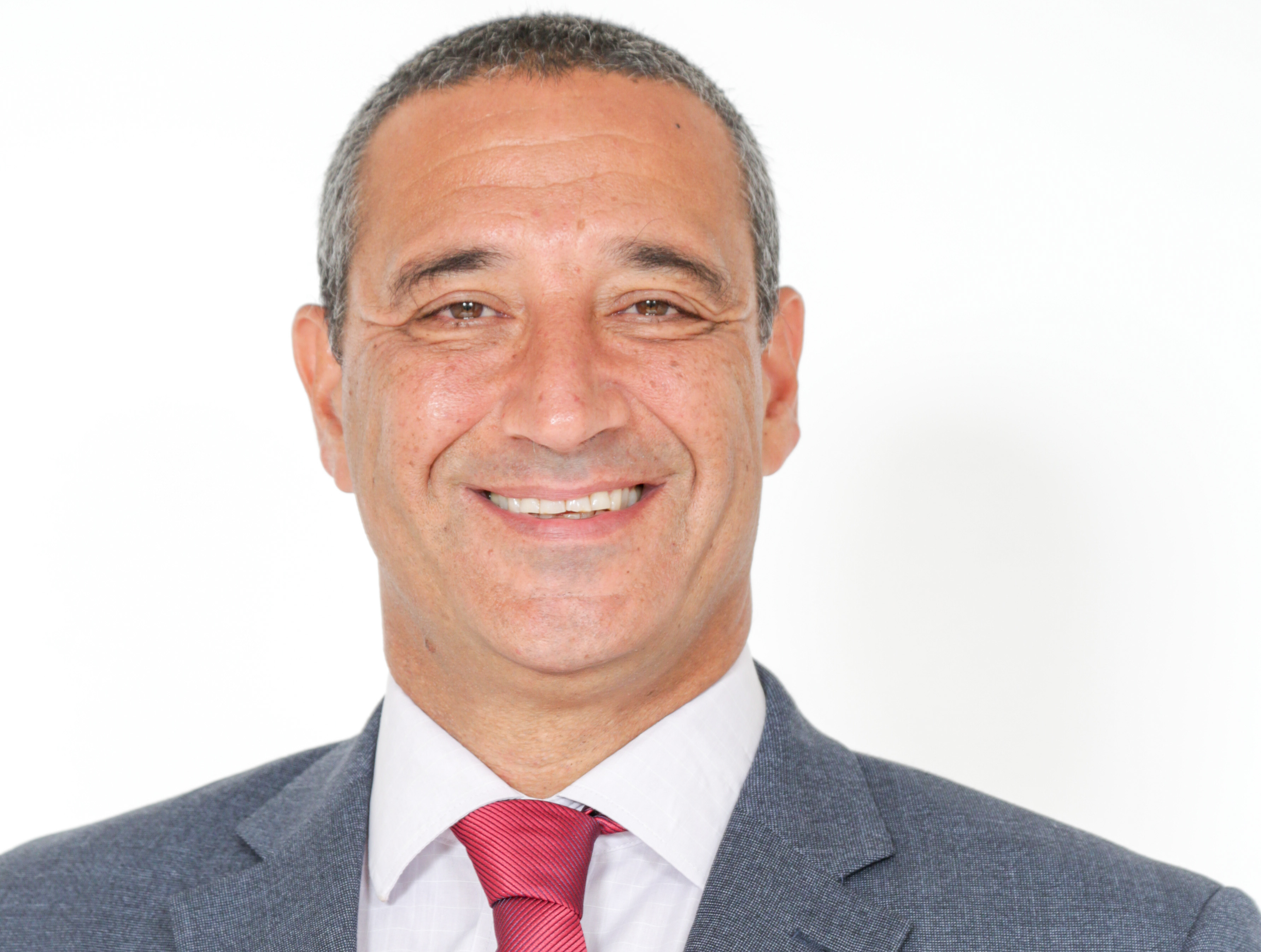
- Yair Cohen
- Born: 1968 (age 57–58)
- Occupation: Solicitor

Yair Cohen is an English solicitor specialising in internet law, defamation, privacy, online harassment, and reputation management.

Cohen was admitted as a solicitor in England and Wales in 1997. He founded Cohen Davis Solicitors (which trades as The Internet Law Centre) a UK law firm focusing on complex defamation and internet harassment cases, including those involving social media abuse, disclosure orders, and privacy injunctions. His work has been reported in national and international media, and The Telegraph described him as a "troll-hunting lawyer".

== Early career and Internet Law cases ==
Cohen graduated from City University in London in 1998. He went on to become one of the first lawyers in the UK to specialise in Internet Law and in 2011 he obtained the first ever reported anti-trolls disclosure order from the UK website MoneySavingExperts, in relation to internet trolls who targeted one of his clients. A year later, Cohen acted for Nicola Brookes in proceedings that resulted in the first UK court order requiring Facebook to disclose the identities of anonymous internet trolls.

In 2015 Cohen became the first UK lawyer to be given court permission to serve a court injunction on an anonymous internet troll via the social media platform WhatsApp. The case involved a London student suffering abuse on Instagram by an anonymous person posting racial and sexual abuse, and threatening to disclose private information.

In 2017, Cohen acted for a transgender escort, in the case of GYH v Persons Unknown [2017] EWHC 3360 (QB). The case concerned an injunction application to prevent the publication, on Escorts advertising websites, that his client had HIV/Aids and that she was transgender. The court held that she was not required to disclose her transgender status in any publication, emphasising that all individuals, regardless of occupation or identity, are entitled to privacy protection. The court further held that the "public interest" defence to harassment and/or breach of privacy, would not be applicable where the publication concerns false, or unproven allegations that someone had HIV/Aids.

In 2018, Cohen obtained damages and an injunction against businessman Paul Curran and his company Curran Consulting Ltd after he managed to prove that Curran was the individual who had been trolling and harassing his client, Lindsey Goldrick-Dean for over 12 years following a brief dating period between the two over a decade earlier. At the time, this was believed to be the longest ever harassment campaign against a woman in the UK.

In 2020, in one of first online dating blackmail cases in the UK, Cohen acted for a claimant, an American businessman who met a female escort through the website Seeking Arrangements, the purpose of which is to connect clients interested in a sugar dating relationship. The case involved attempts to extort money through threats of publishing private material against the businessman by the female escort. The injunction was granted on common law grounds of misuse of private information and the Protection from Harassment Act 1997.

Some media coverage has criticised Cohen’s law firm, Cohen Davis Solicitors, for taking a hard line in disputes about online reviews. In 2017, The Independent reported that the firm wrote to a TripAdvisor user on behalf of a venue, alleging that a one star review was defamatory and requesting further information and its removal, and referred to possible court action.

== Career ==
=== Sweet Bobby ===
Between 2021 and 2024, Cohen represented Kirat Assi, victim of the "Sweet Bobby" catfishing case against her cousin Simran Bhogal. The case is considered one of the longest catfishing cases in history. The case involved complex factual, legal and evidential tasks and it was eventually conceded with a significant financial settlement by Bhogal to Assi. The case was covered by a podcast and the 2024 Netflix documentary Sweet Bobby.

=== Other notable work ===
In 2025 Cohen represented Charlie Mullins, founder of Pimlico Plumbers, before the Honours Committee after Mr Mullins was told that his OBE Award was at risk of being forfeited following a series of alleged offensive comments he allegedly made on social media. No order was made against Mr Mullins and he was eventually allowed to keep the award.

== Media and other publications ==
Cohen has been featured as Lawyer of the Week by The Times, and his work was featured in Forbes, Daily Telegraph, Bloomberg and the Law Society Gazette. He has made a number of newspaper contributions including to the Mail Plus, and is the author of a self-published book, The Net is Closing: Birth of the Internet Police (2015), where he wrote about his early experiences working as an Internet lawyer and his prediction about the future policing of the internet.
