= William Grant Still Arts Center =

Art center

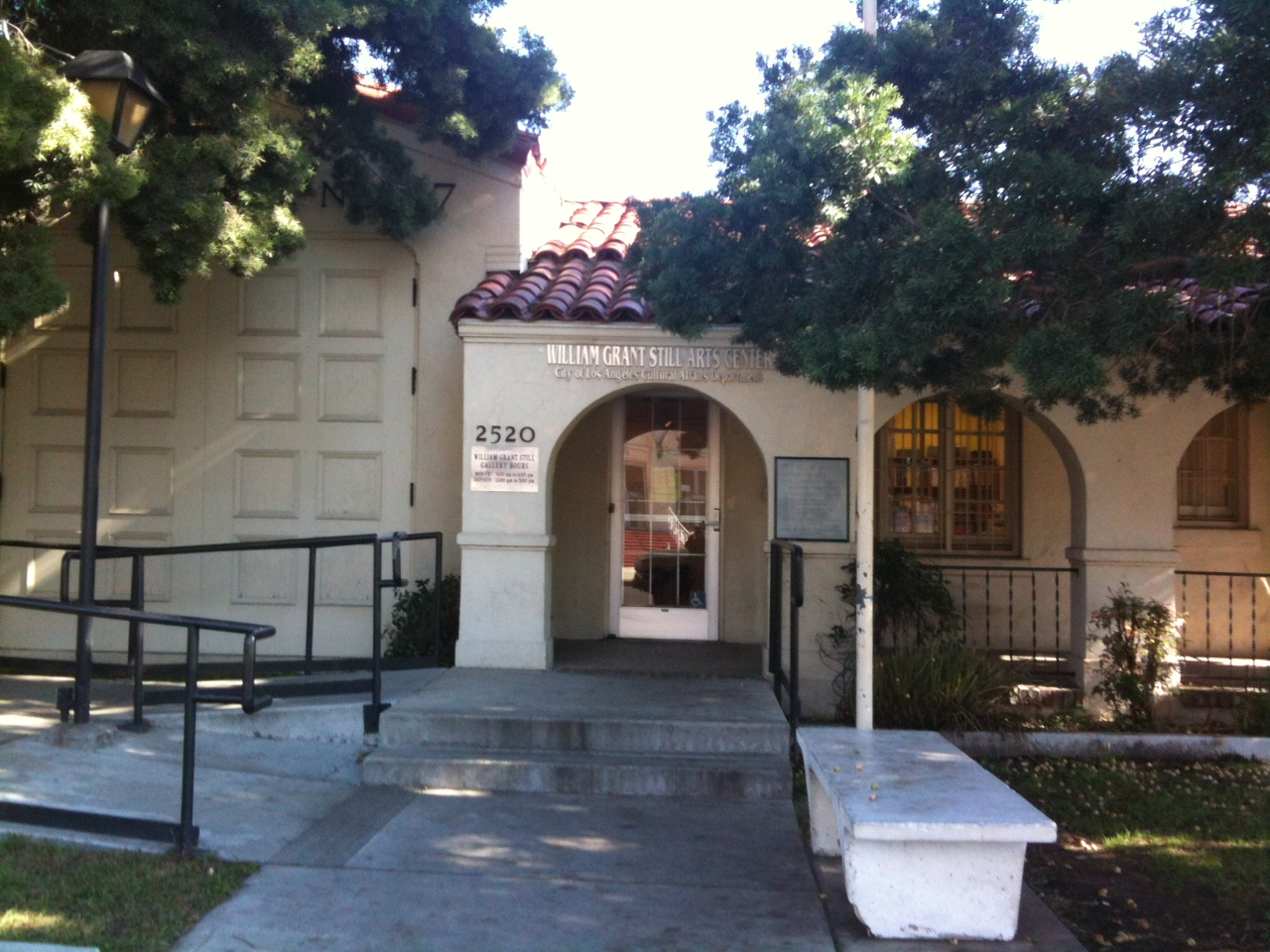
- The William Grant Still Arts Center, 2013
- Address: 2520 S West View Street; Los Angeles, California 90016
- Owner: City of Los Angeles Department of Cultural Affairs
- Public transit: E Line

Construction
- Opened: 1977

Website
- Official website

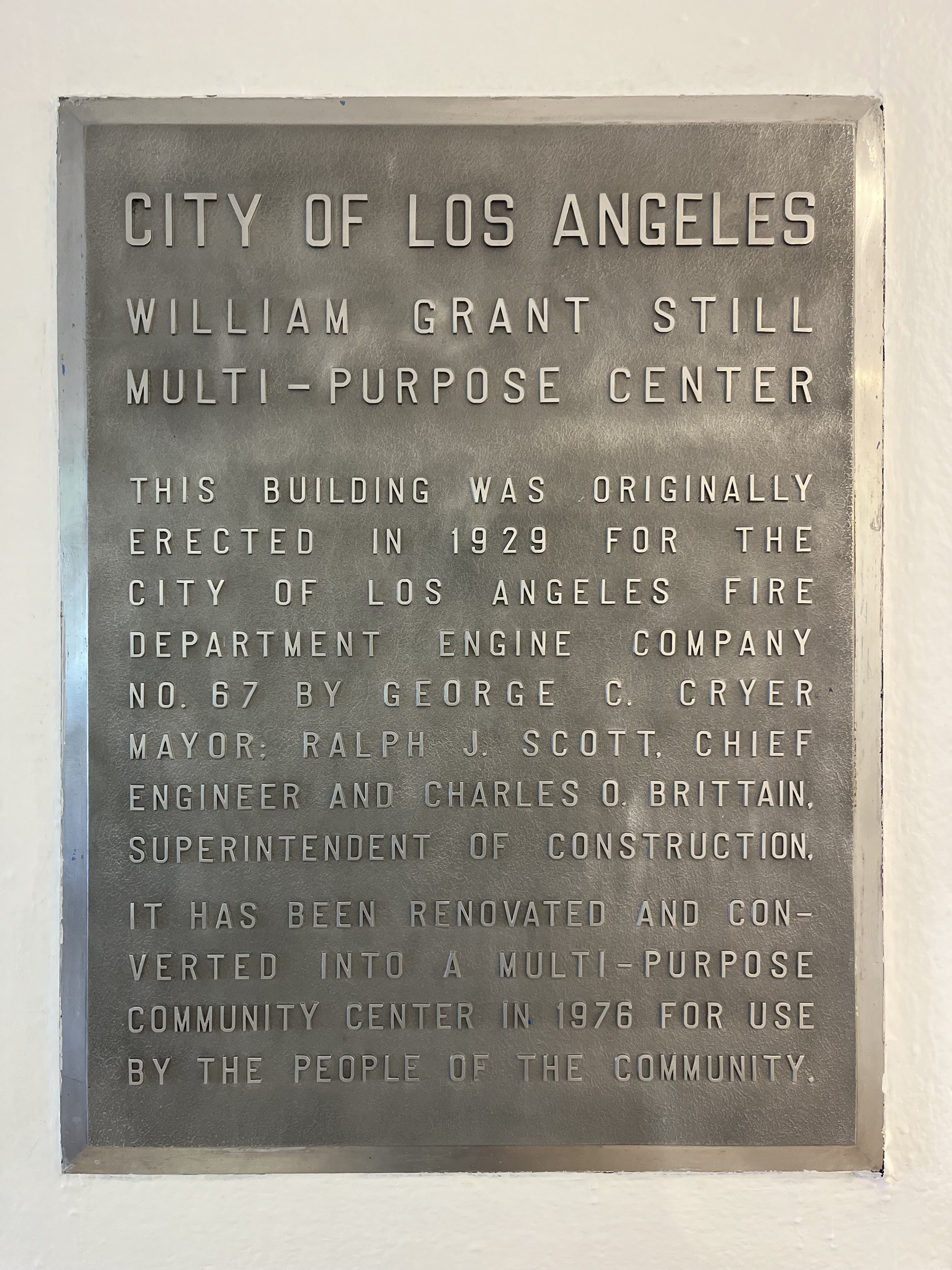
Historical marker located inside of the WGSAC

The William Grant Still Arts Center is located at 2520 S West View Street in Los Angeles, California. Founded in 1977, WGSAC has offered music and art classes for adults and youth, an exhibition space, concerts, and space for community meetings and gatherings for its surrounding neighborhood.

== History ==
The William Grant Still Arts Center was established with in collaboration with the local community and then-councilman David S. Cunningham Jr. The building was constructed in 1929 to for the City of Los Angeles Fire Department Engine Company No. 67. In 1976, the building was renovated to serve as a community arts facility for the City of Los Angeles Department of Cultural Affairs. In 1977, it was transformed into a community arts center with a central exhibition space in the main rotunda, exhibition and meeting rooms, offices, kitchen, and outdoor patio and amphitheater.

The center was named in honor of composer Dr. William Grant Still. "Troubled Island," the opera Dr. Still wrote with a libretto by Langston Hughes, is commemorated on the south side of the building in the alleyway in a 2003 mural created by artist Noni Olabisi, with assistance from Brother Boko.

== Exhibitions ==
The center’s calendar operates in four quarters, each one dedicated to specific cultural themes and artistic disciplines.

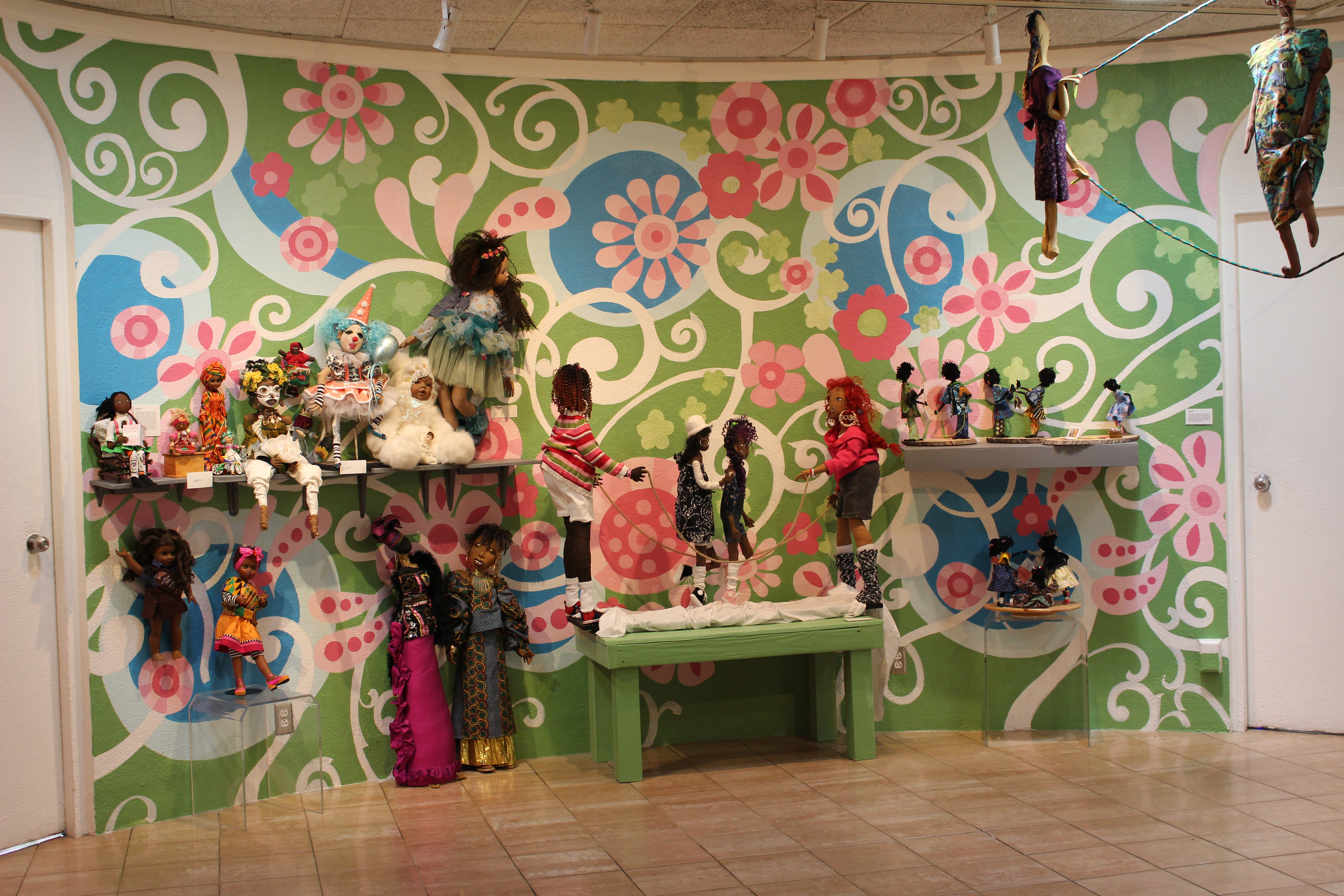
Rotunda view of 38th Annual Black Doll Show, 2018

=== Annual Black Doll Show ===
For nearly 40 years, the William Grant Still Arts Center has presented the Annual Black Doll Show, an original exhibition of Black dolls from artists, collectors, and the local community.

=== Black Doll Show exhibitions ===
1981 – 1st Annual – African American Dolls

1982 – 2nd Annual – Black Doll Exhibit

1983 – 3rd Annual – It's A Small World

1984 – Historical Odyssey of Black Dolls

1985 – 5th Annual - Time Capsule of Dolls

1986 – 6th Annual - Puppets and Puppeteers, The African American Image

1988 – 8th Annual - The Genius of the Black Doll - From Slavery to the Twenty First Century

1989 – 9th Annual - Symmetry - A Comparison of Dolls and Puppets

1990 – 10th Annual - Black Dolls of the World: 10th Anniversary

1991 – 11th Annual – Dolls: Past and Present

1992 – 12th Annual - Moving Parts - Puppet Images of the African Diaspora

1993 – 13th Annual – Handmade Dolls

1994 – 14th Annual - Doll as Companion, Image and Treasure

1995 – 15th Annual Black Dolls Are Maker’s Wonder

1996 – 16th Annual - Adventures in Dollhouse Land

1997 – 17th Annual - Past to Present

1998 – 18th Annual - Dolls: Social-Political Images, Collectibles & Toys

1999 – 19th Annual - A Century of African American Dolls: The Pride and Politics of Portrayal

2000 – 20th Annual - Futuristic Dreams and Fantasies

2002 – 21st Annual - A Salute to Doll Artists

2003 – 23rd Annual - A Salute to Doll Artists

2004 – 24th Annual - From the Cotton Fields to the New Millennium

2005 – 25th Annual - Lemons to Lemonade

2006 – 26th Annual - Lemons to Lemonade

2008 – 28th Annual - Dolls of Color Around the World

2009 – 29th Annual - I’ve got a Story to Tell

2010 – 30th Annual - The 3Rs - Remember, Recycle, Revive

2011 – 31st Annual - The Politics of Imagery

2012 – 32nd Annual - Space is the Place

2013 – 33rd Annual - Dolls Gone Wild

2014 – 34th Annual - A League Supreme

2015 – 35th Annual - Trench Art Retrospective: The War Against HIV/AIDS – Women Of The African Diaspora In The Trenches

2016 – 36th Annual - Paper Plastic Ceramic and Wood

2017 – 37th Annual - Jubilee, Celebrations in Color

2018 – 38th Annual - Double Dutch: A Celebration of Black Girlhood

2019 – 39th Annual - Psychedollia

2020 – 40th Annual - All Dolled Up: A 40 Year Celebration of the WGSAC Annual Black Doll Show

2021 – 41st Annual - Black Doll Magic

2022 – 42nd Annual - Fun and Games

=== The African American Composers Series ===
==== African American Composers exhibitions ====
2009 – Charles Mingus

2010 – The High Priest of Bop – The Jazz Odyssey of Thelonious Monk

2011 – A New Day – Nina Simone

2012 – Deeds Not Words – The Life and Work of Max Roach & Abbey Lincoln

2013 – Arkestry of the Cosmos – The Universe Language of Sun Ra

2014 – I Got My Pride – The Blues Tales of Lead belly

2015 – Love You Madly – A Portrait of Duke Ellington

2016 – So What! The Artistry of Miles Davis

2017 – Nearly Gone Gal: The Rescued Archives of Nellie Lutcher

2019 – Music is Art, Music is Philosophy, Music is History: The Legacy of Dr. William Grant Still 2018 – How the West Got Funked Up!

2020 – Spanish Grease – Willie Bobo

=== Fall Exhibition Series ===
==== Fall exhibitions ====
2011 – Hell No! We Won't Go!: 50 Years of the Student Non-violent Coordinating Committee (SNCC)

2012 – Dragon’s Flight

2013 – Tequio Aqui, Tequio Alla

2014 – Return of the Mecca: The Art of Islam and Hip-Hop

2016 – Intersections: Valena Broussard Dismukes

2017 – A Woman’s Place

2018 – Making the Divine from the Disposable: Teresa Tolliver

2019 – Legacy: Rocking the Nation (RTN), 30 Years of Creativity

== Educational programs ==
Educational programs include art, movement and music classes for seniors, adults, teens, children, including early childhood education.

In 2015, the WGSAC and community members collaborated with professional archivists and local historians to develop West Adams Collectors Club, took place over the course of eight Saturdays from March 14 – May 2, 2015.

=== Art & Jazz Summer Day Camp ===
Art and Jazz Summer day camp for ages 3–12, jazz-based ensemble instruction, partnerships with teachers at local schools and universities; and readings, film screenings, and concerts throughout the year.

=== Community workshops ===
The WGSAC offers community workshops that range from drawing, arts & craft, percussion, keyboard, tap dancing, and physical exercise. The WGSAC also offers doll-making workshops to share the tradition of doll-making practices.

== Directors ==
- Amitis Motevalli (current)
- Joyce Maddox
- James Burks
- Kamau Daaood
- Hakim Ali

== See also ==
- City of Los Angeles Department of Cultural Affairs
- William Grant Still
