= 52nd Daytime Creative Arts & Lifestyle Emmy Awards =

- Date: October 17, 2025
- Location: Pasadena Civic Auditorium; Pasadena, California, U.S.
- Presented by: National Academy of Television Arts and Sciences (NATAS)
- Most awards: Secret Lives of Orangutans and The Secret Lives of Animals (3)
- Most nominations: The Young and the Restless (19)

Television/radio coverage
- Network: watch.theemmys.tv (online only)
- Produced by: Adam Sharp (NATAS); Lisa Armstrong (NATAS)

The 52nd Annual Daytime Creative Arts Emmy Awards, presented by the National Academy of Television Arts and Sciences (NATAS), honored the best in US daytime television programming in 2024. On September 4, it was announced that the 52nd Daytime Emmys and Creative Arts Emmys would be held at Pasadena Civic Auditorium. As of September 17, 2025, the Daytime Emmys would be streamed only. The award ceremony took place on October 17, 2025, in Pasadena.

== Ceremony information ==
NATAS president Adam Sharp announced January 8, 2025, that the Daytime Emmys and the Daytime Creative Arts Emmys would move to October and trade places with the 46th News and Documentary Emmy Awards to highlight the "timely nature" of news and documentary programming. Sharp said of the forty-two categories, "We’re excited to recognize the exceptional individuals and teams who make daytime television great every year and in some cases, every day. As the Daytime landscape continues to expand, we’re excited to introduce new categories to recognize the boundary-pushing work being done." The nominations were announced on July 10, 2025, alongside the nominees for the main ceremony categories and that instead of two separate dates for both ceremonies that there would be one ceremony for both. The same day NATAS announced the enforcement of the rules where any category that has fewer than ten (10) submissions, no more than 50% of submitted entries may be nominated, hence why The Bold and the Beautiful, The Bay, and Neighbours were not nominated. NATAS would honor programming and creative arts & lifestyle from January 1, 2025 through December 31, 2025. Beyond the Gates started broadcasting on CBS and streaming on Paramount + in February 2025 as to why no one or department was nominated from the show. While the ceremony was broadcast on CBS from 2020 to 2024 and streaming on Paramount +, Paramount Global had not signed a new broadcasting agreement with NATAS. Viewers would be able to watch the telecast from their mobile devices, Smart TVs, and many other connected devices such as Apple TV, Roku, Android TV, Fire TV, Chromecast, and iPad. Later in the day on July 10, it was announced that Paramount Global had signed an agreement with NATAS. CBS would broadcast and Paramount + would stream the entire ceremony. On September 4, it was announced the 52nd Daytime Emmys and Creative Arts Emmys would be held at Pasadena Civic Auditorium. On September 17, it was announced the Daytime Emmys would only be streaming, and the host will be Mario Lopez.

=== Category changes ===
- A new category, Outstanding Emerging Talent in a Daytime Drama Series, honors performers who are in their first two years on their first daytime drama series. Unlike the retired Outstanding Younger Performer in a Drama Series and its gender-specific predecessors, there would be no maximum age limit. However, once a performer had won once, they would be disqualified from winning it a second time.
- Outstanding Culinary Program was divided into two specific categories: Outstanding Culinary Instructional Series honoring those shows more instructive in food preparation and cooking, and Outstanding Culinary Cultural Series honoring those shows focused more on the cultural aspects of food.
- Outstanding Travel, Adventure and Nature Program was divided into two specific categories: Outstanding Travel and Adventure Program honoring those shows focused more on travel, and Outstanding Nature and Science Program honoring those shows focused more on the science of the natural world.
- Outstanding Regional Content in a Daytime Genre was created for outstanding regional work that will be awarded with a Crystal Pillar.
- Outstanding Original Song was eliminated.

== Winners and Nominees ==
Winners are listed first, highlighted in boldface, and indicated with a double dagger (‡).

=== Programming ===
Programming
**Outstanding Legal/Courtroom Program**: **Hot Bench (Syndicated)**‡; America's Court with Judge Ross (Syndicated); Divorce Court (Fox); Judy Justice (Amazon Prime Video); Justice for the People with Judge Milian (Syndicated); We The People with Judge Lauren Lake (Syndicated)	**Outstanding Travel and Adventure Program**: **Expedition Unknown (Discovery Channel)**‡; Field Trip with Curtis Stone Hong Kong (PBS); The Good Road (PBS); How I Got Here (BYUtv); Joseph Rosendo's Steppin' Out (PBS); Mexico Made With Love (PBS)
**Outstanding Culinary Cultural Series**: **Chasing Flavor with Carla Hall (HBO / Max)**‡; BBQ High (Magnolia Network); Ingrediente: Mexico (Amazon Prime Video); TrueSouth (ESPN / ABC / SEC Network)	**Outstanding Culinary Instructional Series**: **Delicious Miss Brown (Food Network)**‡; Be My Guest with Ina Garten (Food Network); Emeril Cooks (Roku); Lidia's Kitchen (PBS); Selena + Restaurant (Food Network)
**Outstanding Science and Nature Program**: **The Secret Lives of Animals (Apple TV+)**‡; Living with Leopards (Netflix); National Parks: USA (National Geographic); Secret Lives of Orangutans (Netflix); Secrets of the Neanderthals (Netflix)	**Outstanding Lifestyle Program**: **You Are What You Eat: A Twin Experiment (Netflix)**‡; George to the Rescue (NBC); Hack Your Health: The Secrets of Your Gut (Netflix); Harlem Globetrotters: Play It Forward (NBC); Homegrown (Magnolia Network)
**Outstanding Arts and Popular Culture Program**: **Black Barbie: A Documentary (Netflix)**‡; Folk Americana Roots Hall of Fame (PBS); Off Script With The Hollywood Reporter (IFC); The Swift Effect (Peacock); Variety Studio: Actors on Actors (PBS)	**Outstanding Daytime Special**: **Disney Parks Magical Christmas Day Parade (ABC)**‡; Bob Newhart: A Legacy of Laughter: An “Entertainment Tonight” Special (CBS); Dinner Party Diaries with José Andrés (Amazon Prime Video); 98th Annual Macy's Thanksgiving Day Parade (NBC); Shelter Me: The Cancer Pioneers (PBS)
**Outstanding Instructional/How-To Program**: **Fixer Upper: The Lakehouse (Magnolia Network)**‡; Dime Como Hacerlo (The Roku Channel); The Fixers (BYUtv); Going Home with Tyler Cameron (Amazon Prime Video); Married to Real Estate (HGTV); Martha Gardens (The Roku Channel)	**Outstanding Short Form Program**: **Ballin' Out (Outsports)**‡; Billboard Presents (Billboard); Catalyst (LinkedIn News); Eat This With Yara: The Chef Preserving Gaza’s Cuisine Amid a Genocide (AJ+); Live Like A Champion (Healthline)
**Outstanding Regional Content in a Daytime Genre**: **Createid SARA: A Life in Dreams and Symbols (Idaho Public Television)**‡; Chicagoland's Best Bites (WMAQ-TV); Danzando para Sanar (WWDT-TV); Hidden Homicide (WGN-TV); Relish (Twin Cities PBS)

=== Hosting & Daytime Personality ===
Crafts
**Outstanding Culinary Show Host**: **Kardea Brown – Delicious Miss Brown (Food Network)**‡; Joanna Gaines – Magnolia Table with Joanna Gaines (Magnolia Network); Ina Garten – Be My Guest with Ina Garten (Food Network); Emeril Lagasse – Emeril Cooks (The Roku Channel); Michael Symon – Symon’s Dinners Cooking Out (Food Network)	**Outstanding Personality – Non Daily**: **Sir David Attenborough – Secret Lives of Orangutans (Netflix)**‡; Brad Bestelink – Living with Leopards (Netflix); Andi Sweeney Blanco, Courtney Dober, Rob North, Kirin Stone – The Fixers (BYUtv); Anthony Mackie – Shark Beach with Anthony Mackie: Gulf Coast (National Geographic); Martha Stewart – Martha Gardens (The Roku Channel)

=== Crafts ===
Crafts
**Outstanding Directing Team for a Daytime Drama Series**: **General Hospital – Jillian Dedote, Tina Keller, Robert Markham, Allison Reames Smith, Gary Tomlin, Frank Valentini, Denise Van Cleave, Teresa Cicala, Peter Fillmore, Paul S. Glass, Nate Hapke, Marika Kushel, Dave MacLeod, Christine Magarian Ucar, Kelli Kuschman, Elizabeth McCann, Kyle Bell, and Craig McManus (ABC)**‡; Days of our Lives – Sonia Blangiardo, Noel Maxam, Scott McKinsey, Kevin Church, Michael Fiamingo, Joseph Lumer, Sara Peterson McCormick, Holly Metts, Adriana Alvarado, Alexis Straiten, Jennifer Werwage, Jessie Harrison, Lucy Yalenian (Peacock); The Young and the Restless – Michael Eilbaum, Sally McDonald, Nancy Ortenberg, Owen Renfroe, Steven Williford, Derek Berlatsky, Andrew Hachem, Robbin Phillips, Jennifer Bisgrove, Alexandra Jensen, Andrew Wells, Martin Fritz Brekeller, Kristin Doherty (CBS)	**Outstanding Writing Team for a Daytime Drama Series**: **General Hospital – Elizabeth Korte, Patrick Mulcahey, Dan O'Connor, Chris Van Etten, Emily Culliton, Suzanne Flynn, Cathy LePard, Anne Schoettle, Charlotte Gibson, Kate Hall, Stacey Pulwer, and Scott Sickles (ABC)**‡; Days of our Lives – Ron Carlivati, Jeanne Marie Ford, Jamey Giddens, Katherine Schock, Ryan Quan, Sonja Alarr, Kirk Doering, Christopher Dunn, David Kreizman, Fran Myers, Henry Newman, Dave Ryan (Peacock); The Young and the Restless – Josh Griffith, Amanda L. Beall, Jeff Beldner, Marla Kanelos, Susan Banks, James Harmon Brown, Janice Ferri Esser, Marin Gazzaniga, Lindsay Harrison, Rebecca McCarty, Madeleine Phillips, Dave Ryan (CBS)
**Outstanding Writing Team for a Daytime Non-Fiction Program**: **Black Barbie: A Documentary – Lagueria Davis (Netflix)**‡; Modern Pioneering with Georgia Pellegrini – Georgia Pellegrini and Judd Walker (PBS); National Parks: USA – Avela Grenier, Kyle McCabe, and Jeff Reed (National Geographic); Secret Lives of Orangutans – Huw Cordey (Netflix); Shelter Me: The Cancer Pioneers – Samantha Jones, Steven Latham, and Conrad Stanley (PBS)	**Outstanding Directing Team for a Single Camera Daytime Non-Fiction Program**: **Secret Lives of Orangutans – Huw Cordey (Netflix)**‡; Living with Leopards – Alex Parkinson (Netflix); Mutual of Omaha's Wild Kingdom Protecting the Wild – Phil Fairclough, Eric Mazer, and John Murphy (NBC); The Secret Lives of Animals – Simon Baxter, Matthew Clements, David Heath, Mags Lightbody, and Victoria Webb (Apple TV+); Shark Beach with Anthony Mackie: Gulf Coast – Matt Kay (National Geographic)
**Outstanding Directing Team for a Multiple Camera Daytime Non-Fiction Program**: **The Drew Barrymore Show – Scot Titelbaum, Sara Tannor, Veda Carey, and Liz Keane (Syndicated)**‡; Disney Parks Magical Christmas Day Parade – Sam Wrench (ABC); The Good Road – Andrew Duensing (PBS); The Kelly Clarkson Show – Joe Terry, Diana Horn, Brendan Higgins, Cyndi Owgang, and David Salas (Syndicated); The Wizard of Paws – Hannah Altschwager (BYUtv)	**Outstanding Music Direction and Composition**: **Secret Lives of Orangutans – David Mitcham and Michael Whight (Netflix)**‡; Mysteries of the Terracotta Warriors (Netflix); National Parks: USA – Colin Clark (National Geographic); The Secret Lives of Animals – Kyle Rodriguez (Apple TV+); Secrets of the Neanderthals – Anže Rozman, Enzo Hwang, Kara Talve, Russell Emanuel, and Greg Rappaport (Netflix)
**Outstanding Technical Direction, Camerawork, Video**: **Disney Parks Magical Christmas Day Parade – Dylan Sanford, Rick Siegel, Brett Turnbull, James Coker, Joe Daleki, Derek Wojtkun, Scott Acosta, John Atkinson, Ryan Balton, Manny Bonilla, William Christensen, Michael Cruickshank, Rob Curschman, Luis Lopez Devictoria, Chris Ferguson, Sean Flannery, Rick Fontanez, Jonny Harkins, Travis Hays, Shawn Hiatt, Sebastian Lumme, Andrew Moore, Matthew Roe, and Fed Wetherbee (ABC)**‡; The Drew Barrymore Show – Dave Saretsky, Augie Yuson, Al Cialino, Nick Fayo, Jesse Green, Eddie Lenzo, Chris Push, Dylan Whitman, and Mark Whitman (Syndicated); Neighbours – Heath Kerr (Amazon Prime Video); The View – Eric Gruszecki, John Kokinis, Andrew Capuano, David Dainoff, Michael Danisi, Nick Davis, Donato De Pasquale, Nick Fayo, Rob Feder, Carlos Flynn, Anthony Ioannou, Hardy Kluender, Douglas Schneider, Zachary Solomon, and Jim Tomlinson (ABC); The Young and the Restless – Michael Hoorn, Andrew Clark, Kathryn Hammond, Josh Llorico, William Looper, Roberto Bosio, and Taylor Campanian (CBS)	**Outstanding Cinematography**: **National Parks: USA – Jason Ching, Jake Hewitt, Thomas Miller, Brandon Navratil, Jeff Reed, and Rick Smith (National Geographic)**‡; Living with Leopards – Kyle De Nobrega, Steven Dover, Noah Falklind, Greg Hartman, Gaokgonwe Seetsele Nthomiwa, Henry Smith, Rich Uren, Tristen Woodward, Brad Bestelink, and Paul Williams (Netflix); Mysteries of the Terracotta Warriors – Jian Liwei, Zheng Yi, Graham Boonzaaier, Tian Feng, and Rachel Liew (Netflix); The Secret Lives of Animals – Scott Abraham, Graham MacFarlane, Sam Oakes, and Mark Payne-Gill (Apple TV+); Secret Lives of Orangutans – Zaid Abdulah, Matt Aeberhard, Yuzuru Masuda, Tom Rowland, Tania Esteban, and George Woodcock (Netflix)
**Outstanding Single Camera Editing**: **The Secret Lives of Animals – Caroline Hamilton and Khara Stibbons (Apple TV+)**‡; Hack Your Health: The Secrets of Your Gut – Lee Rosch and Oscar Vazquez (Netflix); Mysteries of the Terracotta Warriors – Simon Barker, Brett Irwin, Ash Jenkins, Nick Price, and Xavier Russell (Netflix); Secret Lives of Orangutans – Charles Dyer and Khara Stibbons (Netflix); Secrets of the Neanderthals – Graeme Dawson (Netflix)	**Outstanding Multiple Camera Editing for a Series**: **Resurrected Rides – Patrick Berry, Stuart Brodlieb, Jesse Soff, Bryn Vytlacil, Andy Carney, Brad Haley, and Robb Roetman (Netflix)**‡; Disney Parks Magical Christmas Day Parade – Kim Brown, John Cox, Bill Deronde, Jose Favela, John Francis, Kari Havenrich, Hamish Lyons, Mike Polito, Jonathon Ragsdale, and Dom Whitworth (ABC); The Fixers – John Barrett and Harry Walsh (BYUtv); How I Got Here – Kailey Birk and Derek Espositio (BYUtv); The Kelly Clarkson Show – Stas Lipovetskiy, Kliff Svatos, and Sam Goldfien (Syndicated)
**Outstanding Live Sound Mixing and Sound Editing**: **The Kelly Clarkson Show – James Slanger, Rachel Orscher, Robert Venable, Omatali Beckett, Bob Lewis, Rosa Howell-Thornhill, Marilyn Vigilante, and Bryan Smith (Syndicated)**‡; The Talk – Chris Rich, Brent Arledge, Greg Ferrara, Krista Fetterer, Barry Warrick, and Rod Iacono (CBS); The View – Gennadiy Giller, Daryl Bornstein, Chris Murphy, Bogdan Hernick, Rob Gigliuto, Michael Glazier, Matthew Miranda, Samuel A Rollins, Joanna Staub, Shawn Walsh, and Martin Yee (ABC); The Young and the Restless – Andrzej Warzocha, Dean Johnson, Malcolm Arnold, Frankie Galvez, Joseph Lawrence, Tom Luth, and Giovanni Meza (CBS)	**Outstanding Sound Mixing and Sound Editing**: **The Secret Lives of Animals – Ellie Bowler, Rory Joseph, Myles Ackerman Smith, George Baynes, and Ben Peace (Apple TV+)**‡; Hack Your Health: The Secrets of Your Gut – Conner Moore, Brian Riordan, Graham Barclay, Louie Recinos, Josh Reinhardt, and Omar Barraza (Netflix); Joseph Rosendo's Steppin' Out – Michael Faner, Jason Grigg, and Jason Grigg (PBS); Living with Leopards – Tim Owens, Owen Peters, Owen Shirley, Paul Ackerman, Hannah Gregory, and Ben Peace (Netflix); National Parks: USA – Brian Eimer (National Geographic); Secret Lives of Orangutans – Kate Hopkins, Tim Owens, Ellie Bowler, Barnaby Malins, Paul Ackerman, and Andy Devine (Netflix); Secrets of the Neanderthals – Tom Foster, Ross Millership, Freddie Claire, Alan Hill, Andy Hoare, Nathan Kendall, Filip Lledinščak, Stuart Thompson, and Chris Youle-Grayling (Netflix)
**Outstanding Lighting Direction for a Series**: **The Kelly Clarkson Show – Darren Langer and John Daniels (Syndicated)**‡; Days of Our Lives – David Meagher and Billy Yakes (Peacock); The Young and the Restless – Edward Burgess, Chuck Conklin, and Cameron Saenz (CBS); The Drew Barrymore Show – Bob Barnhart, Dave Grill, and Shawn Kaufman (Syndicated); The View – James Gallagher (ABC)	**Outstanding Main Title and Graphic Design**: **Hack Your Health: The Secrets of Your Gut – Pénélope De Bozzi, Matthieu Lemarié, Constance Robin, Benjamin Arthur, Laura Venditti, John-Daniel Arauz, Sean Martin, Callum Reid, Aaron Schmit, Suzie Bergeron, and Emma Biernat (Netflix)**‡; Car Masters: Rust to Riches – Brandon Thomas Irwin (Netflix); The Drew Barrymore Show – Megan Mucci, Alyssa Medina, and Andy Turnbull (Syndicated); Reconnecting Roots – Adam Moore, Gabe McCauley, Beaux Latham, Luis Mejía, Jonathan Richter, Ryan Estabrooks, and Wesley Vis (PBS); Tex Mex Motors – Brandon Thomas Irwin (Netflix)
**Outstanding Casting**: **Days of our Lives – Marnie Saitta and Bob Lambert (Peacock)**‡; General Hospital – Mark Teschner and Lisa Booth (ABC); Making Good – Erin Sleater and Ron Johnson (BYUtv); Start Up – Jenny Feterovich (PBS); The Young and the Restless – Gregory Salmon (CBS)	**Outstanding Art Direction/Set Decoration/Scenic Design**: **Mysteries of the Terracotta Warriors – Zorana Zhi Zheng (Netflix)**‡; The Drew Barrymore Show – Kate Duffy, Diann Duthie, Tom Lenz, Mel Lovrik, and Lauren Ringer (Syndicated); The Kelly Clarkson Show – James Connelly, Jason Kirschner, and Kait Taylor (Syndicated); Live with Kelly and Mark – Michael Fagin and Michael Carnahan (Syndicated); The Young and the Restless – David Hoffmann, Jennifer Savala, Maria Dirolf, Jennifer Haybach, Monica Lowe, and Justine Mercado (CBS)
**Outstanding Costume Design/Styling**: **General Hospital – Julianna Bolles Morrison, Shawn Reeves, William H. Hoffman Jr., Elizabeth Jerome, Christina Lim, Margaret Lousen, Alethia Moore, Cesario Ruiz, Christine Shahverdian, Maria Uribe, Alice Volonino, and Asante Wa Young (ABC)**‡; The Drew Barrymore Show – Lee Harris and Matthew Kilgore (Syndicated); Mysteries of the Terracotta Warriors – Hu Kaiwen and Sun Meilin (Netflix); Sherri – Willie Sinclair III and Chanel Smith (Syndicated); The Young and the Restless – Mandi Line, David Zyla, Craig Aspden, Scott Burkhart, Samantha Burpee, Lindsay Halfhill, Juliet Huerta, Tony Lorito, Polina Roytman-Purcell, and Laura Tiefer (CBS)	**Outstanding Hairstyling and Makeup**: **The Drew Barrymore Show – Lauren Gulino, Joanna Pisani, and Daniel Howell (Syndicated)**‡; The Bold and the Beautiful – Christine Lai Johnson, Daniela Delgado, Briana Garcia, Toby Lamm, Stephanie Paugh, Karlye Buff, Danielle Dubinsky, and Alexis Reyes (CBS); General Hospital – Karol Moses, Luiza Adzhiyan, Samantha Barrows, Gayatri Bhamidipaty, Wendy Fisher Spears, Heather Pepe, Priscilla Castro Preciado, Jacklyn Quackenbush, Stephanie Riley, Alexandra Fleck Whittle, Anzhela Adzhiyan, Gabriella Di Pinto, Aura Moreno, Wendy Giraldo Pineda, Priscilla Quiroz, Abraham Joseph Rivera, and Feanna Smith (ABC); The Jennifer Hudson Show – Marie-Flore Beaubien, Jennifer Fregozo, Adam Burrell, Robear Landeros, and Albert Morrison (Syndicated); Secrets of the Neanderthals – Svetlana Gutic, Antonela Matović, Matea Milanovic, Suzi Battersby, Megan Thomas, Chloe Henderson, Ashra Kelly-Blue, and Ruth Parry (Netflix); The Kelly Clarkson Show – Monica Boyd Lester, Louie Zakarian, Korynn Gonzalez-Novotny, Adam Long, Kerry Joly, Kim Weber, Corey Morris, Gloria Elias-Foeillet, Brittany Hartman, Louie Zakarian, Kyle Krueger, Christopher Milone, and Chelsea Paige (Syndicated); Sherri – Rodney Jon, Theo Barrett, Jaime Alcivar, Yanira Garcia, Diana Li, and Irving Ramirez (Syndicated)

== Most Nominations ==
Programs with the Most Nominations (across all categories)
Program	Noms	Genre
The Young and the Restless	19	Daytime Drama Series
General Hospital	16	Daytime Drama Series
Days of Our Lives	13	Daytime Drama Series
The Drew Barrymore Show	9	Daytime Talk Series
The Kelly Clarkson Show	8	Daytime Talk Series
Secret Lives of Orangutans	8	Science & Nature Special
Mysteries of the Terracotta Warriors	6	Science & Nature Special
The Secret Lives of Animals	6	Science & Nature Special
Living with Leopards	5	Science & Nature Special
National Parks: USA	5	Science & Nature Special
Secrets of the Neanderthals	5	Science & Nature Special
Hack Your Health: The Secrets of Your Gut	4	Science & Nature Special
Joseph Rosendo's Steppin' Out	2	Science & Nature Special
Shark Beach with Anthony Mackie: Gulf Coast	2	Science & Nature Special
Shelter Me: The Cancer Pioneers	2	Science & Nature Special
