= Antares de la Luz =

Chilean musician and leader of a doomsday-oriented religious sect

- Born: Ramón Gustavo Castillo Gaete; 20 December 1977; Santiago, Chile
- Died: 1 May 2013 (aged 35); Cusco, Peru
- Cause of death: Suicide by hanging
- Education: Metropolitan University of Educational Sciences
- Occupations: Musician and cult leader
- Years active: 2009–2013
- Children: 1
- Capture status: Committed suicide before being captured

Details
- Victims: 1
- Date: 23 November 2012

Ramón Gustavo Castillo Gaete (20 December 1977 – 1 May 2013) was a Chilean murderer and leader of a doomsday-oriented religious sect stationed in Colliguay, a rural area in the Valparaíso Region, where he claimed to be the second coming of Jesus and was known as "Antares de la Luz" (from Spanish, "Antares of the Light").

In 2012, one of the cult members, 25-year-old Natalia Guerra, became pregnant with his child, who he believed to be the Antichrist. Castillo's infant son was ultimately immolated in a bonfire on 23 November of that year as a human sacrifice, to prevent the supposedly incoming end of the world on 21 December 2012. After Chilean authorities were informed of the murder in April 2013, a nationwide manhunt headed by the Investigations Police of Chile began, which soon spread to neighboring Bolivia and Peru, the latter of which, is where he hanged himself to evade capture.

== Biography ==
Castillo studied pedagogy at the Metropolitan University of Educational Sciences. He allegedly skipped doing his country's then-obligatory military service with the help of his aunt, a medical doctor, who created a fraudulent certificate claiming that Castillo suffered from some sort of mental insanity.

A musician by trade, he joined the musical group Amaru from 2003 until 2006, playing the clarinet, zampoña and quena. At some point in 2006, his musical group traveled to China, where he was interested in the local alternative medicine and folk religion. While there, he adopted his religious nickname, "Antares of the dark", in reference to Antares, the brightest star in the Scorpius constellation.

Around 2009, he parted from the group and founded his religious cult, living with all the members in a shared apartment in Las Condes, where they performed healing rituals under the name of "Calypso". They soon relocated to Olmué, San José de Maipo, Concón and finally Mantagua, where they often performed animal sacrifices. Within his 12-member-cult, members often consumed various hallucinogenic drugs, mostly consisting of ayahuasca-derived substances. He maintained sexual relationships with all of the women, which he saw as a religious tradition.

Natalia Guerra Jequier, one of the members, soon became pregnant and gave birth to Jesús Castillo Guerra on 21 November 2012, at a clinic in Reñaca. The following day, Castillo took the baby without the knowledge of the clinical staff to prevent his son's birth from being registered at the Civil Registry of Chile, as he claimed to believe his son to be the antichrist and planned on sacrificing him to prevent the 2012 doomsday prediction from becoming true.

On 23 November, at around 11:30 PM, Jesús Castillo was placed on a wooden board and his mouth taped over to prevent him from screaming. After this, the cult members performed a religious chant and threw the infant, still alive, on a lit bonfire, where he immediately died at 2 days of age. After this, "Antares" informed his followers that the "end of the world" had been rescheduled to occur 10 days later, and that they must remain in the same place to await further instructions. Upon waiting that time and seeing nothing happened, Antares de la Luz again addressed his followers and told them that the end of the world would now happen on 21 November 2017 and that they must now move to Ecuador and wait for it to occur. After this event, multiple cult members lost faith in Castillo and abandoned the group before reporting the events to authorities.

The Investigations Police of Chile (Policía de Investigaciones, PDI) began a nationwide manhunt to find Castillo. Four people, including the boy's mother, were soon arrested, and confirmed that Castillo had traveled to Peru with a sum of 15,000,000 Chilean pesos which he got from one of his followers selling a parcel of land in the area. Peruvian police forces soon joined in on the search along with Interpol. On 2 May 2013, Castillo's body was found hanging from a noose in an abandoned house in the Peruvian city of Cusco, an apparent victim of suicide by hanging.

== Legacy ==
Most of the cult members were legally declared innocent from taking part in the murder by reason of insanity, as they truly believed that Castillo was a god. Pablo Undurraga, Castillo's most important follower, was given 1 year of prison time to be served at the Santiago High Security Prison before being placed under home arrest, eventually being acquitted by insanity as well. Natalia Guerra, the boy's mother, remained on the run until 2019, when she was arrested and sentenced to five years of prison time. She was freed on parole in 2021.
