= Divorce (2024 film) =

2024 film by Michał Chaciński and Radosław Drabik

- Netflix poster
- Polish: Rozwodnicy
- Directed by: Michał Chaciński; Radosław Drabik
- Written by: Michał Chaciński; Łukasz Światowiec
- Produced by: Radosław Drabik
- Starring: Magdalena Popławska; Wojciech Mecwaldowski
- Cinematography: Mateusz Pastewka
- Edited by: Magdalena Chowańska
- Music by: Łukasz Targosz
- Production company: Gigant Films
- Distributed by: Netflix
- Release date: 25 September 2024
- Running time: 91 minutes
- Country: Poland
- Language: Polish

Divorce (Polish: Rozwodnicy, lit. 'Divorcees') is a 2024 Polish film directed by Michał Chaciński and Radosław Drabik. It is a remake of the 2022 Lithuanian film Parade by Titas Laucius. It was released on Netflix on 25 September 2024.

== Premise ==
Years after their split, a divorced couple attempts to validate their annulment with their church.

== Cast ==
- Magdalena Popławska as Małgosia
- Wojciech Mecwaldowski as Jacek
- Oliwia Drabik as Ala
- Tomasz Schuchardt as Andrzej
- Michalina Łabacz as Monika
- Aleksandra Grabowska as Ilona
- Michał Pawlik as Father Tomek
- Szymon Kuśmider as Father Marian
- Dorota Piasecka as Krystyna
- Artur Kozłowski as Filip
- Stanisław Cywka as Tomek
- Michał Majnicz as Jacek's friend
- Jakub Wieczorek as Waldek
- Adam Cywka as Father Przemysław
- Karolina Tomaszewska as Aniela Miłkowska

== Production and release ==
The film was announced on 19 February 2023 under the working title Divorcees. A trailer was released on 30 April 2024. The film was released on Netflix on 25 September 2024. Within a week of its release, it was viewed over 3.1 million times and reached No. 1 on the Polish Netflix charts.
