= Lagueria Davis =

American film director

- Born: 8 February; Fort Worth, Texas, U.S.
- Occupations: Director, writer, producer, editor
- Years active: 2007-present

Lagueria Davis is an American film director, writer and producer. She is best known for her work on the films Light in Dark Places, 1 in 3, and Black Barbie: A Documentary, winner of two Daytime Emmy Awards.

== Career ==
Davis holds a BFA in Media Art from the University of Oklahoma. Remember Me a pilot she wrote was a 2016 WeScreenplay TV competition semi-finalist. Maid of Dishonor a feature she co-wrote was a Nicholls Fellowship Quarter-Finalist in 2016. Her short film, Light in Dark Places, won best short film at the 2019 ClexaCon Film Festival.

Davis was selected as a 2019 BAVC Media Maker Fellow with her project, Black Barbie: A Documentary. In 2025, the film won Daytime Emmy Awards for Outstanding Arts and Popular Culture Program and Outstanding Writing Team for a Daytime Non-Fiction Program.

She is a board member of the Alliance of Women Directors.

== Filmography ==
Year	Title	Writer	Director	Producer	Note
2007	Broken, Floating, Diving, Hoping...	✓	✓	✗	Short Film
2007	That in-Between Place	✓	✓	✗	Short Film
2008	Text Book Love Story	✓	✓	✗	Short Film
2009	Help Yourself	✓	✓	✗	Short Film
2010	1 in 3	✓	✓	✗	Feature Film
2014	Rods and Cones	✗	✗	✓	5 episodes
2015	Parking	✓	✓	✗	Documentary
2017	The Exchange	✓	✓	✓	8 episodes
2018	Light in Dark Places	✓	✓	✓	Short film
2023	Black Barbie: A Documentary	✓	✓	✓	Documentary
