= Georgia Pellegrini =

American chef and author

- Born: February 25, 1981 (age 45); Sparkill, New York, United States, North America
- Education: Wellesley College
- Spouse: Judd Walker
- Website: https://georgiapellegrini.com

Georgia Pellegrini (born February 25, 1981) is an American author, speaker, chef, outdoor adventure expert, and host of the TV show Modern Pioneering, which won the 2021 Taste Award for Best New Series. She also hosted the TV show Wild Food on Discovery Networks.

Pellegrini's books include Modern Pioneering, Girl Hunter, and Food Heroes.

== Biography ==
=== Early years ===
Pellegrini was born in Sparkill, New York to photographer Roger Pellegrini (1948 – 9 April 2019) and actress Maureen Mooney. She grew up on the same land that her great-grandfather owned and worked, Tulipwood. She graduated from the Chapin School in New York City and then from Wellesley College, with a degree in International Relations.

After stints in investment banking, Pellegrini enrolled at the French Culinary Institute. Soon she began to work in farm to table restaurants in the U.S. (Gramercy Tavern and Blue Hill at Stone Barns) and France (La Chassagnette), driving heavy farm equipment, and harvesting both meat and plants for dinner.

=== Television ===
Pellegrini is the host of the TV show "Modern Pioneering" on American Public Television, which won the 2021 Taste Award for Best New Series. She also hosted "Wild Food" on Discovery Network's Destination America.

=== Books ===
In her latest book, Modern Pioneering, Pellegrini teaches modern day pioneer skills and "manual literacy". It is a cookbook and backyard gardening and homesteading guide for people who want to grow food efficiently, cook seasonal recipes, or even try foraging, camping, and living off the land.

In Girl Hunter, Pellegrini writes about the experience of traveling around the U.S. and abroad to hunt her own meat. She teamed up with veteran hunters to add to the adventures. This book includes recipes as well as descriptions of the many characters she met on her food travels. Girl Hunter was named one of the Top 10 Sports Books of 2012 by Booklist, a Best Book of the Month by Amazon and lauded in reviews by Publishers Weekly and the Wall Street Journal.

In her first book, Food Heroes, Pellegrini tells the story of 16 food artisans around the world who are fighting to preserve their traditions. Food Heroes was nominated for an IACP award for best culinary writing with recipes.

=== Adventure Getaways ===
Pellegrini is the creator of Adventure Getaways, where she leads women on trips that feature a variety of rugged outdoor activities. The Getaways were described in a 2013 New York Times "T" Magazine article.

=== Other work ===
Pellegrini's website and blog chronicle her adventures, provide tutorials on "pioneer skills", and feature profiles of the artisans she meets in her travels. Her site was nominated for a 2010 Bloggie Award.

In September 2011, Pellegrini was the second woman ever to appear on the cover of Shooting Sportsman Magazine. Pellegrini also earned a spot on Forbes' list of top female entrepreneurs in 2012.

In December 2011, a Girl Hunter trailer was released in which Pellegrini talks about her food philosophy as a chef and hunter.

Pellegrini had been interviewed on the Today Show with Matt Lauer and on Jimmy Kimmel Live!
