= Sweet Bobby: My Catfish Nightmare =

2024 documentary film

- Promotional poster
- Directed by: Lyttanya Shannon
- Written by: Lyttanya Shannon
- Based on: Sweet Bobby by Tortoise Media
- Produced by: Rebecca North, Kiran Sira
- Starring: Kirat Assi, Bobby Jandu, Sanj Jandu, Hemma Gulhane
- Cinematography: Geoffrey Sentamu
- Edited by: Nic Zimmermann
- Music by: Roshan Gunga
- Production company: Raw TV
- Distributed by: Netflix
- Release date: 16 October 2024
- Running time: 82 minutes
- Country: United Kingdom
- Language: English

Sweet Bobby: My Catfish Nightmare is a British true crime documentary film directed by Lyttanya Shannon and released to streaming on Netflix on 16 October 2024. The documentary is based on the 2021 Tortoise Media podcast of the same name, which tells the story of Kirat Assi, a woman who was deceived by someone posing as a fictitious romantic partner named "Bobby Jandu" in an intricate catfishing scheme.

== Background ==
Sweet Bobby delves into the true story of British radio presenter Kirat Assi, who was catfished for nearly ten years by her own (female) cousin, Simran Bhogal, posing as "Bobby," a fictitious romantic (male) partner. It explores the emotional and psychological manipulation Assi endured, as well as the cultural and family pressures that impacted her experience. Through Kirat's retelling, Sweet Bobby examines themes of deception, emotional manipulation and online relationships.

== Aftermath ==
=== Simran Bhogal ===
After an unsuccessful police investigation, Assi successfully pursued a civil action against Bhogal in 2020, after which Bhogal privately apologised and Assi received a payout. Assi has since re-opened the police case.

It was reported that Simran Bhogal, a former vice president at Barclays bank, left her position in 2021. The Daily Mail reported in 2023 that she still lives with her parents in North West London.

In a statement released to Netflix, Bhogal said that "she considers it a private matter and strongly objects to what she describes as numerous unfounded and damaging accusations."

=== Bobby Jandu ===
The genuine Bobby Jandu is a dental surgeon who lives with his wife Sanj in Brighton.

=== Kirat Assi ===
Assi has taken a firm stance against revenge or public attacks on her cousin and her family. In interviews following Sweet Bobby, Kirat emphasized that her goal is accountability, not retribution.

Assi has discouraged any harassment toward Simran's relatives, acknowledging that they had also been affected by the fallout from the documentary. Assi advocates for justice reform, hoping her experience will push for stronger protections and legal consequences for catfishing and similar deceptive acts.

== See also ==
- The Tinder Swindler
