= Black Barbie: A Documentary =

- Film poster
- Directed by: Lagueria Davis
- Written by: Lagueria Davis
- Produced by: Lagueria Davis; Aaliyah Williams
- Starring: Lagueria Davis
- Cinematography: Rita Baghdadi; Sara Garth
- Edited by: Heidi Zimmerman
- Music by: Dara Taylor
- Production companies: Just A Rebel; Lady & Bird Films; LinLay Productions; Shondaland
- Distributed by: Netflix
- Release dates: September 2023 (SXSW); June 19, 2024
- Running time: 94 minutes
- Country: United States
- Language: English

Black Barbie: A Documentary is a 2023 American documentary film about the creation of the first black Barbie doll in 1980. The film is directed, written, and produced by Lagueria Davis. The film premiered at the 2023 South by Southwest film festival and was released on Netflix on June 19, 2024.

== Reception ==
On the review aggregator website Rotten Tomatoes, 96% of 27 critics' reviews are positive, with an average rating of 7.2/10. The website's consensus reads: "It took 20 years for a Black Barbie doll to appear next to white ones on shelves; this inspiring and insightful documentary spotlights the women who persisted to make this possible."

Richard Roeper of the Chicago Sun-Times gave the film three out of four stars and wrote, "Davis deftly weaves together archival footage with informative graphics, clever use of Barbie dolls to illustrate certain points in anthropomorphic fashion, and interviews with historians, public figures and three Black women who were instrumental figures at Mattel and who are the heart and soul of this story."

In 2025, Black Barbie won Daytime Emmy Awards for Outstanding Arts and Popular Culture Program and Outstanding Writing Team for a Daytime Non-Fiction Program.

== See also ==
- Kitty Black Perkins, designer of the first black Barbie doll, featured in the documentary
- Bill Greening, designer of the 40th and 45 anniversary black Barbie dolls, featured in the documentary
