= 45th Daytime Creative Arts Emmy Awards =

- Awarded for: Outstanding achievement in all fields of daytime television
- Date: April 27, 2018
- Location: Pasadena Civic Auditorium; Pasadena, Los Angeles, California, U.S.
- Presented by: National Academy of Television Arts and Sciences
- Website: emmyonline.org

The 45th Daytime Creative Arts Emmy Awards ceremony, which honors the crafts behind American daytime television programming, were held at the Pasadena Civic Auditorium in Pasadena, California on April 27, 2018. The event was presented in conjunction with the 45th Daytime Emmy Awards by the National Academy of Television Arts and Sciences. The nominations were announced on March 21, 2018, during a live episode of CBS's The Talk.

Two new categories for digital drama series—Outstanding Writing in a Digital Drama Series and Outstanding Directing in a Digital Drama Series—were added this year. The Outstanding Guest Performer in a Digital Daytime Drama Series category was also split out from the Supporting Actress and Supporting Actor categories for digital drama series.

== Winners and nominees ==
Winners are listed first, highlighted in boldface.

=== Performers ===
Category	Nominees
Outstanding Lead Actress in a Digital Daytime Drama Series	**Anne Winters as Mia Phillips on Zac & Mia (Verizon go90)**; Mary Beth Evans as Sara Garrett on The Bay The Series (Tubi); Vanessa Kelly as Journee on Giants (YouTube); Lilly Melgar as Janice Ramos on The Bay The Series (Tubi); Alicia Minshew as Angelica Caruso on Tainted Dreams (Amazon)
Outstanding Lead Actor in a Digital Daytime Drama Series	**Kristos Andrews as Peter Garrett on The Bay The Series (Tubi)**; James Bland as Malachi on Giants (YouTube); Richard Brooks as Augustus Barringer on The Rich and the Ruthless (UMC); Van Hansis as Thom on EastSiders (Netflix); Kian Lawley as Zac Meier on Zac & Mia (Verizon go90)
Outstanding Supporting Actress in a Digital Daytime Drama Series	**Jade Harlow as Lianna Ramos on The Bay The Series (Tubi)**; Molly Burnett as Laura on Relationship Status (Verizon go90); Terri Ivens as Orchid on The Bay The Series (Tubi); Kira Reed as Jo Connors on The Bay The Series (Tubi); Alexis G. Zall as Bec on Zac & Mia (Verizon go90)
Outstanding Supporting Actor in a Digital Daytime Drama Series	**Eric Nelsen as Daniel Garrett on The Bay The Series (Tubi)**; Brandon Beemer as Evan Blackwell on The Bay The Series (Tubi); Stephen Guarino as Quincy on EastSiders (Netflix); John Halbach as Ian on EastSiders (Netflix); Derrell Whitt as Will Campbell on The Bay The Series (Tubi)
Outstanding Guest Performer in a Digital Daytime Drama Series	**No award** (Note: Patrika Darbo initially won in this category for her performance as Mickey Walker on Amazon's The Bay The Series. The award was revoked and vacated after it was determined that Darbo appeared in a prior season of The Bay and entered scenes from multiple episodes for judging, both violations of the TV Academy's submission guidelines. An award was not given to runner-up Jennifer Bassey, portraying Beverly Newman on YouTube series Anacostia, because she too submitted scenes from multiple episodes. Thomas Calabro, nominated for his role as Arthur Tobin on The Bay, also had his nomination in this category rescinded for appearing in a prior season.); Patrika Darbo as Mickey Walker on The Bay The Series (Tubi) (disqualified); Jennifer Bassey as Beverly Newman on Anacostia (YouTube); Thomas Calabro as Arthur Tobin on The Bay The Series (Tubi) (disqualified); Chad Duell as Adam Kenway on The Bay The Series (Tubi); Mike E. Winfield as Jeremy on Conversations in L. A. (conversationsinla.com)

=== Crafts ===
Category	Nominees
Outstanding Writing in a Digital Drama Series	**Zac & Mia (Verizon go90)**; The Bay: The Series (Tubi); Conversations in L. A. (conversationsinla.com); EastSiders (Netflix); Relationship Status (Verizon go90)
Outstanding Directing in a Digital Drama Series	**The Bay: The Series (Tubi)**; EastSiders (Netflix); Relationship Status (Verizon go90); Venice: The Series (venicetheseries.com); Zac & Mia (Verizon go90)
Outstanding Directing in an Animated Program	**Danger & Eggs – Mike Owens, Brian Sheesley, Vincent Proce, Drew Schmidt, Sarah Seember Huisken, Shadi Petosky and Sam Riegel (Amazon)**; Disney Mickey Mouse - Alonso Ramirez-Ramos (Disney Channel); The Loud House - Kyle Marshall and Lisa Schaffer (Nickelodeon); The Mr. Peabody & Sherman Show: Season 4 - Mike Bell, Greg Miller, John Sanford, Dave Smith (Netflix); Niko and the Sword of Light: Season 1 - Sung Jin Ahn, Michael Moloney and Andrea Romano (Amazon)
