= Tainted Dreams =

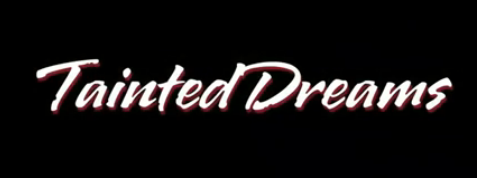
- Created by: Sonia Blangiardo
- Written by: Lindsay Harrison
- Starring: Alicia Minshew; Grant Aleksander; Kelley Menighan Hensley
- Country of origin: United States
- Original language: English
- No. of seasons: 2
- No. of episodes: 13

Production
- Executive producer: Sonia Blangiardo
- Producers: Mark Costello (consulting); Rob Santeramo (consulting); Candy Straight (consulting); Robert Levinstein (coordinating); Teresa Cicala
- Production company: NYC Brand Productions

Original release
- Network: YouTube
- Release: December 30, 2013 – December 28, 2017

Tainted Dreams is a soap opera that premiered on YouTube on December 30, 2013 and later moved exclusively to Amazon and Amazon Prime. The series debuted on Popstar! TV and the Popstar! App on September 23, 2019. Created by Sonia Blangiardo, it is a "soap-within-a-soap" which follows the backstage drama of the fictional soap opera Painted Dreams.

Tainted Dreams was nominated for a Daytime Emmy Award for Outstanding New Approaches Drama Series in 2014, and one for Outstanding Digital Daytime Drama Series in 2017. Kelley Menighan Hensley, Michael Lowry, Natalia Livingston, and Anthony Wilkinson were also nominated for Daytime Emmys in 2017 for their performances.

== Cast ==
- Alicia Minshew as Angelica Caruso
- Michael Lowry as Jordan Bradford
- Walt Willey as Gregory Ashford
- Kelley Menighan Hensley as Veronica Ashford
- Terri Ivens as Kassandra Bently
- Austin Peck as Max Hillstone
- Grant Aleksander as Adam Clark
- Natalia Livingston as Liza Park
- Ilene Kristen as Vivian Park
- Jessie Godderz as Dylan Buckwald
- Bobbie Eakes as Courtney Parish
- James DePaiva as Eddy Parish
- Marnie Schulenburg as Peyton Adams
- Anthony J. Wilkinson as Anthony DiGiacomo
- Dina Cantin as Alessandra DiGiacomo
- Colleen Zenk as Sofia DiGiacomo
- Nathan Purdee as Ethan Washington
- Larkin Malloy as Henry Steinman
- Tonja Walker as Tina Scott
- Lisa Marie Varon as Carla Santiago
- Carolyn Hinsey as herself

== Production and broadcast ==
Blangiardo created Tainted Dreams after the cancellation of the long running daytime soap opera One Life to Live, where she was a producer. She said in 2013, "I was struck by the loss of this unique art form that had been such an integral part of NYC for decades. I wanted to somehow capture my own two decades working behind the scenes of three different NYC-based soaps."

First cast were Minshew, Lowry, Willey, Hensley and Schulenburg. In January 2013, Cantin of Bravo's The Real Housewives of New Jersey was cast as Alessandra DiGiacomo, a role written with her in mind. Later cast additions in 2013 included Peck, Zenk, Aleksander, Livingston, Malloy, Eakes, and DePaiva, Kristen and Walker.

The first three episodes of Tainted Dreams were released on YouTube on December 30, 2013.

Tainted Dreams was licensed to Amazon.com for streaming through its Amazon Prime service starting December 26, 2016.

The series debuted on Popstar! TV and the Popstar! App on September 23, 2019.

== Reception and awards ==
Writing for Entertainment Weekly, Alina Adams named the series one of the "4 best soap operas on the web" in 2015.

Year	Award	Category	Nominee(s)	Result	Ref.
2014	41st Daytime Emmy Awards	Outstanding New Approaches Drama Series	Executive Producer: Sonia Blangiardo; Consulting Producers: Mark Costello, Rob Santeramo, Candy Straight; Coordinating Producer: Robert Levinstein; Producer: Teresa Cicala	Nominated	
2014	5th Indie Series Awards	Best Ensemble (Drama)		Nominated	
2014	5th Indie Series Awards	Best Lead Actress (Drama)	Alicia Minshew	Nominated	
2017	44th Daytime Creative Arts Emmy Awards	Outstanding Digital Daytime Drama Series	Executive Producer: Sonia Blangiardo; Story Producer: Brandon Goins; Consulting Producers: Mark Costello, Rob Santeramo, Candy Straight; Senior Producer: Teresa Cicala; Coordinating Producer: Robert Levinstein	Nominated	
2017	44th Daytime Creative Arts Emmy Awards	Outstanding Lead Actress in a Digital Daytime Drama Series	Kelley Menighan Hensley as Veronica Ashford	Nominated	
2017	44th Daytime Creative Arts Emmy Awards	Outstanding Lead Actor in a Digital Daytime Drama Series	Michael Lowry as Jordan Bradford	Nominated	
2017	44th Daytime Creative Arts Emmy Awards	Outstanding Supporting or Guest Actress in a Digital Daytime Drama Series	Natalia Livingston as Liza Park	Nominated	
2017	44th Daytime Creative Arts Emmy Awards	Outstanding Supporting or Guest Actor in a Digital Daytime Drama Series	Anthony Wilkinson as Anthony DiGiacomo	Nominated	
2018	45th Daytime Creative Arts Emmy Awards	Outstanding Digital Daytime Drama Series		Nominated	
2018	45th Daytime Creative Arts Emmy Awards	Outstanding Lead Actress in a Digital Daytime Drama Series	Alicia Minshew as Angelica Caruso	Nominated	
