= 43rd Daytime Creative Arts Emmy Awards =

- Awarded for: Outstanding achievement in all fields of daytime television
- Date: April 29, 2016
- Location: Westin Bonaventure Hotel and Suites in Los Angeles, California, U.S.
- Presented by: National Academy of Television Arts and Sciences

Highlights
- Most awards: The Mind of a Chef (5); The Young and the Restless (5)
- Most nominations: The Young and the Restless (27)
- Website: emmyonline.org

The 43rd Daytime Creative Arts Emmy Awards ceremony, which honors the crafts behind American daytime television programming, was held at the Westin Bonaventure Hotel and Suites in Los Angeles on April 29, 2016. The event was presented in conjunction with the 43rd Daytime Emmy Awards by the National Academy of Television Arts and Sciences. The nominations were announced on March 24, 2016, and neither ceremony was televised.

== Category and rule changes ==
The academy announced some category and rule changes for the 43rd Daytime Emmy Awards, which include:

- The category New Approaches Drama Series was renamed Outstanding Digital Daytime Drama Series.
- The previous single acting category for this program type was divided into two categories, and renamed Outstanding Actress in a Digital Daytime Drama Series and Outstanding Actor in a Digital Daytime Drama Series. A performer in either a lead or supporting role was eligible to enter.
- The academy introduced a new category, Outstanding Musical Performance in a Talk Show/Morning Program. A musical artist and the program's production of the performance were eligible to enter for performances which occurred during the 2015 calendar year.

== Winners and nominees ==
In the lists below, the winner of the category is in bold.

=== Programs ===
Category	Winners and nominees
Outstanding Digital Daytime Drama Series	**The Bay: The Series (Vimeo)**; East Los High (Hulu); EastSiders (Vimeo); Vanity (YouTube); Winterthorne (winterthorne.com)
Outstanding Culinary Program	**Patricia Heaton Parties (Food Network)**; America's Test Kitchen (PBS); Cook's Country (PBS); Giada in Italy (Food Network); Mexico One Plate at a Time with Rick Bayless (PBS); Pati's Mexican Table (PBS)
Outstanding Pre-School Children's Series	**Sesame Street (PBS)**; Dino Dan: Trek's Adventures (Nickelodeon); Mutt & Stuff (Nickelodeon); Sunny Side Up (Sprout); Yo Gabba Gabba! (Nickelodeon)
Outstanding Children's Series	**Sea Rescue (ABC)**; Annedroids (Amazon); Odd Squad (PBS); Project MC² (Netflix); The Wildlife Docs (SYN)
Outstanding Pre-School Children's Animated Program	**Tumble Leaf (Amazon)**; Dinosaur Train (PBS); Henry Hugglemonster (Disney Junior); Peg + Cat (PBS); Wallykazam! (Nickelodeon)
Outstanding Children's Animated Program	**Niko and the Sword of Light (Amazon)**; All Hail King Julien (Netflix); Dragons: Race to the Edge (Netflix); The Mr. Peabody & Sherman Show (Netflix); WordGirl (PBS)
Outstanding Special Class Animated Program	**Peter Rabbit (Nickelodeon)**; Miles From Tomorrowland (Disney Junior); Transformers: Robots in Disguise (Cartoon Network)
Outstanding Legal/Courtroom Program	**Judge Judy**; Divorce Court; Hot Bench; The People's Court; Paternity Court
Outstanding Lifestyle Program	**This Old House (PBS)**; Ask This Old House (PBS); Build Small, Live Anywhere (HGTV); Home Made Simple (OWN); Rough Cut (PBS)
Outstanding Travel and Adventure Program	**Jack Hanna's Into the Wild**; 1st Look (NBC); Born to Explore with Richard Wiese (SYNDICATED); Ocean Mysteries with Jeff Corwin (SYNDICATED); Rock the Park (SYNDICATED)
Outstanding Special Class Series	**Lucky Dog** (CBS); Crime Watch Daily (SYNDICATED); The Henry Ford's Innovation Nation (CBS); SuperSoul Sunday (OWN); Xploration Earth 2050 (FOX)
Outstanding Special Class Special	**Matt Shepard is a Friend of Mine** (Logo); 30th Independent Spirit Awards (IFC); Barefoot in L.A. (Food Network); R.L. Stine's Monsterville: Cabinet of Souls (Netflix); White People (MTV)
Outstanding Special Class - Short Format Daytime Program	**SuperSoul Shorts (OWN)**; JetBlue HumanKinda (YouTube.com); MALALA FUND (PIVOT); Oh Noah! (PBS); The New York Times Op-Docs: Animated Life (The New York Times); Videos 4 U: I Love You (This American Life)
Outstanding Interactive Media – Enhancement to a Daytime Program or Series	**The Ellen DeGeneres Show**; Nickelodeon HALO Awards Walk the Moon 360 Experience (Nickelodeon); Odd Squad (PBS); Ruff-Ruff, Tweet and Dave: Companion App (Sprout)
Outstanding Interactive Media - Original Daytime Program or Series	**Inside the Box of Kurios (felixandpaul.com)**; Design Squad (PBS); Inside Impact: East Africa (www.insideimpactvr.com / Facebook Mobile); Mission US (www.mission- us.org/THIRTEEN WNET); Sesame and Autism: See Amazing in All Children! (PBS)
Outstanding Promotional Announcement – Topical	**Today: "Rokerthon 2" (NBC)**; Dr. Phil: The Co-Eds and the Catfish (SYNDICATED); General Hospital: GH is Live (ABC); Today Show: Halloween on TODAY (NBC); The Young and the Restless
Outstanding Promotional Announcement – Image	**The Ellen DeGeneres Show: "Today's The Day"**; Earth's Natural Wonders (PBS); PBS 2015 Preview Campaign - "Drama", "Science", "History" (PBS); PBS Brand Touchstone (PBS); Vicious: Vicious NYC Pride March 2015 (PBS)

=== Performers ===
Category	Winners and nominees
Outstanding Actress in a Digital Daytime Drama Series	**Mary Beth Evans as Sara Garrett on The Bay The Series** (Vimeo); Kathleen Gati, as Valentina Winterthorne on Winterthorne (winterthorne.com); Elizabeth Hubbard as Eva Montgomery on Anacostia (YouTube); Lilly Melgar as Janice Ramos on The Bay The Series (Vimeo); Patsy Pease as Lola Baker on The Bay The Series (Vimeo)
Outstanding Actor in a Digital Daytime Drama Series	**Kristos Andrews as Pete Garrett on The Bay The Series** (Vimeo); Van Hansis as Thom on EastSiders (Vimeo); Rick Hearst as Mr. Ryan on Youthful Daze (youthfuldaze.com); J. D. Pardo as Jesús on East Los High (Hulu); Kevin Spirtas as Dominic Delacort on Winterthorne (winterthorne.com)
Outstanding Performer in a Children's or Pre-School Children's Series	
Outstanding Performer in an Animated Program	
Outstanding Culinary Host	
Outstanding Lifestyle/Travel/Children's Series Host	Jenna Bush Hager on Give; Emily Calandrelli on Xploration Outer Space; Rocky Kanaka on Save Our Shelter; Joseph Rosendo on Travelscope; Danny Seo on Naturally, Danny Seo

=== Crafts ===
Category	Winners and nominees
Outstanding Casting Director for a Drama Series	
Outstanding Art Direction/Set Decoration/Scenic Design for a Drama Series	
Outstanding Lighting Direction for a Drama Series	
Outstanding Technical Team for a Drama Series	
Outstanding Multiple Camera Editing for a Drama Series	
Outstanding Live and Direct to Tape Sound Mixing for a Drama Series	
Outstanding Music Direction and Composition for a Drama Series	
Outstanding Original Song – Drama	
Outstanding Costume Design for a Drama Series	
Outstanding Hairstyling for a Drama Series	
Outstanding Makeup for a Drama Series	
Outstanding Casting for an Animated Series or Special	**Ania Kamieniecki-O'Hare (The Adventures of Puss in Boots)**; Michelle Levitt, Sarah Noonan, Shannon Reed and Gene Vassilaros (Blaze and the Monster Machines); Brian Mathias (Sofia the First); Christi Soper and Ania Kamieniecki-O'Hare (Dragons: Race to the Edge); Meredith Layne, Sarah Noonan and Gene Vassilaros (Teenage Mutant Ninja Turtles)
Outstanding Individual Achievement in Animation	
Outstanding Writing in a Pre-School Animated Program	**Billy Lopez, Billy Aronson, David Steven Cohen, Kevin Del Aguila, Dustin Ferrer, Qui Nguyen and Jennifer Oxley (Peg + Cat)**; Becky Friedman, Jill Cozza-Turner, Leah Gotcsik, Jennifer Hamburg, Angela Santomero (Daniel Tiger's Neighborhood); Chris Nee, Kent Redeker, Chelsea Beyl and Kerri Grant (Doc McStuffins); Andrew Guerdat, Steven Sullivan, Holly Huckins and Krista Tucker (Sheriff Callie's Wild West); Adam Peltzman, James Nolan and Scott Gray (Wallykazam!)
Outstanding Writing in an Animated Program	**Mitch Watson, Michael Ryan, Sharon Flynn and Elliott Owen (All Hail King Julien)**; Art Edler Brown and Douglas Sloan (Dragons: Race to the Edge); Adam Rudman and David Rudman (Nature Cat); Nicole Dubuc, Brian Hohlfeld, Greg Johnson, Cydne Clark, Steve Granat and Andrew Robinson (Transformers: Rescue Bots); Chris Kratt and Martin Kratt (Wild Kratts)
Outstanding Writing in a Children's or Pre-School Children's Series	**Timothy McKeon, Charles Johnston and Mark De Angelis (Odd Squad)**
Outstanding Writing Special Class	**Jim Lichtenstein, Stephanie Himango and John Murphy (The Henry Ford's Innovation Nation)**
Outstanding Directing in an Animated Program	**Drew Hodges (Tumble Leaf)**; Stephen Heneveld, Christo Stamboliev, James Wootton and Collette Sunderman (All Hail King Julien); Cory Bobiak, Jennifer Oxley, Brett Hall, Robert Powers, Christopher Jammal, Susan Hart and Steven Rebollido (Peg + Cat); David McCamley, Maurizio Parimbelli and Dino Athanassiou (Peter Rabbit); Mike Bell (director), Greg Miller and John Sanford (The Mr. Peabody & Sherman Show)
Outstanding Directing in a Children's or Pre-School Children's Series	**J.J. Johnson, Stephen Reynolds, Brian K. Roberts, Stefan Scaini and Craig David Wallace (Odd Squad)**
Outstanding Directing in a Lifestyle/Culinary/Travel Program	**Anna Chai and Siobhan Walshe (The Mind of a Chef)**
Outstanding Directing in a Talk Show/Entertainment News/Morning Program	
Outstanding Directing in a Game Show	**Kevin McCarthy, Jeopardy!**; Ken Fuchs, Family Feud; Dana Calderwood, Idiotest; Robert Ennis Jr., Wheel of Fortune; Rich DiPirro, Who Wants to Be a Millionaire
Outstanding Directing Special Class	
Outstanding Art Direction/Set Decoration/Scenic Design	**Brian Kane, Peter Bodnarus and Terry Joseph (R.L. Stine's Monsterville: Cabinet of Souls)**
Outstanding Main Title and Graphic Design	**Daniel de Graaf, Adam Lupsha and Michael Houston (The Mind of a Chef)**
Outstanding Lighting Direction	
Outstanding Technical Team	
Outstanding Cinematography	**Jeremy Leach, Frederic Menou and Ethan Mills (The Mind of a Chef)**
Outstanding Single Camera Editing	
Outstanding Multiple Camera Editing	
Outstanding Live and Direct to Tape Sound Mixing	**Cristian Kaestner, Paul Koemans, Dino Suceska, Damien Quintard, Richard Sharrat, Scott Willsallen and Andy Rose (Baku 2015 European Games Opening Ceremony)**; Don Worsham, Jorge Vivo and Mike Greenberg (Disney Parks Unforgettable Christmas Celebration); Jorge Silva, Derek Vintschger (The Dr. Oz Show); Phillip Gephardt, Dirk Sciarrotta and Terry Fountain (The Ellen DeGeneres Show); Ed Greene, Henry Muehlhausen, Jennifer M. Fah, Nicole Katz, Frankie Le Nguyen, La-Aja Hernandez, Nancy Perry and Brian Rushing (The Price Is Right)
Outstanding Sound Mixing – Live Action	**Chris Prinzivalli, Michael Barrett, Michael Croiter and Dick Maitland (Sesame Street)**; Sean W. Karp, John Bradshaw, Blag Ahilov, Charles Duchesne, William Preventis and Noah Siegel (Annedroids); Hunt Beaty, Cory Choy and Robin Shore (Born to Explore with Richard Wiese); Asif Ali, David Malits, Mike Snow and Eric Valdes (Game Changers); Asif Ali, Frank Biondo, Mike Gouldy, Joel Kraus, Josh McRae and Roger Smith (The Henry Ford's Innovation Nation)
Outstanding Sound Mixing – Animation	**Justin Brinsfield, Matt Corey, Manny Grijalva, D.J. Lynch, Jeff Shiffman (Teenage Mutant Ninja Turtles)**; Devon Bowman, Vicki Lemar, Aran Tanchum, Ian Nyeste and D.J. Lynch (All Hail King Julien); Devon Bowman, D.J. Lynch, Rob McIntyre and Aran Tanchum (Dinotrux); Carlos Sanches and Otis Van Osten (Dragons: Race to the Edge); Carlos Sanches and Otis Van Osten (Miles from Tomorrowland)
Outstanding Sound Editing – Live Action	**Michael Barrett, Chris Prinzivalli, Michael Croiter, Jorge Muelle, Paul Rudolph, Chris Sassano and Dick Maitland (Sesame Street)**; Blag Ahilov, Charles Duchesne, William Preventis, Noah Siegel, Sean W. Karp and Jakob Thiesen (Annedroids); Jason Grigg (Travelscope); John Douglas Smith, Jason MacNeill, Bill Turchinetz, David Yonson and Virginia Storey (Odd Squad); Evan Frankfort (The Inspectors)
Outstanding Sound Editing – Animation	**Otis Van Osten, Joshua Aaron Johnson, Roger Pallan and Jason Oliver (Dragons: Race to the Edge)**; Devon Bowman, Chris Gresham, Andrew Ing, D.J. Lynch, Peter Munters, Lawrence Reyes, Ian Nyeste, Mishelle Fordham, Aran Tanchum and Vincent Guisetti (All Hail King Julien); Devon Bowman, Vincent Guisetti, Rob McIntyre, Shawn Bohonos, Jessey Drake, Andrew Ing, Marc Schmidt and Aran Tanchum (Dinotrux); Jeff Shiffman, Jessey Drake, Brad Meyer, Eric Paulsen, Anna Adams, Elliot Herman and Roger Pallan (Half-Shell Heroes: Blast to the Past); Jeff Shiffman, Jessey Drake, Anna Adams, Elliot Herman and Roger Pallan (Teenage Mutant Ninja Turtles)
Outstanding Music Direction and Composition	**Steven Rebollido, J. Walter Hawkes, Martin Erskine and D.D. Jackson (Peg + Cat)**
Outstanding Original Song	**Frederik Wiedmann and Mitch Watson (All Hail King Julien: True Bromance - Bromance)**
Outstanding Musical Performance in a Talk Show/Morning Program	**Rachel Platten (Good Morning America)**
Outstanding Costume Design/Styling	**Christine Toye (Odd Squad)**
Outstanding Hairstyling	**Patricia Cuthbert (Odd Squad)**
Outstanding Makeup	**Debi Lelievre, Todd Masters, Mike Fields, Felix Fox, Holland Miller, Chris Devitt, Harlow MacFarlane, Yukiyo Okajima, Sarah Pickersgill, Brad Proctor, Lori Sandnes, Tomasz Sosnowski and Jason Ward (R.L. Stine's Monsterville: Cabinet of Souls)**
Outstanding Stunt Coordination	

=== Lifetime Achievement Award ===
- Frank Welker
