= 44th Daytime Creative Arts Emmy Awards =

- Awarded for: Outstanding achievement in all fields of daytime television
- Date: April 28, 2017
- Location: Pasadena Civic Auditorium; Pasadena, Los Angeles, California, U.S.
- Presented by: National Academy of Television Arts and Sciences
- Preshow host: Carolyn Hennesy

Highlights
- Most awards: Trollhunters (6)
- Website: emmyonline.org

The 44th Daytime Creative Arts Emmy Awards ceremony, which honors the crafts behind American daytime television programming, was held at the Pasadena Civic Auditorium in Pasadena, California on April 28, 2017. The event was presented in conjunction with the 44th Daytime Emmy Awards by the National Academy of Television Arts and Sciences. The nominations were announced on March 22, 2017, during a live episode of CBS's The Talk for the third year in a row. On January 26, 2017, it was announced that the Lifetime Achievement Award would be presented to Harry Friedman.

== Category and rule changes ==
The National Academy of Television Arts and Sciences announced and implemented some category and rule changes for the 44th Daytime Emmy Awards, which include:

- The previous two performer categories related to Outstanding Digital Daytime Drama Series were replaced by four categories:
  - Outstanding Lead Actress in a Digital Daytime Drama Series
  - Outstanding Lead Actor in a Digital Daytime Drama Series
  - Outstanding Supporting or Guest Actress in a Digital Daytime Drama Series
  - Outstanding Supporting or Guest Actor in a Digital Daytime Drama Series
- New categories were added to recognize work on Preschool Animated Programs:
  - Outstanding Directing in a Preschool Animated Program
  - Outstanding Sound Mixing for a Preschool Animated Program
  - Outstanding Sound Editing for a Preschool Animated Program
- The category Outstanding Musical Performance in a Talk Show/Morning Program was renamed Outstanding Musical Performance in a Daytime Program, now honoring any Daytime Program, not just talk shows or morning programs.
- The category Outstanding Children's Series was renamed Outstanding Children's and Family Viewing Series.
- Directors in the category of Outstanding Directing in a Talk Show/Entertainment News or Morning Program now have the ability to select up to 5 episodes from the 2016 calendar year, that has a total running time of 40 minutes to submit for evaluation.

== Winners and nominees ==
Winners are listed first, highlighted in boldface, and indicated with a double dagger (‡).

=== Programs ===
Category	Winners and nominees
Outstanding Culinary Program	**Eat the World with Emeril Lagasse (Amazon)** ‡; America's Test Kitchen (PBS); Barefoot Contessa: Back to Basics (Food Network); Guy's Big Bite (Food Network); The Mind of a Chef (PBS); Trisha's Southern Kitchen (Food Network)
Outstanding Digital Daytime Drama Series	**The Bay: The Series (Vimeo)** ‡; Red Bird (Amazon); Tainted Dreams (Amazon); Tough Love (YouTube); Venice: The Series (venicetheseries.com)
Outstanding Pre-School Children's Series	**Sesame Street (HBO)** ‡; Bookaboo (Amazon); Dino Dan: Trek's Adventures (Nickelodeon); Mutt & Stuff (Nickelodeon); Sunny Side Up (Sprout)
Outstanding Children's or Family Viewing Series	**Give (NBC)** ‡; Annedroids (Amazon); Odd Squad (PBS); This Just In (Pop TV); Xploration DIY Sci (Syndicated)
Outstanding Pre-School Children's Animated Program	**The Snowy Day (Amazon)** ‡; Ask the StoryBots (Netflix); Peg + Cat (PBS); Tumble Leaf (Amazon); Wallykazam! (Nickelodeon)
Outstanding Children's Animated Program	**Lost in Oz: Extended Adventure (Amazon)** ‡; Milo Murphy's Law (Disney Channel); Dragons: Race to the Edge (Netflix); Lego Star Wars: The Freemaker Adventures (Disney XD); The Mr. Peabody & Sherman Show (Netflix)
Outstanding Special Class Animated Program	**Taking Flight (takingflightfilm.com)** ‡; The Boy Who Learned To Fly (YouTube); A Love Story (YouTube); Octonauts (Disney Junior); Trollhunters (Netflix)
Outstanding Legal/Courtroom Program	**Judge Judy (Syndicated)** ‡; The People's Court (Syndicated); Lauren Lake's Paternity Court (Syndicated); Hot Bench (Syndicated); Judge Mathis (Syndicated)
Outstanding Lifestyle Program	**Flea Market Flip (HGTV)** ‡; George to the Rescue (NBC); Home Made Simple (OWN); Lake Life (DIY); Open House (NBC)
Outstanding Travel and Adventure Program	**Wonder Women (Feeln)** ‡; Jonathan Bird's Blue World (YouTube); Joseph Rosendo's Travelscope (PBS); Planet Primetime (Travel Channel); Xploration Awesome Planet (Syndicated)
Outstanding Morning Program in Spanish	**Un Nuevo Dia (Telemundo) ‡**; Café CNN (CNN en Español); ¡Despierta América! (Univision)
Outstanding Special Class Series	**Super Soul Sunday (OWN)** ‡; Close Up with The Hollywood Reporter (SundanceTV); Crime Watch Daily With Chris Hansen (Syndicated); Landscapes Through Time with David Dunlop (PBS); Working in the Theatre (American Theatre Wing)
Outstanding Special Class Special	**Out of Iraq (Logo TV)** ‡; MTV Docs: Transformation (MTV); Bookaboo New Years Eve Special (Amazon); The Wildlife Docs: Africa (ABC); The Disney Parks' Magical Christmas Celebration (ABC)
Outstanding Special Class – Short Format Daytime Program	**SuperSoul Shorts – Maggie the Cow (OWN)** ‡; Clarify (Spotify); Nature Boom Time (National Geographic); HealthiNation Films (HealthiNation); The American Dream Project (Netflix)
Outstanding Interactive Media – Enhancement to a Daytime Program or Series	**Ask the StoryBots – Companion App and StoryBots Classroom (Netflix)** ‡; Cyberchase: Save the Park! (PBS); The Dr. Oz Show (Syndicated); Nickelodeon's Ultimate Halloween Haunted House 360 Challenge (Nickelodeon); Odd Squad (PBS); Peg + Cat (PBS)
Outstanding Interactive Media – Original Daytime Content	**Invasion! (Invasion! (Oculus Rift, Gear VR, HTC Vive, Sony PSVR & Google Daydream** ‡; Daily Burn 365 (dailyburn.com); Design Squad (PBS); Mission US: The Presidents (Nickelodeon)
Outstanding Promotional Announcement – Topical	**Good Morning America: Mini-Michael Strahan (ABC)** ‡; Black America Since MLK: And Still I Rise (PBS); David Bowie: Five Years (PBS); 2016 Kids' Choice Awards (Nickelodeon); Today Show: Halloween on TODAY (NBC)
Outstanding Promotional Announcement – Image	**Black History Month: Timeless Heroes – Be Inspired (Disney XD)** ‡; Diversity Campaign (Disney Junior); Masterpice: Victoria (PBS); Sesame Studios: Launch Campaign (YouTube); Kids Pick the President 2016 (Nickelodeon)

=== Performers ===
Category	Winners and nominees
Outstanding Lead Actress in a Digital Daytime Drama Series	**Mary Beth Evans as Sara Garrett on The Bay The Series (Vimeo)** ‡; Anne Marie Cummings as Michelle Macabee on Conversations in L. A. (conversationsinla.com); Alexandra Goodman as Kitty Mae on Red Bird (Amazon.com); Lilly Melgar as Janice Ramos on The Bay The Series (Vimeo); Kelley Menighan Hensley as Veronica Ashford on Tainted Dreams (Amazon.com)
Outstanding Lead Actor in a Digital Daytime Drama Series	**Kristos Andrews as Peter Garrett/Young Jack Madison on The Bay The Series (Vimeo)** ‡; Anthony Anderson as Sean Williams-Grey on Anacostia (YouTube); Michael Lowry as Jordan Bradford on Tainted Dreams (Amazon.com); Michael McShane as Sam on Red Bird (Amazon.com); Gustavo Velasquez as Gus Borrero on Conversations in L. A. (conversationsinla.com)
Outstanding Supporting or Guest Actress in a Digital Daytime Drama Series	**Carolyn Hennesy as Karen Blackwell on The Bay The Series (Vimeo)** ‡; Jade Harlow as Lianna Ramos on The Bay The Series (Vimeo); Vanita Harbour as Nicole Hampstead on Conversations in L. A. (conversationsinla.com); Natalia Livingston as Liza Park on Tainted Dreams (Amazon.com); Kym Whitley as Big Candi on The Bay The Series (Vimeo)
Outstanding Supporting or Guest Actor in a Digital Daytime Drama Series	**Nicolas Coster as Mayor Jack Madison on The Bay The Series (Vimeo)** ‡; Matthew Ashford as Steven Jensen on The Bay The Series (Vimeo); Ronn Moss as John Blackwell on The Bay The Series (Vimeo); Armin Shimerman as Max on Red Bird (Amazon.com); Anthony Wilkinson as Anthony DiGiacomo on Tainted Dreams (Amazon.com)
Outstanding Performer in a Children's or Pre-School Children's Series	**Isaac Kargten as Otis on Odd Squad (PBS)** ‡; Adrianna Di Liello as Shania on Annedroids (Amazon); Ryan Dillon as Elmo on Sesame Street (HBO); Addison Holley as Anne on Annedroids (Amazon); Jack McBrayer as Weird Tom on Odd Squad (PBS)
Outstanding Performer in an Animated Program	**Kelsey Grammer as Blinky on Trollhunters (Netflix/DreamWorks Animation)** ‡; Danny Jacobs as King Julien, Pancho on All Hail King Julien (Netflix/Dreamworks Animation); Kate McKinnon as Squeeks on Nature Cat (PBS); Andy Richter as Mort, Smart Mort, Morticus Khan, Ted on All Hail King Julien (Netflix/Dreamworks Animation); Rick Zieff as Spike on The Tom & Jerry Show (WarnerBrothers.com)
Outstanding Culinary Host	**Ina Garten on Barefoot Contessa: Back to Basics (Food Network)** ‡; Rick Bayless on Mexico One Plate at a Time with Rick Bayless (PBS); Lidia Bastianich on Lidia's Kitchen (PBS); Guy Fieri on Guy's Big Bite (Food Network); Bobby Flay on Brunch @ Bobby's (Food Network); Vivian Howard on A Chef's Life (PBS)
Outstanding Lifestyle/Travel/Children's Series Host	**Joseph Rosendo on Joseph Rosendo's Travelscope (PBS)**; Jenna Bush Hager on Give (NBC); Emily Calandrelli on XPLORATION OUTER SPACE (Syndicated); Rocky Kanaka on Save Our Shelter (CW Television Network); Danny Seo on Naturally, Danny Seo (NBC)

=== Crafts ===
==== Drama ====
Category	Winners and nominees
Outstanding Casting for a Drama Series	**Marnie Saitta – Days of Our Lives (NBC)** ‡; Mark Teschner – General Hospital (ABC); Judy Blye Wilson – The Young and the Restless (CBS)
Outstanding Art Direction/Set Decoration/Scenic Design for a Drama Series	**David Hoffmann, Jennifer Savala, Fred Cooper, Jennifer Haybach and Jennifer Herwitt – The Young and the Restless (CBS)** ‡; Jack Forrestel, Fabrice Kenwood, Joe Bevacqua, Richard Domabyl and Charlotte Garnell – The Bold and the Beautiful (CBS); Dan Olexiewicz, Tom Early and Danielle Mullen – Days of Our Lives (NBC); Jennifer Elliott and Andrew Evashchen – General Hospital (ABC)
Outstanding Lighting Direction for a Drama Series	**William Roberts and Ray Thompson – The Young and the Restless (CBS)** ‡; Phil Callan and Patrick Cunniff – The Bold and the Beautiful (CBS); Ted Polmanski and Mark Levin – Days of Our Lives (NBC); Melanie Mohr and Vincent Steib – General Hospital (ABC)
Outstanding Drama Series Technical Team	**Gary Chamberlin, Jim Dray, John Carlson, Dean Lamont, Ted Morales, Roberto Bosio and Schae Jani – The Bold and the Beautiful (CBS)** ‡; Mike Caruso, Jay O'Neill, Steve Clark, Michael Denton, John Sizemore, Victoria Walker, Mark Warshaw and Alexis Hansen – Days of Our Lives (NBC); Chuck Abate, Kevin Carr, Craig Camou, Dale Carlson, Dean Cosanella, Barbara Langdon and Antonio Simone – General Hospital (ABC); Tracy Lawrence, John Bromberek, Luis Godinez Jr., Kai Kim, Robert Bosio and Scha Jani – The Young and the Restless (CBS)
Outstanding Multiple Camera Editing for a Drama Series	**Derek Berlatsky, Kimberly Everett, Rafael Gertel, Andrew Hachem, Tina Keller – The Young and the Restless (CBS)** ‡; Brian Bagwell, Marc Beruti, Marika Kushel, Anthony Pascarelli – The Bold and the Beautiful (CBS); Lugh Powers, Kevin Church, Michael Fiamingo, Christopher Lewis, Joseph Lumer, Jenée Muyeau, Samantha Stone – Days of Our Lives (NBC); Peter Fillmore, David Gonzalez, Marika Kushel, Christine Magarian Ucar, Allison Reames, Denise Van Cleave – General Hospital (ABC)
Outstanding Live and Direct to Tape Sound Mixing for a Drama Series	**Kevin Church, Michael Fiamingo, Chris Lewis, Joseph Lumar, Jenee Muyeau, Lugh Powers, Samantha Stone, Stu Rudolph, Harry Young, Roger Cortes – Days of Our Lives (NBC)** ‡; Brian Connell, Jerry Martz, Nick Krotov, Justin Lamont – The Bold and the Beautiful (CBS); Christopher Banninger, Donald Smith, Paul Glass, Dave MacLeod, Thomas Byrne, Alan Zema – General Hospital (ABC); Tommy Persson, Dean Johnson, Ricky Alvarez, Mark Mooney, Denise Palm Stones – The Young and the Restless (CBS)
Outstanding Music Direction and Composition for a Drama Series	**Paul E. Antonelli, Stephen Reinhardt, Kenneth R. Corday, D. Brent Nelson – Days of Our Lives (NBC)** ‡; Lothar Struff, Bradley P. Bell, John Nordstrom, Jack Allocco, David Kurtz – The Bold and the Beautiful (CBS); Paul S Glass, Dave MacLeod, Kurt Biederwolf, Stephen E Hopkins, Matt McGuire, Bobby Summerfield – General Hospital (ABC); Ron Cates, Paul Antonelli, Sharon Farber, Brad Hatfield, Gaye Tolan Hatfield, Rick Krizman, Dominic Messinger – The Young and the Restless (CBS)
Outstanding Original Song – Drama	**"When Time was on our Side" Genesee Nelson – Days of Our Lives (NBC)** ‡; "Standing With You" Jamey Jaz, Bradley P. Bell, Anthony Ferrari, Casey Kasprzyk – The Bold and the Beautiful (CBS); "These Are The Moments" Jamey Jazz, Bradley P. Bell, Reign Edwards, Anthony Ferrari, Casey Kasprzyk – The Bold and the Beautiful (CBS); "You Were Mine" Jamey Jaz, Bradley P. Bell, Anthony Ferrari, Casey Kasprzyk – The Bold and the Beautiful (CBS); "Skin On Skin" Bob Hartry, Daena Jay Wienand – The Young and the Restless (CBS)
Outstanding Costume Design for a Drama Series	**Glenda Maddox – The Bold and the Beautiful (CBS)** ‡; Richard Bloore – Days of Our Lives (NBC); Shawn Reeves – General Hospital (ABC); Scott Burkhart, Elif Inanc – The Young and the Restless (CBS)
Outstanding Hairstyling for a Drama Series	**Michele Arviz, Cora Diggins, Romaine Markus-Myers, Danielle Spencer – The Bold and the Beautiful (CBS)** ‡; Armando Licon, Daniela Martinez, Soo-Jin Yoon – Days of Our Lives (NBC); Gwen Huyen Tran, Adriana Lucio, John McCormick, Regina Rodriguez – The Young and the Restless (CBS)
Outstanding Makeup for a Drama Series	**Christine Lai-Johnson, Leilani Baker, Chris Escobosa, Joleen Rizzo, Jennifer Wittman – The Bold and the Beautiful (CBS)** ‡; Nick Shillace, Nathalie Allen, Karen Dahl, Deidre Decker, Nina Wells – Days of Our Lives (NBC); Donna Messina, Angele Ackley, Louisa Adzhiyan, Caitlin Davison, Bobbie Roberts – General Hospital (ABC); Patti Denney, Robert Bolger, Kathy Jones, Marlene Mason, Kelsey McGraw, Laura Schaffer – The Young and the Restless (CBS)

==== Non-Drama ====
Category	Winners and nominees
Outstanding Casting for an Animated Series or Special	**Mary Hidalgo, Ania O'Hare, CSA – Trollhunters (Netflix)** ‡; Shiondre Austin, Michelle Levitt, Danielle Pretsfelder, Nate Rogers, Gene Vassilaros, Leslie Zaslower – Bubble Guppies (Nickelodeon); Lindsay Halper – Lego Star Wars: The Freemaker Adventures (Disney XD); Susan Blu – Lost in Oz: Extended Adventure (Amazon); Jamie Simone – The Snowy Day (Amazon)
Outstanding Individual Achievement in Animation (WINNERS)	**Mike Chaffe, Animator – "Becoming, Part 1" – Trollhunters (Netflix)** ‡; **Kevin Dart, Art Director – "The Wrath Of Hughes" – The Mr. Peabody & Sherman Show (Netflix)** ‡; **Phil Jacobson, Storyboard Artist – "Mall Ya Later" – Pig Goat Banana Cricket (Nickelodeon)** ‡; **Victor Maldonado, Character Designer – "Win, Lose Or Draal" – Trollhunters Netflix** ‡; **Khang Le, Art Director – "What's The Trouble Bubble" – Little Big Awesome (Amazon)** ‡; **Eastwood Wong, Background Painter – "Pea Dummy/Mary Anning" – The Mr. Peabody & Sherman Show (Netflix)** ‡
Outstanding Writing in a Preschool Animated Program	**Joshua Mapleston, Cleon Prineas, Josh Wakely – Beat Bugs (Netflix)** ‡; Mark Huckerby, Nick Ostler – Peter Rabbit (Nickelodeon); Jonny Belt, Robert Scull, Lucas Mills – Bubble Guppies (Nickelodeon); Stephanie Simpson, Gabe Pulliam – Octonauts (Disney Junior); James R. Backshall, Jiro Okida, Jeff Sweeney, John Van Bruggen, Craig Young – Justin Time GO! (Netflix); Chris Nee, Kent Redeker, Chelsea Beyl, Kerri Grant – Doc McStuffins: Toy Hospital (Disney Junior)
Outstanding Writing in an Animated Program	**Marc Guggenheim – Trollhunters (Netflix)** ‡; Mitch Watson, Sharon Flynn, Benjamin Lapides, Elliott Owen, Michael Ryan – All Hail King Julien (Netflix/DreamWorks Animation); C.H. Greenblatt, Shane Houghton, Kevin A. Kramer, Amalia Levari, Dani Michaeli – Harvey Beaks (Nickelodeon); Jeff "Swampy" Marsh, Kyle Menke, Dan Povenmire – Milo Murphy's Law (Disney Channel); Abram Makowka, Darin Mark, Jared Mark – Lost in Oz: Extended Adventure (Amazon)
Outstanding Writing in a Children's, Pre-School Children's or Family Viewing Program	**Joey Mazzarino, Molly Boylan, Geri Cole, Annie Evans, Christine Ferraro, Michael Goldberg, Emily Kingsley, Luis Santeiro, Ed Valentine, Belinda Ward, John Weidman – Sesame Street (HBO)** ‡; J.J. Johnson, Christin Simms, Amanda Spagnolo – Annedroids (Amazon); Lucy Goodman, Andrew Viner – Bookaboo (Amazon); Tim McKeon, Amy Benham, Charles Johnston, Adam Peltzman, Mark De Angelis, Robby Hoffman – Odd Squad (PBS); Charlie Engelman – Weird But True! (Nat Geo)
Outstanding Writing Special Class	**Tim McKeon, Mark De Angelis, Adam Peltzman – Odd Squad: The Movie (PBS)** ‡; Brad Lachman, Mark Waxman – 90th Annual Macy's Thanksgiving Day Parade (NBC); Kevin A Leman II, Jason Gelles, Lauren Pomerantz, Ellen DeGeneres, Alison Balian, Jason Blackman, Jamie Brunton, Rick Mitchell, Gil Reif, Troy Thomas, Adam Yenser – The Ellen DeGeneres Show (Syndicated); Craig Brown, Neil Casey, Mikey Day, Karey Dornetto, Emily Heller, Peter Schultz, David Wild – 32nd Independent Spirit Awards (IFC); John Chester – SuperSoul Shorts – Maggie the Cow (OWN)
Outstanding Directing in an Animated Program	**Rodrigo Blaas, Guillermo del Toro – Trollhunters (Netflix)** ‡; Sung Jin Ahn – Little Big Awesome (Amazon); Saschka Unseld – A Love Story (YouTube); Greg Miller – The Mr. Peabody & Sherman Show (Netflix/DreamWorks Animation); Brandon Oldenburg – Taking Flight (takingflightfilm.com)
Outstanding Directing in a Preschool Animated Programs	**Drew Hodges – Tumble Leaf (Amazon)** ‡; Evan Spiridellis, Jacob Streilein, Ian Worrel – Ask the StoryBots (Netflix); Josh Wakely – Beat Bugs (Netflix); David McCamley – Peter Rabbit (Nickelodeon); Jamie Badminton, Rufus Blacklock, Jack Tilley – The Snowy Day (Amazon)
Outstanding Directing in a Children's, Pre-School Children's or Family Viewing Program	**Ken Diego, Benjamin Lehmann, Joey Mazzarino, Scott Preston, Chuck Vinson, Matt Vogel, Nadine Zylstra – Sesame Street (HBO)** ‡; J.J. Johnson – Dino Dan: Trek's Adventures (Nickelodeon); Jason deVilliers, Christian Jacobs, Hugh Martin – Mutt & Stuff (Nickelodeon); J.J. Johnson, Stephen Reynolds, Stefan Scaini, Warren P. Sonada – Odd Squad (PBS); Richard Rotter – Terrific Trucks Save Christmas (Sprout)
Outstanding Directing in a Lifestyle/Culinary/Travel Program	**Joseph Rosendo – Joseph Rosendo's Travelscope (PBS)** ‡; Tim Duffy – Eat the World with Emeril Lagasse (Amazon); Brian Mait – 1st Look (NBC); Anne Fox – Giada's Holiday Handbook (Food Network); Rob George, William O'Hara – Home & Family (Hallmark Channel); Morgan Fallon – The Mind of a Chef (PBS); Esther Reyes – Planet Primetime (Travel Channel)
Outstanding Directing in a Talk Show/Entertainment News/Morning Program	**Jim Gaines – Today Show (NBC)** ‡; Nora Gerard, Kate D'Arcy Coleman, Mark Dicso, Patricia Finnegan, Jessica Frank, Catherine Kay, Lindsley McGrath, Jyll Phillips Friedman, Bernard Rozenberg – CBS Sunday Morning (CBS); Liz Patrick, Ken Cooper, Huck Hacksted, Diana Horn – The Ellen DeGeneres Show (Syndicated); Jeff Winn, Tony Barrett, Liliana Olszewski, Joseph Beltrano, Camp Childers, Jerry Jordan, Gary Mace, Kathy Matey, Todd McKee – Good Morning America (ABC); Joe Carolei, Jill Dove, Kevin Hamburger, Carlos Moreno, Ann Rogerson – The Talk (CBS)
Outstanding Directing in a Game show	**Adam Sandler- The Price Is Right (CBS)** ‡; Ken Fuchs – Family Feud (Syndicated); Kevin McCarthy – Jeopardy! (Syndicated); Lenn Goodside – Let's Make a Deal (CBS)
Outstanding Directing Special Class	**John Chester – SuperSoul Shorts – Maggie the Cow (OWN)** ‡; Ron De Moraes – 90th Annual Macy's Thanksgiving Day Parade (NBC); Travis North – Lucky Dog with Brandon McMillan (CBS); Gillian Brown, Alexandra Chaden, Michael Steed – The Mind of a Chef – Potluck Music Special (YouTube); J.J. Johnson – Odd Squad: The Movie (PBS)
Outstanding Art Direction/Set Decoration/Scenic Design	**David Gallo, Keith Olsen, Randall Richards – Sesame Street (HBO)** ‡; Paul Andrejco, David Bryan, Ian Emes, Darren Pickering – Bookaboo (Amazon); Karen Weber, Jennifer Moller – The Ellen DeGeneres Show (Syndicated); Leslie Segrete, Jason Kirschner – Harry (Syndicated); Jeff Hall, Matt Tognacci, Debra Echard – The Talk (CBS)
Outstanding Main Title and Graphic Design	**Mike Houston, Ryan Frost, Angelique Georges, Naoko Saito, Daniel de Graaf – The Mind of a Chef (PBS)** ‡; Ian Worrel, Taylor Clutter, Jeff Gill, Nikolas Ilic, Kendall Nelson, Taylor Price, Evan Spiridellis, Jacob Streilein, Nate Theis, Eddie West – Ask the StoryBots (Netflix); Josh Wakely, Mark Appleby, Pablo De La Torre – Beat Bugs (Netflix); Matthew J.R. Bishop, Matt Crookshank, Nial McFadyen – Odd Squad (PBS); Rodrigo Blaas, Andy Erekson, Jonathan Catalan, Dai Weier, John Laus, David M.V. Jones – Trollhunters (Netflix)
Outstanding Lighting Direction	**Marisa Davis, Kelly Waldman – The Talk (CBS)** ‡; Kevin Cauley, Andrew Webberly, Tom Beck – The Ellen DeGeneres Show (Syndicated); Alan Blacher, Shawn Kaufman – Harry (Syndicated); James Gallagher – The View (ABC); Jeff Engel – Wheel of Fortune (Syndicated)
Outstanding Technical Team	**Mark Haffner, Steven Schnall – CBS Sunday Morning (CBS)** ‡; Louis Fernandez, Mark Haffner, Fountain Jones, Steve Ancona, Maximilian Avans, Joe Basile, Dave Cabano, John Curtin, Jared Hanna, Anthony Planes, Claus Stuhlweissenburg, Lee Wardan, Mark Ogden, Al Schatz, Gary Schaub- CBS This Morning (CBS); Zach Greenberg, Forrest "Chip" Fraser IV, Donavan Gilbuena, Brian Loewe, Jimmy Moran, Timothy O'Neill, David Rhea, David Weeks, Paul Wileman – The Ellen DeGeneres Show (Syndicated); TBA – Good Morning America (ABC); Richie Drummond, Tom Guadarrama, Frank Biondo, Mark Britt, Jerry Cancel, Shaun Harkins, James Meek – Sesame Street (HBO)
Outstanding Cinematography	**John Chester, Mallory Cunningham, Kyle Romanek – SuperSoul Shorts – Maggie the Cow (OWN)** ‡; Renea Veneri Stewart – Family Ingredients (PBS); Jon Speyers – Joseph Rosendo's Travelscope (PBS); Raymond Tsang – Rock the Park (Syndicated); Christopher Verner, Drew Pendleton – Supernatural Encounters (Daystar Television Network)
Outstanding Single Camera Editing	**Alex Durham, ACE, Ulf Buddensieck, Brent Hamilton, Carlos Rivera, Uma Sanasaryan – Eat the World with Emeril Lagasse (Amazon)** ‡; C. Andrew Hall, David Johnson – The Henry Ford's Innovation Nation (CBS); Nick Brigden, Jonathan Cianfrani, Angie Dix, Yeong-A Kim, Rachel Whitaker – The Mind of a Chef (PBS); Jennifer Essex-Chew, Courtney Goldman, Christopher Minns – Odd Squad (PBS); Mike Varga, Art Citron, Jocelyn Tarquini – Weird But True! (Nat Geo)
Outstanding Multiple Camera Editing	**Tudor Applen, Alberto Arce, Jay Avdul, Randall Boyd, Katherine Cannady, Craig Casey, Justin Curran, Whitney Dunn, Jennifer Fitzpatrick, Mark Grizzle, Mike Hall, Noah Harald, Diana Jenkins, Chris Jolissaint, Wass Kaidbey, Scott Madrigal, Kevin McCormick, David Milhous, Farbod Mirfakhrai, Sean Olson, Joel Ray, Neal Reimschussel, Jim Robinson, Tim Rodd, Curtis Sacket, Kevin Wildermuth- Crime Watch Daily With Chris Hansen (Syndicated)** ‡; William H. Ellison – Pocahontas-Dove of Peace (CBN/The 700 Club); Jamie Belz, John Binninger, John Rantz, Gabriel Alamanza, Austin Hepp – The Ellen DeGeneres Show (Syndicated); Robby Rotfeld, Tim McCusker – Xploration DIY Sci (Syndicated); Todd E. James, Jesse Averna, Ray Chin, Memo Salazar, Jordan Santora – Sesame Street (HBO)
Outstanding Live and Direct to Tape Sound Mixing	**Terry Fountain, Dirk Sciarrotta, Phil Gebhardt – The Ellen DeGeneres Show (Syndicated)** ‡; Jorge Silva, Derek Vintschger – The Dr. Oz Show (Syndicated); Steve Lettie, Tony Rollins, Charlie Bouis, Patrick Smith – Harry (Syndicated); Michael Dooley, Brandon Niznik, Brian Rushing, Patrick Simon – Home & Family (Hallmark Channel); Garry Elghammer, Jim Slanger – Steve Harvey (Syndicated)
Outstanding Sound Mixing – Live Action	**Brian Bracken, Pat Donahue, Benny Mouthon, CAS, Andrey Netboy, Lou Teti – The Mind of a Chef (PBS)** ‡; Blag Ahilov, John Bradshaw, David Guerra, Charles Duchesne, Sean Karp, Will Preventis, Noah Siegel – Annedroids (Amazon); Blag Ahilov, Charles Duchesne, Sean Karp, Will Preventis, Noah Siegel – Bookaboo (Amazon); Andy Snavley – Eat the World with Emeril Lagasse (Amazon); Igor Bezuglov, John Bradshaw, Sean Karp, Andrew McDonnell, Hans Ohm, Will Preventis, Noah Siegel – Odd Squad: The Movie (PBS); Chris Prinzivalli, Michael Barrett, Michael Croiter, Dick Maitland, C.A.S – Sesame Street (HBO)
Outstanding Sound Mixing – Animation	**Dicken Berglund, Tony Solis, Patrick Rodman, CAS – Lost in Oz: Extended Adventure (Amazon)**; Aran Tanchum, DJ Lynch, Ian Nyeste – All Hail King Julien (Netflix); Otis Van Osten, Carlos Sanches, CAS – Dragons: Race to the Edge (Netflix); Roberto Dominguez Alegria, Justin Brinsfield, Matt Corey, Rob McIntyre, Thomas J. Maydeck, C.A.S.- Kung Fu Panda: Legends of Awesomeness (Nickelodeon); Carlos Sanches, CAS – Trollhunters (Netflix)
Outstanding Sound Mixing in a Preschool Animated Program	**Timothy J. Borquez, Nicholas Gotten, III – Sofia the First (Disney Junior)** ‡; Leonardo Nasca, Jared Nugent, Jeffrey Shiffman – Ask the StoryBots (Netflix); Brent Clark, Sam Hayward, Bob Mothersbaugh, Wes Swales – Beat Bugs (Netflix); Roberto D. Alegria, Devon G. Bowman, Alex Hall, Rob McIntyre, DJ Lynch – Dinotrux (Netflix); Steven Maher – Peter Rabbit (Nickelodeon); Ben Hood – The Snowy Day (Amazon); John Jackson – Tumble Leaf (Amazon)
Outstanding Sound Editing – Live Action	**Michael Barrett, Chris Prinzivalli, Michael Croiter, Jorge Muelle, Paul Rudolph, Chris Sassano, Dick Maitland, C.A.S.- Sesame Street (HBO)** ‡; Sean Karp, Blag Ahilov, Charles Duchesne, Will Preventis, Noah Siegel, Jakob Thiesen – Annedroids (Amazon); Dean Gaveau – Eat the World with Emeril Lagasse (Amazon); Brandon Bak, P. Jason Macneill, John D. Smith, John Sievert, Christopher Smart – Odd Squad: The Movie (PBS); Robby Rotfeld – Xploration DIY Sci (Syndicated)
Outstanding Sound Editing – Animation	**Eric Paulsen, Patrick Rodman, CAS, James Scullion – Lost in Oz: Extended Adventure (Amazon)** ‡; Shawn Bohonos, Robbi Smith, Heather Olsen, David Bonilla, Shaun Cunningham, Aran Tanchum, John Lampinen – The Adventures of Puss in Boots (Netflix); Dan Smith, Otis Van Osten, Josh Johnson, Jason Oliver – Dragons: Race to the Edge (Netflix); Gary Falcone, Benjamin Wynn, Jeremy Zuckerman, Rob McIntyre, Anna Adams, Andrew Ing, Marc Schmidt, Roberto Dominguez Alegria, Cynthia Merrill – Kung Fu Panda: Legends of Awesomeness (Nickelodeon); David Acord, Reda El-Kheloufi, Troels Rohde Jørgensen, Stefan Leissner, Kåre Kabel Mai, Matthew Wood, Tobias Hellkvist – Lego Star Wars: The Freemaker Adventures (Disney XD)
Outstanding Sound Editing in a Preschool Animated Program	**Andrew Ing, DJ Lynch, Marc Schmidt, Roberto D. Alegria, Devon G. Bowman, Alfredo Douglas, Rob McIntyre, Monique Reymond, Shawn Bohonos – Dinotrux (Netflix)** ‡; Jeffrey Shiffman, David Carfagno, Brad Meyer, Nicholas J. Ainsworth, Elliot Herman – Ask the StoryBots (Netflix); Jared Dwyer, Sam Hayward, Blair Slater – Beat Bugs (Netflix); John Jackson, Brooke Lowrey – Tumble Leaf (Amazon); Sarah Vorhees – VeggieTales in the House (Netflix)
Outstanding Music Direction and Composition	**Rossanna S. Wright, Kris Bowers – The Snowy Day (Amazon)** ‡; Kevin Kliesch – Sofia The First (Disney Junior); Michael Kramer – Lego Starwars: The Freemakers Adventures (PBS); David Burns, Matt Ouimet – Pig Goat Banana Cricket (Nickelodeon); Vivek Maddala – The Tom & Jerry Show (CN)
Outstanding Original Song	**"She's Not Very Nice" Parry Gripp – Disney 7D (Disney XD)** ‡; "Dickinson Duet" D. D. Jackson, Billy Aronson – Peg + Cat (PBS); "The Legend of Everfree" Daniel Ingram, Joanna Lewis, Kristine Songco – My Little Pony Equestria Girls: The Legend of Everfree (Netflix); "Sisi Ni Sawa" Beau Black, Sarah Mirza, Ford Riley, Kevin Hopps – The Lion Guard (Disney Junior); "Morse Code" Katie Herzig – The Mr. Peabody & Sherman Show (Netflix)
Outstanding Musical Performance in a Daytime Program	**Cynthia Erivo and the Cast of The Color Purple – Today Show (NBC)** ‡; Charles Bradley – CBS This Morning Saturday (CBS); Michael Bublé – Live! with Kelly (Syndicated); Pentatonix – Rachael Ray (Syndicated); St. Paul and The Broken Bones – CBS This Morning Saturday (CBS)
Outstanding Costume Design/Styling	**Christine Toye – Odd Squad (PBS)** ‡; Cara Giannini, Tiffany Feller, Natalia Foroutan, Kristen Greven, Julie Meinhart – The Talk (CBS); Sara Bethune – Pocahontas-Dove of Peace (CBN/The 700 Club); Andrea Hakesley, Lux Petrova, hoening, Sally Thomas, David Valentine, Jason Weber – Sesame Street (HBO); Christian Svenson – Project Mc² (Netflix); Brian Hemesath, Matthew Hemesath, Mary Brehmer, Elizabeth Hara, Michelle Hickey, Rollie Krewson, Sarah Lafferty, Lara Maclean, Casey Miller, Constance Peterson, Jane Pien, Kate Rusek, Sierra Sc
Outstanding Hairstyling	**Liz Roelands – Odd Squad (PBS)** ‡; Vickie Mynes, Lucianna Pezzolo, Brittany Spaulding, Michael Scott Ward – The Talk (CBS); Sara Seidman Vance – Pocahontas-Dove of Peace (CBN/The 700 Club); Rosa Amoedo, Derick Monroe, Dora Smagler – The View (ABC); Diane D'Agostino – LIVE with Kelly (Syndicated)
Outstanding Makeup	**Jenna Servatius – Odd Squad (PBS)** ‡; Cassondra Knoeller, Ja Nina Lee, Mary McNamara – Harry (Syndicated); Michelle Champagne – Live! with Kelly (Syndicated); Jude Alcala, Stephanie Cozart Burton, Michelle Daurio, Dell McDonald, Ann-Marie Oliver, Gabbi Pascua – The Talk (CBS); Rebecca Borman, Lynette Broom, Karen Dupiche – The View (ABC)
Outstanding Stunt Coordination	**Terry James – Days of Our Lives (NBC)** ‡; Terry James – The Young and the Restless (CBS )
