= I Hate Valentine's Day =

- Theatrical release poster
- Directed by: Nia Vardalos
- Screenplay by: Nia Vardalos
- Story by: Nia Vardalos; Stephen David; Ben Zook
- Produced by: Madeleine Sherak; William Sherak; Jason Shuman
- Starring: Nia Vardalos; John Corbett
- Cinematography: Brian Pryzpek
- Edited by: Steve Edwards; Tony Lombardo
- Music by: Keith Power
- Production companies: Blue Star Pictures; I Hate Vday Productions; ICB Entertainment Finance; My Bench Productions
- Distributed by: IFC Films
- Release date: July 3, 2009
- Running time: 98 minutes
- Country: United States
- Language: English
- Box office: $3.5 million

I Hate Valentine's Day is a 2009 romantic comedy film written and directed by Nia Vardalos. The film stars Vardalos and John Corbett, previously seen together in Vardalos' hit 2002 film My Big Fat Greek Wedding. The film was released on July 3, 2009, by IFC Films.

== Plot ==
Florist Genevieve Gernier (Vardalos) believes that the best way to achieve romantic fulfillment is to never go on more than five dates with the same man. She is forced to reassess her philosophy when she meets Greg Gatlin (Corbett), a restaurateur who moves into her neighborhood.

== Cast ==
- Nia Vardalos as Genevieve Gernier
- John Corbett as Greg Gatlin
- Amir Arison as Bob
- Rachel Dratch as Kathy Jeemy
- Judah Friedlander as Dan O'Finn
- Stephen Guarino as Bill
- Zoe Kazan as Tammy Greenwood
- Jason Mantzoukas as Brian Blowdell
- Jay O. Sanders as Tim the delivery guy
- Suzanne Shepherd as Edie
- Mike Starr as John
- Gary Wilmes as Cal
- Lynda Gravatt as Rose
- Ben Schwartz as Tammy's Date

== Box office ==
I Hate Valentine's Day was released in the United States on July 3, 2009, in three theaters. The film grossed $5,009 in its opening weekend, a per-screen-average of $1,670. It grossed $3,510,643 as of July 1, 2013.

== Reception ==
I Hate Valentine's Day was poorly reviewed by critics. Based on Rotten Tomatoes, 19% of 26 critics' reviews are positive, with an average rating of 3.5/10. The website's consensus reads: "This boilerplate comedy lacks ingenuity or humor and features mediocre dialogue that sounds less like conversation and more like stand-up shtick."

Metacritic gave the film an average score of 17 out of 100, based on 14 reviews. It is placed among the site's top 200 films with the worst reviews of all time.
