= Daytime Emmy Award for Outstanding Digital Daytime Drama Series =

Former television award

- Country: United States
- Presented by: NATAS; ATAS
- First award: 2011
- Final award: 2021
- Website: emmyonline.org/daytime

The Daytime Emmy Award for Outstanding Digital Daytime Drama Series was an award presented by the National Academy of Television Arts and Sciences (NATAS) and Academy of Television Arts & Sciences (ATAS).

The first incarnation of the award was the Daytime Emmy Award for Outstanding Special Class Short Format Daytime, which was given to the soap opera web series Venice: The Series at the 38th Daytime Emmy Awards in 2011. The category became Outstanding New Approaches Original Daytime Program or Series in 2013, and evolved into Outstanding New Approaches Drama Series in 2014. It was renamed Outstanding Digital Daytime Drama Series in 2016. In 2015, Alina Adams of Entertainment Weekly attributed the addition and evolution of the category to the increasing audience for, and presence of, independent soap opera web series.

The associated category Outstanding Performer in a New Approaches Drama Series was added for the 42nd Daytime Creative Arts Emmy Awards in 2015, with Martha Byrne the first recipient for her role as Alexis Jordan/Joanne Edwards on Anacostia. In 2016, this was split into two categories, Outstanding Actress in a Digital Daytime Drama Series and Outstanding Actor in a Digital Daytime Drama Series, with Mary Beth Evans and Kristos Andrews winning for their mother-son roles of Sara and Peter Garrett on The Bay. These performer categories were further expanded to four for the 44th Daytime Creative Arts Emmy Awards: Outstanding Lead Actress in a Digital Daytime Drama Series, Outstanding Lead Actor in a Digital Daytime Drama Series, Outstanding Supporting or Guest Actress in a Digital Daytime Drama Series, and Outstanding Supporting or Guest Actor in a Digital Daytime Drama Series. In 2018, the Outstanding Supporting or Guest Actress/Actor in a Digital Daytime Drama Series categories became Outstanding Supporting Actress/Actor in a Digital Daytime Drama Series, and a fifth performer category was added, Outstanding Guest Performer in a Digital Daytime Drama Series. New categories were also added for Outstanding Writing in a Digital Drama Series and Outstanding Directing in a Digital Drama Series.

To be eligible for the Outstanding Digital Daytime Drama Series category, programming was required to be "continuous, episodic works of dramatic fiction from over-the-air, cable, satellite and internet broadcasters" which have more than three but less than 35 original episodes; 35 episodes was the minimum required for the main Daytime Emmy Award for Outstanding Drama Series category. The award recognized producers, directors, and writers credited on a minimum of 19 percent of total episodes first aired in the applicable year. The performer categories applied to actresses and actors who appeared in these series. The Digital Daytime Drama Series and related performer awards were typically awarded as part of the Creative Arts Emmy Awards ceremony, a separate presentation of awards which included recognition of technical and craft categories.

In December 2021, the ATAS and the NATAS announced a major realignment of the Daytime and Primetime Emmy Award ceremonies. Other than daytime serial dramas (as defined as an episodic, multi-camera drama serial that airs on a weekday basis, or a reboot or spin-off of such a series) or children's programming (which will move to the new Children's & Family Emmy Awards), all categories for scripted comedies and dramas will now fall under Primetime Emmys, regardless of scheduling.

== Winners and nominees ==
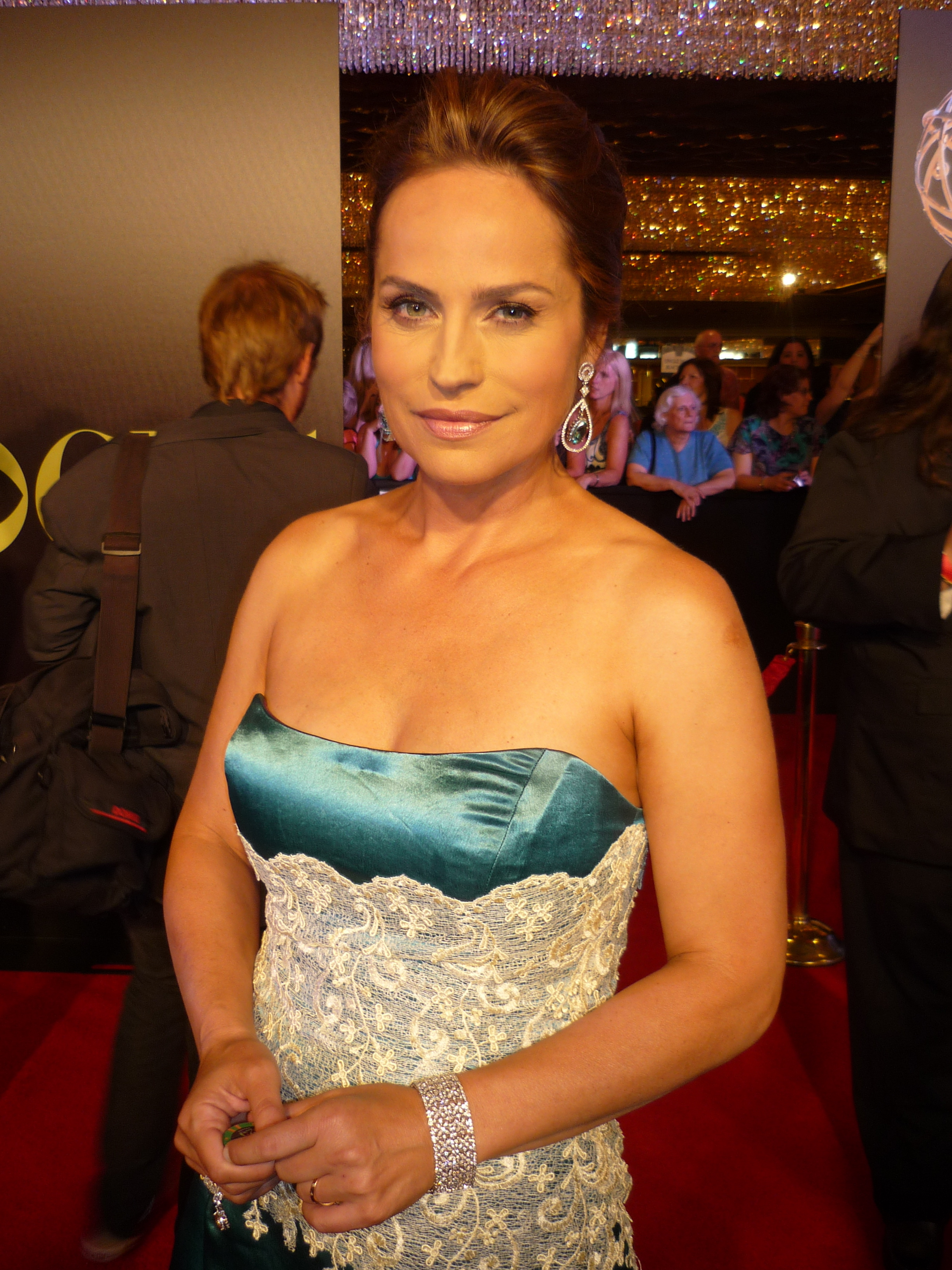
Crystal Chappell won the first Daytime Emmy Award for Outstanding Special Class Short Format Daytime in 2011 as an executive producer of Venice: The Series. She won again for Venice in 2014, when the category had been renamed Outstanding New Approaches Drama Series.

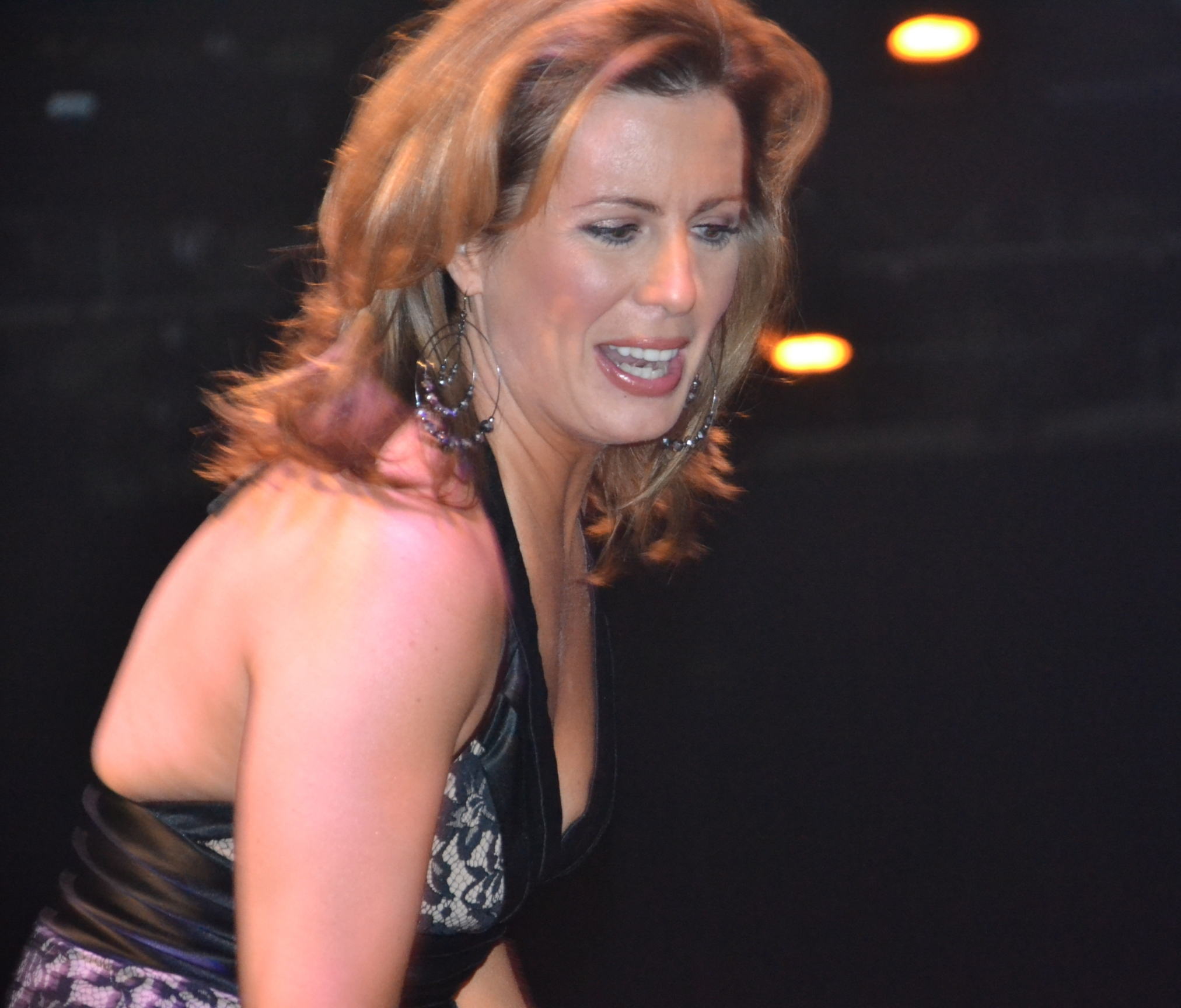
Martha Byrne was the first recipient of the newly established Performer in a New Approaches Drama Series award in 2015.

The winner in each category is in bold.

Year	Award	Category	Nominee(s)	Ref.
2011	38th Daytime Emmy Awards	Outstanding Special Class Short Format Daytime	**Venice: The Series (venicetheseries.com)**; Gotham The Series (YouTube); Tasty Time with ZeFronk (Disney Channel)	
2012	39th Daytime Creative Arts Emmy Awards	Outstanding Special Class Short Format Daytime	**The Time I ... Got 322 Pairs of Shoes for my Birthday**; The Bay (Blip); Disney A Poem Is...; Nickelodeon's All Together Now Anti Bullying Campaign (Dora the Explorer Interstitial); The Time I...(Dyslexia)	
2013	40th Daytime Creative Arts Emmy Awards	Outstanding New Approaches Original Daytime Program or Series	**The Beauty Inside**; Chuck Vanderchuck; Design Squad Nation; Get the Math	
2014	41st Daytime Emmy Awards	Outstanding New Approaches Drama Series	**Venice: The Series (venicetheseries.com)**; DeVanity (devanity.com); Tainted Dreams (YouTube); The Power Inside	
2015	42nd Daytime Creative Arts Emmy Awards	Outstanding New Approaches Drama Series	**The Bay (Blip)**; Anacostia (YouTube); Beacon Hill the Series (beaconhilltheseries.com); East Los High (Hulu)	
2015	42nd Daytime Creative Arts Emmy Awards	Outstanding Performer in a New Approaches Drama Series	**Martha Byrne as Alexis Jordan/Joanne Edwards on Anacostia (YouTube)**; Sarah Brown as Katherine Wesley on Beacon Hill the Series (beaconhilltheseries.com); Andrea Evans as Vivian Price on DeVanity (devanity.com); Alicia Minshew as Sara Preston on Beacon Hill the Series (beaconhilltheseries.com); Vannessa Vasquez as Camila Barrios on East Los High (Hulu); Danielle Vega as Ceci Camayo on East Los High (Hulu)	
2016	43rd Daytime Creative Arts Emmy Awards	Outstanding Digital Daytime Drama Series	**The Bay: The Series (thebaytheseries.com)**; East Los High (Hulu); EastSiders (Vimeo); Vanity (YouTube); Winterthorne (winterthorne.com)	
2016	43rd Daytime Creative Arts Emmy Awards	Outstanding Actress in a Digital Daytime Drama Series	**Mary Beth Evans as Sara Garrett on The Bay The Series (thebaytheseries.com)**; Kathleen Gati as Valentina Winterthorne on Winterthorne (winterthorne.com); Elizabeth Hubbard as Eva Montgomery on Anacostia (YouTube); Lilly Melgar as Janice Ramos on The Bay The Series (thebaytheseries.com); Patsy Pease as Lola Baker on The Bay The Series (thebaytheseries.com)	
2016	43rd Daytime Creative Arts Emmy Awards	Outstanding Actor in a Digital Daytime Drama Series	**Kristos Andrews as Peter Garrett on The Bay The Series (thebaytheseries.com)**; Van Hansis as Thom on EastSiders (Vimeo); Rick Hearst as Mr. Ryan on Youthful Daze (youthfuldaze.com); J. D. Pardo as Jesús on East Los High (Hulu); Kevin Spirtas as Dominic Delacort on Winterthorne (winterthorne.com)	
2017	44th Daytime Creative Arts Emmy Awards	Outstanding Digital Daytime Drama Series	**The Bay: The Series (Amazon.com)**; Red Bird (Amazon.com); Tainted Dreams (Amazon.com); Tough Love (YouTube); Venice: The Series (venicetheseries.com)	
2017	44th Daytime Creative Arts Emmy Awards	Outstanding Lead Actress in a Digital Daytime Drama Series	**Mary Beth Evans as Sara Garrett on The Bay The Series (Amazon.com)**; Anne Marie Cummings as Michelle Macabee on Conversations in L.A. (conversationsinla.com); Alexandra Goodman as Kitty Mae on Red Bird (Amazon.com); Lilly Melgar as Janice Ramos on The Bay The Series (Amazon.com); Kelley Menighan Hensley as Veronica Ashford on Tainted Dreams (Amazon.com)	
2017	44th Daytime Creative Arts Emmy Awards	Outstanding Lead Actor in a Digital Daytime Drama Series	**Kristos Andrews as Peter Garrett/Young Jack Madison on The Bay The Series (Amazon.com)**; Anthony Anderson as Sean Williams-Grey on Anacostia (YouTube); Michael Lowry as Jordan Bradford on Tainted Dreams (Amazon.com); Michael McShane as Sam on Red Bird (Amazon.com); Gustavo Velasquez as Gus Borrero on Conversations in L.A. (conversationsinla.com)	
2017	44th Daytime Creative Arts Emmy Awards	Outstanding Supporting or Guest Actress in a Digital Daytime Drama Series	**Carolyn Hennesy as Karen Blackwell on The Bay The Series (Amazon.com)**; Jade Harlow as Lianna Ramos on The Bay The Series (Amazon.com); Vanita Harbour as Nicole Hampstead on Conversations in L.A. (conversationsinla.com); Natalia Livingston as Liza Park on Tainted Dreams (Amazon.com); Kym Whitley as Big Candi on The Bay The Series (Amazon.com)	
2017	44th Daytime Creative Arts Emmy Awards	Outstanding Supporting or Guest Actor in a Digital Daytime Drama Series	**Nicolas Coster as Mayor Jack Madison on The Bay The Series (Amazon.com)**; Matthew Ashford as Steven Jensen on The Bay The Series (Amazon.com); Ronn Moss as John Blackwell on The Bay The Series (Amazon.com); Armin Shimerman as Max on Red Bird (Amazon.com); Anthony Wilkinson as Anthony DiGiacomo on Tainted Dreams (Amazon.com)	
2018	45th Daytime Creative Arts Emmy Awards	Outstanding Digital Daytime Drama Series	**The Bay: The Series (Amazon)**; EastSiders (Netflix); Ladies of the Lake (Amazon); Tainted Dreams (Amazon); Venice: The Series (venicetheseries.com); Zac & Mia (Verizon go90)	
2018	45th Daytime Creative Arts Emmy Awards	Outstanding Lead Actress in a Digital Daytime Drama Series	**Anne Winters as Mia Phillips on Zac & Mia (Verizon go90)**; Mary Beth Evans as Sara Garrett on The Bay The Series (Amazon); Vanessa Kelly as Journee on Giants (YouTube); Lilly Melgar as Janice Ramos on The Bay The Series (Amazon); Alicia Minshew as Angelica Caruso on Tainted Dreams (Amazon)	
2018	45th Daytime Creative Arts Emmy Awards	Outstanding Lead Actor in a Digital Daytime Drama Series	**Kristos Andrews as Peter Garrett on The Bay The Series (Amazon)**; James Bland as Malachi on Giants (YouTube); Richard Brooks as Augustus Barringer on The Rich and the Ruthless (UMC); Van Hansis as Thom on EastSiders (Netflix); Kian Lawley as Zac Meier on Zac & Mia (Verizon go90)	
2018	45th Daytime Creative Arts Emmy Awards	Outstanding Supporting Actress in a Digital Daytime Drama Series	**Jade Harlow as Lianna Ramos on The Bay The Series (Amazon)**; Molly Burnett as Laura on Relationship Status { (Verizon go90); Terri Ivens as Orchid on The Bay The Series (Amazon); Kira Reed as Jo Connors on The Bay The Series (Amazon); Alexis G. Zall as Zac Meier on Zac & Mia (Verizon go90)	
2018	45th Daytime Creative Arts Emmy Awards	Outstanding Supporting Actor in a Digital Daytime Drama Series	**Eric Nelsen as Daniel Garrett on The Bay The Series (Amazon)**; Brandon Beemer as Evan Blackwell on The Bay The Series (Amazon); Stephen Guarino as Quincy on EastSiders (Netflix); John Halbach as Ian on EastSiders (Netflix); Derrell Whitt as Will Campbell on The Bay The Series (Amazon)	
2018	45th Daytime Creative Arts Emmy Awards	Outstanding Guest Performer in a Digital Daytime Drama Series	**No award** (Note: In 2018, Patrika Darbo initially won in this category for her performance as Mickey Walker on Amazon's The Bay The Series. The award was revoked and vacated after it was determined that Darbo appeared in a prior season of The Bay and entered scenes from multiple episodes for judging, both violations of the TV Academy's submission guidelines. An award was not given to runner-up Jennifer Bassey, portraying Beverly Newman on YouTube series Anacostia, because she too submitted scenes from multiple episodes. Thomas Calabro, nominated for his role as Arthur Tobin on The Bay, also had his nomination in this category rescinded for appearing in a prior season.); Patrika Darbo as Mickey Walker on The Bay The Series (Amazon) (disqualified); Jennifer Bassey as Beverly Newman on Anacostia (YouTube); Thomas Calabro as Arthur Tobin on The Bay The Series (Amazon) (disqualified); Chad Duell as Adam Kenway on The Bay The Series (Amazon); Mike E. Winfield as Jeremy on Conversations in L. A. (conversationsinla.com)	
2018	45th Daytime Creative Arts Emmy Awards	Outstanding Writing in a Digital Drama Series	**Zac & Mia (Verizon go90)**; The Bay: The Series (Amazon); Conversations in L. A. (conversationsinla.com); EastSiders (Netflix); Relationship Status (Verizon go90)	
2018	45th Daytime Creative Arts Emmy Awards	Outstanding Directing in a Digital Drama Series	**The Bay: The Series (Amazon)**; EastSiders (Netflix); Relationship Status (Verizon go90); Venice: The Series (venicetheseries.com); Zac & Mia (Verizon go90)	
2019	46th Daytime Emmy Awards	Outstanding Digital Daytime Drama Series	**After Forever (Amazon Studios)**; The Bay: The Series (Amazon Studios); Giants (YouTube TV); The New 30 (YouTube TV); Youth & Consequences (YouTube Premium)	
2019	46th Daytime Emmy Awards	Outstanding Lead Actress in a Digital Daytime Drama Series	**Vanessa Baden Kelly**, **as Journee on**; **Giants (YouTube)**: Jade Harlow as Lianna Ramos on; The Bay The Series (Amazon Prime Video): Liana Liberato, as McKenna Brady on; Light as a Feather (Hulu): Shanti Lowry, as Yolanda Rodriguez on; Bronx SIU (UMC/Amazon Prime Video): Liz Vassey, as Dr. Gillian Hunt on Riley Parra (tello Films)	
2020	47th Daytime Emmy Awards	Outstanding Digital Daytime Drama Series	**The Bay: The Series (Amazon Prime)**; After Forever (Amazon Prime); Dark Web (Amazon Prime); EastSiders (Netflix); Studio City (Amazon Prime)	
