= Stephen Guarino =

American actor

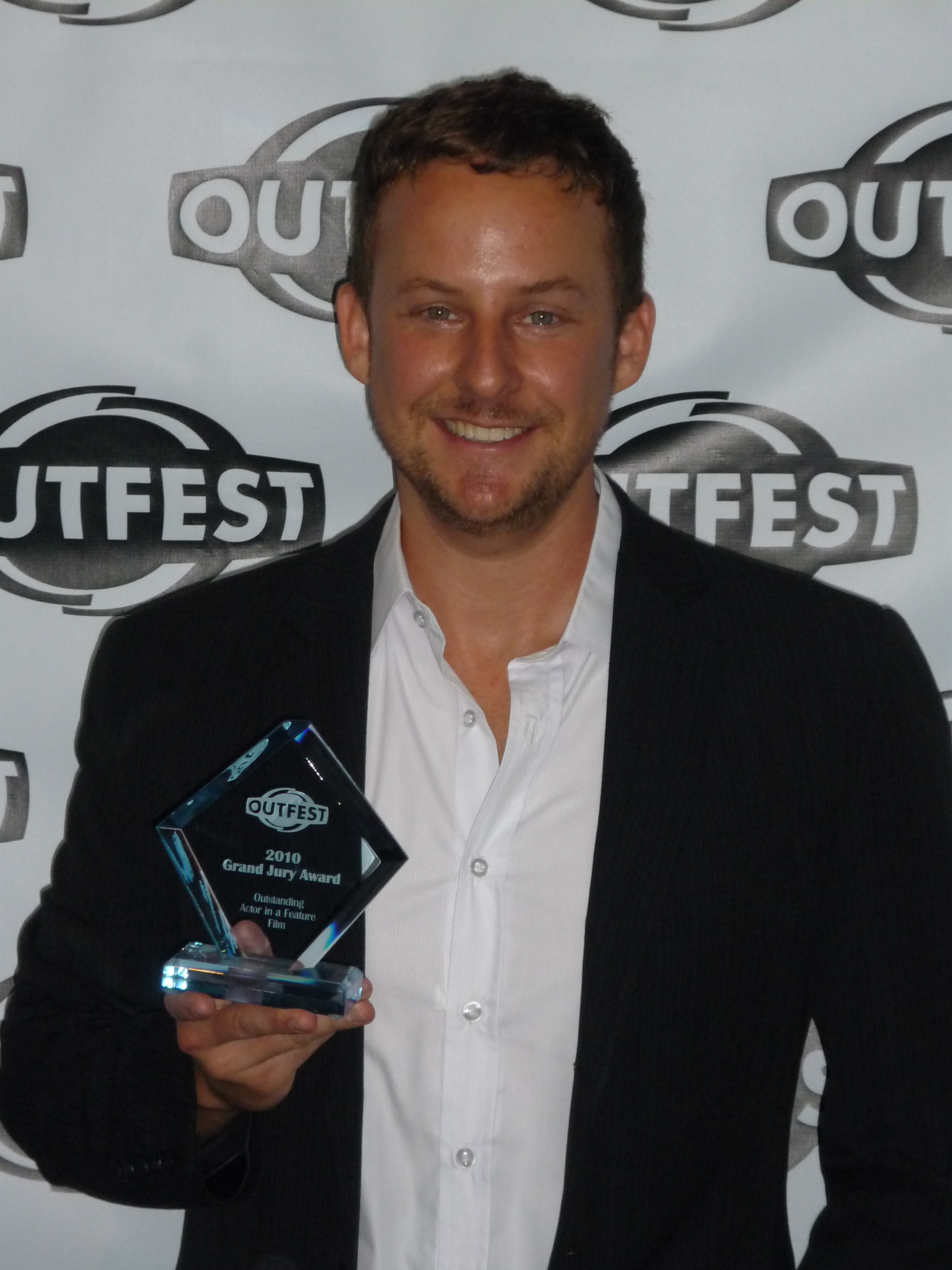
- Guarino in July 2010
- Born: Stephen Daniel Guarino; November 14, 1975 (age 50)
- Education: Florida State University (B.A.); The Public Theater

Comedy career
- Years active: 2006–present

Stephen Guarino (born November 14, 1975) is an American actor and comedian, known as Sully Patterson on the Jim Carrey-produced Showtime series I'm Dying Up Here (2017–2018) and for his recurring role as Derrick in the ABC comedy series Happy Endings, a character that has since been carried over to the NBC sitcom Marry Me, as well as Connor on the ABC sitcom Dr. Ken.

Discovered by Rosie O'Donnell, he was one of the prominent sketch comedy stars on the groundbreaking Logo TV series The Big Gay Sketch Show (2007–2010) with fellow comedians Kate McKinnon, Erica Ash, Colman Domingo, Jonny McGovern, Julie Goldman, Paolo Andino, Dion Flynn, and Michael Serrato. In 2018, he was nominated for a Daytime Emmy for his role as "Quincy" in the Netflix series EastSiders. He also received the Outfest Best Actor award for his role in the feature film BearCity.

== Early life and education ==
Guarino is originally from Orlando, Florida and was a member of SAK Comedy Lab. He graduated from Florida State University as well as The Public Theater's Shakespeare program. After appearing in numerous Off-Broadway productions, Guarino was a co-creator of the Off-Broadway improv musical The Nuclear Family with fellow members Jimmy Ray Bennett, John Gregorio, and Matthew Loren Cohen. Guarino was later cast on The Big Gay Sketch Show in 2005.

== Career ==
After the success of The Big Gay Sketch Show, he appeared on television shows including Law & Order: Special Victims Unit as well as the films Confessions of a Shopaholic, the BearCity franchise, and I Hate Valentine's Day In 2011, he moved to Los Angeles after receiving a talent deal from CBS.

His first breakout role was on Happy Endings where he played Penny Hartz's (Casey Wilson) over-the-top friend Derrick for three seasons. He also appeared on The Wedding Bells, 'Til Death, The Neighbors, The Comeback, Marry Me, Finding Carter, Jessie, Sofia the First, Superior Donuts, 2 Broke Girls. He played Connor on ABC's Dr. Ken, Quincy on Netflix's EastSiders (Daytime Emmy nomination), and Sully Patterson on Jim Carrey's Showtime drama I'm Dying Up Here.

He has done three network pilots with James Burrows including Me & Mean Margaret, Relatively Happy, and Superior Donuts.

Guarino was to appear in Logan Paul's feature Airplane Mode (2019).

== Directing and producing ==
Guarino was the director of the CBS Diversity Sketch Comedy Showcase in Los Angeles (2017–unknown). Notable alumni include Tiffany Haddish, Kate McKinnon, Fortune Feimster, Justin Hires, Nicole Byer, Nasim Pedrad, John Milhiser.

He previously directed Kate McKinnon's one-woman show Best Actress at the Upright Citizens Brigade. He directed Showgirls: Live in Drag starring RuPaul's Drag Race stars Willam Belli, Detox Icunt, and Vicky Vox.

In 2015, Guarino co-produced and co-wrote a CBS sketch comedy pilot called The Night Crew with Michael Serrato, Steven Borzachillo, Mark Hurtado, and Ryan Noggle David Burtka, and Neil Patrick Harris starring himself, Tiffany Haddish, Fortune Feimster, Jimmy Ray Bennett, and Nico Santos.

== Personal life ==
Guarino is gay.

== Filmography ==
=== Television ===
Year	Title	Role	Notes
2006–2010	The Big Gay Sketch Show	Various	23 episodes
2007	Law & Order: Special Victims Unit	Garrett	Episode: "Haystack"
2007	The Wedding Bells	Ross	Episode: "Wedding from Hell"
2010	'Til Death	Ryan	Episode: "Sell the House"
2011–2020	Happy Endings	Derrick	8 episodes
2012	Hustling	Don Dixon	4 episodes Nominated – Indie Series Award for Best Guest Actor – Drama
2013	The Neighbors	Chad	Episode: "Mother Clubbers"
2013	The Gates	Brett	Pilot
2014	The Comeback	Chateau Host	Episode: "Valerie Makes a Pilot"
2014	Marry Me	Derrick	Episode: "Scary Me"
2014	Finding Carter	Toby	4 episodes
2014	Jessie	James McMillan	Episode: "Snack Attack"
2015	Life's a Drag	DJ Tricky Dicky	Episode: "Retrograde"; Indie Series Award for Best Guest Actor – Comedy
2015	Sofia the First	King Marcus (voice)	Episode: "Minding The Manor"
2015–2018	Sorry, Ari	Marcus	4 episodes
2016	Gay Skit Happens	Various	2 episodes
2016	Me & Mean Margaret	Paul	Pilot
2016–2017	Relatively Happy	Perry	Pilot
2016–2017	Dr. Ken	Connor	9 episodes
2016–2017	Superior Donuts	Brad	Pilot
2016–2017	2 Broke Girls	Richie	Episode: "And the Stalking Dead"
2017–2018	I'm Dying Up Here	"Sully" Patterson	10 episodes
2018	The Strivers	Mark Cicero	Pilot
2018–2019	EastSiders	Quincy	19 episodes Nominated – Indie Series Award for Best Supporting Actor – Drama; Nominated – Daytime Emmy Award for Outstanding Supporting Actor in a Digital Daytime Drama Series
2019–2022	The Goldbergs	Joseph Lynch / Administrator Dean	5 episodes
2021	Kenan	Van Sherman-Willis	1 episode
2021	This Is Us	Kevin's Agent	1 episode
2021	The Sex Lives of College Girls	Sips Manager	3 episodes
2021	Good Trouble	Scott Farrell	8 episodes
2022	Unconventional	Kenny Rogers	Episode: "Apple"
2022–2024	The Really Loud House	Howard McBride	6 episodes
2023	Bookie	Viggy	Episode: "Nepo Bookies"
2025	Gen V	Kyle / The Rememberer	Episode: "Justice Never Forgets"

=== Theatre ===
Year	Title	Role	Notes
2024–2025	Titanique	Ruth DeWitt Bukater	Original West End cast

=== Film ===
Year	Title	Role	Notes
2002	The Year That Trembled	Gilbert Blakely	
2008	The Clique	Vincent	
2008	Confessions of a Shopaholic	Allon	
2009	An Englishman in New York	Demonstrator	
2009	I Hate Valentine's Day	Bill	
2010	BearCity	Brent Richards	Outfest Award for Best Actor
2012	BearCity 2: The Proposal	Brent Richards	
2016	BearCity 3	Brent Richards-Dean	
2016	The Happys	Johnathan	
2018	Airplane Mode	Himself	
2019	Blind Sight	The Security Guard	
2019	American Bistro	Milton Buckner	
2020	Catfish Killer	Bud	
2024	Reagan	Mike Deaver	

== Awards and nominations ==
Year	Work	Organization	Category	Result
2015	Hustling	7th Indie Series Awards	Best Supporting Actor — Drama	Nominated
2015	Life is a Drag	7th Indie Series Awards	Best Guest Actor — Comedy	Won
2018	EastSiders	45th Daytime Creative Arts Emmy Awards	Outstanding Supporting Actor in a Digital Daytime Drama Series	Nominated
