= EastSiders =

- Genre: Dark comedy
- Created by: Kit Williamson
- Written by: Kit Williamson
- Directed by: Kit Williamson
- Starring: Van Hansis; Kit Williamson; Constance Wu; Matthew McKelligon; John Halbach; Brianna Brown
- Country of origin: United States
- Original language: English
- No. of seasons: 4
- No. of episodes: 27

Production
- Executive producers: Kit Williamson; John Halbach
- Producers: Christina J Dodson; Kristyne Elizabeth Fetsic; Jonathan Stahl
- Production location: Silver Lake, Los Angeles
- Running time: 10–14 minutes (season 1); 25-55 minutes (seasons 2–4)

Original release
- Network: YouTube
- Release: December 14, 2012 – October 5, 2015
- Network: Netflix
- Release: November 28, 2017 – December 1, 2019

EastSiders is an American dark comedy web series created by Kit Williamson. It premiered on YouTube on December 14, 2012, and began streaming through Logo TV's website on April 23, 2013. Set in Silver Lake, Los Angeles, the series follows couple Thom (Van Hansis) and Cal (Williamson) as they struggle with infidelity and substance abuse. It also explores the relationship between Kathy (Constance Wu), Cal's best friend, and her boyfriend Ian (John Halbach) as they reach their six-month anniversary, making it Kathy's longest relationship.

The first two episodes of the first season premiered on YouTube, and the subsequent seven episodes were funded by a Kickstarter campaign. On April 2, 2013, it was announced that the series was picked up for distribution through Logo TV's website, and the remainder of the season premiered on April 23, 2013. The second season premiered on September 15, 2015, through Vimeo's on demand service. The series was later sold to Netflix, and the third season premiered November 28, 2017.

Since its release, the series has received numerous accolades, including two Indie Series Awards and several Daytime Emmy Award nominations.

The fourth and final season premiered on December 1, 2019.

== Series overview ==
In Silver Lake, Los Angeles, Cal (Kit Williamson) learns that Thom (Van Hansis), his boyfriend of four years, has been cheating on him with Jeremy (Matthew McKelligon). Though upset, Cal decides that he does not want to end the relationship. However, Cal also cheats with Jeremy. Though he intends to tell Thom about the affair, he does not. At the same time, Cal's best friend Kathy (Constance Wu) and her boyfriend Ian (John Halbach) reach their six-month anniversary, marking the relationship as Kathy's longest but Ian's shortest.

== Cast ==
=== Main characters ===
- Van Hansis as Thom, an aspiring writer and Cal's boyfriend of four years. He cheats on Cal with Jeremy, but he comes to regret it and ends the affair in episode one.
- Kit Williamson as Cal, an aspiring photographer and Thom's boyfriend of four years. He works at an art gallery, which is usually empty. After learning about Thom's affair, he decides not to end the relationship. Though he admits he might never trust Thom again, he accepts it.
- Constance Wu as Kathy (season 1–3), Cal's best friend who lives next door to Cal and Thom. She and Cal went to college together. She has been long distrustful of Thom. Her relationships are short-lived, and her six-month relationship with Ian is the longest-lasting one she has had.
- Matthew McKelligon as Jeremy, with whom Thom and Cal cheat on each other. Though he is not sure what he wants out of his relationships with both men, Jeremy becomes upset that neither Thom nor Cal wish to continue seeing or talking to him. Eventually, he comes to regret his actions and apologizes to both of them. After Thom and Cal's relationship falls apart, he begins a relationship with Thom, only to realize that it is not what he wanted.
- John Halbach as Ian, a landscape architect and Kathy's boyfriend of six months. She describes him as a "hipster" and is the genuine nice guy of the neighborhood.
- Brianna Brown as Hillary (season 2–4), Cal's emotionally unstable sister.

=== Recurring cast ===
- Brea Grant as Bri, Jeremy's lesbian sister, who has been with her partner Vera ("V") for eight years and is raising children. Grant said of Bri, she "has a good head on her shoulders and has made good decisions (unlike some of the other characters on the show)."
- Sean Maher as Paul, owner of the art gallery and Cal's boss, who takes a sexual interest in Cal despite being married for ten years. He was formerly an artist himself, the art gallery is his former workspace, and he tells Cal to consider his hiring as "artistic patronage." Maher stated he was originally meant to appear in only one episode, but the role was later expanded after he began filming.
- Traci Lords as Valerie, Cal's divorced mother who lives in Phoenix. She spends most of her lunch date with Cal and Thom drinking and ordering gins and is said to be "raiding the mini-bar" in the apartment shortly after. She says she would be crushed if Cal and Thom ended their relationship, and even suggests they marry.
- David Blue as David.
- Stephen Guarino as Quincy, a gay party promoter who is friends with the group.
- Willam Belli as Douglas/Gomorrah Ray, an aspiring drag queen and door girl who becomes Quincy's love interest (season 2–4).
- Satya Bhabha as Jared.
- Jake Choi as Clifford (Season 4).
- Aaron Marcotte as Billy (Season 4).
- Bryan Batt as Richard, Cal's father (Season 4).

== Episodes ==
The first two episodes were released through YouTube on December 14, 2012, and December 21, 2012. On April 2, 2013, Logo TV announced that it secured the rights to stream the series. The first two episodes were posted to the network's website on April 19, 2013, with the remaining episodes beginning a weekly release schedule starting April 22, 2013. Wolfe Video acquired worldwide digital and DVD rights to the feature film cut of the first season on January 15, 2014. It was released on DVD and digital download on August 12, 2014. It also became available through iTunes.

The second series premiered on September 15, 2015, with the simultaneous release of its first three episodes on Vimeo's on demand service. At the time, the series would release exclusively through Vimeo until October 3, 2015, on which release on other digital platforms and on DVD.

Season	Episodes	Originally released		
Season	Episodes	First released	Last released	Network
1	9	December 14, 2012	June 24, 2013	YouTube
2	6	September 15, 2015	October 5, 2015	YouTube
3	6	November 28, 2017		Netflix
4	6	December 1, 2019		Netflix

=== Season 1 (2012–13) ===
No. overall	No. in season	Title	Directed by	Written by	Original release date
1	1	"Infidelity"	Kit Williamson	Kit Williamson	December 14, 2012
December 22, 2012 – Cal (Kit Williamson) wakes up to find Thom (Van Hansis) sleeping on the floor. When asked about last night, Cal remembers he said he hated Thom but not much else. They discuss whether or not they wish to end their four-year relationship, and Cal decides he does not. After Thom leaves, Cal invites Kathy (Constance Wu) over. She rants that though she accepted her boyfriend's marriage proposal at a party last night, she only did so because everyone was watching. Thom visits Jeremy (Matthew McKelligon) and has sex with him. Cal tells Kathy about his relationship troubles. Though Kathy points out that Cal might not be able to trust Thom again, Cal muses that he will just have to accept it. She decides to marry her boyfriend. Thom ends his affair with Jeremy and tells Cal he loves him.
2	2	"The Flashback"	Kit Williamson	Kit Williamson	December 21, 2012
December 21, 2012 – The group attends an End of the World party. Cal is upset that the narrator in Thom's story "meditates on cheating on his frigid shrew of a boyfriend for fifteen pages." Thom insists that it is entirely fictional and has nothing to do with their relationship. Kathy is upset that her boyfriend Ian (John Halbach) did not get her a gift for their six month anniversary. He buys a ring from a girl at the party. When he tries to give it to her, he drops it, making it seem like he is proposing. To his horror, she enthusiastically accepts. Cal gets drunk and becomes upset with Thom. Jeremy shows up at the party, causing Cal to tell Thom he hates him and run away.
3	3	"Didn’t See That Coming"	Kit Williamson	Kit Williamson	April 22, 2013
January 5, 2013 – Much of the tension in Cal and Thom's relationship is gone. However, Cal uses Thom's phone to get Jeremy's address. He confronts Jeremy. Jeremy learns that Thom is not cheating on him with Cal but rather Thom is cheating on Cal with Jeremy. Jeremy offers Cal drinks. Cal becomes drunk and sleeps with Jeremy. Kathy is relieved to learn that Ian did not intend to propose to her and does not want to marry her. Cal intends to tell Thom about the affair, but he does not.
4	4	"Fix the Problem"	Kit Williamson	Kit Williamson	April 30, 2013
April 30, 2013 – Cal and Thom's relationship has returned to its loving normal, however, Jeremy continues to text Thom. Kathy has morning sickness. Cal and Thom have lunch will Cal's mom, Val (Traci Lords), who states she will be crushed if the pair break up. Cal runs into Jeremy at the art gallery where Cal works. Jeremy offers to be Cal's friend, but Cal rebuffs him. Seeing this, Cal's boss Paul (Sean Maher) reassures him in an overly friendly manner.
5	5	"Pot"	Kit Williamson	Kit Williamson	May 7, 2013
May 7, 2013 – Thom tells Jeremy to stop calling. Jeremy tells his sister (Brea Grant) that he is unsure what he wants from Cal and Thom, but he is upset neither want to talk to him. Paul asks Cal out to lunch but is interrupted by call from Kathy. Paul allows Cal to leave work early to visit her. To Kathy's dismay, she is pregnant. Cal agrees to pick her up from the abortion clinic. She advises him to leave Thom. Quincy (Stephen Guarino) arranges to have drinks with Ian while Kathy is at the clinic. Cal asks Thom if he loved Jeremy. Though Thom did not, he liked being with Jeremy because it made him feel like a different person. Cal knows what he means. Thom admits Jeremy has been calling him and that he had sex with Jeremy after Cal learned of the affair. He asks if Cal can forgive him, and Cal says that he will try.
6	6	"Secret Slip"	Kit Williamson	Kit Williamson	May 14, 2013
May 14, 2013 – Paul and Cal celebrate selling prints of Cal's photo of Thom. Quincy drops Kathy off at the clinic. Jeremy visits Thom at the bar where Thom works and gives Thom two hand-written apologies: one for Thom, one for Cal. Paul and Cal get progressively more drunk, and they kiss. Quincy accidentally tells Ian that Kathy is getting an abortion. Cal does not come to pick up Kathy, and she asks Thom to come instead. Paul and Cal have sex. Cal is shocked to learn that Paul has been married for ten years. Kathy calls Cal, and Thom overhears that Cal had sex with Paul. Ian decides that he feels too young to be father and is glad that Kathy got an abortion. Kathy, disoriented, tells Thom she is afraid and wonders if she is a good person. Ian gets home before Kathy and asks to talk to her. Cal stumbles home, drunk.
7	7	"Moving On, Moving Out"	Kit Williamson	Kit Williamson	May 21, 2013
May 31, 2013 – Cal and Thom are moving out and will no longer live together. Ian tells Kathy that he does not care about her and laughs when she asks if he wants to date her. Jeremy asks Thom to move in with him. Kathy, in tears, visits Cal. Cal tells her that Thom has been seeing Jeremy to be vengeful. Angry that Cal rejects her reassurances and refuses to talk about Ian, she yells at him for never apologizing for leaving her at the clinic and for complaining about how unfair Thom is when Thom is only retaliating to Cal's infidelity. She accuses Cal of being too cowardly to end the relationship and so, by cheating on Thom, forced Thom to end it.
8	8	"One Year Earlier"	Kit Williamson	Kit Williamson	May 28, 2013
June 1, 2012 – Cal and Thom have moved in together. Kathy visits and tells them that her date last night went well. She likes him, and she has high hopes for their future relationship. She invites her date over to help with the unpacking, and it is Ian. She invites Ian to spend the night with her. Though thinking Ian is a "nice guy," Thom does not believe Ian and Kathy's relationship will work out. Cal has Thom promise that their relationship will be successful. Thom promises.
9	9	"Decisions"	Kit Williamson	Kit Williamson	June 24, 2013
June 2, 2013 – Thom learns that Jeremy bought prints of Cal's photos of Thom. Kathy forgives Cal for treating her terribly the previous night. Thom is upset about the prints. Jeremy decides that this is not what he wants and ends the relationship. Kathy tells Ian that she likes him and apologizes for being self-absorbed. Because she feels so much, she tends to forget that other people feel things too and wants to know what Ian feels. He admits that he misses her and that he still feels angry when he sees her. They agree that, even though he agreed with her decision, she should have told him before getting the abortion. They also agree to be more open. Cal and Thom apologize to one another. They both admit that they still love another and that they are scared for their future.

=== Season 2 (2015) ===
No. overall	No. in season	Title	Directed by	Written by	Original release date
10	1	"Weirder Than Normal"	Kit Williamson	Kit Williamson	September 15, 2015
11	2	"Sodom (And Gommorah)"	Kit Williamson	Kit Williamson	September 15, 2015
12	3	"Sex Therapy"	Kit Williamson	Kit Williamson	September 15, 2015
13	4	"Thick Like a Lotion"	Kit Williamson	Kit Williamson	October 5, 2015
14	5	"Open Bar"	Kit Williamson	Kit Williamson	October 5, 2015
15	6	"Evolving"	Kit Williamson	Kit Williamson	October 5, 2015

=== Season 3 (2017) ===
No. overall	No. in season	Title	Directed by	Written by	Original release date
16	1	"Priscilla"	Kit Williamson	Kit Williamson	November 28, 2017
17	2	"Goodbye to All That Shit"	Kit Williamson	Kit Williamson	November 28, 2017
18	3	"Thelma and Louise"	Kit Williamson	Kit Williamson	November 28, 2017
19	4	"Cats"	Kit Williamson	Kit Williamson	November 28, 2017
20	5	"Our Own Private Idaho"	Kit Williamson	Kit Williamson	November 28, 2017
21	6	"East of Eden"	Kit Williamson	Kit Williamson	November 28, 2017

=== Season 4 (2019) ===
No. overall	No. in season	Title	Directed by	Written by	Original release date
22	1	"A Relationship Like That"	Kit Williamson	Kit Williamson	December 1, 2019
23	2	"Going Viral"	Kit Williamson	Kit Williamson	December 1, 2019
24	3	"Back East"	Kit Williamson	Kit Williamson	December 1, 2019
25	4	"Pillow Talk"	Kit Williamson	Kit Williamson	December 1, 2019
26	5	"Both Sides Now"	Kit Williamson	Kit Williamson	December 1, 2019
27	6	"Always Upwards"	Kit Williamson	Kit Williamson	December 1, 2019

== Production ==
After the initial two episodes aired, the remaining seven were funded through crowdfunding via Kickstarter. The campaign began on January 7, 2013 and met its goal $15,000 four days later on January 11, 2013. The campaign closed on February 6, 2013, with $25,785 raised. The series launched a second Kickstarter campaign to fund the second season on April 14, 2014, with a goal of $125,000; the campaign closed on May 19, 2014, with $153,170 raised.

The series is filmed on location in Silver Lake, Los Angeles.

== Reception ==
After the release of the first two episodes, The Daily Dot described the series as "charming, sharply written, and well-acted," specifically praising Guarino and Wu, and felt that the future of the series was "promising." Next Magazine also felt that the first two episodes were "top-notch", especially as it noted "the demographic [depicting the lives of young gay men] is still pretty unrepresented when it comes to well-produced series," and included the first season Kickstarter among those it recommended for backing. IndieWire recommended the series, because it was "giving Logo the kind of soap opera they should have on-air." NewMediaRockstars felt that the first season was met positively because fans "were eager for a quality series that portrayed realistic LGBT relationships without making sexual orientation the characters' defining feature."

=== Awards and nominations ===
The first season was nominated for a 2013 Satellite Award for Original Short-Form Program. LA Weekly awarded the series a 2013 Web Award for Best Web Series – Drama. It won the 2013 Indie Series Award for Best Ensemble and was nominated for five others. In 2016, EastSiders received a Daytime Emmy Award nomination for Outstanding Digital Daytime Drama Series, and Hansis was nominated for Outstanding Actor in a Digital Daytime Drama Series for portraying Thom. The series also received ten Indie Series Award nominations in 2016, including Best Web Series – Drama, and won for Best Ensemble – Drama.

Year	Award	Category	Nominee(s)	Result	Ref.
2014	5th Indie Series Awards	Best Directing – Drama	Kit Williamson	Nominated	
2014	5th Indie Series Awards	Best Lead Actor – Drama	Van Hansis as Thom	Nominated	
2014	5th Indie Series Awards	Best Supporting Actor – Drama	Matthew McKelligon as Jeremy	Nominated	
2014	5th Indie Series Awards	Best Supporting Actress – Drama	Constance Wu as Kathy	Nominated	
2014	5th Indie Series Awards	Best Ensemble – Drama		Won	
2014	5th Indie Series Awards	Best Guest Star – Drama	Traci Lords as Val	Nominated	
2016	43rd Daytime Creative Arts Emmy Awards	Outstanding Digital Daytime Drama Series	Kit Williamson, John Halbach, Chrissy Dodson, Laura Roeder, Inuka Bacote, Neal Baer, Kalvin Brewer-Yu, Jim Klever-Weis, Jake Weinraub, Beth Wheatley	Nominated	
2016	43rd Daytime Creative Arts Emmy Awards	Outstanding Actor in a Digital Daytime Drama Series	Van Hansis as Thom	Nominated	
2016	7th Indie Series Awards	Best Web Series — Drama		Nominated	
2016	7th Indie Series Awards	Best Writing — Drama	Kit Williamson	Nominated	
2016	7th Indie Series Awards	Best Lead Actor — Drama	Van Hansis as Thom	Nominated	
2016	7th Indie Series Awards	Best Lead Actor — Drama	Kit Williamson as Cal	Nominated	
2016	7th Indie Series Awards	Best Lead Actress — Drama	Brianna Brown as Hillary	Nominated	
2016	7th Indie Series Awards	Best Supporting Actor — Drama	Stephen Guarino as Quincy	Nominated	
2016	7th Indie Series Awards	Best Guest Actor — Drama	Willam Belli as Douglas/Gomorrah Ray	Nominated	
2016	7th Indie Series Awards	Best Guest Actress — Drama	Constance Wu as Kathy	Nominated	
2016	7th Indie Series Awards	Best Ensemble — Drama		Won	
2016	7th Indie Series Awards	Best Editing	Larissa Brantner James and Kris Fitzgerald	Nominated	
2018	45th Daytime Creative Arts Emmy Awards	Outstanding Digital Daytime Drama Series	Kit Williamson, John Halbach, Larissa James, Jen Sarabok, Michael Saripkin, Van Hansis, Aydrian J. Howard, Susen McBeth, Jeff Sarabock, Inuka Bacote-Capiga, Brea Grant	Nominated	
2018	45th Daytime Creative Arts Emmy Awards	Outstanding Lead Actor in a Digital Daytime Drama Series	Van Hansis as Thom	Nominated	
2018	45th Daytime Creative Arts Emmy Awards	Outstanding Supporting Actor in a Digital Daytime Drama Series	Stephen Guarino as Quincy	Nominated	
2018	45th Daytime Creative Arts Emmy Awards	Outstanding Supporting Actor in a Digital Daytime Drama Series	John Halbach as Ian	Nominated	
2018	45th Daytime Creative Arts Emmy Awards	Outstanding Writing in a Digital Drama Series	Kit Williamson	Nominated	
2018	45th Daytime Creative Arts Emmy Awards	Outstanding Directing in a Digital Drama Series	Kit Williamson	Nominated	
2020	47th Daytime Emmy Awards	Outstanding Digital Daytime Drama Series	Kit Williamson, Larissa James, Inuka Bacote-Capiga, Austin Robert Bales, Thomas Lee Bottom, Aydrian J. Howard, Jeff Sarabock, Jen Sarabok, Rhet Topham, Delton Valentine	Nominated	
2020	47th Daytime Emmy Awards	Outstanding Supporting Actor for a Digital Daytime Drama Series	Willam Belli as Douglas/Gomorrah Ray	Nominated	
2020	47th Daytime Emmy Awards	Outstanding Supporting Actor for a Digital Daytime Drama Series	Leith M. Burke as Derrick	Nominated	
2020	47th Daytime Emmy Awards	Outstanding Guest Performer for a Digital Daytime Drama Series	Lin Shaye as Diane	Won	
2020	47th Daytime Emmy Awards	Outstanding Writing for a Digital Drama Series	Kit Williamson	Nominated	
2020	47th Daytime Emmy Awards	Outstanding Casting for a Drama or Digital Drama Series	Paul Ruddy	Won	
2020	47th Daytime Emmy Awards	Outstanding Costume Design for a Drama or Digital Drama Series	Trevor Dow	Nominated	
2020	47th Daytime Emmy Awards	Outstanding Makeup	Mary Chip, Robert Hensley, Willam Belli	Nominated	
