= Anacostia (web series) =

- Season 1 main title
- Created by: Anthony Anderson
- Written by: Anthony Anderson
- Directed by: Anthony Anderson
- Starring: Anthony Anderson; Marion Akpan; Christopher Bair; Martha Byrne; Tamieka Chavis; Pasha Diallo; Kena Hodges; Elizabeth Hubbard; Walter Maxfield Jones; William Lash; Tandrea Parrott; Melan Perez
- Country of origin: United States
- Original language: English
- No. of seasons: 6
- No. of episodes: 60

Production
- Executive producers: Anthony Anderson; Martha Byrne
- Production company: Southeast Boy Productions

Original release
- Network: Amazon Video S5-present; YouTube S1-S5
- Release: October 15, 2009 – present

Anacostia is a soap opera web series that premiered on October 15, 2009 on YouTube. It was created by Anthony A. Anderson (not to be confused with the actor of the same name), who also stars in, writes, produces, and directs the series. Anacostia chronicles the drama among residents of the titular community in Washington, D. C. Guest star Martha Byrne later became an executive producer on the series.

The series was nominated for a 2022 Primetime Emmy Award for Outstanding Actor In A Short Form Comedy or Drama Series (Anthony Anderson). Anthony Anderson became the first actor in history to be nominated for both a Daytime and Primetime Emmy for the same role.

The series was also nominated for a 2015 Daytime Emmy Award for Outstanding New Approaches Drama Series, and Martha Byrne won a Daytime Emmy the same year for Outstanding Performer in a New Approaches Drama Series for her performance as Alexis Jordan. Elizabeth Hubbard was nominated in 2016 for a Daytime Emmy Award for Outstanding Actress in a Digital Daytime Drama Series for her role as Eva Montgomery, and Anthony Anderson made history becoming the first African American to be nominated in 2017 for a Daytime Emmy Award for Outstanding Lead Actor in a Digital Daytime Drama Series for his role as Sean Williams-Grey. In 2017, actress Jennifer Bassey received the show's fifth nomination, in the Outstanding Guest Performer digital category. Anacostia has the most wins at the Indie Series Awards.

In 2018, Anacostia was picked up by Amazon Video for a multi year run on the streaming platform.

== Cast ==
- Anthony Anderson as Sean (2009–present)
- William Lash as Scott (2009–present)
- Tamieka Chavis as Mia (2009–present)
- Marion Akpan as Nancy (2009–present)
- Pasha Diallo as Dominique (2009–present)
- Kena Hodges as Nicole (2009–present)
- Christopher Bair as Cliff (2009–present)
- Antonio Harrison, Jr. as Que (2010–present)
- Kelvin Terrell as Ray (2011–present)
- Martha Byrne as Alexis Jordan/JoAnne Edwards (2011–present)
- India Doy as Jennifer (2011–present)
- Tandrea Parrott as Desiree' (2010–present)
- Rolfini Whidbee as Maurice (2011–present)
- Luis Valdez as Eric (2012–present)
- Alexis Robinson Smith as Melissa (2014–present)
- Tremayne Norris as Carlos (2014–present)
- Melan Perez as Salina (2014–present)
- Elizabeth Hubbard as Eva Montgomery (2015–present)
- Jennifer Bassey as Beverley Newman (2017–present)
- Lauren B. Martin as Chevonne (2018–present)
- Walter Maxfield Jones as Michael (2009–present)
- Chanté Bowser as Salina (2009–2012)
- Jermaine McNeal as Andrew (2009–2011)
- Kareem Petteway as Creeko (2009)
- Rabon Hutcherson as Andre (2009–)
- Deidra Taylor as Lashawn ("Cherry") (2011–2013)
- Darnell Lamont Walker as Julian (season 2–3)
- Carey Green as Jack (2010–present)
- Giselle Gant as Madison (2011–2013)
- Darnerien McCants as Cyrus (2011–2016)
- Tye Frazier as Brian (2011–2012)
- Tiana Harris as Ashley (2011–2012)
- Yohance Fleming as Chauncey (2011)
- Ashleigh McGill as April (2014)
- Dai Boggan as Tim (2015)
- Chris Deloatch as Clay (2015)
- Lauren Dorsey as Donatella
- Devin Nikki Thomas as Tracee James (2017–Present)

== Series overview ==
Series Summary
Season	# of Episodes	First Aired	Last Aired
1	10	2009	2010
2	10	2010	2011
3	10	2011	2012
4	10	2014	2015
5	10	2015	2017
6	10	2018	2021

== Episodes ==
Season 1
No. In Series	No. In Season	Episode Title	Written By	Directed By	Viewers (in thousands)
1	1	Covet Thy Neighbor	Anthony Anderson	Anthony Anderson	0.032
2	2	Breaking The Surface	Anthony Anderson	Anthony Anderson	0.015
3	3	Beware of The Fine Print	Anthony Anderson	Anthony Anderson	0.013
4	4	Always Bet on Black (Part 1)	Anthony Anderson	Anthony Anderson	0.011
5	5	Always Bet on Black (Part 2)	Anthony Anderson	Anthony Anderson	0.017
6	6	L.O.V.E.	Anthony Anderson	Anthony Anderson	0.011
7	7	Bad Girl	Anthony Anderson	Anthony Anderson	0.011
8	8	You've Got The Look	Anthony Anderson	Anthony Anderson	0.009
9	9	The End Is Coming	Anthony Anderson	Anthony Anderson	0.013
10	10	Arrivals & Departures	Anthony Anderson	Anthony Anderson	0.012

Season 2
No. In Series	No. In Season	Episode Title	Written By	Directed By	Viewers (in thousands)
11	1	Scar Tissue	Anthony Anderson	Anthony Anderson	0.012
12	2	What Will I Tell My Heart?	Anthony Anderson	Anthony Anderson	0.010
13	3	Hello Like Before	Anthony Anderson	Anthony Anderson	0.042
14	4	The Wheels on The Bus	Anthony Anderson	Anthony Anderson	0.012
15	5	Checks and Balances	Anthony Anderson	Anthony Anderson	0.011
16	6	One For The Road	Anthony Anderson	Anthony Anderson	0.009
17	7	A House Is Not a Home	Anthony Anderson	Anthony Anderson	0.010
18	8	Business as Usual	Anthony Anderson	Anthony Anderson	0.008
19	9	Sins of The Past	Anthony Anderson	Anthony Anderson	0.010
20	10	And Justice For All	Anthony Anderson	Anthony Anderson	0.011

Season 3
No. In Series	No. In Season	Episode Title	Written By	Directed By	Viewers (in thousands)
21	1	Where Do We Go From Here	Anthony Anderson	Anthony Anderson	0.013
22	2	Only In My Dreams	Anthony Anderson	Anthony Anderson	0.034
23	3	Sign Your Name	Anthony Anderson	Anthony Anderson	0.024
24	4	Helping Hands	Anthony Anderson	Anthony Anderson	0.023
25	5	The Bigger They Are	Anthony Anderson	Anthony Anderson	0.028
26	6	Show and Tell	Anthony Anderson	Anthony Anderson	0.023
27	7	The Gangs All Here	Anthony Anderson	Anthony Anderson	0.021
28	8	The Power of Goodbye	Anthony Anderson	Anthony Anderson	0.038
29	9	Break-up To Make-up	Anthony Anderson	Anthony Anderson	0.028
30	10	Till Death Do Us Part	Anthony Anderson	Anthony Anderson	0.025

Season 4
No. In Series	No. In Season	Episode Title	Written By	Directed By	Viewers (in thousands)
31	1	Don't Leave Me This Way	Anthony Anderson	Anthony Anderson	0.015
32	2	Once Upon a Time	Anthony Anderson	Anthony Anderson	0.016
33	3	Never Say Never	Anthony Anderson	Anthony Anderson	0.014
34	4	What Happens In Vegas	Anthony Anderson	Anthony Anderson	0.010
35	5	R.S.V.P	Anthony Anderson	Anthony Anderson	0.007
36	6	Do Unto Others	Anthony Anderson	Anthony Anderson	0.007
37	7	Choices	Anthony Anderson	Anthony Anderson	0.006
38	8	What a Fool Believes	Anthony Anderson	Anthony Anderson	0.006
39	9	When The Bough Breaks	Anthony Anderson	Anthony Anderson	0.007
40	10	Proxy	Anthony Anderson	Anthony Anderson	0.008

Season 5
No. In Series	No. In Season	Episode Title	Written By	Directed By	Viewers (in thousands)
41	1	You Again	Anthony Anderson & Martha Byrne	Anthony Anderson & Martha Byrne	0.013
42	2	Why Me (Part 1)	Anthony Anderson & Martha Byrne	Anthony Anderson & Martha Byrne	0.010
43	3	Why Me (Part 2)	Anthony Anderson & Martha Byrne	Anthony Anderson & Martha Byrne	0.006
44	4	I Can See You	Anthony Anderson	Anthony Anderson	0.007
45	5	Road Kill	Anthony Anderson	Anthony Anderson	0.004
46	6	Speak No Evil	Anthony Anderson	Anthony Anderson	0.003
47	7	The Knock	Anthony Anderson	Anthony Anderson	0.003
48	8	Call It By Its Name	Anthony Anderson	Anthony Anderson	0.002
49	9	Lost and Found	Anthony Anderson & Martha Byrne	Anthony Anderson & Martha Byrne	0.002
50	10	Confessions	Anthony Anderson & Martha Byrne	Anthony Anderson & Martha Byrne	0.004

Season 6
No. In Series	No. In Season	Episode Title	Written By	Directed By	Viewers (in thousands)
51	1	Aftermath	Anthony Anderson	Anthony Anderson	0.010
52	2	Like Father, Like Son	Anthony Anderson	Anthony Anderson	0.008
53	3	15 Minutes	Anthony Anderson	Anthony Anderson	0.008
54	4	One Wish	Anthony Anderson	Anthony Anderson	
55	5	Man In The Mirror	Anthony Anderson	Anthony Anderson	
56	6	The Life Of A Liar	Anthony Anderson	Anthony Anderson	
57	7	Let Me Love You	Anthony Anderson	Anthony Anderson	
58	8	Fourth Of July	Anthony Anderson	Anthony Anderson	
59	9	Secrets, Lies & Rollercoaster Rides	Anthony Anderson	Anthony Anderson	
60	10	Stormy Weather	Anthony Anderson	Anthony Anderson	

== Production ==
Anacostia was created in 2009 by Anderson, who also writes, executive produces and stars in the series. Byrne serves as executive producer. Lora Lee, Jamie Misiak and Alexis Robinson Smith are among the series' line producers. Marion Akpan, Christopher Bair, Pasha Diallo, India Doy-Young, Antonio Harrison Jr., Kena Hodges, William Lash, Rolfini Whidbee, and Spencer Bruttig serve as producers. Previous producers include Fritz Brekeller, the seasons 1-5 supervising producer, Tommy Zamberlan, as the seasons 1-5 Senior Producer, and Benjamin Bryant as co-executive producer of seasons 1-5.

Byrne, known for her longtime role on the defunct CBS soap opera As the World Turns, joined the series in the role of high-powered madame Alexis Jordan in 2011. In September 2015, Soap Opera Digest reported that Byrne's former As the World Turns co-star Elizabeth Hubbard would also appear on Anacostia as Eva Montgomery, in scenes directed and co-written by Byrne.

In early 2021, after an 18 month production hiatus, Spencer Bruttig was added to the team as the show's Cinematographer and producer.

The show has been photographed using RED, Sony and Blackmagic cinema cameras.

Over the series' successive seasons, Anderson has attempted to address a number of social issues through the series soap operatic lens, including realistic takes on mental illness, incest, male-male rape, and the real-life gentrification of the iconic D.C. neighborhood.

== Awards and recognition ==
Anacostia was nominated for a 2022 Primetime Emmy Award for Outstanding Actor In A Short Form Comedy or Drama Series (Anthony Anderson).

Anacostia was also nominated for a 2015 Daytime Emmy Award for Outstanding New Approaches Drama Series, and Martha Byrne won a Daytime Emmy the same year for Outstanding Performer in a New Approaches Drama Series for her performance as Alexis Jordan. Elizabeth Hubbard was nominated in 2016 for a Daytime Emmy Award for Outstanding Actress in a Digital Daytime Drama Series for her role as Eva Montgomery. In 2017, Anthony Anderson was nominated for a Daytime Emmy Award for Outstanding Lead Actor in a Digital Daytime Drama Series for his role as Sean Williams-Grey. Jennifer Bassey was nominated in 2018 for Outstanding Guest Performer in a Digital Daytime Drama Series for her portrayal of Beverly Newman.

To date, the series has won fourteen Indie Series Awards, and has been nominated for several more. Anthony Anderson holds the record for most Acting Nominations (18) and is also the leader for overall Nominations (26) at the Indie Series Awards.

Year	Award	Category	Individual	Result	Ref.
2010	1st Indie Soap Awards	Best Ensemble		Won	
2011	2nd Indie Soap Awards	Outstanding Lead Actor	Anthony Anderson	Won	
2011	2nd Indie Soap Awards	Breakthrough Performance	Pasha Diallo	Won	
2012	3rd Indie Soap Awards	Best Guest Appearance (Drama)	Martha Byrne	Won	
2012	3rd Indie Soap Awards	Best Writing (Drama)	Anthony Anderson	Won	
2013	4th Indie Soap Awards	Best Supporting Actress (Drama)	Pasha Diallo	Won	
2015	42nd Daytime Creative Arts Emmy Awards	Outstanding New Approaches Drama Series		Nominated	
2015	42nd Daytime Creative Arts Emmy Awards	Outstanding Performer in a New Approaches Drama Series	Martha Byrne	Won	
2015	6th Indie Series Awards	Best Ensemble (Drama)		Won	
2016	43rd Daytime Creative Arts Emmy Awards	Outstanding Actress in a Digital Daytime Drama Series	Elizabeth Hubbard	Nominated	
2016	7th Indie Series Awards	Best Lead Actress (Drama)	Tamieka Chavis	Nominated	
2016	7th Indie Series Awards	Best Supporting Actress (Drama)	Tia Dae	Nominated	
2016	7th Indie Series Awards	Best Guest Actress (Drama)	Elizabeth Hubbard	Nominated	
2016	7th Indie Series Awards	Best Ensemble (Drama)		Nominated	
2017
2017	44th Daytime Creative Arts Emmy Awards	Outstanding Lead Actor in a Digital Daytime Drama Series	Anthony Anderson as Sean Williams-Grey	Nominated	
2017	8th Indie Series Awards	Best Lead Actor (Drama)	Anthony Anderson	Nominated	
2017	8th Indie Series Awards	Best Supporting Actress (Drama)	Marion A. Akpan	Nominated	
2017	8th Indie Series Awards	Best Guest Actor (Drama)	Tremayne Norris	Won	
2017	8th Indie Series Awards	Best Guest Actress (Drama)	Elizabeth Hubbard	Nominated	
2017	8th Indie Series Awards	Best Ensemble (Drama)		Nominated	
2017	8th Indie Series Awards	Best Makeup	Lora Lee	Nominated	
2018	9th Indie Series Awards	Best Drama		Nominated	
		Best Lead Actor (Drama)	Anthony Anderson	Nominated	
		Best Supporting Actor (Drama)	Wil Lash	Won	
		Best Guest Actress (Drama)	Dee Freeman	Nominated	
		Best Guest Actress (Drama)	Jennifer Bassey	Nominated	
		Best Guest Actress (Drama)	Judi Blair	Nominated	
		Best Guest Actor (Drama)	Tremayne Norris	Nominated	
	45th Daytime Creative Arts Emmy Awards	Outstanding Guest Performer in a Digital Daytime Drama Series	Jennifer Bassey	Nominated	
2019	10th Indie Series Awards	Best Guest Actress (Drama)	Lauren B. Martin	Won	
	46th Daytime Creative Arts Emmy Awards	Outstanding Supporting Actor in a Digital Daytime Drama Series	Wil Lash	Nominated	
2022	74th Primetime Creative Arts Emmy Awards	Outstanding Actor in a Short Form Comedy or Drama Series	Anthony A. Anderson	Nominated	

In December 2010, Anderson was named by We Love Soaps as one of the 15 Most Fascinating People of 2010.

In 2017, Gothamist Washington D.C. affiliate DCist named Anacostia "one of the best," in an article highlighting series set in the Washington D.C. area.

== Gallery ==
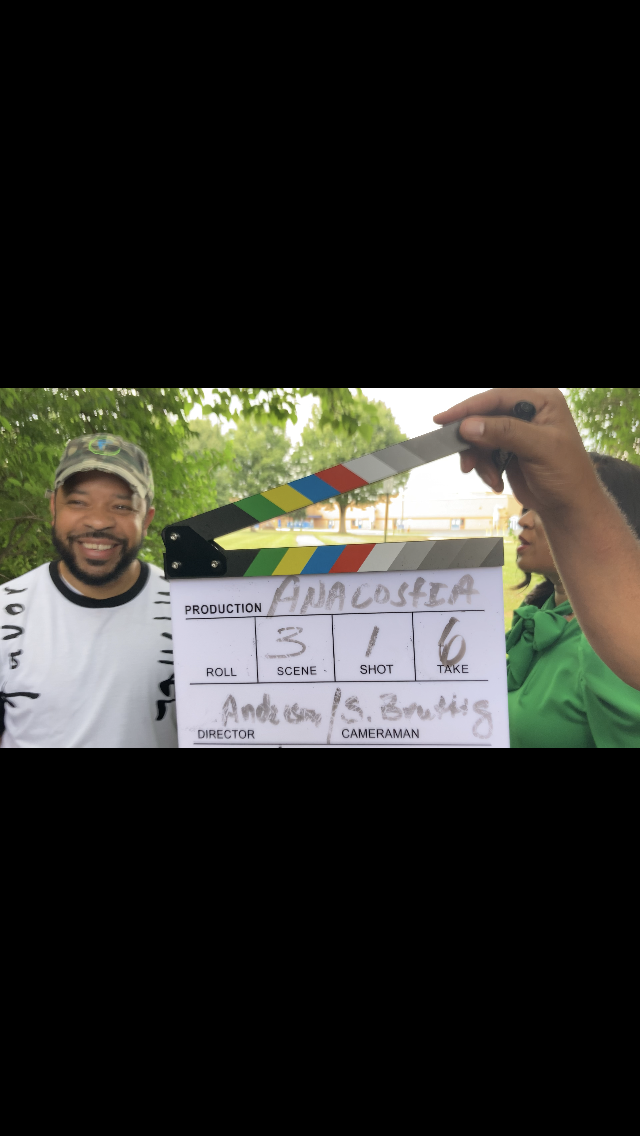
