= Alicia Minshew =

American actress (born 1974)

- Born: May 28, 1974 (age 52); Plantation, Florida, U.S.
- Occupation: Actress
- Years active: 1999–present
- Spouse: Richie Herschenfeld (m. 2008)
- Children: 1

Alicia Minshew (born May 28, 1974) is an American actress. She is best known for portraying Kendall Hart on the daytime drama All My Children.

== Early life and career ==
Minshew was born in Plantation, Florida. Her mother is of Italian descent. Having aspirations to become an actress, Minshew set out for the career path some time after graduating from South Fork High School in Stuart, Florida.

In November 2001, Minshew landed the role of Kendall Hart on the daytime drama All My Children and began filming the following month, after the character's seven-year absence from the soap opera following the exit of Sarah Michelle Gellar, who had previously portrayed the character. Debuting in the January 8, 2002, episode, Minshew played the role of Kendall until the series finale on September 23, 2011. She reprised the role in 2013 during its brief revival. In 2004 and 2005, Minshew portrayed Kendall in brief appearances on the daytime drama One Life to Live as part of a baby-swap storyline.

In 2009, Minshew gave birth to her first child and went on maternity leave right as All My Children relocated production to Los Angeles.

In August 2012, Minshew was cast as the lead in the film, Desires of the Heart which began filming in Savannah, Georgia. In the new film directed by James Kicklighter, Minshew plays a Georgia artist who falls in love with an Indian psychiatrist and follows him back to his homeland, where his parents have arranged a marriage with another woman.

From 2013 to 2014, Minshew played Angelica Caruso on the soap opera web series Tainted Dreams. In 2014, Minshew played New York City reporter Sara Preston in the soap opera web series Beacon Hill. She was nominated for a 2015 Daytime Emmy Award for Outstanding Performer in a New Approaches Drama Series for the role.

In 2016, Alicia Minshew wrapped taping of the musical TV faith-based series "Wholly Broken." The actress plays Kim and described the character as, "The character I play, however, is not a stretch from my soap days! She may be yet another one you love to hate. I play Kim, the self absorbed, headstrong, somewhat unhappy lawyer wife of Tom (the lead character). There is some serious conflict in their life and marriage. You will see how it all plays out. It was a fun role to play. I had a blast with Tom."

== Personal life ==
In October 2008, Minshew married Richie Herschenfeld, a New York City restaurant owner who is also the best friend of actor Thorsten Kaye, her long time on-screen husband. She is close friends with co-star Rebecca Budig. Minshew and her husband welcomed the birth of their daughter Willow Lenora Herschenfeld on November 4, 2009

== Awards and nominations ==
List of acting awards and nominations
Year	Award	Category	Title	Result	Ref.
2003	Soap Opera Digest Award	Outstanding Newcomer	All My Children	Nominated	
2005	Soap Opera Digest Award	Outstanding Supporting Actress	All My Children	Nominated	
2009	Daytime Emmy Award	Outstanding Supporting Actress in a Drama Series	All My Children	Nominated	
2011	Daytime Emmy Award	Outstanding Lead Actress in a Drama Series	All My Children	Nominated	
2014	Hoboken International Film Festival	Best Supporting Actress – Feature Film	Desires of the Heart	Nominated	
2014	Indie Series Award	Best Lead Actress – Drama	Tainted Dreams	Nominated	
2015	Daytime Emmy Award	Outstanding Performer in a New Approaches Drama Series	Beacon Hill	Nominated	
