= Terri Ivens =

American actress and author

- Born: Theresa Lynn Ann Evelyn Ivens; June 23, 1967 (age 57); Newport Beach, California, U.S.
- Occupations: Actress; Author
- Years active: 1987–present
- Spouse: Mark Osgood (m. 2004; div. 2013)
- Children: 1

Theresa Lynn Ann Evelyn Ivens (born June 23, 1967) is an American actress and author. She is best known for her roles as Simone Torres in the soap opera All My Children (2001–2007) and Orchid in the digital series The Bay (2012–2020), the latter of which earned her a nomination for the Daytime Emmy Award for Outstanding Supporting Actress in a Digital Daytime Drama Series in 2018.

== Personal life ==
Ivens was born in Newport Beach, California on Friday June 23, 1967 and raised in Reno, Nevada. She was engaged to baseball first baseman, David Segui, but they broke off the engagement in 2003. She married Mark Osgood on July 2, 2004, but in 2013, Ivens revealed that she is divorced. Their daughter, Kiana, was born on October 9, 2004.

Ivens is also a major sports fan. Her favorite teams include the San Francisco 49ers, the Los Angeles Lakers and the San Antonio Spurs. She enjoys skiing, whitewater rafting and golf. Other non-sports related hobbies include creative writing and poetry, photography and arts & crafts.

== Career ==
Her feature film credits include; Jimmy Hollywood with Joe Pesci, Marked for Death with Steven Seagal, and Piranhaconda. Her television credits include roles in The Barefoot Executive, with Jason London, There Was a Little Boy, with Scott Bairstow, and Breast Men. She played Debbie Baxter in the TV series Wake, Rattle, and Roll. She also had guest appearances in Boy Meets World, Coach, Melrose Place, Baywatch, Married... with Children and Highway to Heaven. She has also done voice work for the classic Lucas Arts adventure game, Grim Fandango, as Lupe.

She released her debut novel, The Buzz: Pointing Fingers, in late 2014.
