= Mary Beth Evans =

American television actress

- Born: March 7, 1961 (age 65); Pasadena, California, U.S.
- Occupation: Actress
- Years active: 1982–present
- Spouse: Dr. Michael Schwartz (m. 1985)
- Children: 3

Mary Beth Evans (born March 7, 1961) is an American television actress, known for her role as Kayla Brady on the NBC daytime soap Days of Our Lives, including her role as Katherine Bell on the ABC daytime soap General Hospital, and her role as Sierra Estaban on the CBS daytime soap As the World Turns.

== Career ==
Evans is most famous for portraying Kayla Brady on the NBC soap opera Days of Our Lives from 1986 to 1992, 2006 to 2009, and 2010 to present. In the 1980s, her character became half of the supercouple Steve and Kayla, with Steve "Patch" Johnson played by Stephen Nichols. In regard to Steve and Kayla’s first wedding, which was one of the biggest in “Days’” history, Evans remarked, “I think it was number one? And that wedding was just so extravagant. It was outside, which was a big deal on a daytime show. It was beautiful.” Evans left the show in 1992 but returned (with Nichols) on June 12, 2006 after a fourteen-year absence. In 2009, Evans and Nichols were written off Days of Our Lives. Evans returned in 2010 and has appeared on a recurring basis every year since. In 2015, she was placed back on contract with the series.

Prior to her first stint on Days of our Lives, Evans portrayed Piper in the teen romantic comedy flick Lovelines. She has guest-starred in number of primetime television series, including Madame’s Place, Father Murphy, Knight Rider, Masquerade, Remington Steele, Riptide, Murder, She Wrote, Law & Order: Special Victims Unit, Monk, Criminal Minds, and Body of Proof.

Evans appeared on other daytime soap operas between her stints at Days of Our Lives. In September 1993, she began playing the villainous Katherine Bell on General Hospital (and later on Port Charles) until October 1999. Evans moved to New York City to play Sierra Estaban on As the World Turns from December 2000 to late 2005, later reprising the role from July 2010 until the show's finale on September 17, 2010. In 2005, One Life to Live almost signed her on contract for the role of Dr. Paige Miller, but Evans backed out at the last moment and the role was filled with Kimberlin Brown.

Since 2010, Evans has starred on the soap opera web series The Bay as Sara Garrett. As a producer for the series, she won a 2015 Daytime Emmy Award for Outstanding New Approaches Drama Series. In 2016, Evans was nominated again as a producer, as well as in the category Outstanding Actress in a Digital Daytime Drama Series for portraying Sara. The same year, she was also nominated in the category of Outstanding Lead Actress in a Drama Series for Days of Our Lives. Evans won all three. She won two more Emmys in 2017 for The Bay, for Outstanding Lead Actress in a Digital Daytime Drama Series and as a producer for Outstanding Digital Daytime Drama Series.

In 2014 and 2015, Evans also appeared as Catherine Hendrie on the ABC Family drama series Chasing Life.

== Personal life ==
Evans was born in Pasadena, California and grew up in Orange County, California. She married cosmetic surgeon Michael Schwartz on November 3, 1985. They have three children, Daniel Luke (born 1987), Katherine Elizabeth (born 1990), and Matthew Joseph (born 1993).

== Filmography ==
=== Film ===
Year	Title	Role	Notes
1984	Toy Soldiers	Buffy	
1984	Lovelines	Piper	
2001	American Coffee	Receptionist	Short

=== Television ===
Year	Title	Role	Notes
1982	Madame’s Place	Sister Barbara	
1982	Father Murphy	Josephine	"Sweet Sixteen"
1983	Secrets of a Mother and Daughter	Kitty Beaumont	TV film
1983	Masquerade	Linda / Arlene	"Girls for Sale"
1984	Riptide	Ellie Thompkins	"Four Eyes"
1984	Knight Rider	Cindy Mattheson	"White-Line Warriors"
1984–1985	Rituals	Dakota 'Koty' Lane	Main role
1985	Remington Steele	Cindy Dirks	"Illustrated Steele"
1986	Knight Rider	Nancy Marsden	"Deadly Knightshade"
1986	Inhumanoids	Eliza Masterson/Molecule	27 Episodes
1986–1992, 2006–present	Days of Our Lives	Kayla Brady	Regular role
1993	Murder, She Wrote	Julie Knight	"The Sound of Murder"
1993–1999	General Hospital	Katherine Bell	Regular role
1993	Crime & Punishment		"Fire with Fire"
1996	General Hospital: Twist of Fate	Katherine Bell	TV film
1997–1999	Port Charles	Katherine Bell	TV series
2000–2005, 2010	As the World Turns	Sierra Estaban Drake	Regular role
2008	Law & Order: Special Victims Unit	Dr. Eichenberry	"Trials"
2009	Monk	Mrs. Rickover	"Mr. Monk and the End: Parts 1 & 2"
2010	Nip/Tuck	Blonde in Waiting Room	"Christian Troy II"
2010	Criminal Minds	Candice DeLilly	"Remembrance of Things Past"
2010–2016	The Bay	Sara Garrett	Main role
2011	Body of Proof	Lawyer	"Lazarus Man"
2011	Pretty the Series	Sara Garrett	"Welcome to Pretty Pageant Therapy"
2014–2015	Chasing Life	Catherine Hendrie	Recurring role
2016–2017	This Just In	Karen	Recurring role
2022	Days of Our Lives: Beyond Salem	Kayla Brady	Season 2

== Awards and nominations ==
Year	Award	Category	Series	Result	Ref.
1989	Soap Opera Digest Award	Favorite Super Couple: Daytime (shared with Stephen Nichols)	Days of Our Lives	Won	
1990	Soap Opera Digest Award	Outstanding Super Couple: Daytime (shared with Stephen Nichols)	Days of Our Lives	Nominated	
2014	Indie Series Award	Best Crossover	The Bay: The Series and Pretty	Nominated	
2015	Daytime Emmy Award	Outstanding New Approaches Drama Series (Producer)	The Bay: The Series	Won	
2016	Daytime Emmy Award	Outstanding Actress in a Digital Daytime Drama Series	The Bay: The Series	Won	
2016	Daytime Emmy Award	Outstanding Digital Daytime Drama Series (Producer)	The Bay: The Series	Won	
2016	Daytime Emmy Award	Outstanding Lead Actress in a Drama Series	Days of Our Lives	Won	
2017	Daytime Emmy Award	Outstanding Lead Actress in a Digital Daytime Drama Series	The Bay: The Series	Won	
2017	Daytime Emmy Award	Outstanding Digital Daytime Drama Series (Producer)	The Bay: The Series	Won	
