= 47th Daytime Creative Arts Emmy Awards =

- Date: June 26, 2020 (Creative Arts Awards); July 19, 2020 (Digital Drama Awards); July 26, 2020 (Children's, Lifestyle and Animation Awards)
- Location: Virtual
- Most awards: The Young and the Restless (5)

Television/radio coverage
- Network: Emmys OTT Platforms

The 47th Annual Daytime Creative Arts Emmy Awards, were presented by the National Academy of Television Arts and Sciences (NATAS), honoring the best in U.S. daytime television programming in 2019. The winners for the creative arts categories were announced on June 26, 2020 via the Twitter, Facebook and Instagram accounts of the Daytime Emmys after the broadcast of the main ceremony. The winners for the digital drama categories were announced on July 19, 2020. The winners for the Children's, Lifestyle and Animation Awards were announced on July 26, 2020, in a live-stream on the Emmys platform, hosted by American comedian Loni Love.

The nominations for both the creative arts and the children's, lifestyle and animation categories were announced alongside the main ceremony categories on May 21, 2020.

Alan Menken became the 16th person to become an EGOT winner.

== Winners and nominees ==
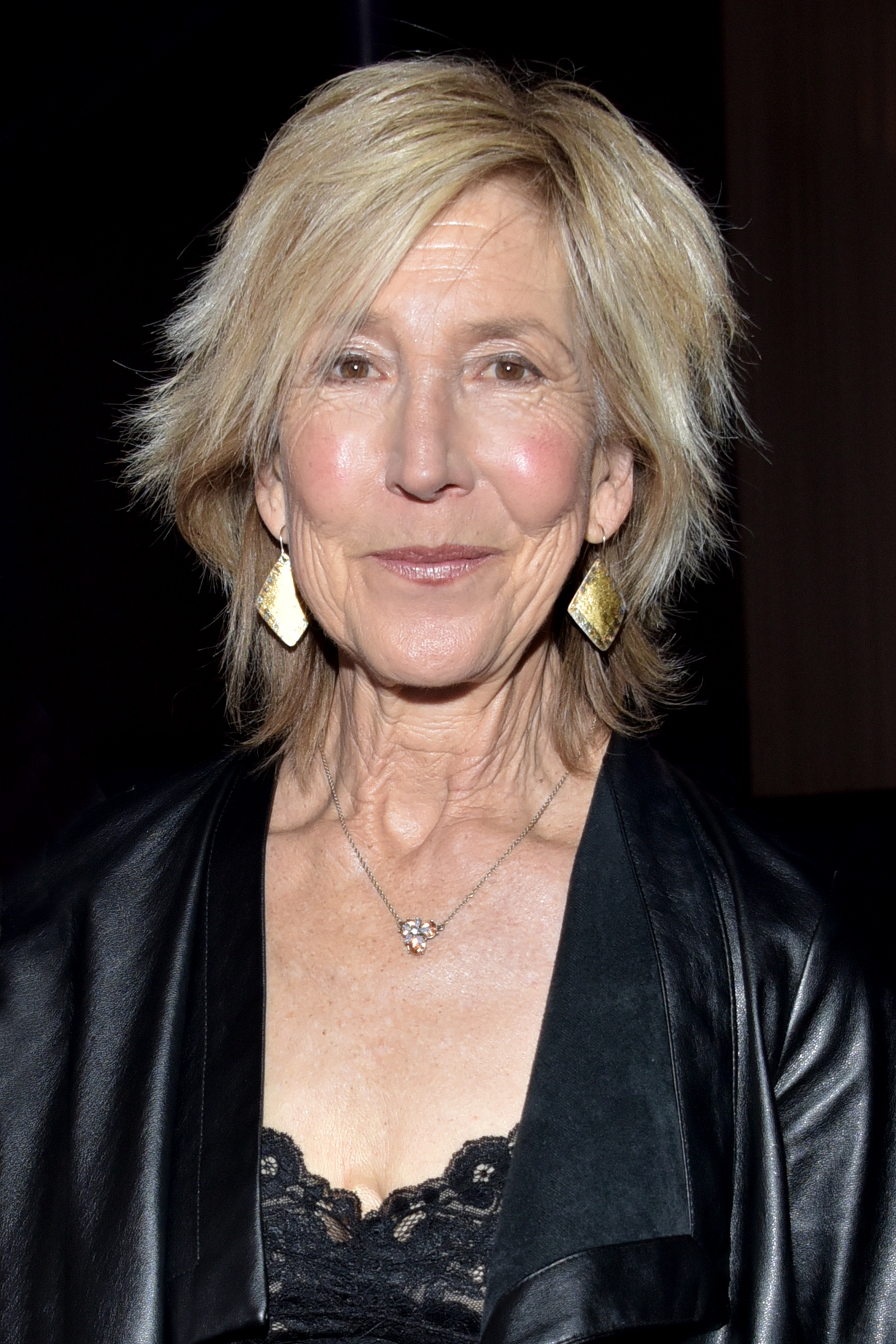
Lin Shaye, Outstanding Guest Performer in a Digital Drama Series winner

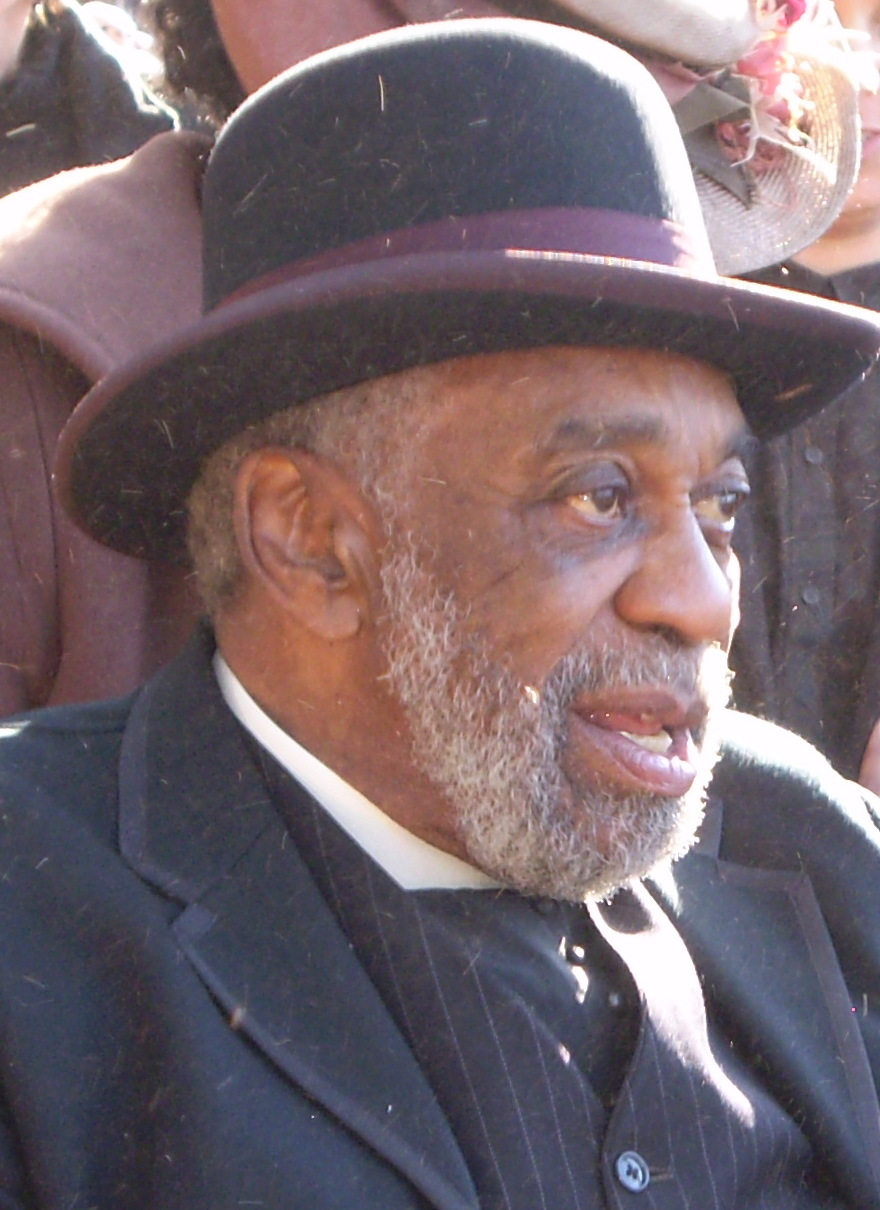
Bill Cobbs, Outstanding Limited Performance in a Daytime Program winner

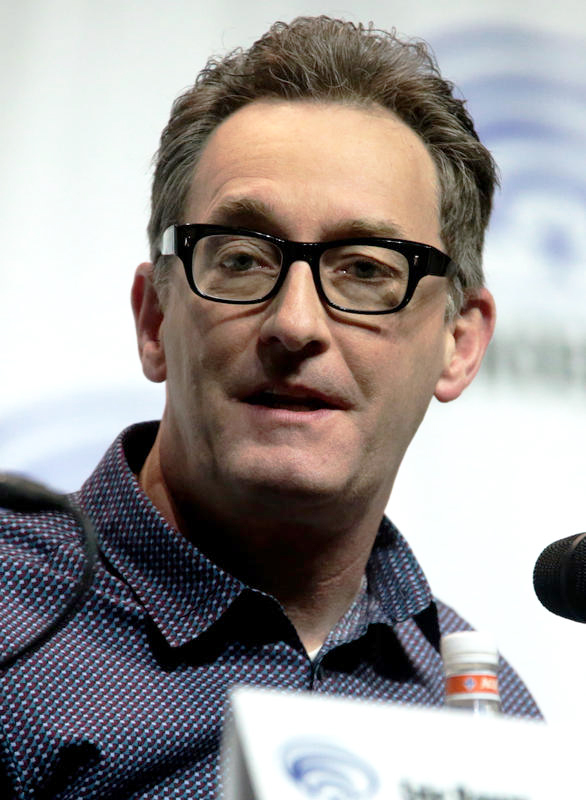
Tom Kenny, Outstanding Performer in an Animated Program winner

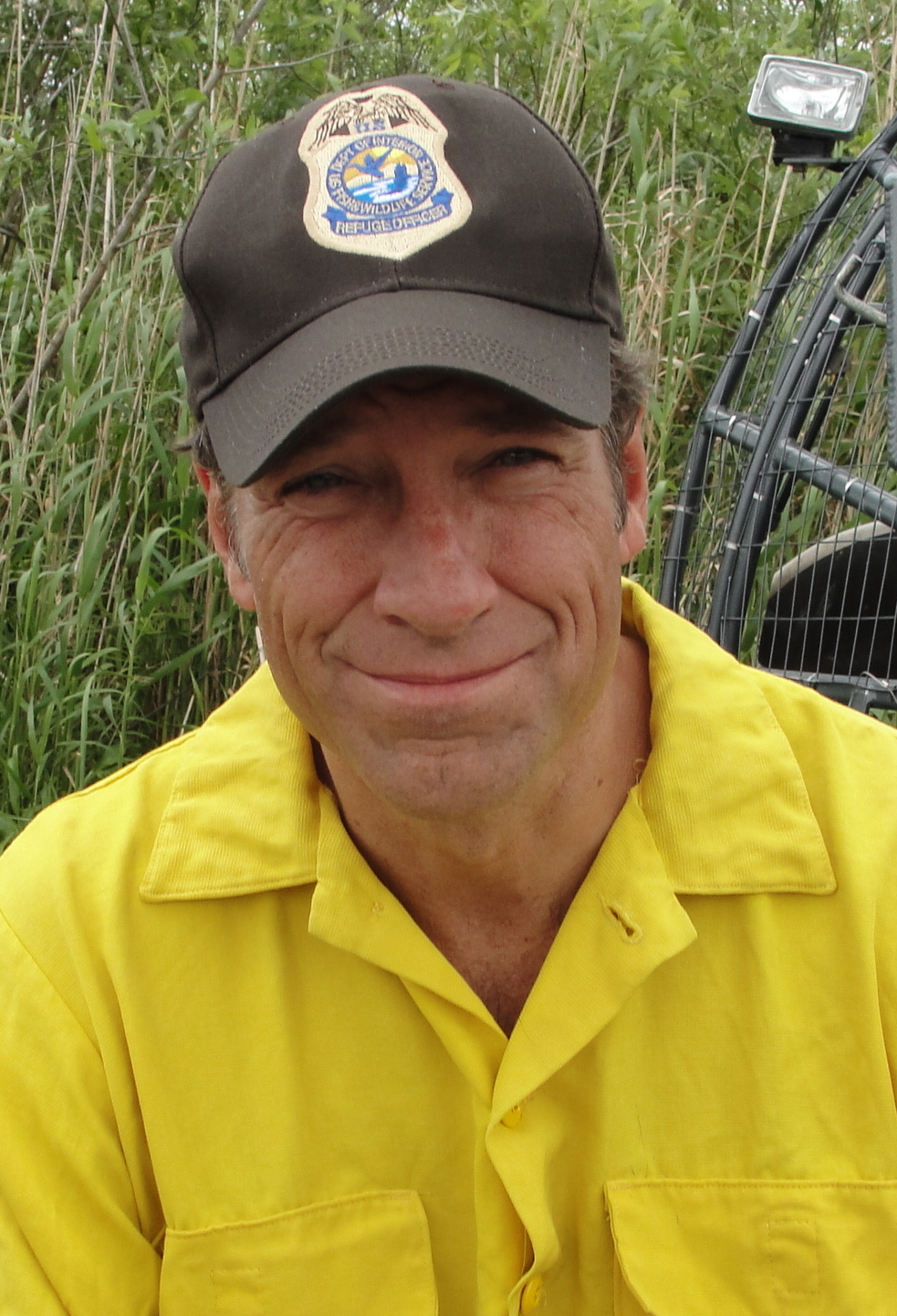
Mike Rowe, Outstanding Host for a Daytime Program winner

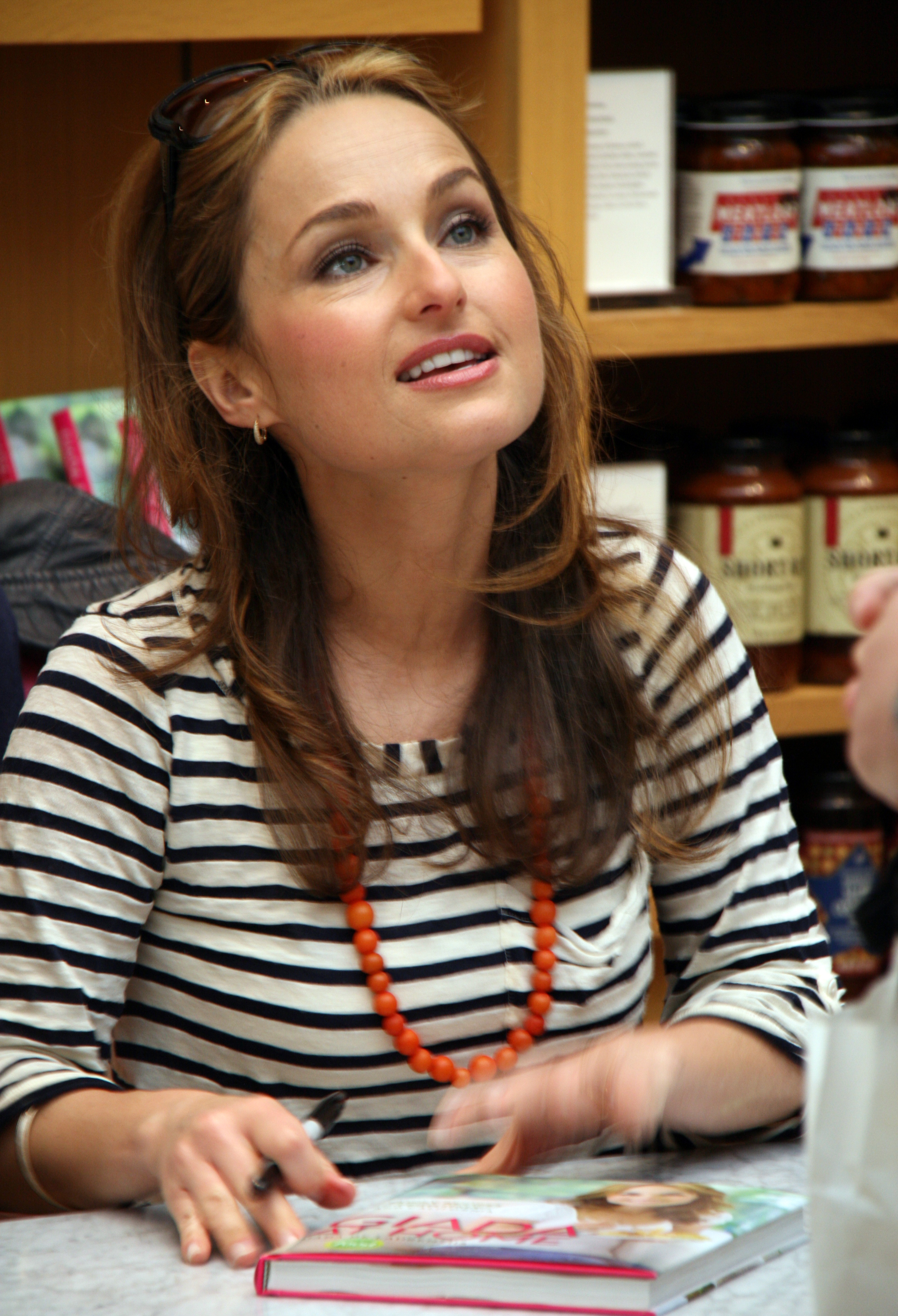
Giada De Laurentiis, Outstanding Culinary Host winner

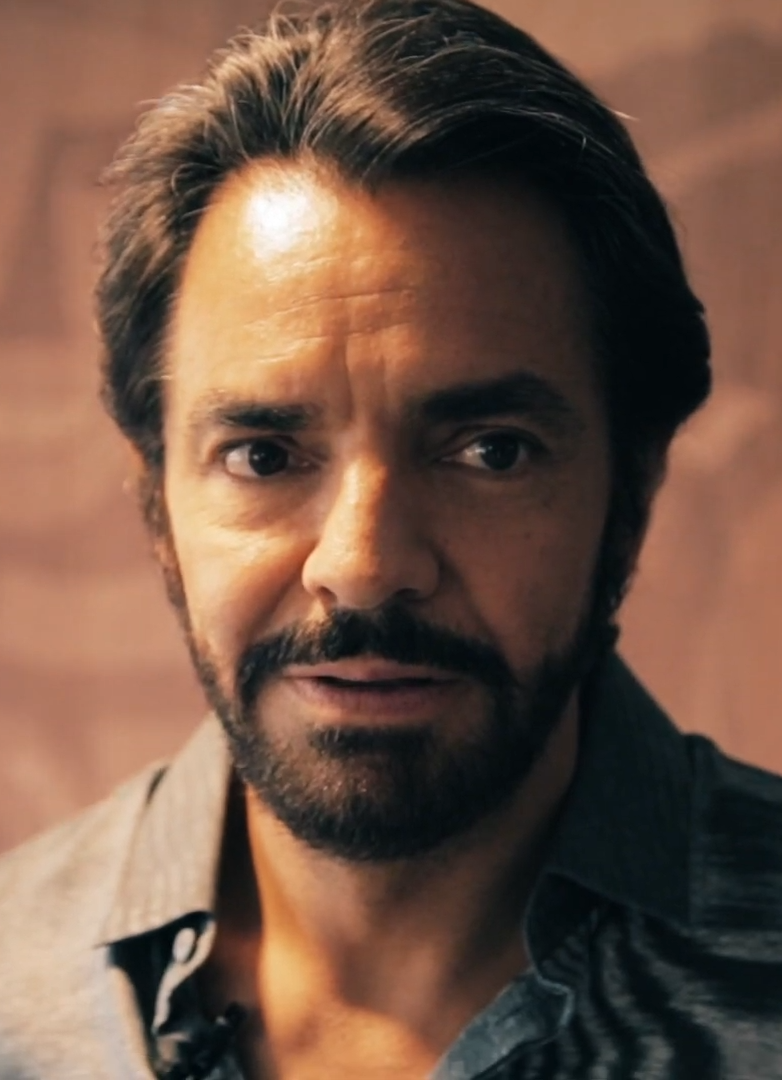
Eugenio Derbez, Outstanding Daytime Talent in a Spanish Language Program winner

The winners are listed first, in boldface.

=== Programming ===
Outstanding Preschool Children's Series	Outstanding Children's or Family Viewing Program
**Sesame Street (HBO)**; Blue's Clues & You! (Nickelodeon); Dino Dana (Amazon Prime Video); Helpsters (Apple TV+); Ryan's Mystery Playdate (Nickelodeon)	**Ghostwriter (Apple TV+)**; Bunk'd (Disney Channel); Holly Hobbie (Hulu); Just Add Magic (Amazon Prime Video); Odd Squad (PBS Kids)
Outstanding Young Adult Program	Outstanding Short Format Children's Program
**Trinkets (Netflix)**; Alexa & Katie (Netflix); The Inspectors (CBS); Light as a Feather (Hulu); Shook (Disney Channel)	**Sesame Street in Communities: Meet Salia (YouTube)**; Muppet Babies: Play Date (Disney Junior); Mushroom and the Forest of the World (Cartoon Network); Sesame Street in Communities: A Place for You (YouTube); Snoopy in Space (Apple TV+)
Outstanding Pre-School Children's Animated Program	Outstanding Children's Animated Program
**Ask the StoryBots (Netflix)**; Bubble Guppies (Nickelodeon); Doc McStuffins (Disney Junior); Floogals (Universal Kids); Norman Picklestripes (Universal Kids); Vampirina (Disney Junior)	**The Dragon Prince (Netflix)**; Arthur (PBS); The Casagrandes (Nickelodeon); Craig of the Creek (Cartoon Network); Niko and the Sword of Light (Amazon Prime Video); Trolls: The Beat Goes On! (Netflix)
Outstanding Special Class Animated Program	Outstanding Educational or Informational Series
**The Last Kids on Earth (Netflix)**; Big City Greens: "Green Christmas" (Disney Channel); Carmen Sandiego (Netflix); Elena of Avalor: "The Magic Within" (Disney Junior); Milo Murphy's Law (Disney Channel)	**Could You Survive the Movies? (YouTube Originals)**; Deadly Engineering (Amazon Prime Video / Science Channel); Glad You Asked (YouTube Originals); Mission Unstoppable (CBS); SciGirls (PBS)
Outstanding Lifestyle Series	Outstanding Travel and Adventure Program
**George to the Rescue (NBC)**; Ask This Old House (PBS); Home Made Simple with Laila Ali (OWN); Open House (NBC); This Old House (PBS)	**The Zimmern List (Travel Channel)**; Jack Hanna's Into the Wild (Syndicated); Ocean Treks with Jeff Corwin (Syndicated); Rock the Park (Syndicated); Samantha Brown's Places To Love (PBS)
Outstanding Morning Show in Spanish	Outstanding Entertainment Program in Spanish
**Café CNN (CNN en Español)**; ¡Despierta América! (Univision); Un Nuevo Día (Telemundo)	**Destinos (CNN en Español)**; El Corazon de Sergio Ramos (Amazon Prime Video); El Gordo y la Flaca (Univision); LOL: Last One Laughing (Amazon Prime Video); Nuestro Mundo (CNN en Español)
Outstanding Special Class Series	Outstanding Special Class Special
**The Day I Picked My Parents (A&E)**; Retro Tech (YouTube Originals); Returning the Favor (Facebook Watch); Super Soul Sunday (OWN); Welcome Home (The CW / BYUtv)	**Sesame Street's 50th Anniversary Celebration (HBO)**; Hate Among Us (Popstar TV); 93rd Annual Macy's Thanksgiving Day (NBC); This Old House 40th Anniversary Special (PBS); The Young and the Restless: "Kristoff St. John Tribute" (CBS)
Outstanding Special Class - Short Format Daytime Program	Outstanding Interactive Media for a Daytime Program
**The Brave (Great Big Story)**; Ally (Healthline); Peanuts in Space: "Secrets of Apollo 10" (Apple TV+); Ready Jet Cook (Food Network); Rewind Nature (NationalGeographic.com)	**Jeopardy! (Syndicated)**; Blue's Clues & You! (Nickelodeon); Light as a Feather (Hulu); Macy's Thanksgiving Day Parade 360 Live (NBC); Scribbles and Ink (PBS)
Outstanding Daytime Promotional Announcement - Topical	Outstanding Daytime Promotional Announcement - Brand Image Campaign - Network/Program
**Jeopardy! All Star Games (Syndicated)**; Days of Our Lives: "Flash Forward" (NBC); Dr. Phil: "Rodney Reed" (Syndicated); Nick Jr Paw Patrol Ready, Race, Rescue: "Trailer" (Nickelodeon); Spirit Riding Free: "Spirit of Christmas" (Netflix); The Star Wars Show: Star Wars Animals: "The Trench Run" (YouTube)	**She-Ra and the Princesses of Power: "She-Ra International Women's Day 2019" (Digital Release)**; Archibald's Next Big Thing: "Series Launch" (Netflix); Disney Team of Heroes (ABC); Family Feud: "On Pause" (Syndicated); Sesame Street: "50th Memories #ThisIsMyStreet Campaign" (YouTube)

=== Performance and Hosting ===
Outstanding Performance by a Lead Actor in a Digital Drama Series	Outstanding Performance by a Lead Actress in a Digital Drama Series
**Kristos Andrews as Pete Garrett on The Bay: The Series (Tubi)**; Alex Hurt as Adam on The Rehearsal (rehearsalseries.com); Brad James as Cameran Jr. on A House Divided (UMC / Amazon Prime Video); Sean Kanan as Sam Stevens on Studio City (Amazon Prime Video); Brian White as Jimmy Blue on Bronx SIU (UMC / Amazon Prime Video)	**Jade Harlow as Lianna Ramos on The Bay: The Series (Tubi)**; Rowin Amone as Ester on Issa Rae Presents King Ester (YouTube); Mary Beth Evans as Sara Garrett on The Bay: The Series (Tubi); Cady Huffman as Lisa on After Forever (Amazon Prime Video); Shanti Lowry as Yolanda Rodriguez on Bronx SIU (UMC / Amazon Prime Video)
Outstanding Performance by a Supporting Actor in a Digital Drama Series	Outstanding Performance by a Supporting Actress in a Digital Drama Series
**Tristan Rogers as Doc on Studio City (Amazon Prime Video)**; Willam Belli as Douglas / Gomorrah Ray on EastSiders (Netflix); Leith M. Burke as Derrick on EastSiders (Netflix); Lenny Wolpe as Carl on After Forever (Amazon Prime Video); Gregory Zarian as Nate on Venice: The Series (Vimeo)	**Tina Benko as Helen on The Rehearsal (rehearsalseries.com)**; Veanne Cox as Lenora on Indoor Boys (Vimeo); Patrika Darbo as Violet on Studio City (Amazon Prime Video); Carolyn Hennesy as Gloria on Studio City (Amazon Prime Video); Janet Hubert as Mignon on Issa Rae Presents King Ester (YouTube)
Outstanding Guest Performer in a Digital Drama Series	Outstanding Principal Performance in a Daytime Program
**Lin Shaye as Diane on EastSiders (Netflix)**; Rene Heger as Zach Sullivan on DARK/WEB (Amazon Prime Video); Mary Beth Peil as Helen on After Forever (Amazon Prime Video); Scott Turner Schofield as Max on Studio City (Amazon Prime Video); Graham Sibley as Leland Adler on DARK/WEB (Amazon Prime Video)	**Ryan Dillon as Elmo, Lefty the Salesman, Don Music on Sesame Street's 50th Anniversary Celebration (HBO)**; Liana Liberato as McKenna Brady on Light as a Feather (Hulu); Damian Toofeek Raven as Chadwick Williams on The Chadwick Journals, Season 3: Oren (Amazon Prime Video); Jordan Rodrigues as Trey Emory on Light as a Feather (Hulu); Brianne Tju as Alex Portnoy on Light as a Feather (Hulu)
Outstanding Limited Performance in a Daytime Program	Outstanding Performer in an Animated Program
**Bill Cobbs as Mr. Hendrickson on Dino Dana (Amazon Prime Video)**; Maria Bamford as Dr. Pat the Mad Scientist on Ask the StoryBots (Netflix); Kathleen Gati as Connie Hunter on A Mermaid for Christmas (Amazon Prime Video); Alice Kremelberg as Kat on The Feels (YouTube); Sara Ramirez as S as Kat on The Feels (YouTube)	**Tom Kenny as SpongeBob SquarePants on SpongeBob SquarePants (Nickelodeon)**; Paget Brewster as Della Duck on DuckTales (Disney Channel); Marieve Herington as Tilly Green on Big City Greens (Disney Channel); Chris Houghton as Cricket Green on Big City Greens (Disney Channel); Parker Simmons as Mao Mao on Mao Mao: Heroes of Pure Heart (Cartoon Network)
Outstanding Performer in a Preschool Animated Program	Outstanding Host for a Daytime Program
**Matt Danner as Kermit, Rowlf, Mr. Waldorf, Beaker, Chef on Muppet Babies (Disney Junior)**; Eric Bauza as Fozzie, Bunsen, Robin, Mr. Statler on Muppet Babies (Disney Junior); Maurice LaMarche as Sylvester Slapdash on The Rocketeer (Disney Junior); Kevin Michael Richardson as King Topher on Puppy Dog Pals: The Mystery of the Missing Golf Ball (Disney Junior); Christian J. Simon as Freddy on T.O.T.S. (Disney Junior)	**Mike Rowe – Returning the Favor (Facebook Watch)**; Jeff Corwin – Ocean Treks with Jeff Corwin (Syndicated); Joseph Gordon-Levitt – Sesame Street's 50th Anniversary Celebration (HBO); Mo Rocca and Alie Ward – The Henry Ford's Innovation Nation (CBS); Andrew Zimmern – The Zimmern List (Travel Channel)
Outstanding Culinary Host	Outstanding Daytime Talent in a Spanish Language Program
**Giada De Laurentiis – Giada Entertains (Food Network)**; Valerie Bertinelli – Valerie's Home Cooking (Food Network); Frankie Celenza – Struggle Meals (Tastemade); Ina Garten – Barefoot Contessa: Cook Like a Pro (Food Network); Rachael Ray – 30 Minute Meals (Food Network)	**Eugenio Derbez – LOL: Last One Laughing (Amazon Prime Video)**; Karina Banda – El Gordo y la Flaca (Univisión); Tanya Charry – El Gordo y la Flaca (Univisión); Oscar Petit – El Gordo y la Flaca (Univisión); Gelena Solano – El Gordo y la Flaca (Univisión)

=== Animation ===
Outstanding Individual Achievement in Animation
- **Trolls: The Beat Goes On! – Olivia Ceballos, Visual Development Artist (Netflix)**
- **Tumble Leaf – Savelen Forrest, Character Animator (Amazon Prime Video)**
- **Carmen Sandiego – Wei Li, Storyboard Artist (Netflix)**
- **Carmen Sandiego – Sylvia Liu, Art Director (Netflix)**
- **Big City Greens – Steve Lowtwait, Background Designer (Disney Channel)**
- **Ask the StoryBots – Chris O'Hara, Character Animator (Netflix)**

=== Art Direction ===
Outstanding Art Direction/Set Decoration/Scenic Design for a Drama or Digital Drama Series	Outstanding Art Direction/Set Decoration/Scenic Design
**The Young and the Restless – David Hoffmann, Jennifer Savala, Jennifer Haybach, Justine Mercado, Raquel Tarbet (CBS)**; After Forever – Scott Michael Salame, Timmy Schues (Amazon Prime Video); Days of Our Lives – Tom Early, Danielle Mullen, Adele Caine (NBC); General Hospital – Jennifer Elliott, Andrew Evashchen (ABC)	**The Kelly Clarkson Show – James Connelly, David Eckert, Crisermy Mercado, Emily Auble, Kelli Bishop, Kevin Grace (Syndicated)**; The Ellen DeGeneres Show – Kristen Adams, Karen Weber, Vanessa Wilkey-Escobar, Chris Cafferty (Syndicated); A Holiday Reunion – Jo Carkner, Felipe Lima, Eduardo Quadra, Tristan Graham, Ricardo Uribe, Jim Elliott, Niki Kendall (NBC); Sesame Street – David Gallo, Elliot Bertoni, Keith Olsen (HBO); The View – Mark Erbaugh (ABC)

=== Casting ===
Outstanding Casting for a Drama or Digital Drama Series	Outstanding Casting for an Animated Series or Special
**EastSiders – Paul Ruddy, Kit Williamson (Netflix)**; The Bold and the Beautiful – Christy Dooley, Rachel Rose Oginsky (CBS); Days of Our Lives – Marnie Saitta, Bob Lambert (NBC); General Hospital – Mark Teschner, Lisa Booth (ABC); The Young and the Restless – Nancy Nayor, Greg Salmon (CBS)	**Green Eggs and Ham – Mary Hidalgo (Netflix)**; Archibald's Next Big Thing – Ania O'Hare, Cymbre Walk Sklar (Netflix); Carmen Sandiego – Jamie Simone, Sierra Leoni (Netflix); Elena of Avalor – David Wright, Jennifer Trujillo, Tatiana Bull (Disney Junior); Puppy Dog Pals – Allyson Bosch (Disney Junior); Rapunzel's Tangled Adventure – Julia Pleasants, David H. Wright III, Sara Jane Sherman (Disney Channel)

=== Cinematography ===
Outstanding Cinematography
- **Tumble Leaf – Jeff Gardner (Amazon Prime Video)**
  - Ghostwriter – George Lajtai (Apple TV+)
  - A Holiday Reunion – Lance Acord, Bob Findlay, Toby Armit (NBC)
  - Just Add Magic – Mark Doering-Powell (Amazon Prime Video)
  - The Square Root – Jeremy Osbern, Matt Jacobson (squarerootseries.com)

=== Costume Design ===
Outstanding Costume Design for a Drama or Digital Drama Series	Outstanding Costume Design/Styling
**The Bold and the Beautiful – Glenda Maddox, Renee Vance Brunson, Jeresa Featherstone, Jennifer Johns, Ross Fuentes, Gail Mosley, Angelo Santos (CBS)**; The Bay: The Series – Gabrielle Sciabbarrasi (Tubi); EastSiders – Blake Patterson, Trevor Dow, Jonathan Skow, Deveny Spafford (Netflix); General Hospital – Shawn Reeves, William Hoffman Jr, Julianna Bolles Morrison, Nicole Nagy, Maki Chaudhuri, Alice Volonino, Nichole Nelson, Margaret Lousen, Christine Shahverdian (ABC); The Young and the Restless – David Zyla, Scott Burkhart, Elif Inanc, Craig Aspden, Theresa Broadnax, Juliet Huerta, Tony Lorito, Andreea Moldovan, Laura Tiefer, Kay Wataguchi (CBS)	**The Real – Oakley Stevenson, Kelly Johnson, Chelsea Von Mach, Kristi Turner, Grace Spann (Syndicated)**; Ghostwriter – Kristin Somborac (Apple TV+); Helpsters – Zeynep Netherton, Kaela Wohl (Apple TV+); No Good Nick – Bramli Knauf (Netflix); The Talk – Cara Giannini, Natalie Foroutan, Tiffany Colicelli, Julie Meinhart, Kristen Greven, Nattaporn Patana, Rhonda Spies (CBS); Tamron Hall – Ashley Miller, Eric Niemand (Syndicated)

=== Directing ===
Outstanding Directing Team for a Digital Drama Series	Outstanding Special Class Directing
**The Bay: The Series – Gregori J. Martin, Kristos Andrews (Tubi)**; Bronx SIU – Mike Mayhall, Dan Garcia (UMC / Amazon Prime Video); DARK/WEB – Michael Nardelli, Mario Miscione, Roxy Shih (Amazon Prime Video); Issa Rae Presents King Ester – Dui Jarrod (YouTube); Studio City – Timothy Woodward Jr. (Amazon Prime Video)	**Hate Among Us – David McKenzie (Popstar TV)**; Hearts of Heroes – Thomas Backer (Syndicated); A Holiday Reunion – Lance Acord (NBC); 93rd Annual Macy's Thanksgiving Day – Ron De Moraes (NBC); This Old House 40th Anniversary Special – John Tomlin (PBS); Stonewall OutLoud – Fenton Bailey, Randy Barbato (YouTube Originals); Working in the Theatre – Margarita Jimeno (AmericanTheatreWing.org)
Outstanding Directing for a Single Camera Daytime Program	Outstanding Directing for a Multiple Camera Daytime Program
**Giada in Italy Capri – Anne Fox (Food Network)**; 1st Look – Brian Mait (NBC); George to the Rescue – Rommel Garcia (NBC); Katie Parla's Rome! – Lisa-Renee Ramirez (Recipe TV); Travels with Darley – Darley Newman, Greg Barna (PBS); Vera's Latin America: Panama – Lisa-Renee Ramirez (Recipe TV)	**Milk Street – Jan Maliszewski (PBS)**; America's Test Kitchen – Herb Sevush (PBS); Cook's Country – Herb Sevush (PBS); Nick Stellino Storyteller in the Kitchen 2 – Bill Brennenstuhl, Paul Stenerson (PBS); Trisha's Southern Kitchen – Lauren Thompson (Food Network)
Outstanding Directing for a Talk, Entertainment News or Morning Show	Outstanding Directing for a Game Show
**Today Show with Hoda & Jenna – Lee Miller, Maryellen Duffy (NBC)**; The Ellen DeGeneres Show – Liz Patrick, Ken Cooper, Huck Hackstedt, Pete Liska, Danielle Campbell, Spencer Emmons (Syndicated); GMA3: Strahan, Sara & Keke – Jerry Foley, Joseph Beltrano, Heather Smith, Brad Hennessy, Eddie Luisi, Alfonso Pena, Kecia Stewart (ABC); Good Morning America – Lily Olszewski (ABC); The Kelly Clarkson Show – Joe Terry, Diana Horn (Syndicated); LIVE with Kelly and Ryan – Brian Chapman, Chelly Cambell, Julian Abio (ABC)	**The Price Is Right – Adam Sandler (CBS)**; Jeopardy! – Clay Jacobsen (Syndicated); Let's Make a Deal – Lenn Goodside (CBS)
Outstanding Directing for a Preschool Animated Program	Outstanding Directing for an Animated Program
**Tumble Leaf – Drew Hodges, Michael Granberry, Dan MacKenzie (Amazon Prime Video)**; Ask the StoryBots – Evan Spiridellis, Jeff Gill, Colin Lepper (Netflix); Elena of Avalor – Elliot Bour, Craig Gerber, Nathan Chew, Robb Pratt, Sam Riegel (Disney Junior); Muppet Babies – Matt Danner, Guy Moore, Collette Sunderman (Disney Junior); Norman Picklestripes – Christopher Sadler, Geoff Walker (Universal Kids); True and the Rainbow Kingdom – Harold Harris (Netflix); Xavier Riddle and the Secret Museum – Cory Bobiak, Steven Boeckler, Susan Hart (PBS)	**Disney Mickey Mouse – Eddie Trigueros (Disney Channel)**; The Adventures of Rocky and Bullwinkle – Greg Miller, Howie Perry, Chuck Sheetz (Amazon Prime Video); Carmen Sandiego – Jos Humphrey, Kenny Park, Mike West, Flavia Guttler, Jamie Simone (Netflix); Kung Fu Panda: The Paws of Destiny – Mike Mullen, Charlie Adler (Amazon Prime Video); Rapunzel's Tangled Adventure – Tom Caulfield, Shane Zalvin, Mary Elizabeth McGlynn (Disney Channel)
Outstanding Directing for a Children's or Young Adult Program
**Sesame Street – Ken Diego, Rick Fernandes, Shannon Flynn, Benjamin Lehmann, Jack Jameson, Linda Mendoza, Liliana Olszewski, Scott Preston, Matt Vogel (HBO)**; Ghostwriter – Luke Matheny, Michael Mohan, Aprill Winney (Apple TV+); Light as a Feather – Joanna Kerns (Hulu); Pup Academy – Anna McRoberts, Robert Vince (Disney Channel); Trinkets – Clare Kilner, Hannah Macpherson, Sherwin Shilati, Sara St. Onge (Netflix)

=== Editing ===
Outstanding Single Camera Editing	Outstanding Editing for an Animated Program
**Peanuts in Space: Secrets of Apollo 10 – Shaun Peterson (Apple TV+)**; CBS Sunday Morning – Editing team (Note: David Bhagat, Lauren Barnello, Chad Cardin, Joseph L Frandino, Ed Givnish, Remington Korper, Mike Levine, George Pozderec, Carol A Ross, David Small, April Wilson, Emanuele Secci, Steven Tyler, Brian Robbins, Henry Ledesma, Malcolm Barnard, Craig Del Gaudio, Trustum Devoe, Nicole Franklin, Doug Manley, Joe Palumbo, Jr, Marian Pitta, Ishwar Bachan, Cynthia Louissaint-Farris, Bob Davis, Lesli Thibould, Bob Mackler, Wendy Solem) (CBS); Helpsters – Rob Arrucci (Apple TV+); MTV News Presents: White Supremacy Destroyed My Life – James Cude, David Isser, Alex Durham, Jeffrey Daniels (MTV); Odd Squad – Jennifer Essex-Chew, Courtney Goldman, Laura Bower (PBS); Rock the Park – Tim Jones, Stephanie To, Rochelle Gibbs (Syndicated); This Old House: 40th Anniversary – Deb Luchini, Adam Bush, Michael Svirsky, Gary Stephenson, Brian Patriacca (PBS)	**Disney Mickey Mouse – Tony Molina, Mark Bollinger (Disney Channel)**; DuckTales – Jasmine Bocz, Michael Williamson, Barbara Duffy, Susan Odjakjian (Disney Channel); Mao Mao: Heroes of Pure Heart – Doug Vito, Todd Raleigh, Jocelyn Barkenhagen, Haley Gansert (Cartoon Network); Pinky Malinky – R Chett Hoffman, Rachael Russakoff, Matthew Winslow, Jon Kinyon, Ralph A Eusebio (Netflix); Rapunzel's Tangled Adventure – Tony Rocco, Kevin Locarro, John Royer, Ted Supa, Louis Russell (Disney Channel)
Outstanding Multiple Camera Editing for a Drama or Digital Drama Series	Outstanding Multiple Camera Editing
**General Hospital – Peter Fillmore, Allison Reames Smith, Marika Kushel, Teresa Cicala, Steven Gonzalez, Stephen (ABC)**; The Bold and the Beautiful – Anthony Pascarelli, Marc Beruti, Chad Mochrie (CBS); Days of Our Lives – Lugh Powers, Kevin Church, Jenee Muyeau, Michael Fiamingo, Joseph Lumer (NBC); The Young and the Restless – Derek Berlatsky, Kimberly Everett, Rafael Gertel, Andrew Hachem, Sean Isom, Leif Sandaas (CBS)	**Sesame Street's 50th Anniversary Celebration – Todd E. James, Memo Salazar, Jordan Santora, Ed Kulzer (HBO)**; Articulate with Jim Cotter – Tom Contarino, Mark Miller (PBS); Consumer 101 – Aaron Bauer, Justin Zangerle, Grant Swanson, Devin Carey (NBC); Milk Street – Travis Marshall, Michael Andrus, Josh Mercado (PBS); The View – Brian Davis, Jamie Pilarski, Rich Provost (ABC)

=== Hairstyling ===
Outstanding Hairstyling for a Drama Series	Outstanding Hairstyling
**The Young and the Restless – Regina Rodriguez, Adriana Lucio, Lauren Mendoza, Vanessa Bragdon, Dorchelle Stafford, Jackie Zavala (CBS)**; Days of Our Lives – Marisa Ramirez, Sarah Ault, Armando Licon (NBC); General Hospital – Anzhela Adzhiyan, Kelly Davison, Nikki Young, Abraham Rivera, Curt Darling, Hannah Hughes (ABC)	**The Real – Roberta Gardener-Rogers, Rachel Mason, Noogie Thai, Ray Dobson (Syndicated)**; Home & Family – Francine Valdivia, Marti Ruiz, Jan Ping, Michelle Bottarini (Hallmark Channel); Jeopardy! – Rene Ferruggia (Syndicated); LIVE with Kelly and Ryan – Diane D'Agostino, Vanessa Alcala (Syndicated); The Talk – Steven Berg, Vickie Mynes, Angela Stevens, Nicole Walpert (CBS); The View – Rosa Amoedo, Derick Monroe, Dora Smagler (ABC)

=== Lighting Direction ===
Outstanding Lighting Direction for a Drama or Digital Drama Series	Outstanding Lighting Direction
**The Bold and the Beautiful – Patrick Cunniff, Phil Callan (CBS)**; **DARK/WEB – Vasiliki Constantinou, Avery Holliday, Lars Lindstrom (Amazon Prime Video)**; Days of Our Lives – Ted Polmanski, Mark Levin (NBC); General Hospital – Vincent Steib, Melanie Mohr, Bob Bessoir (ABC); The Young and the Restless – Ed Burgess, William Roberts (CBS)	**The Kelly Clarkson Show – Darren Langer (Syndicated)**; Ghostwriter – George Lajtai (Apple TV+); A Holiday Reunion – Lance Acord (NBC); Sesame Street – Dan Kelley (HBO); The View – James Gallagher (ABC)

=== Main Title Design ===
Outstanding Main Title and Graphic Design for a Live-Action Program	Outstanding Main Title for an Animated Program
**Sesame Street's 50th Anniversary Celebration – Rickey Boyd, Michael Lapinski, Vanessa Germosen, Jany Tran, Rob Zangrillo, Trea Bailey, Kimberly Cranfield, James Elston, Beaux Latham, Ashley Malone, Christin Smolinski, Rhea Borzak, Joël Gibbs, Julian Herrera, Shandi Owens, Abdel Pizzaro, Jonathan Ritchter, Joel Robertson, Rhea Borzak (HBO)**; Boom Bust – Makhail Solodovnikov, Oganes Mkrtchian, Walid Haddad (RT America); DARK/WEB – Michael Nardelli, Tim Nardelli, Mario Miscione, Justin Martinez (Amazon Prime Video); El Corazon de Sergio Ramos – Travis Boain (Amazon Prime Video); Ghostwriter – J.J. Johnson, Matthew J.R. Bishop, Stephen Curran, Daryl Shail, Nial McFadyen (Apple TV+)	**The Casagrandes – Alan Foreman, Miguel Puga, Miguel Gonzalez, Hallie Lal (Nickelodeon)**; **Rapunzel's Tangled Adventure – Chris Sonnenburg, Bryan Deemer, Jezreel Carlos, Claire Keane, Darren Clark, Antonello Stornelli, John Royer (Disney Channel)**; The Adventures of Rocky and Bullwinkle – Chris Mitchell, Stéphane Coëdel, Jesse Willson, Carolina González, Ricky Laity, H. Kristen Campbell, Toan Nguyen (Amazon Prime Video); Green Eggs and Ham – Cody Cameron, Helen Kalafatic, Timothy Yoo, Eusong Lee, Jasmin Lai, Stéphane Coëdel, Tor Aunet, Linda Fong, Elaine Lee, Sylvia Liu, Eastwood Wong, Nelson Boles, Thea Glad, Gervais Merryweather, Tommy Rodricks, Natan Moura, Sarah Kambara, Myles Shioda, Kevin Dart (Netflix); The Rocketeer – Michael Kenny, Jake Joice, Jeff Gordon (Disney Junior)

=== Makeup ===
Outstanding Makeup for a Drama Series	Outstanding Makeup
**The Young and the Restless – Patricia Denney, Kathy Jones, Marlene Mason, Laura Schaffer, Kelsey Collins, Robert Bolger (CBS)**; Days of Our Lives – Deidre Decker, Nick Schillace, Karen Dahl, Elizabeth Dahl (NBC); General Hospital – Angela Shackleton, Bobbi Roberts, Caitlin Klepadlo, Luiza Adzhiyan, Tamar Papirian, Alexandra Fleck, Karen Simon (ABC)	**The Talk – Gabbi Pascua, Jude Alaca, Marilyn Spiegel, Dell McDonald, Michelle Daurio, Ernesto Casillas, Brianna Schwep (CBS)**; EastSiders – Robert Hensley, Mary Chip, Willam Belli, Manila Luzon, Biqtch Puddin', Katya, Marta Beatchu, Lizzy Kjartanson (Netflix); The Real – Melanie Mills, Uzmee Krakovszki, Motoko Honjo Clayton, Glen Alen (Syndicated); The View – Rebecca Borman, Lynette Broom, Karen Dupiche, Joanna Rodriguez (ABC); Tamron Hall – Tenelle Veira, Travis Culberson, Aeriel Payne (Syndicated)

=== Music ===
Outstanding Music Direction and Composition for a Drama or Digital Drama Series	Outstanding Music Direction and Composition
**Days of Our Lives – Paul Antonelli, Steve Reinhardt, Ken Corday, D. Brent Nelson (NBC)**; DARK/WEB – Carly Van Skaik, Jonathan Hartman (Amazon Prime Video); Pillow Talk – Justin Allen, Tarasha Riles, Justin Eugene Thomas (YouTube); The Young and the Restless – R.C. Cates, Mike Dobson, Brad Hatfield, Gaye Tolan Hatfield, Rick Krizman, Gary Kuo (CBS)	**The Tom & Jerry Show – Vivek Maddala, Steve Morrell (Boomerang)**; The Dragon Prince – Frederik Wiedmann (Netflix); Elena of Avalor – Tony Morales (Disney Junior); Ninjago: Masters of Spinjitzu – Michael Kramer, Jay Vincent, Jeppe Riddervold (Cartoon Network); Rapunzel's Tangled Adventure – Kevin Kliesch (Disney Channel)
Outstanding Original Song	Outstanding Original Song for a Children's, Young Adult or Animated Program
**Brainwashed By Toons – "The Bad Guys?" by Gregory James Jenkins, Jason Alexander, Neil Garguilo, Dwayne Colbert, Hughie Stone Fish (funnyordie.com)**; The Feels – "Everything Has Changed" by Sara Ramirez (YouTube); General Hospital – "North Star" by William Lipton, Nick Gracia, Rob Marshall (ABC); 93rd Annual Macy's Thanksgiving Day – "A Holiday Carol - The Holidays Are Here" by Judith Clurman, Wesley Whatley (NBC); 93rd Annual Macy's Thanksgiving Day – "Hooray Hooray, We're On Our Way" by Bill Sherman, Dominic Fallacaro, Andrew Moriarty, Wesley Whatley (NBC)	**Rapunzel's Tangled Adventure – "Rapunzel and the Great Tree: Waiting in the Wings" by Alan Menken, Glenn Slater (Disney Channel)**; Big Hero 6: The Series – "Gonna Go Good" by Adam Berry, Mark McCorkle, Sharon Flynn, Bob Schooley (Disney Channel); Elena of Avalor – "Never Leave" by John Kavanaugh, Craig Gerber, Jeffrey M. Howard (Disney Junior); The Lion Guard – "As You Move Forward" by Beau Black, Ford Riley, Jennifer Skelly (Disney Junior); Vampirina – "The Vamp Opera" by Michael Kooman, Christopher Dimond, Chris Nee (Disney Junior)

=== Technical Direction ===
Outstanding Technical Team for a Drama Series	Outstanding Technical Team
**General Hospital – Kevin Carr, Chuck Abate, Craig Camou, Barbara Langdon, Dean Cosanella, Antonio Simone (ABC)**; The Bold and the Beautiful – Gary Chamberlin, Jack Kidd, Jr., Angee D. Gates, Ted Morales, John Carlson, Nico Otto Svoboda, Roberto Bosio, Keven Scotti, George Forbes (CBS); Days of Our Lives – John Sizemore, Mike Caruso, Steve Clark, Michael Denton, Victoria Walker, Alexis Hansen (NBC); The Young and the Restless – Tracy Lawrence, John Bromberek, Luis Godinez Jr., Kai Kim, William Looper, Roberto Bosio, Kevin Scotti (CBS)	**Sesame Street's 50th Anniversary Celebration – Tom Guadarrama, Frank Biondo, Jerry Cancel, Shaun Harkins, James Meek (HBO)**; CBS This Morning – Technical team (Note: Nominees: Fountain Jones, Mark Haffner, Hal Furman, Maximilian Avans, Chris Balogun, Joseph Basile, John Curtin, Jared Hanna, Anthony Planes, Andy Robinson, Michael Schmehl, Claus Stuhlweissenburg, Lee Warden, Reggie Barringer, Pat Coney, Tony Furlow, Brian Fuss, Neil Grasso, Mark Mazariegos, Page McCarty, Victor Ulloa, Al Schatz, Glen Zachar, John Fantacone, Bruce Tidwell) (CBS); Disney Parks Magical Christmas Day Parade – Technical team (Note: Nominees: Shiran Stotland, Bill Avzaradel, Bill Kavis, Tad Scripter, Jon Mauldin, Nina Allen, Tyler Bland, Russ T. Gee, Mike Gupta, Eric Hall, C. Kirby Miovac, Mark Schnallinger, Chris Simmons, Steph Vought, Brian Rachko, Rubin Banuelos, Greg Everett, Tommy McManus, Jeff Welton, John Atkinson, Marc Bloomgarden, Danny Bonilla, Larry Boothby, Rob Curschman, Dave Eastwood, Nick Fayo, Nat Havholm, Travis Hays, Tom Hildreth, Dave Levisohn, Dave Plakos, Ron Rigoli, Jofre Rosero, Fed Wetherbee) (ABC); The Kelly Clarkson Show – Tom Henson, Dick Mort, Dean Anderson, Ralph Bolton, Kenny Patterson, Drew Jansen, Eric Taylor, Dave Nash, Wade Bobbitt (Syndicated); The Price Is Right – Glenn Koch, Edward Nelson, Wayne Getchell, Brent Roberts, Bob Smith, Fernando Thomas, Rick Labgold (CBS); The View – Rene M Butler, Michael Danisi, Nick Davis, Donato Depasquale, Robert Feder, Gary Jelaso, Robert Johnson, Hardy Kluender, Jose Lara, Denis Linehan, David J Montroni, Douglas Schneider, John Kokinis (ABC)

=== Sound ===
Outstanding Live and Direct to Tape Sound Mixing for a Drama Series	Outstanding Live and Direct to Tape Sound Mixing
**The Young and the Restless – Andrzej Warzocha, Dean Johnson, Mark Mooney, Ricky Alverez, Joseph Lawrence, Thomas Luth, Denise Palm Stones, Marisa Garcia (CBS)**; The Bold and the Beautiful – James Aaron Lepley, Brian Connell, Daniel Lecuna, Jerry Martz, Tommy Persson, Justin Michael Lamont, Julian Salas, Nick Krotov, Giovanni Meza (CBS); Days of Our Lives – Kevin Church, Lugh Powers, Jenee Muyeau, Michael Fiamingo, Joseph Lumer, Marco Fox, Roger Cortes, Harry Young, Stu Rudolph, Nick Kleissas (NBC); General Hospital – Christopher Banninger, Donald Smith, Nick Marcus, Jimmy Chang, Paul Glass, David MacLeod, Alan Zema, Thomas Byrne (ABC)	**The Price Is Right – Henry Muehlhausen, Nancy Perry, Brian Rushing, Joshua Gardner, Robbi Sutherland, Frankie Le Nguyen, Jennifer Fah-Vayhinger, Nicole Katz, La-Aja Hernandez, Doug Schneider, Matthew Van Lannin, Stephanie Abbott (CBS)**; The Ellen DeGeneres Show – Terry Fountain, Dirk Sciarrotta, Phil Gebhardt, Liz Cabral, Ron Thompson, Liza Tan, Ryan Curry (Syndicated); Family Feud – Dirk Sciarrotta, Jeff Frickman, Jennifer Vannoy-Rounsaville, Liza Tan, Lance Gardhouse, Joey Adelman, Philip Gebhardt, John Protzko, Joshua Manville (Syndicated); The Kelly Clarkson Show – James Slanger, Chris Michaelessi, Eddie Marquez, Bob Lewis, Danny Cruz, Jennifer Vannoy-Rounsaville (Syndicated); The View – Chris Rich (ABC)
Outstanding Sound Mixing	Outstanding Sound Mixing for an Animated Program
**Articulate with Jim Cotter – John Avarese (PBS)**; Beyond Your Backyard – Harry Watson (PBS); The Henry Ford's Innovation Nation – Asif Ali (CBS); A Holiday Reunion – Matt Miller, Ian Connie, Michael Anastasi (NBC); Mission Unstoppable – Asif Ali (CBS); Sesame Street – Dick Maitland, Chris Prinzivalli, Michael Barrett, Michael Croiter, Steve "Major" Giammaria, Dan O'Sullivan, Paul Rudolph, Chris Sassano (HBO)	**Batman: Hush – D.J. Lynch, Rob McIntyre, Aran Tanchum, Mark Mercado, Jon Abelardo (Warner Bros Animation)**; DC Showcase: Death – Devon Bowman, George Peters, Shaun Cunningham, Peter Munters, Mark Mercado, Aran Tanchum, Jon Abelardo, Sam Porcaro, Sean Jacobson (Warner Bros Animation); Lego DC Batman: Family Matters – D.J. Lynch, Rob McIntyre, Aran Tanchum, Peter Munters, George Peters (Amazon Prime Video); Reign of the Supermen – D.J. Lynch, Mark Mercado, Jon Abelardo, Rob McIntyre, Aran Tanchum (Amazon Prime Video); SpongeBob SquarePants – D.J. Lynch, Justin Brinsfield, Ryan Greene, Manny Grijalva, Jeffrey Hutchins, Aran Tanchum (Nickelodeon)
Outstanding Sound Mixing for a Preschool Animated Program	Outstanding Sound Editing for a Live Action Program
**Elena of Avalor – Melissa Ellis, Fil Brown (Disney Junior)**; Dragons Rescue Riders – Mark Mercado, Carlos Sanches (Netflix); Let's Go Luna! – Mike Mancuso (PBS); The Rocketeer – Eric Lewis, Jay Culliton (Disney Junior); Tumble Leaf – John Jackson (Amazon Prime Video)	**Odd Squad – James Robinson, Bill Turchinetz, John Douglas Smith, P. Jason MacNeill, Ryan Lukasik, Jason Charbonneau, Brandon Bak (PBS)**; Dino Dana – Sean Karp, Will Preventis, Noah Siegel, Blag Ahilov, Jakob Thiesen (Amazon Prime Video); El Corazon de Sergio Ramos – Ben Eisele, Gabriel Vidauri, Ryan D. Adams, Ronky Rodriguez (Amazon Prime Video); Ghostwriter – Sean Karp, Noah Siegel, Will Preventis, Brandon Bak, Jason Charbonneau, Stef Fraticelli, Ron Mellegers, John Sievert, Randy Wilson (Apple TV+); Trinkets – Trip Brock, Dean Menta, Jacob Ortiz, Bruce Stubblefield, Jackie Johnson, Brian Miller, Ray Park, Zheng Jia, Xiang Li, Alexander Jongbloed, Lorita de la Cerna (Netflix)
Outstanding Sound Editing for an Animated Program	Outstanding Sound Editing for a Preschool Animated Program
**Batman: Hush – D.J. Lynch, Rob McIntyre, Lawrence Reyes, Evan Dockter, Derek Swanson, Devon Bowman, Mark Mercado, Jon Abelardo, Mark Keatts, David Cowan, Kelly Foley Downs, Patrick Foley, Mike Garcia, Vincent Guisetti, Aran Tanchum, Alfredo Douglas (Warner Bros Animation)**; Carmen Sandiego – Jason Fredrickson, Todd Araki, Kirk Furniss, Eric Lewis, Terry Reiff, Christine Church, Adam McGhie (Netflix); DuckTales – Jeff Shiffman, Ian Howard, Katie Maynard, Carol Ma (Disney Channel); Invader Zim: Enter the Florpus – Kate Finan, Jeff Shiffman, Johnathan Hylander, Tess Fournier, Ben Gieschen, Greg Rubin, Mitchell Lestner, Jessey Drake, Carol Ma, Ian Howard (Netflix); Reign of the Supermen – D.J. Lynch, Rob McIntyre, John Reynolds, Mark Keatts, David Cowan, Kelly Foley Downs, Patrick Foley, Mike Garcia, Ezra Walker, Evan Dockter, Devon Bowman, Mark Mercado, Jon Abelardo, Vincent Guisetti, Aran Tanchum, Alfredo Douglas (Amazon Prime Video); Tales of Arcadia: 3Below – Otis Van Osten, Jason Oliver, Carlos Sanchez, Tommy Sarioglou, Aran Tanchum, Vincent Guisetti, James Miller (Netflix)	**Elena of Avalor – Robert Poole II, Robbi Smith, David Bonilla, J. Lampinen (Disney Junior)**; Ask the StoryBots – Jeff Shiffman, Tess Fournier, Jacob Cook, Ian Howard, Johnathan Lopez, Nicholas J. Ainsworth (Netflix); Dragons Rescue Riders – Otis Van Osten, Josh Johnson, Carlos Sanches, Jason Oliver, Mishelle Fordham, Gouen Lee, Tommy Sarioglou (Netflix); Puppy Dog Pals – Otis Van Osten, Jason Oliver, Jay Culliton, Tommy Sarioglou (Disney Junior); The Rocketeer – Otis Van Osten, James Miller, Jason Oliver, Eric Lewis, Tommy Sarioglou (Disney Junior)

=== Special Effects ===
Outstanding Special Effects Costumes, Makeup and Hairstyling
- **Dino Dana – Christine Toye, Liz Roelands, Karlee Morse (Amazon Prime Video)**
- **Sesame Street – David Bizzaro, Erin Black, Jennifer Caprio, Ben Durocher, Joel Gennari, Tyler Hall, Brian C. Hemesath, Michelle Hickey, Ann Marie Holdgruen, Rollie Krewson, Sarah Lafferty, Lara MacLean, Anney Ozar, Constance Peterson, Kate Rusek, Sierra Schoening, Polly Smith, Keely Snook, David Valentine, Jason Weber, Stacey Weingarten (HBO)**
  - Ghostwriter – Kristin Somborac, Liz Roelands, Lynda McCormack (Apple TV+)
  - Helpsters – Andrea Detwiler, Jean Marie Keevins, Jimmy Helvin, Marc Petrosino, Michael Latini, Dan Cook, Jeremy Holmes (Apple TV+)
  - Odd Squad – Christine Toye, Liz Roelands, Jenna Servatius (PBS)

=== Writing ===
Outstanding Writing Team for a Digital Drama Series	Outstanding Writing for a Children's or Young Adult Program
**After Forever – Michael Slade, Kevin Spirtas (Amazon Prime Video)**; The Bay: The Series – Gregori J. Martin, Wendy Riche (Tubi); EastSiders – Kit Williamson, Brea Grant, Stephen Guarino (Netflix); Issa Rae Presents King Ester – Dui Jarrod (YouTube); Studio City – Lauren De Normandie, Sean Kanan, Timothy Woodward Jr, Jason Antognoli, Michele Kanan (Amazon Prime Video)	**Trinkets – Amy Andelson, Stephanie Coggins, Linda Gase, Emily Meyer, Jess Meyer, Kirsten "Kiwi" Smith, Matt Shire (Netflix)**; Free Rein – Vicki Lutas, Anna McCleery (Netflix); Ghostwriter – Andrew Orenstein, Levi Abrino, Joanna Quraishi, Lauren Thompson, Mark Blutman, Aminta Goyel (Apple TV+); Helpsters – Tim McKeon, Nick Confalone, Alex Fox, Rachel Lewis, Anna Christopher, Liz Hara, Annabeth Bondor-Stone, Laurie Israel, Amy Keating Rogers, Connor White (Apple TV+); Sesame Street – Ken Scarborough, Molly Boylan, Jessica Carleton, Geri Cole, Joe Fallon, Christine Ferraro, Liz Hara, Ron Holsey, Raye Lankford, Luis Santerio, Belinda Ward (HBO)
Outstanding Writing for a Preschool Animated Program	Outstanding Writing Team for an Animated Program
**Elena of Avalor – Craig Gerber, Silvia Olivas, Kate Kondell, Tom Rogers, Rachel Ruderman, Cam Baity (Disney Junior)**; Ask the StoryBots – Gregg Spiridellis, Evan Spiridellis, Nate Theis, Henock Lebsekal, Eddie West (Netflix); Daniel Tiger's Neighborhood – Angela Santomero, Becky Friedman, Jill Cozza-Turner, Jennifer Hamburg, Alexandra Cassel Schwartz (PBS); Nature Cat – Adam Rudman, David Rudman, Joey Mazzarino, Jill Cozza-Turner, George Arthur Bloom (PBS); The Rocketeer – Nicole Dubuc, Greg Johnson, Brian Hohlfeld, Kendall Haney, Claudia Silver (Disney Junior); Tumble Leaf – Drew Hodges, Carin Greenberg, Shane Portman (Amazon Prime Video)	**Rapunzel's Tangled Adventure – Jase Ricci, Ricky Roxburgh (Disney Channel)**; Big City Greens – Shane Houghton, Chris Houghton, Kenny Byerly, Carson Montgomery, Natasha Kline, Anna O'Brian (Disney Channel); Big Hero 6: The Series – Sharon Flynn, Jenny Jaffe, Paiman Kalayeh, Han-Yee Ling, Jeff Poliquin (Disney Channel); DuckTales – Francisco Angones, Colleen Evanson, Madison Bateman, Christian Magalhaes, Bob Snow, Suzanna Olson, Matthew Youngberg (Disney Channel); Green Eggs and Ham – Jared Stern, Mark Rizzo, Vanessa McGee, John Whittington (Netflix)
Outstanding Writing for a Special Class Series	Outstanding Writing for a Special Class Special
**The Henry Ford's Innovation Nation – Jim Lichtenstein, Stephanie Himango, John Murphy, Norma Rubio, Alie Ward (CBS)**; Brainwashed By Toons – Neil Garguilo, Dwayne Colbert, Jason Alexander, Wayne Brady, Lea Thompson, Zabeth Russell, Hughie Stone Fish, Gregory James Jenkins (funnyordie.com); The Ellen DeGeneres Show – Kevin A. Leman II, Jason Gelles, Lauren Pomerantz, Ellen DeGeneres, Alison Balian, Jamie Brunton, Bente Engelstoft, Rick Mitchell, Gil Rief, Michael Tiberi, Troy Thomas, Adam Yenser (Syndicated); Rock the Park – Tye Schulke (Syndicated)	**Sesame Street's 50th Anniversary Celebration – Ken Scarborough, Christine Ferraro (HBO)**; 2019 Film Independent Spirit Awards – David Ferguson, Chelsea Davison, Mike Lawrence, Kurt Metzger, Eliza Skinner, Nick Wiger, David Wild, Wendy Button (IFC); The 2019 Rose Parade with Cord & Tish – Will Ferrell, Andrew Steele, Jake Foglenest, Jocelyn Richard (funnyordie.com); Mind Field: What Is the Scariest Thing? – David Wechter, Michael Stevens, Tom Kramer, Daniel Toker (YouTube Originals); Peanuts in Space: Secrets of Apollo 10 – Aaron Bergeron (Apple TV+); This Old House 40th Anniversary Special – John Tomlin (PBS)
