= Celeste Fianna =

American actress

- Born: July 7, 1988 (age 37); Venice, California
- Education: Santa Monica College
- Occupations: Producer, actress, writer, realtor
- Years active: 2008–present
- Notable work: The Bay
- Family: Kristos Andrews (brother), Angelica Drum (sister)
- Awards: Daytime Emmy, Best Short at Burbank Intl. Film Festival, HollyWeb Festival Award

Celeste Fianna (born Celeste Fianna Andrew-Drum on July 7, 1988) is an American actress, film & television producer, and professional real estate entrepreneur. She is the recipient of several accolades including five Daytime Emmy Awards, a Burbank International Film Festival Award, and a HollyWeb Festival Award. In 2019, Fianna received a Daytime Emmy Award pre-nomination in the category "Outstanding Supporting Actress in a Digital Daytime Drama Series" for her work as an actress on The Bay.

== Career ==
Fianna is best known for her role as "Tamara Garrett" on Pop TV's serial drama series The Bay. Fianna is a partner at LANY films and television, LLC, d.b.a. LANY Entertainment, also working with the company as a co-executive producer and actress. She is the recipient of eight Daytime Emmy Award nominations for The Bay, she is a five-time winner as co-executive producer and producer of the series. She also received a Daytime Emmy Award nomination for her work as a producer on Pop TV's teen sitcom This Just In, a co-production by LANY Entertainment in association with Associated Television International (ATI).

== Personal life ==
Fianna was born in Venice, California on July 7, 1988. She is the daughter of the late Catherine Andrews (1942–2017), a noted inspirational pioneer visionary artist & musician, and Gary Drum, a musician. She has a brother, Kristos Andrews, and a sister, Angelica Drum. Fianna attended Santa Monica College where she studied psychology. Fianna received her real estate license in 2006. In February 2007, she co-founded a family-owned vacation rental business where she worked until July 2011. She also worked in the REO Income Property Acquisitions Department at Ben Leeds Properties from September 2010 to September 2011. Fianna joined Rodeo Realty, Inc. in April 2014 as a real estate agent, working with the company until June 2016. From April 2015 to June 2017, and also held the position as a business partner at Halfon Properties Group with Rodeo Realty Beverly Hills. From April 2014 to June 2016, she was a real estate sales agent at Rodeo Realty, Inc. In addition to acting and producing, Fianna currently works with single-family developments, partnering up and purchasing tear-downs and fixer-uppers, remodeling and building, and designing single-family spec homes. She is presently licensed at Douglas Elliman Real Estate in the West Los Angeles Hills area.

== Filmography ==
Fianna's projects in addition to The Bay include Destination X: California, an extreme action sports and travel program where Fianna traveled the world. She is also a producer on Visions: The Art of Catherine Andrews, an insightful documentary exploring the paintings and music of Catherine Andrews. Fianna's acting credits include a series regular role as "Tamara Garrett" on the digital drama series The Bay, and in a supporting role as "Lily Laudenslager" in the Indie Series Award-winning episodic dramedy A Place Called Hollywood.

=== Producer credits ===
- The Bay (Producer – 55 episodes, 2010 – 2014. Co-executive Producer – 32 episodes, 2017 – 2020. Co-producer, 14 episodes, 2015 – 2016)
- The Bay: COVID-19 Special Fundraiser American Red Cross (Executive producer – 2020)
- yA (Co-executive producer – 10 episodes, 2020)
- The Agency (Producer – 2018)
- This Just In (Producer – 4 episodes, 2016 – 2017)
- Ultra Sultra (Consulting producer – 2017)
- A Mini Movie (Co-producer – 2016)
- Visions: The Art of Catherine Andrews (Producer – 2011)
- Destination X: California (Producer – 6 episodes, 2008)

=== Actor credits ===
- The Fortress 2' (Annette – Pre-production)
- Savage Salvation (Receptionist – 2022)
- Midnight in the Switchgrass (Waitress – 2021)
- The Bay (Tamara Garrett / Hazel – 2011 – 2020)
- A Place Called Hollywood (Lily Laudenslager – 2019)
- The Agency (Simone – 2018)
- A Mini Movie (Desire – 2016)
- The Southside (TV Newscaster voice – 2015)
- Aliens from Uranus (Susan – 2012)
- Getting That Girl (Punk girl – 2011)
- Abay vs. Vegas (Jogger No. 1 – 2010)
- The Dream of Alvareen (Clarissa – 2009)

=== Writer credits ===
- A Mini Movie – 2016

== Awards and nominations ==
Year	Award	Category	Series	Result	Ref
2021	Daytime Emmy Awards	Outstanding Digital Drama Series	The Bay	Nominated	
2020	Indie Series Awards (ISA)	Best Supporting Actress – Drama	The Bay	Nominated	
2020	Daytime Emmy Awards	Outstanding Digital Drama Series	The Bay	Won	
2019	Daytime Emmy Awards	Outstanding Digital Daytime Drama Series	The Bay	Nominated	
2018	Daytime Emmy Awards	Outstanding Digital Daytime Drama Series	The Bay	Won	
2017	Daytime Emmy Awards	Outstanding Digital Daytime Drama Series	The Bay	Won	
2017	Daytime Emmy Awards	Outstanding Children's or Family Viewing Series	This Just In	Nominated	
2016	Best Short – Burbank International Film Festival	New Media	The Bay	Won	
2016	Daytime Emmy Awards	Outstanding Digital Daytime Drama Series	The Bay	Won	
2016	HollyWeb Festival Award	Best Online Soap	The Bay	Won	
2015	Daytime Emmy Awards	Outstanding New Approaches – Drama Series	The Bay	Won	
