= Jack Rio =

Jack Rio may refer to:

- Jack Del Rio (born 1963), American football coach
- Jack Rio (film), a 2008 film
