= Celenza =

Celenza may refer to:

- Celenza, Italian surname
- Celenza sul Trigno, populated place in Abruzzo, Italy
- Celenza Valfortore, populated place in Apulia, Italy

== See also ==
- Cerenzia
