= The Bay (web series) =

Crime drama

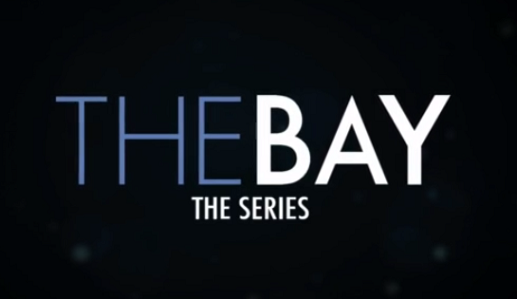
- Genre: Drama; Crime drama; Romance; Thriller; Action-adventure
- Created by: Gregori J. Martin
- Written by: Gregori J. Martin; Wendy Riche
- Directed by: Gregori J. Martin
- Starring: Kristos Andrews; Karrueche Tran; Eric Nelsen; A Martinez; Maxwell Caulfield; Celeste Fianna; Kiara Liz Ortega; Jacklyn Zeman; Mary Beth Evans; Ronn Moss; Brandon Beemer
- Country of origin: United States
- Original language: English
- No. of seasons: 10
- No. of episodes: 138

Production
- Executive producers: Gregori J. Martin; Kristos Andrews; Wendy Riche; Precious Mayes
- Producers: Karrueche Tran; Mary Beth Evans; Eric Nelsen; Sainty Nelsen; Meadow Williams; Nanxi Liu; Pras Michel; Ronn Moss; Devin DeVasquez
- Cinematography: Will Barratt; Matthias Schubert
- Running time: 20-30 minutes
- Production company: LANY Entertainment

Original release
- Network: Blip.tv
- Release: September 15, 2010 – December 30, 2014
- Network: Vimeo
- Release: December 1, 2015 – November 29, 2016
- Network: Tubi
- Release: October 24, 2017 – November 16, 2023
- Network: Popstar! TV
- Release: December 11, 2023 – present

The Bay is an American crime-drama series. The show streams on Peacock and Tubi/Popstar! TV in the United States, 10 Play in Australia, and SABC in South Africa.

Starring Kristos Andrews as the rugged and protective "golden boy" Pete Garrett, and Mary Beth Evans as his wealthy socialite matriarch, Sara Garrett, the series was created by Gregori J. Martin. It is set in the posh seaside town of Bay City, where the privileged residents are entangled in one scandal, betrayal or love affair after the other.

The Bay has garnered a total of twenty-three Daytime Emmy Award wins along with a total of 64 Emmy nominations, as of 2025.

== Plot ==
The Garretts rule the social set of Bay City, where passions run high, scandals run deep, and every relationship can be shockingly deadly.

== Cast ==
=== Current ===
- Kristos Andrews as Pete Garrett / Adam Kenway (seasons 6–10)
- Celeste Fianna as Tamara Garrett
- Eric Nelsen as Daniel Garrett
- Brandon Beemer as Evan Blackwell
- Tristan Rogers as Commissioner Lex Martin
- Taylor Stanley as Zoey Johnson
- Karrueche Tran as Vivian Johnson
- Alicia Leigh Willis as Avery Garrett
- A Martinez as Nardo Ramos (season 2–present; recurring season 1)
- Kiara Liz Ortega as Dre Collins (season 7–present)
- Maxwell Caulfield as Sir Thomas Kenway (season 8–present)
- Bastiano Ferrari as Kamran Hasanova (season 9–present)
- Tristan Mack Wilds as Will Campbell (season 9–present)
- Max Ehrich (since season 10)

=== Previous ===
- Dylan Bruce as Brian Garrett (pre-season)
- Terri Ivens as Orchid (seasons 1–6)
- Jade Harlow as Lianna Ramos (seasons 1–6)
- Ronn Moss as John Blackwell (seasons 1–6)
- Jacklyn Zeman as Sofia Madison (seasons 1–7)
- Mary Beth Evans as Sara Garrett (seasons 1–8)
- Mike Manning as Caleb McKinnon (seasons 4–10)

== Episodes ==
Season	Episodes	Originally released		
Season	Episodes	First released	Last released	Network
The Beginning, Part 1	5	September 15, 2010	February 24, 2011	Blip.tv
Far from the Bay		June 23, 2011		Blip.tv
The Beginning, Part 2	4	October 27, 2011	June 21, 2012	Blip.tv
HoliBays		November 23, 2011		Blip.tv
Darkside of the Bay		August 9, 2012		Blip.tv
1	14	December 5, 2013	December 30, 2014	Blip.tv
2	14	December 1, 2015	November 29, 2016	Vimeo
3	14	October 24, 2017	November 28, 2017	Tubi
4	10	December 28, 2018	August 15, 2019	Tubi
5	10	December 30, 2019	September 8, 2020	Tubi
6	10	November 3, 2020	December 29, 2020	Tubi
7	14	December 19, 2022	November 16, 2023	Tubi
8	14	December 11, 2023	December 29, 2023	Popstar! TV
Valentine Special		February 14, 2024		Popstar! TV
9	14	December 9, 2024	December 31, 2024	Popstar! TV
10	14	December 9, 2025	December 30, 2025	Popstar! TV

=== The Beginning, Part 1 (2010–11) ===
No.	Title	Original release date
1	Chapter One	September 15, 2010
2	Chapter Two	October 27, 2010
3	Chapter Three	December 9, 2010
4	Chapter Four	February 10, 2011
5	Chapter Five	February 24, 2011

=== The Beginning: Far from the Bay (2011) ===
No.	Title	Original release date
6	"Far from the Bay"	June 23, 2011

=== The Beginning, Part 2 (2011–12) ===
No.	Title	Original release date
7	Chapter Six	October 27, 2011
8	Chapter Seven	December 8, 2011
9	Chapter Eight	April 26, 2012
10	Chapter Nine	June 21, 2012

=== Season 1 (2013–14) ===
No. overall	No. in season	Title	Original release date
11	1	"The Garretts of Bay City"	December 5, 2013
12	2	"Caught in the Act"	December 12, 2013
13	3	"Rude Awakenings"	December 19, 2013
14	4	"Dirty Business"	May 1, 2014
15	5	"The Truth Hurts"	May 8, 2014
16	6	"Party Crashers"	May 15, 2014
17	7	"The Morning After"	May 22, 2014
18	8	"Questions and Quandaries"	December 4, 2014
19	9	"The Curse"	December 4, 2014
20	10	"Tragedy"	December 9, 2014
21	11	"Living in Denial"	December 11, 2014
22	12	"Marley's Funeral: The Arrival (1)"	December 16, 2014
23	13	"Marley's Funeral: Revelations (2)"	December 23, 2014
24	14	"The Arrest"	December 30, 2014

=== Season 2 (2015–16) ===
No. overall	No. in season	Title	Original release date
25	1	"Money Talks"	December 1, 2015
26	2	"A Shocking Proposal"	December 1, 2015
27	3	"Wash Away the Pain"	December 3, 2015
28	4	"Intruders"	December 8, 2015
29	5	"Surprise! Surprise!"	December 10, 2015
30	6	"The Cost of Love"	December 15, 2015
31	7	"Unholy Matrimony"	December 17, 2015
32	8	"Mayhem"	December 22, 2015
33	9	"The Aftermath"	November 29, 2016
34	10	"Disclosures"	November 29, 2016
35	11	"Jack's Road to Redemption (1)"	November 29, 2016
36	12	"Jack's Road to Redemption (2)"	November 29, 2016
37	13	"Love and War"	November 29, 2016
38	14	"A New Beginning"	November 29, 2016

=== Season 3 (2017) ===
No. overall	No. in season	Title	Original release date
39	1	"The Return"	October 24, 2017
40	2	"Gossip Town"	October 24, 2017
41	3	"It Begins"	October 24, 2017
42	4	"What Happened That Day?"	October 24, 2017
43	5	"Witnesses"	October 24, 2017
44	6	"Music to My Ears"	October 24, 2017
45	7	"Sex, Lies & Tequila"	October 31, 2017
46	8	"No Regrets"	October 31, 2017
47	9	"For Love & Money"	November 14, 2017
48	10	"Secrets"	November 14, 2017
49	11	"Beach Babes & Brawls"	November 14, 2017
50	12	"Unveiled"	November 14, 2017
51	13	"The Stand"	November 21, 2017
52	14	"Hello & Goodbye"	November 28, 2017

=== Season 4 (2018–19) ===
No. overall	No. in season	Title	Original release date
53	1	"Deliver Us"	December 28, 2018
54	2	"The Visitor"	December 28, 2018
55	3	"Unlawful"	December 28, 2018
56	4	"Family Feuds"	December 28, 2018
57	5	"Scandalous"	December 28, 2018
58	6	"Bag of Tricks"	August 15, 2019
59	7	"International Players (1)"	August 15, 2019
60	8	"International Players (2)"	August 15, 2019
61	9	"The Smog"	August 15, 2019
62	10	"Home Is Where the War Is"	August 15, 2019

=== Season 5 (2019–20) ===
No. overall	No. in season	Title	Original release date
63	1	"Searching for Sara"	December 30, 2019
64	2	"Breaking"	December 30, 2019
65	3	"The Getaway"	December 30, 2019
66	4	"Shell-Shocked"	December 30, 2019
67	5	"Naked Truth"	December 31, 2019
68	6	"The Bequest"	December 31, 2019
69	7	"Laying Down the Law"	September 1, 2020
70	8	"A Good Fight"	September 1, 2020
71	9	"Turks and Caicos (1)"	September 8, 2020
72	10	"Turks and Caicos (2)"	September 8, 2020

=== Season 6 (2020) ===
No. overall	No. in season	Title	Original release date
73	1	"Ten Year Anniversary (1)"	November 3, 2020
74	2	"Ten Year Anniversary (2)"	November 3, 2020
75	3	"Uncharted Territory"	November 10, 2020
76	4	"A Bolt from the Blue"	November 17, 2020
77	5	"Probing"	November 24, 2020
78	6	"Invaders"	December 1, 2020
79	7	"Cry Havoc"	December 8, 2020
80	8	"A Pitched Battle"	December 15, 2020
81	9	"Auld Lang Syne (1)"	December 22, 2020
82	10	"Auld Lang Syne (2)"	December 29, 2020

=== Season 7 (2022–23) ===
No. overall	No. in season	Title	Original release date
83	1	"State of Emergency"	December 19, 2022
84	2	"The Messengers"	December 20, 2022
85	3	"In Between"	December 21, 2022
86	4	"No Time To Rest"	December 22, 2022
87	5	"Eye of The Storm"	December 23, 2022
88	6	"Familia Connection"	December 26, 2022
89	7	"The Proposal"	December 27, 2022
90	8	"Puzzle Pieces"	December 28, 2022
91	9	"Trust No One"	December 29, 2022
92	10	"Games Monsters Play"	December 31, 2022
93	11	"Telltale Signs"	November 13, 2023
94	12	"The Voyage"	November 14, 2023
95	13	"Here Comes the Bride"	November 15, 2023
96	14	"The Culmination"	November 16, 2023

=== Season 8 (2023) ===
No. overall	No. in season	Title	Original stream date
97	1	"Serenity Place"	December 11, 2023
98	2	"The Trauma Ward"	December 12, 2023
99	3	"The Meeting of the Minds"	December 13, 2023
100	4	"The Hundreth"	December 14, 2023
101	5	"Adam's Lair"	December 15, 2023
102	6	"His Achilles Heel"	December 18, 2023
103	7	"Better Safe Than Sorry"	December 19, 2023
104	8	"Unsolicited"	December 20, 2023
105	9	"A Master Plan"	December 21, 2023
106	10	"Inamorato"	December 22, 2023
107	11	"Veni, Vidi, Vici (1)"	December 26, 2023
108	12	"Veni, Vidi, Vici (2)"	December 27, 2023
109	13	"Closing In"	December 28, 2023
110	14	"Dearly Departed"	December 29, 2023

=== Season 9 (2024) ===
No. overall	No. in season	Title	Original stream date
111	1	"Dead of Night"	December 9, 2024
112	2	"Step by Step"	December 10, 2024
113	3	"Let's Make a Deal"	December 11, 2024
114	4	"No Love Lost"	December 12, 2024
115	5	"Family Ties"	December 13, 2024
116	6	"Truth Be Told"	December 17, 2024
117	7	"Inroads"	December 18, 2024
118	8	"Bite the Bullet"	December 18, 2024
119	9	"Prisoner at the Bar"	December 20, 2024
120	10	"Paradox"	December 23, 2024
121	11	"Infringe Upon"	December 26, 2024
122	12	"Sofia"	December 27, 2024
123	13	"A Dance with the Devil"	December 30, 2024
124	14	"The Great Escape"	December 31, 2024

=== Season 10 (2025) ===
No. overall	No. in season	Title	Original stream date
125	1	"Obsequies"	December 9, 2025
Bay City residents celebrate Daniel's life. Pete and Vivian learn shocking news from Dr. Campbell.
126	2	"Hopes and Prayers"	December 10, 2025
At Daniel's memorial, Caleb has a surprise confrontation with Craig. Nardo gives Pete an update on Adam. Tamara makes a new discovery. RJ and Vivian get into a heated argument.
127	3	"A Mother's Day Gift"	December 11, 2025
It's Mother's Day. Vivian receives the news. Tamara realizes her baby may not be Evan's. Nardo and Pete discuss Adam's next steps while Adam continues his manipulation tactics from behind bars.
128	4	"Checkmate"	December 12, 2025
Adam finds new allies in prison. Xander learns a big lesson from the Bay City Denizens. The McKinnons meet for a tense lunch with a special guest. Caleb begins to open up.
129	5	"Death Is a Point of View"	December 15, 2025
Caleb "sees" Daniel. Colton offers new evidence in Daniel's death. Justin gets an unexpected visitor at Romantica. Belinda gets a surprise visit. Dre comes face to face with Adam.
130	6	"Sacred Secrets"	December 16, 2025
Chase's release haunts Lillie. Tamara learns who's the father. RJ interrupts Xander and Jazzy with some life-changing news, as Nick and Caleb's bond grows stronger.
131	7	"While There Is Life, There Is Hope"	December 17, 2025
Pete goes on a journey to save Vivian. Nardo pays Belinda a visit. Jazzy sets up her first big interview with RJ. Nardo has a surprise confrontation and a meeting on the docks.
132	8	"Reflections"	December 18, 2025
Nick and Caleb address their relationship. Colleen and Violet deal with unexpected visitors. Lillie and Frankie break new ground. Sir Thomas and Richard plan their next steps.
133	9	"Beneath the Surface"	December 19, 2025
Vivian receives her transplant. Tamara's pregnancy is exposed to one too many people. Nick exposes Chase's secret while Lillie continues to fall off the deep end. Justin receives news.
134	10	"Last Breath of Innocence"	December 22, 2025
Adam makes unexpected allies in prison. Vivian and Pete receive a warm welcome. Wesley prepares Nick for his big meeting. Nick and Patty must face a devastating discovery.
135	11	"World's Collide"	December 23, 2025
Colton confronts Tamara. Lillie receives a surprise visitor. Sir Thomas pays a visit to Adam in prison. Caleb tells Nick about the mysterious texts. Pete learns the truth about Vivian.
136	12	"Beyond the Wreckage"	December 26, 2025
Tamara and Wesley are rushed to the hospital. Justin pulls out of the development project. Sequoia's efforts to get between Maeve and Justin are foiled. Evan and Colton in a heated standoff.
137	13	"It All Unfolds"	December 29, 2025
Nardo presents new evidence to Evan. Xander takes Regan and Frankie on an unexpected detour. Tamara has surprise visitors. Belinda shares her worries with Sir. Thomas. Dre meets with Adam. Pete learns about Colleen's past.
138	14	"Let's Play Ball"	December 30, 2025
Nick plans his proposal at the Denizens' season opener. Adam executes his prison escape.

== Casting ==
Created by Martin, The Bay was announced in May 2010, with Tristan Rogers, Lilly Melgar, John Callahan and Sandra Robinson attached to star. Days later, We Love Soaps reported that Mary Beth Evans had been cast as the lead female, Sara Garrett. Matthew Ashford was added in July as Steve Jensen, Sara's rapist and the father of her eldest child, Brian. By August 2010, Dylan Bruce had been cast as Brian, and Martha Madison as Sara's daughter Marly. Around the same time, Rogers' character was identified as Police Commissioner Lex Martin, who shares a past with Sara, and Melgar was noted to be playing Janice Ramos, Sara's fiery nemesis.

From the beginning, the series has featured many notable American film and television actors in its regular and guest cast. In 2011, Evans and her character Sara made a crossover appearance on the web series Pretty.

== Production and broadcast ==
Martin executive produces with Wendy Riche and Kristos Andrews, who also stars as Sara's son, Pete Garrett.

Premiering at Blip.tv on September 15, 2010, the first half of the pre-season entitled "The Beginning" included five episodes released in four parts each, as well as an eight part episode Summer Special 2011 called Far From The Bay. In February 2011, Jim Romanovich of Associated Television International announced plans to repackage the series into 30-minute episodes and pitch it to cable networks and key local TV stations.

The second half of "The Beginning" premiered on October 27, 2011, comprising four episodes as four clips each, as well as an eight part Thanksgiving Special called HoliBays, and a five part Summer Special 2012 called Darkside of The Bay. In August 2013, Blip.tv was acquired by Maker Studios.

Season one premiered on December 5, 2013. Maker Studios shut down Blip.tv on August 20, 2015, and redirected it to Maker.tv.

In September 2015, Martin announced eight new installments for a forthcoming season two. The second season premiered on Vimeo on December 1, 2015, with the eighth episode airing on December 22. Production resumed in May 2016 on the final six episodes of the season. The Bay is available for streaming in a limited capacity at thebaytheseries.com.

=== Amazon Prime ===
In April 2015, Soap Opera Digest reported that episodes of The Bay would be re-released on Amazon Prime in summer 2016 as two 14-episode seasons. According to Martin, they will be "remastered episodes with never before seen footage, [and] the show will have a new starting point." A 14-episode first season was made available for streaming starting September 6, 2016. A second season of 14 digitally remastered episodes including "brand-new, never-before-seen episodes" was released on November 29, 2016. Wendy Riche joined the production as a writer for the Amazon season 2, becoming an executive producer for the second half of the season. A third season was in production with Martin, Andrews, and Riche as executive producers and set for release in spring 2017.

== Reception ==
In December 2010, Martin was named by We Love Soaps as one of the 15 Most Fascinating People of 2010 for his work on the series. Michael Logan of TV Guide noted The Bay's "terrific reviews" in 2011. Writing for Entertainment Weekly, Alina Adams named the series one of the "4 best soap operas on the web" in 2015.

=== Awards and recognition ===
The Bay won a 2015 Daytime Emmy Award for Outstanding New Approaches Drama Series. Along with Martin and Andrews as executive producers, the winning team included Supervising Producer Nadine Aronson, Coordinating Producer Carol C. Hedgepeth and producers Anthony Aquilino, Braxton Davis, Devin DeVasquez, Mary Beth Evans, Celeste Fianna, Jade Harlow, Lilly Melgar, Ronn Moss, Eric Nelsen, Sainty Nelsen, Jared Safier, Derrell Whitt, and Salvatore V. Zannino. The series was previously nominated in 2012 for Outstanding Special Class Short Format Daytime.

In 2016, The Bay received a Daytime Emmy nomination for Outstanding Digital Daytime Drama Series. Mary Beth Evans, Lilly Melgar and Patsy Pease were nominated for Outstanding Actress in a Digital Daytime Drama Series for their roles, and Kristos Andrews was nominated for Outstanding Actor in a Digital Daytime Drama Series. The Bay won for Outstanding Digital Series, and Evans and Andrews won in the performer categories. The Bay was nominated for Outstanding Digital Daytime Drama Series again in 2017, with Evans and Melgar nominated in the renamed category Outstanding Lead Actress in a Digital Daytime Drama Series and Andrews nominated in the renamed Outstanding Lead Actor in a Digital Daytime Drama Series. Carolyn Hennesy, Jade Harlow, and Kym Whitley were nominated in the newly created category Outstanding Supporting or Guest Actress in a Digital Daytime Drama Series, and Nicolas Coster, Matthew Ashford, and Ronn Moss were nominated in the newly created category Outstanding Supporting or Guest Actor in a Digital Daytime Drama Series. The Bay won Outstanding Digital Series, and swept the performer categories with wins for Evans, Andrews, Hennesy, and Coster. The series earned 15 nominations in 2018, winning Outstanding Digital Daytime Drama Series, and Outstanding Directing in a Digital Drama Series, as well as performer Emmys for Andrews (Outstanding Lead Actor in a Digital Drama Series), Harlow (Outstanding Supporting Actress in a Digital Daytime Drama Series), Eric Nelsen (Outstanding Supporting Actor in a Digital Daytime Drama Series), and Patrika Darbo (Outstanding Guest Performer in a Digital Daytime Drama Series). Darbo's award was later revoked due to a submission error. In 2021, longtime castmember Karrueche Tran, who is of African American and Asian descent, became the first AAPI lead actress Emmy in either the Daytime or Primetime Emmys for her performance on "The Bay."

To date, the series has won 11 Indie Series Awards, and has been nominated for several more. In 2017, the series earned a record 21 Indie Series Award nominations.

In 2023, The Bay received three Daytime Emmy nominations for Outstanding Drama Series, Writing for a Drama Series, and Directing for a Drama Series.

List of Awards
Year	Award	Category	Nominee(s)	Result	Ref.
2011	2nd Indie Soap Awards	Outstanding Directing	Gregori J. Martin	Won	
2011	2nd Indie Soap Awards	Fan's Choice Award	—N/a	Won	
2011	2nd Indie Soap Awards	Outstanding Lead Actor	Camden Toy	Nominated	
2011	2nd Indie Soap Awards	Outstanding Ensemble	—N/a	Nominated	
2011	2nd Indie Soap Awards	Best Storyline	"Igor's revenge"	Nominated	
2012	39th Daytime Creative Arts Emmy Awards	Outstanding Special Class Short Format Daytime	Gregori J. Martin, Kristos Andrews and Derrell Whitt	Nominated	
2012	3rd Indie Soap Awards	Best Crossover	Michael O'Leary (The Bay & Steamboat)	Won	
2012	3rd Indie Soap Awards	Best Crossover	Mary Beth Evans (Pretty & The Bay)	Nominated	
2012	3rd Indie Soap Awards	Fan's Choice Award	—N/a	Won	
2012	3rd Indie Soap Awards	Best Directing – Drama	Gregori J. Martin	Nominated	
2012	3rd Indie Soap Awards	Best Supporting Actor – Drama	Nicolas Coster	Nominated	
2012	3rd Indie Soap Awards	Best Supporting Actor – Drama	Derrell Whitt	Nominated	
2012	3rd Indie Soap Awards	Best Ensemble – Drama	—N/a	Nominated	
2012	3rd Indie Soap Awards	Best Guest Appearance – Drama	Anna Holbrook	Nominated	
2012	3rd Indie Soap Awards	Best Guest Appearance – Drama	Ilene Kristen	Nominated	
2012	3rd Indie Soap Awards	Best Breakout Performance	Kristos Andrews	Nominated	
2012	3rd Indie Soap Awards	Best Cinematography	Matthias Schubert, Gareth Taylor and Andre Lomov	Nominated	
2014	5th Indie Series Awards	Best Ensemble – Drama	—N/a	Nominated	
2014	5th Indie Series Awards	Best Makeup	Eric Kirker, Renonda Bray, Dre Lamparello and Anna Habrat	Nominated	
2015	42nd Daytime Creative Arts Emmy Awards	Outstanding New Approaches Drama Series	Gregori J. Martin, Kristos Andrews, Nadine Aronson, Carol C. Hedgepeth, Anthony Aquilino, Braxton Davis, Devin DeVasquez, Mary Beth Evans, Celeste Fianna, Jade Harlow, Lilly Melgar, Ronn Moss, Eric Nelsen, Sainty Nelsen, Jared Safier, Derrell Whitt and Salvatore V. Zannino	Won	
2015	6th Indie Series Awards	Best Lead Actress – Drama	Lilly Melgar	Nominated	
2015	6th Indie Series Awards	Best Guest Actor – Drama	Charles Shaughnessy	Nominated	
2015	6th Indie Series Awards	Best Guest Actress – Drama	Patrika Darbo	Nominated	
2015	6th Indie Series Awards	Best Makeup	Ren Bray	Nominated	
2016	43rd Daytime Creative Arts Emmy Awards	Outstanding Digital Daytime Drama Series	Kristos Andrews, Gregori J. Martin, Anthony Aquilino, Michael W. Ferro, Jr., Jared Safier, Carol C. Hedgepeth, Matthew Ashford, Devin DeVasquez, Mary Beth Evans, Celeste Fianna, Jade Harlow, Lilly Melgar, Ronn Moss, Kira Reed Lorsch, Karrueche Tran, Salvatore Zannino, and Chrystal Ayers	Won	
2016	43rd Daytime Creative Arts Emmy Awards	Outstanding Actress in a Digital Daytime Drama Series	Mary Beth Evans	Won	
2016	43rd Daytime Creative Arts Emmy Awards	Outstanding Actress in a Digital Daytime Drama Series	Lilly Melgar	Nominated	
2016	43rd Daytime Creative Arts Emmy Awards	Outstanding Actress in a Digital Daytime Drama Series	Patsy Pease	Nominated	
2016	43rd Daytime Creative Arts Emmy Awards	Outstanding Actor in a Digital Daytime Drama Series	Kristos Andrews	Won	
2016	7th Indie Series Awards	Best Lead Actress – Drama	Lilly Melgar	Won	
2016	7th Indie Series Awards	Best Guest Actress – Drama	Kym Whitley	Won	
2016	7th Indie Series Awards	Best Web Series – Drama		Nominated	
2016	7th Indie Series Awards	Best Directing – Drama	Gregori J. Martin	Nominated	
2016	7th Indie Series Awards	Best Supporting Actor – Drama	Tristan Rogers	Nominated	
2016	7th Indie Series Awards	Best Supporting Actress – Drama	Karrueche Tran	Nominated	
2016	7th Indie Series Awards	Best Guest Actor – Drama	Eric Martsolf	Nominated	
2016	7th Indie Series Awards	Best Guest Actress – Drama	Patsy Pease	Nominated	
2016	7th Indie Series Awards	Best Ensemble – Drama		Nominated	
2016	7th Indie Series Awards	Best Cinematography	Matthias Schubert	Nominated	
2016	7th Indie Series Awards	Best Makeup	Ren Bray	Nominated	
2017	44th Daytime Creative Arts Emmy Awards	Outstanding Digital Daytime Drama Series	Gregori J. Martin, Wendy Riche, Kristos Andrews, Anthony Aquillino, Michael W. Ferro Jr., Carol C. Hedgepeth, Nadine Aronson, Jared Safier, Matthew Ashford, Devin Devasquez, Mary Beth Evans, Celeste Fianna, Kira Reed Lorsch, Ronn Moss, Eric Nelsen, Sainty Nelsen, Karrueche Tran, Meadow Williams, Chrystal Ayers	Won	
2017	44th Daytime Creative Arts Emmy Awards	Outstanding Lead Actress in a Digital Daytime Drama Series	Mary Beth Evans	Won	
2017	44th Daytime Creative Arts Emmy Awards	Outstanding Lead Actress in a Digital Daytime Drama Series	Lilly Melgar	Nominated	
2017	44th Daytime Creative Arts Emmy Awards	Outstanding Lead Actor in a Digital Daytime Drama Series	Kristos Andrews	Won	
2017	44th Daytime Creative Arts Emmy Awards	Outstanding Supporting or Guest Actress in a Digital Daytime Drama Series	Carolyn Hennesy	Won	
2017	44th Daytime Creative Arts Emmy Awards	Outstanding Supporting or Guest Actress in a Digital Daytime Drama Series	Jade Harlow	Nominated	
2017	44th Daytime Creative Arts Emmy Awards	Outstanding Supporting or Guest Actress in a Digital Daytime Drama Series	Kym Whitley	Nominated	
2017	44th Daytime Creative Arts Emmy Awards	Outstanding Supporting or Guest Actor in a Digital Daytime Drama Series	Nicolas Coster	Won	
2017	44th Daytime Creative Arts Emmy Awards	Outstanding Supporting or Guest Actor in a Digital Daytime Drama Series	Matthew Ashford	Nominated	
2017	44th Daytime Creative Arts Emmy Awards	Outstanding Supporting or Guest Actor in a Digital Daytime Drama Series	Ronn Moss	Nominated	
2017	8th Indie Series Awards	Best Web Series — Drama	—N/a	Won	
2017	8th Indie Series Awards	Best Guest Actress — Drama	Carolyn Hennesy	Won	
2017	8th Indie Series Awards	Best Ensemble — Drama	—N/a	Won	
2017	8th Indie Series Awards	Best Production Design	Sarah Asaly	Won	
2017	8th Indie Series Awards	Best Makeup	Ren Bray	Won	
2017	8th Indie Series Awards	Best Directing — Drama	Gregori J. Martin	Nominated	
2017	8th Indie Series Awards	Best Writing — Drama	Gregori J. Martin & Wendy Riche	Nominated	
2017	8th Indie Series Awards	Best Lead Actor — Drama	Kristos Andrews	Nominated	
2017	8th Indie Series Awards	Best Lead Actress — Drama	Mary Beth Evans	Nominated	
2017	8th Indie Series Awards	Best Lead Actress — Drama	Lilly Melgar	Nominated	
2017	8th Indie Series Awards	Best Supporting Actor — Drama	Matthew Ashford	Nominated	
2017	8th Indie Series Awards	Best Supporting Actor — Drama	Nicolas Coster	Nominated	
2017	8th Indie Series Awards	Best Supporting Actress — Drama	Jade Harlow	Nominated	
2017	8th Indie Series Awards	Best Supporting Actress — Drama	Karrueche Tran	Nominated	
2017	8th Indie Series Awards	Best Guest Actor — Drama	Brandon Beemer	Nominated	
2017	8th Indie Series Awards	Best Guest Actor — Drama	Kevin Spirtas	Nominated	
2017	8th Indie Series Awards	Best Guest Actress — Drama	Patrika Darbo	Nominated	
2017	8th Indie Series Awards	Best Guest Actress — Drama	Kym Whitley	Nominated	
2017	8th Indie Series Awards	Best Costume Design	Marquita Lopez	Nominated	
2017	8th Indie Series Awards	Best Editing	Jeremy Snider & Tiffany Petitt	Nominated	
2017	8th Indie Series Awards	Best Cinematography	Matthias Schubert	Nominated	
2018	45th Daytime Emmy Awards	Outstanding Digital Daytime Drama Series	—N/a	Won	
2018	45th Daytime Creative Arts Emmy Awards	Outstanding Lead Actress in a Digital Daytime Drama Series	Mary Beth Evans	Nominated	
2018	45th Daytime Creative Arts Emmy Awards	Outstanding Lead Actress in a Digital Daytime Drama Series	Lilly Melgar	Nominated	
2018	45th Daytime Creative Arts Emmy Awards	Outstanding Lead Actor in a Digital Daytime Drama Series	Kristos Andrews	Won	
2018	45th Daytime Creative Arts Emmy Awards	Outstanding Supporting Actress in a Digital Daytime Drama Series	Jade Harlow	Won	
2018	45th Daytime Creative Arts Emmy Awards	Outstanding Supporting Actress in a Digital Daytime Drama Series	Terri Ivens	Nominated	
2018	45th Daytime Creative Arts Emmy Awards	Outstanding Supporting Actress in a Digital Daytime Drama Series	Kira Reed	Nominated	
2018	45th Daytime Creative Arts Emmy Awards	Outstanding Supporting Actor in a Digital Daytime Drama Series	Brandon Beemer	Nominated	
2018	45th Daytime Creative Arts Emmy Awards	Outstanding Supporting Actor in a Digital Daytime Drama Series	Eric Nelsen	Won	
2018	45th Daytime Creative Arts Emmy Awards	Outstanding Supporting Actor in a Digital Daytime Drama Series	Derrell Whitt	Nominated	
2018	45th Daytime Creative Arts Emmy Awards	Outstanding Guest Performer in a Digital Daytime Drama Series	Thomas Calabro	Nominated	
2018	45th Daytime Creative Arts Emmy Awards	Outstanding Guest Performer in a Digital Daytime Drama Series	Patrika Darbo	Revoked	
2018	45th Daytime Creative Arts Emmy Awards	Outstanding Guest Performer in a Digital Daytime Drama Series	Chad Duell	Nominated	
2018	45th Daytime Creative Arts Emmy Awards	Outstanding Writing in a Digital Drama Series	—N/a	Nominated	
2018	45th Daytime Creative Arts Emmy Awards	Outstanding Directing in a Digital Drama Series	Gregori Martin	Won	
2020	47th Daytime Emmy Awards	Outstanding Digital Daytime Drama Series	—N/a	Won	
2020	47th Daytime Creative Arts Emmy Awards	Outstanding Lead Actress in a Digital Daytime Drama Series	Mary Beth Evans	Nominated	
2020	47th Daytime Creative Arts Emmy Awards	Outstanding Lead Actress in a Digital Daytime Drama Series	Jade Harlow	Won	
2020	47th Daytime Creative Arts Emmy Awards	Outstanding Lead Actor in a Digital Daytime Drama Series	Kristos Andrews	Won	
2020	47th Daytime Creative Arts Emmy Awards	Outstanding Writing in a Digital Drama Series	—N/a	Nominated	
2020	47th Daytime Creative Arts Emmy Awards	Outstanding Directing in a Digital Drama Series	Gregori J. Martin & Kristos Andrews	Won	
2020	47th Daytime Creative Arts Emmy Awards	Outstanding Costume Design for a Drama or Digital Drama Series	Gabrielle Sciabbarrasi	Nominated	
2021	48th Daytime Emmy Awards	Outstanding Limited Drama Series	—N/a	Nominated	
2021	48th Daytime Creative Arts Emmy Awards	Outstanding Younger Performer in a Daytime Fiction Program	Bianca D'Ambrosio	Nominated	
2021	48th Daytime Creative Arts Emmy Awards	Outstanding Younger Performer in a Daytime Fiction Program	Chiara D'Ambrosio	Won	
2021	48th Daytime Creative Arts Emmy Awards	Outstanding Performance By a Lead Actor in a Daytime Fiction Program	Kristos Andrews	Won	
2021	48th Daytime Creative Arts Emmy Awards	Outstanding Performance by a Lead Actress in a Daytime Fiction Program	Karrueche Tran	Won	
2021	48th Daytime Creative Arts Emmy Awards	Outstanding Performance by a Lead Actress in a Daytime Fiction Program	Jade Harlow	Nominated	
2021	48th Daytime Creative Arts Emmy Awards	Outstanding Performance by a Supporting Actor in a Daytime Fiction Program	Mike Manning	Won	
2021	48th Daytime Creative Arts Emmy Awards	Outstanding Performance by a Supporting Actor in a Daytime Fiction Program	Eric Nelsen	Nominated	
2021	48th Daytime Creative Arts Emmy Awards	Outstanding Performance by a Supporting Actress in a Daytime Fiction Program	Alicia Leigh Willis	Nominated	
2021	48th Daytime Creative Arts Emmy Awards	Outstanding Performance by a Supporting Actress in a Daytime Fiction Program	Jacklyn Zeman	Nominated	
2021	48th Daytime Creative Arts Emmy Awards	Outstanding Guest Performer in a Daytime Fiction Program	A Martinez	Nominated	
2021	48th Daytime Creative Arts Emmy Awards	Outstanding Guest Performer in a Daytime Fiction Program	Randy Wayne	Nominated	
2021	48th Daytime Creative Arts Emmy Awards	Outstanding Writing Team for a Daytime Fiction Program	—N/a	Nominated	
2023	50th Daytime Emmy Awards	Outstanding Drama Series	—N/a	Nominated	
2023	50th Daytime Emmy Awards	Writing for a Drama Series	—N/a	Nominated	
2023	50th Daytime Emmy Awards	Directing for a Drama Series	—N/a	Nominated	
2024	51st Daytime Emmy Awards	Outstanding Drama Series	Dante Aleksander, Bastiano Ferrari, Will Barratt, Garrett Burchell, Morganne Clark,Bianca D'Ambrosio, Chiara D'Ambrosio, Paris Dylan, Ryan A. Ellis, Mary Beth Evans, Christian Filippella, Jaime Lee, Nanxi Lui, Audrey Ly, Tania Mamery, Artisha Mann-Cooper, Mike Manning, Tigran Mutafyan, Jack Rosenberg, Matt Taff, Karrueche Tran, Alexander Vatalev, Danielle Vasinova, Evelyn Xu	Nominated	
2024	51st Daytime Emmy Awards	Supporting Actor in a Drama Series	A Martinez	Nominated	
2024	51st Daytime Emmy Awards	Supporting Actor in a Drama Series	Mike Manning	Nominated	
2024	51st Daytime Emmy Awards	Writing for a Drama Series	—N/a	Nominated	
2024	51st Daytime Emmy Awards	Directing for a Drama Series	—N/a	Nominated	
