= Celenza (surname) =

Celenza is a surname. Notable people with the surname include:

- Christopher Celenza (born 1967), American scholar of Renaissance history
- Frankie Celenza (born 1986), American cook and television personality
