= Tastemade =

Video network

Tastemade, Inc.
- Industry: Digital media, web video, entertainment
- Founded: June 2012
- Founder: Larry Fitzgibbon; Joe Perez; Steven Kydd
- Headquarters: Santa Monica, California, U.S.
- Area served: Worldwide
- Services: Multimedia, digital video
- Website: tastemade.com

Tastemade, Inc. is a media company that offers food, travel, and home & design-related programming for online and streaming audiences. Elvina Payne was announced as CFO in June 2024. The company was acquired by Wonder Group in March 2025.

== History ==
Founded in 2012 by Larry Fitzgibbon, Steven Kydd, and Joe Perez in Santa Monica, California, Tastemade is a media company that creates content in the categories of Food, Travel, and Home & Design. Tastemade's content is uploaded to social media sites such as Facebook and Instagram, as well as Tastemade's website, app, and Tastemade+, a subscription service. Over half of Tastemade's views happen on mobile devices and connected TVs.

In July 2015, Facebook began testing a revenue sharing program with its video partners, Tastemade being among them. Tastemade is also part of Facebook's Anthology program, which creates video ads by teaming up advertisers and publishers. In April 2016, Tastemade announced an agreement with Facebook to produce and air 100 Facebook Live shows monthly.

In 2016, Tastemade launched Tastemade Japan, a subsidiary that leverages Tastemade's popularity in the region. In 2020, Tastemade partnered with Mitsui, making Tastemade Japan a joint venture between the two companies.

In 2017, Tastemade opened four new production facilities on three continents including studios in São Paulo, Brazil; London, England; Buenos Aires, Argentina; and Tokyo, Japan.

Amazon MGM Studios and Tastemade signed a multi-year contract in January 2024 to produce unscripted lifestyle content. In February 2024, Pinterest and Tastemade partnered to produce Pinterest's first Live Streaming show.

In May 2024, Tastemade launched a new shoppable home-improvement series, Kitchen Glow Up, using Shopsense.

In November 2024, Tastemade launched a recipe app, Tastemade Cooking, to deepen engagement among Tastemade+ subscribers. The app offers subscribers a library of more than 12,000 Tastemade recipes with accompanying videos.

In March 2025, Wonder, a food delivery company, acquired Tastemade for $90 million.

== Awards ==
In 2014, Tastemade's original program Thirsty For... won a James Beard Award in the New Media category for Video Webcast, Fixed Location and/or Instructional. That same year, The Perennial Plate, a documentary series about sustainable food practices on the Tastemade network, also won a James Beard Award in the New Media category for Video Webcast, on Location. The Grill Iron, a Tastemade travel show about college football tailgating, generated over 5 million total views and was nominated for a James Beard Award in 2015. Later, The Grill Iron became Tastemade's first show to migrate from digital to broadcast television in September 2015. In 2016, Tastemade won a Webby Award in the Online Film & Video category for Documentary Series for its show, Heritage.

In early 2015, Apple added the Tastemade channel to its Apple TV device. That same year, Tastemade was named one of the World's Top 10 Most Innovative Companies by Fast Company.

Tastemade debuted as one of Snapchat's new publishers on its Discover platform in August 2015, producing original food and travel content for the app on a daily basis. The following month, Tastemade's Snapchat Discover channel launched in the United Kingdom and France. Tastemade's Snapchat channel was also nominated for a Webby Award in 2016.

In 2016, Tastemade received a James Beard Award for their series, Uncharted.

Tastemade won an additional James Beard Award in 2020 for their series Broken Bread with Roy Choi.

In March 2021, Tastemade was named one of Fast Company's "Most Innovative Companies" in the category of "Media."

In 2022, Tastemade won the Digiday TV & Video Award for "Best FAST Channel." Later that year, Frankie Celenza, the host of the Tastemade original series, Struggle Meals, won a Daytime Emmy for Outstanding Culinary Host.

In 2023, Tastemade's series "Broken Bread" won three LA Area Emmy Awards.

In 2024, Tastemade programming was nominated for two Daytime Emmy Awards, one for "Street Somm" and one for Sophia Roe as Best Culinary Host on "Counter Space." Also that year, "Street Somm" received a James Beard Media Award nomination. Tastemade also won a 2024 Digiday Media Award for Best of Livestreaming on Amazon Live.

== Funding ==
In 2012, Tastemade raised $5.3 million in series A funding from Redpoint Ventures.

In 2013, the company announced $10 million in series B funding from Raine Ventures and Redpoint Ventures.

In 2014, Tastemade announced $25 million in series C funding, led by Scripps Networks Interactive with participation by Liberty Media Corporation, bringing the startup's total funding to $40 million. In December 2015, Tastemade secured a $40 million Series D funding round led by Goldman Sachs, with participation from existing investors Redpoint Ventures, Raine Ventures, Comcast Ventures, Liberty Media, Scripps Networks Interactive, and Tohokushinsha Film Corporation, bringing the total funding to $80 million. In October 2018, Tastemade closed a $35 million Series E funding round led by Goldman Sachs Growth Equity along with new investors Amazon and Cool Japan Fund, with participation from existing investors including Redpoint Ventures, Raine Ventures, Comcast Ventures, and Liberty Media, bringing total funding to $115 million.

== Network sponsors ==
Tastemade's original programming has attracted sponsors including Constellation Brands, Disney+, Kellogg's, Hellmann's, Heineken, Scotch Brand, Mars, Grey Goose, Stella Artois, Chase, Kraft Foods, General Mills, Hyundai, American Express, Visa, San Pellegrino, Starbucks, Unilever, Realtor.com, and others. Tastemade released the findings of a study commissioned from Nielsen which showed that integrating brands into the content resonated better with viewers. Specifically, the study found that brand integration resulted in much higher brand affinity, perception and recall, and increased purchase intent by 30 percent.

== Streaming ==
In 2014, Tastemade signed a development deal with Ryan Seacrest to create food and lifestyle programming. In 2015, Tastemade hired Julie Nolke to create videos and develop show ideas.

In 2018, Tastemade launched its 24-hour linear streaming channel featuring several hundred hours of original programming. The channel was made available on platforms such as YouTube TV and Philo.

In June 2020, Tastemade and Hyundai partnered on a four-part series on Tastemade's streaming channel called The Un-Adventurers, each episode of which tells the story of a real person who leaves their home state for the first time to embark on a fantasy road trip.

In September 2020, Tastemade launched its second streaming channel, Tastemade en Español, a Spanish-language streaming channel with hundreds of hours of lifestyle programming.

Later that year, Walmart and Tastemade rolled out shoppable streaming content with special episodes of Tastemade's series Struggle Meals which let audiences text an on-screen number to add suggested ingredients to a virtual Walmart shopping cart and place an order for pickup or delivery.

In 2021, Tastemade partnered with Disney to Produce Disney's Magic Bake-Off series on Disney Channel. The 13-episode series was hosted by Disney Channel stars Dara Reneé (High School Musical: The Musical: The Series) and Issac Ryan Brown (Raven's Home).

Later that year, Tastemade launched Tastemade Travel, a streaming channel to showcase the company's travel series. The channel was first available on Samsung TV Plus, Redbox, VIZIO WatchFree+, and IMDb TV, and featured shows such as Luke Nguyen's Street Food Asia and Curtis Stone's Field Trip.

In 2022, Tastemade's series, A New Green Book was announced as a part of YouTube Originals' global slate of Black Voices Fund programming.

Later that year, Tastemade launched Tastemade Home, a new streaming channel with content geared toward homeowners and renters including four new original series, along with Weekend Refresh, hosted by actress Tia Mowry and inspired by Tastemade's social series.

In 2023, Tastemade and Constellation Brands announced a partnership to create a content studio and produce shows that revolve around Constellation's brands. It built on a partnership formed between Tastemade and Constellation in recent years when the two collaborated on videos for social media to attract Generation Z and Millennial consumers of drinking age.

Later that year, Amazon Live launched exclusive shoppable content from Tastemade, including episodes of Struggle Meals.

In 2024, Tastemade and Amazon MGM Studios signed a multi-year first look deal to produce unscripted lifestyle content. Their first venture together as part of the deal will deliver 15 new shows to Prime Video and Amazon Freevee audiences over the next few years. "Dish it Out" will be the first unscripted series to come from the partnership. Hosted by Gordon Ramsay's daughter, Matilda "Tilly" Ramsay, the series will follow the young Ramsay as she receives a mystery box of goods from various chefs and home cooks around the world in each episode, piecing together the items in each box to create a globally inspired dish.

Later that year, Tastemade partnered with Pinterest to launch their first streaming show, Deliciously Entertaining—aimed at whetting the appetite of users to engage with the image-sharing social platform.

Also in 2024, Tastemade partnered with Shopsense AI to enable US viewers to shop items of select Tastemade lifestyle streaming content, starting with the series Kitchen Glow Up. Later that year, Tastemade acquired six lifestyle series, starring celebrity chef Jamie Oliver, for the U.S. through a partnership with Fremantle. The company also acquired the streaming rights to Alison Roman's Home Movies digital series.

Tastemade's other original programming includes the shows Thirsty For..., Alice in Paris, 8-Bit Cooking School, All the Pizza, One for the Road, Food Court, and Grand Opening—Bondi Harvest.

=== Selected list of programs ===
- Alice in Paris
- All Nighter
- All the Pizza
- All Up In My Grill
- Baking it Easy
- Broken Bread
- Curtis Stone's Field Trip
- Day of Gluttony
- Frankie's World
- Frankie vs. The Internet
- Grill Iron
- Kitchen Glow Up
- Local Flight
- Luke Nguyen's Street Food Asia
- Mad Good Food
- Make This Tonight
- Mary's Kitchen Crush
- Off Menu
- One for the Road
- Raw. Vegan. Not Gross
- Street Somm
- Struggle Meals
- The Curious Chef
- The Un-Adventurers
- Thirsty For...
- Tiny Kitchen
- Uncharted
- Weekend Refresh
- Worth the Hype

== Social ==
Its show Tiny Kitchen, which focuses on dishes being made in a miniature kitchen, has been featured on ABC News.

In August 2017, Tastemade launched Struggle Meals starring Chef Frankie Celenza on Facebook Watch. In 2018, the series launched on Snapchat Discover.

In 2022, Tastmade and Pinterest announced a global partnership. The partnership includes new shows on Pinterest, hundreds of hours of live programming for Pinterest TV, video content across core and emerging verticals, and in-person creator events at Tastemade studios globally.
