= Kristos Andrews =

British actor (born 1990)

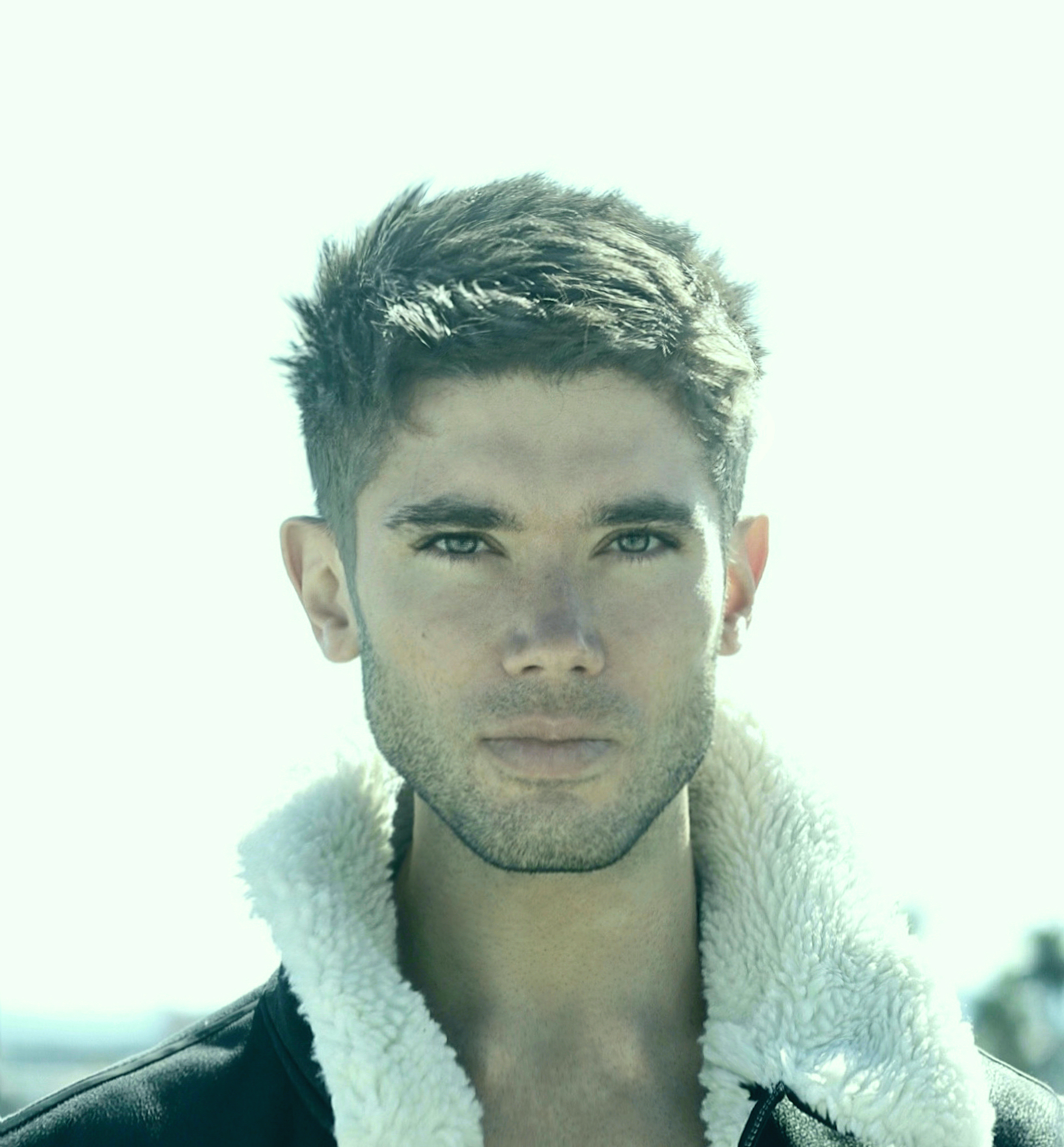

Kristos Andrews is a British-American actor who is an 11-time Daytime Emmy winner. He has received a record 10 Emmy wins by the age of 30. Andrews received Emmy Awards in 2016, 2017, 2018, 2020 and 2021 for his work as the lead actor on critically acclaimed crime-drama The Bay on Peacock. Andrews has won five more Emmys as an executive producer of the series in 2015, 2016, 2017, 2018 and 2020, in addition to winning an Emmy for his work as a director.

Since 2016, he has starred as Tyler in the Pop TV teen sitcom This Just In, for which he received an Emmy nomination for his comedic work.

== Early life ==
Christos Augustin Andrew-Drum was born in Los Angeles, California on August 25, 1990 to Catherine Andrews and Gary Drum. During his childhood, he and his cousins spent summers at his family's recording studio farm, Ridge Farm Studios, where famous British rock bands frequently recorded, and Freddy Mercury & Queen first started rehearsing the song "Bohemian Rhapsody" in mid-1975. Later, he attended Harvard Business School Online for a short term Program. He also has two sisters, Celeste Drum and Angelica Drum.

== Career ==
Andrews began portraying Pete Garrett on crime-drama The Bay when it debuted in September 2010. He was nominated for a Daytime Emmy Award for Outstanding Special Class Short Format Daytime as an executive producer of The Bay in 2012. In 2015, he won the Daytime Emmy for Outstanding New Approaches Drama Series for the series. He won again in the renamed category Outstanding Digital Daytime Drama Series in 2016, 2017, and 2018. Andrews also won the Daytime Emmy for Outstanding Actor in a Digital Daytime Drama Series for his role on The Bay in 2016, in the renamed category Outstanding Lead Actor in a Digital Daytime Drama Series in 2017, and again in 2018.

Since 2016, Andrews has starred as Tyler in the teen sitcom This Just In, for which he was also nominated for a 2017 Daytime Emmy for Outstanding Children's or Family Viewing Series as a producer.

In 2012, Andrews was the youngest producer ever nominated for an Emmy, and in 2017, he became the first person to ever win five Emmys by the age of 26.

Andrews played the lead role in the indie feature films The Southside, a biographical film based on the true story and tragic death of Robert Areizaga Jr. He received an Indie Series Award nomination for Best Lead Actor – Drama for the role.

Andrews' acting portfolio includes the reoccurring role of Ronnie Riley on Nickelodeon's Super Sportlets and as a lead band member of Miranda Cosgrove's TV Band (iCarly). Andrews also appeared in the Craigslist Joe documentary and the foreign film, Triangle. With appearances in several national commercials including Wendy's and Best Buy.

== Filmography ==
=== Actor ===
- Sportlets (2007) as Ronnie Riley
- iCarly (2008) as Band Member
- The Industry (2009) as Chris
- Super Sportlets (2010) as Ronnie Riley
- ACME Hollywood Dream Role (2011) as Buddy
- Triangle (2012) as Switch
- A Place Called Hollywood (2015) as Charlie Law
- The Southside (2015) as Robert Ariezaga Jr.
- This Just In (2016-2017) as Tyler
- A Second Chance (2017) as Brian
- Class Act (2019) as Mike Mason
- The Last Whistle (2018) as Tom
- FraXtur (2018) as Raleigh Vega
- The Bay (2010–2017) as Pete Garrett

=== Producer ===
- Jack Rio (2008)
- Lights Out (2010)
- A Place Called Hollywood (2015)
- The Intruders (2017)
- This Just In (18 episodes, 2016–2017)
- The Bay (94 episodes, 2010–2017)

=== Director ===
- The Bay (11 episodes, 2014)

== Awards and nominations ==
Year	Award	Program	Category	Result	Ref.
2011	2nd Indie Soap Awards	The Bay	Outstanding Ensemble	Nominated	
2012	39th Daytime Creative Arts Emmy Awards	The Bay	Outstanding Special Class Short Format Daytime	Nominated	
2012	3rd Indie Soap Awards	The Bay	Best Ensemble–Drama	Nominated	
2012	3rd Indie Soap Awards	The Bay	Best Breakout Performance	Nominated	
2014	5th Indie Series Awards	The Bay	Best Ensemble – Drama	Nominated	
2015	42nd Daytime Creative Arts Emmy Awards	The Bay	Outstanding New Approaches Drama Series	Won	
2016	43rd Daytime Creative Arts Emmy Awards	The Bay	Outstanding Digital Daytime Drama Series	Won	
2016	43rd Daytime Creative Arts Emmy Awards	The Bay	Outstanding Actor in a Digital Daytime Drama Series	Won	
2016	7th Indie Series Awards	The Bay	Best Web Series – Drama	Nominated	
2016	7th Indie Series Awards	The Bay	Best Ensemble – Drama	Nominated	
2017	44th Daytime Creative Arts Emmy Awards	The Bay	Outstanding Digital Daytime Drama Series	Won	
2017	44th Daytime Creative Arts Emmy Awards	The Bay	Outstanding Lead Actor in a Digital Daytime Drama Series	Won	
2017	44th Daytime Creative Arts Emmy Awards	This Just In	Outstanding Children's or Family Viewing Series	Nominated	
2017	8th Indie Series Awards	The Bay	Best Web Series – Drama	Won	
2017	8th Indie Series Awards	The Bay	Best Ensemble – Drama	Won	
2017	8th Indie Series Awards	The Bay	Best Lead Actor – Drama	Nominated	
2018	45th Daytime Creative Arts Emmy Awards	The Bay	Outstanding Digital Daytime Drama Series	Won	
2018	45th Daytime Creative Arts Emmy Awards	The Bay	Outstanding Lead Actor in a Digital Daytime Drama Series	Won	
2018	NVIFF Awards	A Place Called Hollywood	Best American Actor	Won	
2020	47th Daytime Emmy Awards	The Bay	Outstanding Digital Daytime Drama Series	Won	
2020	47th Daytime Emmy Awards	The Bay	Outstanding Lead Actor in a Digital Daytime Drama Series	Won	
