= Gregori J. Martin =

American actor (born 1978)

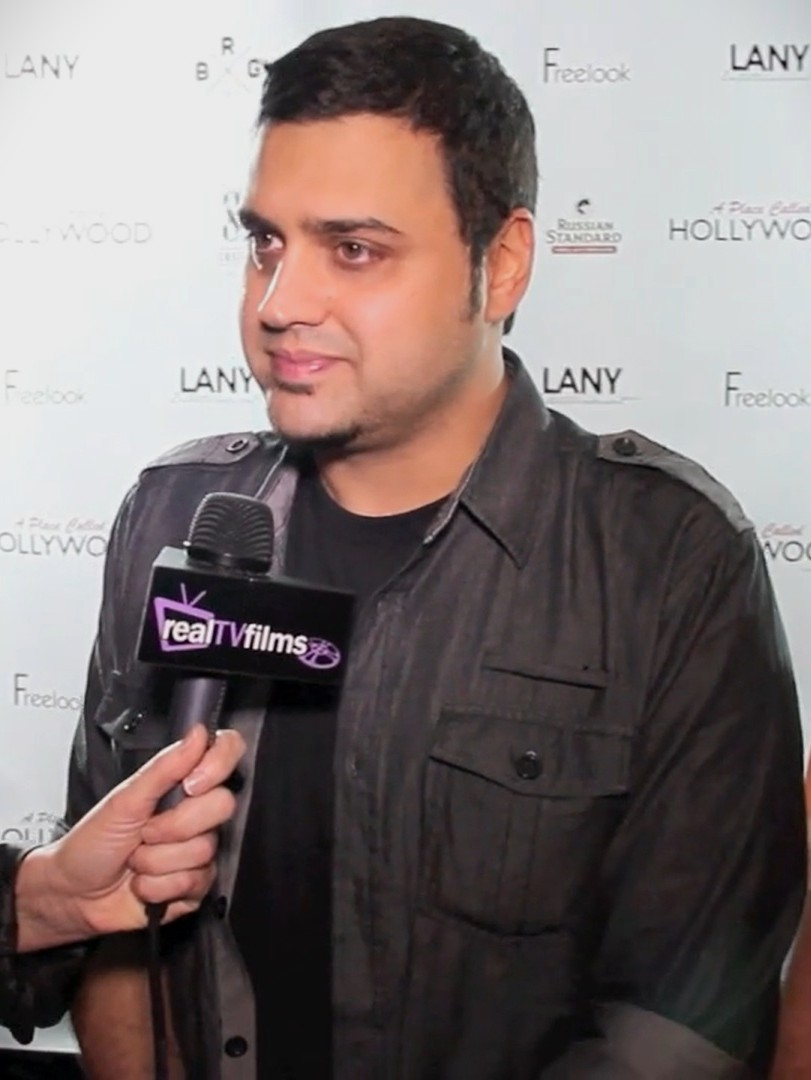
- Martin in 2013
- Born: Gregorio Barbieri Jr. May 6, 1978 (age 48); Yonkers, New York, U.S.
- Occupations: Executive Producer, CEO
- Children: 2

Gregori J. Martin (born Gregorio Barbieri Jr.; May 6, 1978) is a television producer, director, and the founder, CEO, and chairman of LANY Entertainment (formerly known as LANYfilms Productions) an independent bi-coastal entertainment company. Martin is best known for his digital drama series The Bay, for which he won the 2015 Daytime Emmy Award for Outstanding New Approaches Drama Series and the 2016, 2017, and 2018 Daytime Emmy Awards for Outstanding Digital Daytime Drama Series. Martin is also known for the theatrically released independent vampire thriller Raven, a feature film produced by GruntWorks Entertainment where he originally served as a producer, director and as president for approximately four years. Martin is currently in development on a six-hour miniseries titled The Disciples that was sold to Sony Entertainment and serves as co-executive producer and head writer of the made-for-TV miniseries. Martin also serves as co-executive producer and director of the Daytime Emmy-nominated situation comedy This Just In for Associated Television International (ATI). Martin was awarded the 2011 Indie Series Award for Outstanding Directing for his work on The Bay and was again nominated in 2016, 2017, and 2018.

== Career ==
Around 2000, Martin wrote and produced several experimental projects and TV pilots including Waterfront, directed by Richard J. Lewis. In the Spring of 2005 he made his directorial debut for the stage with Crucify!, a self-written original play following the crucifixion and resurrection of Jesus of Nazareth. It was at that time he turned to directing films.

In 2006, Martin directed, wrote and produced two feature motion pictures, His first film MARy, an indie horror film based on the urban legend Bloody Mary, shot on location in Los Angeles County. Relocating to the East Coast, he began production as a producer, director, and co-writer of Manhattanites, a feature dramedy starring several Emmy-nominated stars from the ABC and CBS daytime soap operas.

In 2007, Martin moved back to Los Angeles, where he wrote, produced, and directed a project called Skeletons in the Desert, It was this project that brought Martin to collaborate with GruntWorks Entertainment where he helped manage and control all aspects of production for four years. With GruntWorks, Martin directed and co-produced the film Jack Rio, screened at the Terror Film Festival in Philadelphia, Pennsylvania. Additional Gruntworks collaborations include The Intruders and Sebastian.

Martin completed his tenth feature film, The Southside, based on the true story and tragic death of his cousin, Robert Areizaga Jr. Currently in post-production, Martin's eleventh feature film, A Place Called Hollywood, is a satire that tells the story of a young man pursuing an acting career in Hollywood. In 2013, Martin served as a story consultant and behind the scenes producer for the TV Guide Network (TVGN) documentary Who Shot the Daytime Soap?

Martin has also appeared as an actor, performing in various television and film roles including an appearance as a police officer on ABC's General Hospital, as a terrorist on PAX-TV in The Heroes of Flight 93, in the supporting role of "Jack" in the indie feature motion picture comedy Amber Sunrise, and multiple supporting and cameo roles in his films. Lights Out, a screenplay of Martin's, is in production by the independent film company Mystery Inc. Entertainment.

Martin is currently serving as a Co-Executive Producer on the 2025 feature animation "Saurus City" starring Emma Roberts, Ron Pearlman, Dennis Quaid, Tim Meadows and more, some of Martin's additional credits include, the director, writer and producer of the upcoming film noir feature motion picture The Raven, a re-imagining of Edgar Allan Poe's The Raven and Annabel Lee, starring Tony Todd in one of his final performances, and as part of the producing team on the upcoming psychological war drama "The Plastic Men" a feature motion picture, inspired by true events of a Vietnam war veteran who struggles through PTSD and experiences a chance encounter with a tragic love. Narrated by actor William Fichtner. In addition to these films, Martin is also a producer on an independent action film on Tubi, Breakout starring an ensemble cast. As an Associate Head-Writer, he recently helped launch the CBS Daytime Drama, in association with Procter & Gamble and the NAACP, "Beyond The Gates" premiering February 24, 2025 on CBS and Paramount+.

In 2023 and 2024 Gregori J. Martin's The Bay made Daytime Emmy history becoming the first independent series ever to be nominated for Outstanding Daytime Drama Series. Martin has written, produced, and directed over 100 episodes of the series and is currently in development on their tenth season.

=== Digital Drama Series ===
Martin is the creator, writer, director and executive producer of the digital drama series The Bay, which premiered in September 2010. Recognized by the National Academy of Television Arts and Sciences (NATAS), Martin has since won a 2016 Daytime Emmy Award for Outstanding Digital Daytime Drama Series for The Bay, a 2015 Daytime Emmy Award for Outstanding New Approaches Drama Series, and the 2016, 2017, and 2018 Daytime Emmy Awards for Outstanding Digital Daytime Drama Series for the series. In 2018, Martin won the Daytime Emmy Award for Outstanding Directing in a Digital Drama Series for his work on The Bay, Martin was previously nominated in 2012 for Outstanding Special Class Short Format Daytime for The Bay.

The Bay was featured in the September 20–26, 2010 issue of TV Guide as Top Shows Worth Watching in 2010–2011. In December 2010, Martin was named by We Love Soaps as one of the 15 Most Fascinating People of 2010 for the creation of the series.

== Personal life ==
Martin resides in Hollywood, California. He is a native New Yorker and father of two children, Dante Aleksander (born 2001) and Isabella Rain (born 2008).

== Filmography ==
=== Producer / Director / Screenwriter ===
- Manhattanites (2008)
- Jack Rio (2008)
- MARy (2008)
- Skeletons in the Desert (2008)
- The Intruders (2009)
- Raven (2009)
- Lights Out (2010)
- Sebastian (2011)
- The Southside (2015)
- Place Called Hollywood (2015)
- The Last Whistle (2018)
- FraXtur (2018)
- Class Act (2019)
- The Bay (120 episodes, 2010–2025) (TV)
- The Raven (feature film) (2025)

=== Film actor ===
- Better Living (1998) as Teen Neighbor
- The Hole (2000) as Green
- Big Apple (2002) as Gigilo G
- The Guru (2002) as Devout Follower
- Amber Sunrise (2006) as Jack
- Spiritual Warriors (2007) as Resident of Atlantis
- Manhattanites (2008) as Charlie Dean
- Jack Rio (2008) as Dante Abrams
- MARy (2008) as Priest
- Skeletons in the Desert (2008) as David Grey
- The Intruders (2009) as Bartender
- Raven (2009) as Dr. Ahn
- Lights Out (2010) as Soap Actor
- Sebastian (2011) as Officer Castillo
- The Southside (2015) as Detective Velez

=== Television actor ===
- Get a Life (1 episode, 1997)
- The $treet (1 episode, 2000) as Carlos
- Law & Order (1 episode, 2001) as Det. Vic Perez
- Oz (1 episode, 2002) as Inmate
- Grey's Anatomy (1 episode, 2005) as Orderly
- The Heroes of Flight 93 (2006) as Ahmed Al Nami
- General Hospital (6 episodes, 2005–2006) as Police Officer
- The Bay (2 episodes, 2012–2014) (TV) as P.I. Clark
