= Frankie Celenza =

Chef and television personality

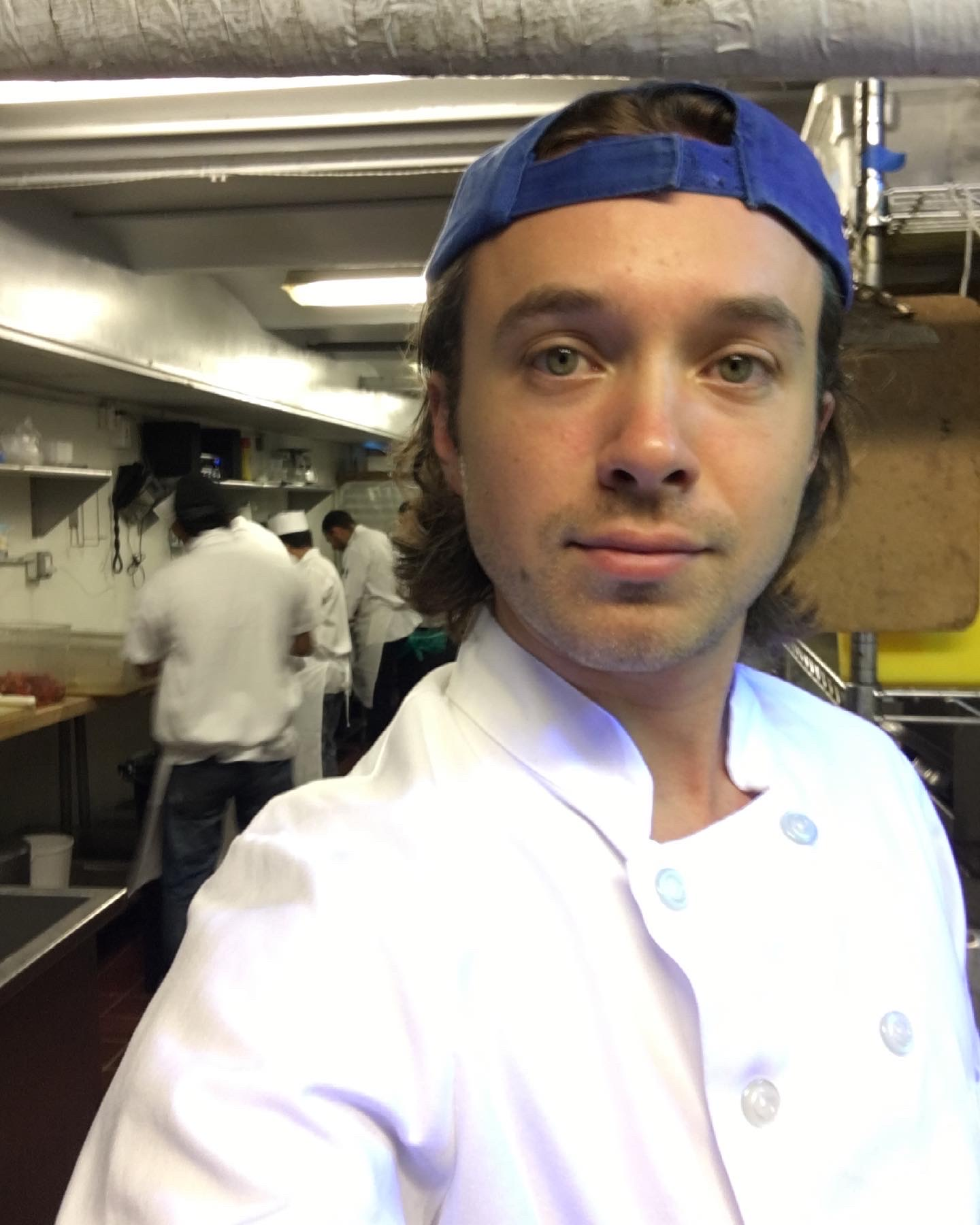
- Frankie Celenza in June 2016
- Born: New York City
- Education: New York University Tisch School of the Arts
- Culinary career
- Television show(s): Frankie Cooks NYC Media Frankie's World Tastemade Struggle Meals Tastemade Frankie vs the Internet Tastemade Worth the Hype Tastemade

Frankie Celenza is a chef and television personality.

== Early life and education ==
Celenza was born in New York. He graduated from Kent School in 2005 and New York University Tisch School of the Arts in 2009.

== Career ==
Celenza is the producer and host of the show Frankie Cooks on NYC Life. He has created many videos on YouTube and Tastemade. Celenza's programs have received New York Emmy Awards in 2013, 2014, and in 2022 Celenza won the Daytime Emmy Award for Outstanding Lifestyle/Culinary Show Host for Struggle Meals.

His show Struggle Meals is a cooking show for those on a budget and is produced with Tastemade, inspired by his college experience to prepare healthy food for himself and other students that cost less than the meal plan that NYU offered.

Joining Michelle Obama at a June 2016 harvesting event at the White House vegetable garden, Celenza, 29 years old at the time, called himself the "food ambassador for my generation".

In 2021, he hosted the first season of Frankie vs the Internet, another Tastemade production, in which chefs compete to create meals inspired by online culinary trends.

In 2024, Celenza shot two seasons of a new food and travel show, Worth the Hype, with Tastemade.

In July 2025, Celenza published his first cookbook, titled EAT! Easy, Affordable, Tasty, via Union Square & Co.
