= 5th Indie Series Awards =

- Date: April 2, 2014
- Hosted by: Carolyn Hennesy
- Produced by: Roger Newcomb, Kevin Mulcahy Jr., Susan Bernhardt

Highlights
- Most awards: Professional Friend and Progress

Television coverage
- Network: JTS

The 5th Annual Indie Series Awards ceremony was held on Wednesday, April 2nd at the historic El Portal Theatre in North Hollywood, hosted by Carolyn Hennesy. Hustling was named Best Web Series - Drama. Professional Friend took home the award for Best Web Series - Comedy.

5th Annual Indie Series Awards Winners List

== Awards ==
Winners will be listed first and highlighted in boldface:

**Best Web Series (Drama)**: **Hustling**; DeVanity; Out With Dad; Progress; Still; Thurston	**Best Web Series (Comedy)**: **Professional Friend**; Husbands; Noirhouse; Pete Winning and the Pirates; Twenty Five; Wrecked
**Best Directing (Drama)**: **Jonathan Robbins, Clutch**; Kit Williamson, EastSiders; Jason Leaver, Out With Dad; Tina Cesa Ward, Producing Juliet; Jonathan Holbrook, Still; Paul Awad, Thurston	**Best Directing (Comedy)**: **Mike Fly and Simon Fraser, Versus Valerie**; Henryk Cymerman and Tim Russ, Bloomers; Steve Silverman, Dating in the Middle Ages; Eli Gonda, Husbands; Shaun Wilson, Noirhouse; Nate Golon, My Synthesized Life
**Best Lead Actor (Drama)**: **Peter Halpin, 3some**; J. Julian Christopher, Bulk; Richard Cutting, Milgram and the Fastwalkers; Van Hansis, EastSiders; Jason Kuykendall, Dark Pool; Sebastian La Cause, Hustling	**Best Lead Actor (Comedy)**: **Brad Bell, Husbands**; Brent Bailey, My Synthesized Life; Jonathan Biver, Professional Friend; Brennan Caldwell, Twenty Five; Mike Donis, Pete Winning and the Pirates; Ron Hanks, Golden California
**Best Lead Actress (Drama)**: **Kate Conway, Out With Dad** (2nd Award); Sierra Hersek, Dark Pool; Alicia Minshew, Tainted Dreams; Lisa Roumain, Split; Daphne Rubin-Vega, Hustling; Colleen Zenk, Thurston	**Best Lead Actress (Comedy)**: **Bhama Roget, Wrecked**; Lisa Valentine Clark, Pretty Darn Funny; Jourdan Gibson, Super Knocked Up; Tracy Ryerson, Kiss Her I'm Famous; Hannah Spear, Versus Valerie; Alex Trow, Twenty Five
**Best Supporting Actor (Drama)**: **Gerald McCullouch, Hustling**; Andrew Glaszek, Hustling; Rob Healy, Broken at Love; Kyle Lowder, DeVanity; Matthew McKelligon, EastSiders; Robert Nolan, Out With Dad	**Best Supporting Actor (Comedy)**: **Christian Blackburn, Professional Friend**; Robert Bergin, Wrecked; John Cramer, He's With Me; Cameron Cronin, DECo; Gibson Frazier, Wallflowers; Al Thompson, Entangled with You
**Best Supporting Actress (Drama)**: **Jillian Clare, Clutch**; Rachael Hip-Flores, Producing Juliet; Caitlynne Medrek, Out With Dad; Lindsey Middleton, Out With Dad; Sharon Washington, Hustling; Constance Wu, EastSiders	**Best Supporting Actress (Comedy)**: **Jessica Martin, Wrecked**; Jessica DiGiovanni, Twenty Five; Katie Gill, My Synthesized Life; Deidre Hall, Dating in the Middle Ages; Swati Kapila, Bloomers; Darcie Siciliano, He's With Me
**Best Ensemble (Drama)**: **EastSiders**; 3some; The Bay; The Dreamers; Producing Juliet; Tainted Dreams	**Best Ensemble (Comedy)**: **Fumbling thru the Pieces**; Adopted; Bloomers; Nights at the Round Table; Noirhouse; Wallflowers
**Best Guest Star (Drama)**: **Charlene Tilton, DeVanity**; Sharon Farrell, Broken at Love; Stephen Guarino, Hustling; Traci Lords, EastSiders; Gordon Thomson, DeVanity; Walt Willey, Thurston	**Best Guest Star (Comedy)**: **Amy Acker, Husbands**; Darin Brooks, Bloomers; Carolyn Hennesy, Single Siblings; Christian LeBlanc, Fumbling thru the Pieces; Katie Leclerc, My Synthesized Life; Natalie Morales, The Ladies & The Gents
**Best Writing (Drama)**: **Lisa Gifford, 3some**; Michael Caruso, DeVanity; Kelsey Jorissen, The Dreamers; Sebastian La Cause, Hustling; Armando Saldanamora, Progress; Kathryn O'Sullivan, Thurston	**Best Writing (Comedy)**: **Rob Raffety, Andrew Heaton and Satya Thallam, Cap South**; Julie A. Smith and Donna Hurst, Fumbling thru the Pieces; Brad Bell and Jane Espenson, Husbands; Jeff Parkin, Jared Cardon, Lisa Valentine Clark, Adrienne Cardon, Kacy Faulconer and Tom Quinn, Pretty Darn Funny; Eric Bilitch, Professional Friend; Liz Ellis, Courtney Meaker, Gabriel A. Carbajal and Lizzie Sivitz, Wrecked
**Best Production Design (All Shows)**: **David King, Progress**; Lynn Malmberg, Dark Pool; Nicole Vardi, Destroy the Alpha Gammas; Michael Caruso and Barbara Caruso, DeVanity; Mike Fly, Simon Fraser and Stephanie Kaliner, Versus Valerie; Natasha Diak, Gay Nerds	**Best Cinematography (All shows)**: **Boa Simon, Progress**; Peter Hermes, The Inn; David M. Gil, mI promise; Derek Kimball and David C. Miller, Ragged Isle; Jonathan Holbrook, STILL; Daniel Gilbert, Wrecked
**Best Editing (All Shows)**: **Phil Bucci, Destroy the Alpha Gammas**; Nate Atcheson, Husbands; Paul Lada, Progress; Barry Dodd, Ragged Isle; Jonathan Holbrook, STILL; Nathaniel Buechler and Liz Ellis, Wrecked	**Best Visual/Special Effects (All Shows)**: **Philip Cook, Malice**; Doug Drexler, Adventures of Superseven; Jeff Sinasac, Clutch; Animation by Natalie Garceau, VFX by Jason Leaver and Dan Turner, Out With Dad; Daniel DeFabio and Christopher Vincelette, Super Knocked Up; Davin Lengyel, Nick Montgomery and Xerxes Cortez, Versus Valerie
**Best Soundtrack (All Shows)**: **Scott Thomas, Professional Friend**; Kalup Linzy, As Da Art World Might Turn; Fernanda Espíndola, Wiley B. Oscar, Matt Palazzolo and Alex Paris, Bloomers; SIRPAUL, Hustling; Carly Rhiannon, LESlieVILLE; Adrian Ellis, Rebecca Rynsoever and Jason Leaver, Out With Dad	**Best Original Score (All shows)**: **Aaron Tsang, Pete Winning and the Pirates**; Brian "Tweex" Arnold, Abigail; Michael H. Daniel, Bennington Gothique; Adrian Ellis, Clutch; TJ Kross, Justice Woman; Keith Stacey, Progress
**Best Costume Design (All Shows)**: **Kathryn O'Sullivan, Thurston**; Mary Jo Anderson, Dating in the Middle Ages; Liz Goulding, Noirhouse; Lis de Tuerk Ghadar and Otessa Marie Ghadar, Orange Juice in Bishop's Garden; Samantha Aylsworth, Pete Winning and the Pirates; Shannon Arrant, Progress	**Best Makeup (All Shows)**: **Angelle Clarke, Bloomers**; Eric Kirker, Renonda Bray, Dre Lamparello and Anna Habrat, The Bay; Kylie Pressley, DeVanity; Liz Goulding, Noirhouse; Michelle Laino, Proper Manors; Tara Brawley, Monik Walmsley, Joe Primeau and Lucie Cheng, Versus Valerie
