= List of Out with Dad cast members =

This is the cast of Out with Dad

Actor/Actress	Role	details	episodes
Main Roles
Kate Conway	Rose Miller	19-year-old teen living in Toronto.	All Season 1 (1.05 on the phone); All Season 2 but 2.04; Season 3 except 7-13-15-19-21; Season 4 exc. 8-10-12-13 All Season 5
Will Conlon (season 1 & 2); Jonathan Robbins (season 3 &4)	Nathan Miller a.k.a. Dad	Freelance graphic designer, widower of Sarah.	Season 1 (not 1.04, 1.08 = voice); All Season 2 but 2.04; Season 3 except 5-7-13-15-19-21; Season 4 ep. 1-3-5-9 All Season 5 but ep 4
Lindsey Middleton	Vanessa LeMay	Rose Miller's female best friend and (im)possible lover	Season 1 ep. 1-2-3-4-7; Season 2 ep. (1)-2-3-4-5-6-(9)-11-12; Season 3 ep. 1-5-6-7-9-12-13-15-19-21-22; Season 4 ep. 5-8-10-12-13 All Season 5
Corey Lof	Kenny	Rose Miller's male best friend and confidant. Ex-boyfriend of Alica Van Harren.	Season 1 ep. 2-3-4-7-8; Season 2 ep. (1)-2-5-(9)-10-11; Season 3 ep. 1-5-6-10-14-16-20-22 in no ep in Season 4 and 5
Caitlynne Medrek	Claire Daniels a.k.a. the Girl in the Washroom	Rose Miller's new female friend and ex-girlfriend. She works with Emilio at Scarborough Museum.	Season 2 ep. 3-7-8-(9)-10-11-12; Season 3 exc. 7-9-13-15-17-21; Season 4 ep. 6-11 In no ep season 5
Laura Jabalee	Alicia Van Harren	Kenny's ex-girlfriend.	Season 2 ep. 2-5-6-11; Season 3 ep. 6-16-17-18-22; Season 4 ep. 2-6-11-14 In no ep season 5
Persons close to Nathan & Rose
Kelly-Marie Murtha	Angela	Nathan Miller's former date & Johnny's friend, realtor, mother of Carly, 17 yo daughter and Sean, 10 yo son. Her ex-husband Roger came out as gay and remarried to his boyfriend Aidan. She mentions her homophobic mother.	Season 1 ep. 5 Season 2 ep. (1)-5-10; Season 3 ep. 1-2-10-11-12-20-22
Darryl Dinn	Johnny	Nathan Miller's male and gay friend. He matches Nathan with Angela, gives him advice about Rose's homosexuality and joins them at PFLAG Canada meetings.	Season 1 ep. 2 Season 2 ep. 6-7-8; Season 3 ep. 6-20-22
Ashton Catherwood	Dave	Architect and Nathan's work partner. Character from "Microwave Porn" (hint about his "room mate").	Season 2 ep. 6-11
Helen Conway	Sarah (on wedding photo)	Nathan Miller's late wife. She died the day Rose was born.	Season 2 ep. 1
Keisha Prince	Valery	Nathan Miller's former girlfriend.	Season 4 ep. 9
Russell Winkelaar	Owen Brett	Rose's friend who is in a wheelchair.	Season 4 ep. 4-9-14
Vanessa Salazar	Nessa	Rose Miller's former date.	Season 4 ep. 7-9-14
Janelle Hanna	Carly	Angela's daughter.	Season 3 ep. 22
Rob Mills	Jim Miller	Nathan's father. He supports his granddaughter's homosexuality.	Season 3 ep. 22
Sarah Wilson	Maddie Miller	Nathan's mother. She supports her granddaughter's homosexuality, although she lacks her husband's careful choice of words.	Season 3 ep. 22
Vanessa's family and Ryan
Wendy Glazier	Theresa LeMay	Vanessa's mother. She is a strict Catholic woman. She forbade Rose and Vanessa to see each other when she discovers Rose's homosexuality (2.03).	Season 1 ep. 7 Season 2 ep. 3-4-5-12; Season 3 ep. 5-7-8-9
Robert Nolan	Steven LeMay	Vanessa's father. He used to follow Theresa's doing. They are now divorced.	Season 2 ep. 4-5; Season 3 ep. 1-5-7-8-9-21
Jacob Ahearn	Jacob LeMay	Vanessa's younger brother.	Season 2 ep. 4-5
Neil Silcox	Mathew LeMay	Vanessa's older brother, has left LeMay house over his mom's opposition to his marriage to Fatima, who is a Muslim. He has a son with her named "Ollie".	Evoked in Season 2 Ep. 3-4; Season 3 ep. 13-15-19(V)-21
Afshan Golriz	Fatima LeMay	Vanessa's sister-in-law, Matthew's wife. She has a son with him named "Ollie".	Evoked in Season 2 Ep. 4 Season 3 ep. 13-15-21
Matt Landry	Ryan Brown	Vanessa's matched ex-boyfriend.	Season 2 ep. 11
Claire's family
Jennifer Kenneally	Marion Daniels	She is Claire's mother, attending PFLAG meetings with her. She still has to cope with her daughter's homosexuality but she is trying.	Season 2 ep. 7. Feat. 2.08; Season 3 ep. 2-3-17-18-22
Andrew Kines	Ted Daniels	He is Claire's father, mostly absent towards his family because of working a lot.	Season 3 ep. 2-3-(10:evoked)
Daniel Solokhine	Brian Daniels	He is Claire's brother, always speaking his mind.	Season 3 ep. 2-3
"Vanessa's Story" characters
Katherine Fogler	Kayla	Begging in the street, she brings Vanessa to "Kyle's place", seduces her, and then steals her cell phone.	Season 3 ep. 7-9-12
John Cianciolo	Kyle	Drug dealer allowing LGBT people in his place if they perform services, he tries to drug and rape Vanessa.	Season 3 ep. 9(voice)-12-13
Grace Glowicki	Erica	Lesbian girl cohabiting in "Kyle's place".	Season 3 ep. 7-9(voice)
Eitan Shalmon	Marco	Gay guy cohabiting in "Kyle's place", makes fun of bisexuality and brands this as a transition phase to being gay.	Season 3 ep. 7
Louisa Zhu	Tracey	Bisexual girl cohabiting in "Kyle's place", tells Vanessa her story in which Vanessa can mirror her mistakes towards Rose.	Season 3 ep. 7-9
Trevor Ramai Jr	Policeman	Asks questions to Steven LeMay to start the inquiry about Vanessa's elopement.	Season 3 ep. 9
School teachers and staff
Jonathan Nathaniel	Mr. Gladstone, The School Vice Principal	Rose tells her about Brittany's bullying. He is a closeted gay man.	Season 3 ep. 20
Gene Abella	Advanced English Teacher	Romeo & Juliet lesson	Season 2 ep. 3-6-11
only evoked	Mrs Monish, religion teacher	She has made fun of Claire in class because she's gay and confirms Brittany's refusal to sell them a couple's ticket.	Season 3 ep. 5-14
Jeff Sinasac	Mr Kelsey, gym teacher	He talks to Nathan about finding Rose a new place to change before gym class	Season 3 ep. 16
School other teens and family
Chandler Loryn (Chandler Boriska)	Britney a.k.a. "Brittany Robinson",	"So unfair" reply (S2E11), she calls Rose a liar when she is outed, refuses to sell a couple's ticket to Claire for the school fall-formal and kicks Rose out of the girls' change room because she is lesbian.	Season 2 ep. 11; Season 3 ep. 5-14-16
Dan Beausoleil	Ethan (Classmate) a.k.a. Party Guitarist	"Fag" & "Family fudes" replies.	Season 1 ep. 4 Season 2 ep. 3-6. Feat. 2.11
Adrian Rebucas	Emilio a.k.a. Romeo a.k.a. Classmate	"Fag" reply. Reads Romeo part in class. He works with Claire at Scarborough Museum.	Season 2 ep. 3-6-10. Feat. 2.11
Carolyn Nettleton	Party friend a.k.a. "Alicia's Pack of Friends" 1	Blonde and short. (FB)	Season 1 ep. 4 --- Season 2 ep. 2 Season 3 ep. 5-6
Elizabeth (Lizzie) Stuart-Morris	"Alicia's Pack of Friend" 2 aka Party friend a.k.a. Juliet	Brown and tall. Reads Juliet part in class.	Season 1 ep. 4 Season 2 ep. 2-6-11; Season 3 ep. 5-6
Shailene Garnett	"Alicia's Pack of Friends" 3 a.k.a. Classmate	"Chelsey Winter" (2.03) and "race" (2.06) replies.	Season 2 ep. 2-3-11
Kelsey Jenkins	"Alicia's friends" 4	.	Season 2 ep. 11
Sarah Robbins	classmate a.k.a. Girl on Stairs a.k.a. Desiree	"Dance partners" (1.04) & "Chelsey Winter" (2.03) replies.	Season 1 ep. 3-4; Season 2 ep. 3-16
Carol Huska	Mackenzie a.k.a. Classmate	"gay book", "religion" and "not homophobic" replies	Season 2 ep. 3-6-11
Hannah Vanden Boomen	Movie Patrion	She sees Rose and Claire making out in the movie theater (and supposedly spread the news).	Season 3 ep. 4
Anjelica Ong	Sympathetic girl	She congratulates Rose for her couple's ticket and says to forget Brittany's intervention.	Season 3 ep. 5
Brittany Miranda	Sarcastic girl	She makes fun of Rose and Kenny with Sarcastic guy.	Season 3 ep. 5
Michael Esposito II	Sarcastic guy	He makes fun of Rose and Kenny with Sarcastic girl.	Season 3 ep. 5
PFLAG meetings attendants.
Paul Bellini	Gerry	PFLAG meeting leader	Season 2 ep. 7-8
Harpreet Sehmbi	Nowmee	PFLAG meeting attendant. Lesbian who emigrated from South Asia. She comes from a Muslim family.	Season 2 ep. 7. Feat. 2.08
Noor Mohammed	Anwar	PFLAG meeting attendant. Nowmee's brother.	Season 2 ep. 7. Feat. 2.08
Kanza Feris	Athena	PFLAG meeting attendant. Lesbian who emigrated from Cyprus.	Season 2 ep. 7. Feat. 2.08
Aidan Gowland	Morgan	He attends PFLAG meeting for comfort but doesn't share. Featured in 2.08	Season 2 ep. 7. Feat. 2.08
Aubyn Hastings	Other PFLAG meeting attendant.		Season 2 featuring ep. 7-8
Mary Joseph	Maureen	PFLAG meeting attendant. David's mother telling about his ordeal.	Season 2 ep 2.08. Feat. 2.07
Kyle Stewart	David	PFLAG meeting attendant. Sharing the story of his first dance with a boy.	Season 2 ep 2.08. Feat. 2.07
Minor characters
Jason Leaver	Guy on the bench	He approaches Vanessa on a bench and she runs away further to Matthew's apartment. N.B. Jason Leaver is the creator and director of "Out with Dad".	Season 3 ep. 13
Thomas Lever-Fraser	4th friend a.k.a. Party friend	Fourth to play "Euchre"	Season 1 ep. 2-4
Bhim Pandya	Jay	would not play card	Season 1 ep. 2
Laura Stewart	The Barista	Actress also featured in PFLAG meeting.	Season 1 ep. 2 Season 2 featuring ep. 7-8
Chris White	classmate 2		Season 1 ep. 3
Sarah Joy Bennett	the Girl on the Subway	helps Rose to test herself	Season 1 ep. 3 -- Season 3 ep. 6
Party friends played by Will Cai, Wendy Donaldson, Andie Hartshorne-Pople, Claire Wiecien-Sherwood, Sean Sandberg, Coco Siu.			Season 1 ep. 4
Andrew Tribe	Classmate	Class reply	Season 2 ep. 6
Brendon Smith	Homophobic client	Telling a "funny" story about colleague.	Season 2 ep 2.11
Nathan Athay	Ed	Guy from "marketing service" working with the Homophobic client.	Season 2 ep 2.11
Simu Liu	Waiter	Serves Nathan, Rose, Clare and Angela on a patio	Season 3 ep 3.11
