= 3rd Indie Soap Awards =

- Date: February 21, 2012
- Site: New World Stages, New York City

Highlights
- Most nominations: Pretty (13)

In 2012, Colleen Zenk opened the ceremony at New World Stages with a live musical performance, while Fan Yang's Gazillion Bubble Show closed the show.

== Awards ==
Nominations were announced on December 19, 2011, with Pretty receiving a record 13 nominations. Winners are listed first and highlighted in boldface:

**Best Web Series (Drama)**: **Ragged Isle**; Aidan 5; Casual; DeVanity; Out with Dad; Thurston	**Best Web Series (Comedy)**: **Pretty**; Bandwagon; Fumbling Thru The Pieces; Then We Got Help!; Trailer Made; Vampire Mob
**Best Directing (Drama)**: **Barry Dodd, Ragged Isle**; Paul Awad, Thurston; Ben Bays, Aidan 5; Tina Cesa Ward, Anyone But Me; Jay Diaz, Casual; Gregori J. Martin, The Bay	**Best Directing (Comedy)**: **Henryk Cymerman & Tim Russ, Bloomers**; Karri Bowman & Ahmed Best, Bandwagon; Andrew Espinoza Long, Gregory Way TV; J.D. Mata, 40 Is The New 30; Steve Silverman, Pretty; Frederick Snyder, Solo: The Series
**Best Actor (Drama)**: **Sebastian La Cause, Hustling**; Anthony Anderson, Anacostia; Will Conlon, Out with Dad; Rick Dalton,Ragged Isle; Sid Garza-Hillman, Sundays; Brian Thomas Smith, Casual	**Best Actor (Comedy)**: **John Colella, Vampire Mob**; Christian Barber, Six of One; Brad Bell, Husbands; Tom Gregory, Gregory Way TV; Sean Hemeon, Husbands; Sam Pancake, Pretty
**Best Actress (Drama)**: **Kate Conway, Out with Dad**; Crystal Chappell, Venice: The Series; Tamieka Chavis, Anacostia; Jillian Clare, Miss Behave; Catherine Frels, Thurston; Rachael Hip-Flores, Anyone But Me	**Best Actress (Comedy)**: **Emma Caulfield, Bandwagon**; Julie Ann Emery, Then We Got Help!; Fernanda Espindola, Bloomers; Stacy McQueen, Pretty; Hillary B. Smith, Fumbling Thru The Pieces; Tracie Thoms, Bandwagon
**Best Supporting Actor (Drama)**: **Timothy Olin, The RAs**; Chase Coleman, In Between Men; Nicolas Coster, The Bay; Raymond Cruz, Los Americans; Jesse Laing, Pieces; Derrell Whitt, The Bay	**Best Supporting Actor (Comedy)**: **Blake Hammond, Then We Got Help!**; Jim Cashman, Bandwagon; Michael Taylor Gray, Pretty; Jim Holdridge, Bandwagon; Robert Maffia, Fumbling Thru The Pieces; Andrew Espinoza Long, Gregory Way TV
**Best Supporting Actress (Drama)**: **Michael Myracle, California Heaven**; Orlagh Cassidy, Empire; Pasha Diallo, Anacostia; Dot-Marie Jones, Venice: The Series; Lindsey Middleton, Out with Dad; Lupe Ontiveros, Los Americans	**Best Supporting Actress (Comedy)**: **Diane Delano, Fumbling Thru The Pieces**; Karri Bowman, Bandwagon; Genie Francis, Pretty; Dee Freeman, Pretty; Retta, Vampire Mob; Laura Thomas, Trailer Made
**Best Ensemble (Drama)**: **Sundays**; Anacostia; The Bay; DeVanity; Ragged Isle; Venice: The Series	**Best Ensemble (Comedy)**: **Pretty**; Bandwagon; Fumbling Thru The Pieces; Gregory Way TV; Then We Got Help!; Trailer Made
**Best Guest Appearance (Drama)**: **Martha Byrne, Anacostia**; Michelle Clunie, In Between Men; Patrika Darbo, Miss Behave; Jackie Hoffman, The RAs; Anna Holbrook, The Bay ("Far From The Bay"); Ilene Kristen, The Bay ("Far From The Bay")	**Best Guest Appearance (Comedy)**: **Joan Van Ark, Pretty**; Bradford Anderson, The Further Adventures of Cupid and Eros; Anthony Anderson, Pretty; Sam McMurray, Then We Got Help!; Rae Allen, Vampire Mob; Marie Wilson, Workshop
**Best Writing (Drama)**: **Anthony Anderson, Anacostia**; Dylann Bobei, Pieces; Jay Diaz, Casual; Jason Leaver, Out with Dad; Susan Miller & Tina Cesa Ward, Anyone But Me; Greg Tulonen, Rick Dalton, Karen L. Dodd, Barry Dodd & Jacob Lear, Ragged Isle	**Best Writing (Comedy)**: **Jason Vitteri-Lewis, Trailer Made**; Jane Espenson & Brad Bell, Husbands; Tom Gregory & Andrew Espinoza Long, Gregory Way TV; Camilla Rantsen & Karri Bowman, Bandwagon; Steve Silverman, Pretty; Julie A. Smith & Donna Hurst, Fumbling Thru The Pieces
**Best Breakout Performance (All shows)**: **Lynn Wactor, Bandwagon**; Kristos Andrews, The Bay ("Far From The Bay"); Margot Bingham, In Between Men; Tara Chocol-Joyce, Fumbling Thru The Pieces; Wendy Glazier, Out with Dad; Deborah Estelle Philips, The Cavanaughs
**Best Cinematography (All shows)**: **Barry Dodd/Derek Kimball, Ragged Isle**; Matthias Schubert/Gareth Taylor/Andre Lomov, The Bay; Rodolphe Portier, DeVanity; Jendra Jarnagin, In Between Men; Kevin Patrick Wright, Miss Behave	**Best Use of Music (All shows)**: **Miss Behave**; Bandwagon; Out with Dad; Pretty; Ragged Isle; Venice: The Series
**Fan's Choice Award**: **The Bay**; Anacostia; Blood and Bone China; California Heaven; DeVanity; Empire; Fumbling thru the Pieces; In Between Men; Los Americans; Miss Behave; Out with Dad; Pretty; Ragged Isle; Secrets; The Cavanaughs; The Passionate and the Privileged; The RAs; Then We Got Help!; Trailer Made; Venice: The Series	**Best Crossover (All shows)**: **Michael O'Leary,** **The Bay ("Far From The Bay") / Steamboat**; Afton Boggiano, The Bay ("Far From The Bay") / Empire; Mary Beth Evans, Pretty / The Bay
