= 2nd Indie Soap Awards =

Event

- Date: February 21, 2011
- Site: Alvin Ailey Studios, New York City
- Hosted by: Martha Byrne

Highlights
- Best Picture: Diary of a Single Mom
- Best Direction: Gregori J. Martin; The Bay
- Best Actor: Anthony Anderson; Anacostia
- Best Actress: Monica Calhoun; Diary of a Single Mom
- Most awards: Anyone But Me (3)
- Most nominations: Diary of a Single Mom (13)

== Awards ==
Winners are listed first and highlighted in boldface.

| **Indie Soap of the Year**: **Diary of a Single Mom**; 8.13; Anyone But Me; Celeste Bright; Cell; Miss Behave; Pretty; The Best Friend | **Outstanding Directing**: **Gregori J. Martin, The Bay**; Tina Cesa Ward, Anyone But Me; Robert Townsend, Diary of a Single Mom; Mark Gardner, Cell; Scott Brown, Asylum; Jason Leaver, Out with Dad; Steve Silverman, Pretty |
| **Outstanding Lead Actor**: **Anthony Anderson, Anacostia**; Danny Cameron, Cell; Michael Park, Gotham; Nick Mathews, In Between Men; Will Conlon, Out with Dad; Trevor Nelson, Miss Behave; Sam Pancake, Pretty; Camden Toy, The Bay | **Outstanding Lead Actress**: **Monica Calhoun, Diary of a Single Mom**; Tamieka Chavis, Anacostia; Rachael Hip-Flores, Anyone But Me; Tina Sloan, Empire; Martha Byrne, Gotham; Jillian Clare, Miss Behave; Crystal Chappell, Venice: The Series; Jourdan Gibson, Cell; Cwennen Corral, The Cavanaughs |
| **Outstanding Supporting Actor**: **Jordan Clarke, Venice: The Series**; Rob Bogue, All's Faire; Joshua Holland, Anyone But Me; Joel Berti, Desire & Deceit; Billy Dee Williams, Diary of a Single Mom; Toby Levin, Empire; Marco James, Miss Behave; Michael Park, Steamboat | **Outstanding Supporting Actress**: **Nadia Bjorlin, Venice: The Series**; Chante Bowser, Anacostia; Nicole Pacent, Anyone But Me; Valery Ortiz, Diary of a Single Mom; Kathryn Neville Brown, Empire; Kirsten Vangsness, Pretty; Kim Zimmer, Steamboat; Pat Rulon, Trailer Made; Hillary B. Smith, Venice: The Series |
| **Outstanding Guest Appearance**: **Liza Weil, Anyone But Me**; Beth Chamberlin, Cell; Diahann Carroll, Diary of a Single Mom; Irma P. Hall, Diary of a Single Mom; Molly Burnett,Empire; Shirley Jones, Family Dinner; Nicole Miller, Gotham | **Breakthrough Performance**: **Pasha Diallo, Anacostia**; Jessy Hodges, Anyone But Me; Leon, Diary of a Single Mom; Afton Boggiano, Empire; Bianca Magick, Miss Behave; Kate Conway, Out with Dad; Michelle N. Carter, Venice: The Series |
**Outstanding Ensemble**: **Pretty**; Anacostia; Anyone But Me; In Between Men; Orance Juice In Bishop's Garden; Steamboat; The Bay; Venice: The Series
| **Outstanding Writing**: **Susan Miller & Tina Cesa Ward, Anyone But Me**; Anthony Anderson, Anacostia; Sonya Steele, Celeste Bright; Mark Gardner, Cell; Cheryl L. West, Diary of a Single Mom; Greg Turner & Brian Hewson, Empire; Susan Bernhardt, Miss Behave; Jason Leaver, Out with Dad; Steve Silverman, Pretty | **Outstanding Editing**: **Wiley Abbas, In Between Men**; Jonathan M. Levine, Asylum; Loren Melchor & Chris Zeid, Cell; Robert Pergament, Diary of a Single Mom; Frank Mohler, Solo: The Series |
| **Outstanding Use of Music**: **Out with Dad**; Anacostia; Gotham; In Between Men; Miss Behave; Venice: The Series | **Outstanding Sound Design**: **Cell**; 8.13; Diary of a Single Mom; Places Please; The Best Friend; The Steps |
| **Fan's Choice Award** The following are the Top 15 during the Indie Soap of the Week poll: **The Bay**; Anacostia; Anyone But Me; As The Corn Grows; Desire And Deceit; Diary of a Single Mom; Empire; Gotham; Luck And The Virgin; Miss Behave; Montreal Hearts; The Cavanaughs; Venice: The Series; Venus Spa | **Best Storyline**: **Empire: Theodora takes over Empire**; Anacostia: Mia copes with the aftermath of Michael's death; Anyone But Me: Sophie's sexual questioning; Diary of a Single Mom: Bo tries to go back to work; Miss Behave: Tori's blackout; Pretty: Ribina's pregnancy; The Bay: Igor's revenge; Venice: The Series: Gina helps The Colonel after his stroke; **Song of the Year** **"Gumdrop the Unicorn" from Pretty** |
| **Fan's Choice Award** The following are the Top 15 during the Indie Soap of the Week poll: **The Bay**; Anacostia; Anyone But Me; As The Corn Grows; Desire And Deceit; Diary of a Single Mom; Empire; Gotham; Luck And The Virgin; Miss Behave; Montreal Hearts; The Cavanaughs; Venice: The Series; Venus Spa | **Innovative Marketing & Fundraising** **Anyone But Me** |

== Statistics ==
Nominations

| Shows | Nominations | Awards |
| Diary of a Single Mom | 13 | 2 |
| Anyone But Me | 11 | 3 |
| Anacostia | 9 | 2 |
| Venice: The Series | 9 | 2 |
| Miss Behave | 9 | 0 |
| Empire | 8 | 1 |
| Cell | 8 | 1 |
| Pretty | 7 | 2 |
| The Bay | 5 | 2 |
| Out with Dad | 5 | 1 |
| Gotham | 5 | 0 |
| In Between Men | 4 | 1 |
| Steamboat | 3 | 0 |
| 8.13 | 2 | 0 |
| Asylum | 2 | 0 |
| Celeste Bright | 2 | 0 |
| Desire & Deceit | 2 | 0 |
| The Best Friend | 2 | 0 |
| The Cavanaughs | 2 | 0 |
| As The Corn Grows | 1 | 0 |
| Family Dinner | 1 | 0 |
| Luck And The Virgin | 1 | 0 |
| Montreal Hearts | 1 | 0 |
| Orance Juice In Bishop's Garden | 1 | 0 |
| Places Please | 1 | 0 |
| Solo: The Series | 1 | 0 |
| The Like Us Show | 1 | 0 |
| The Steps | 1 | 0 |
| Trailer Made | 1 | 0 |
| Venus Spa | 1 | 0 |

Awards

| Shows | Nominations | Awards |
| Anyone But Me | 11 | 3 |
| Diary of a Single Mom | 13 | 2 |
| Anacostia | 9 | 2 |
| Venice: The Series | 9 | 2 |
| Pretty | 7 | 2 |
| The Bay | 5 | 2 |
| Empire | 8 | 1 |
| Cell | 8 | 1 |
| Out with Dad | 5 | 1 |
| In Between Men | 4 | 1 |
| Miss Behave | 9 | 0 |
| Gotham | 5 | 0 |
| Steamboat | 3 | 0 |
| 8.13 | 2 | 0 |
| Asylum | 2 | 0 |
| Celeste Bright | 2 | 0 |
| Desire & Deceit | 2 | 0 |
| The Best Friend | 2 | 0 |
| The Cavanaughs | 2 | 0 |
| As The Corn Grows | 1 | 0 |
| Family Dinner | 1 | 0 |
| Luck And The Virgin | 1 | 0 |
| Montreal Hearts | 1 | 0 |
| Orance Juice In Bishop's Garden | 1 | 0 |
| Places Please | 1 | 0 |
| Solo: The Series | 1 | 0 |
| The Like Us Show | 1 | 0 |
| The Steps | 1 | 0 |
| Trailer Made | 1 | 0 |
| Venus Spa | 1 | 0 |
