= Brett Eichenberger =

American film director and producer

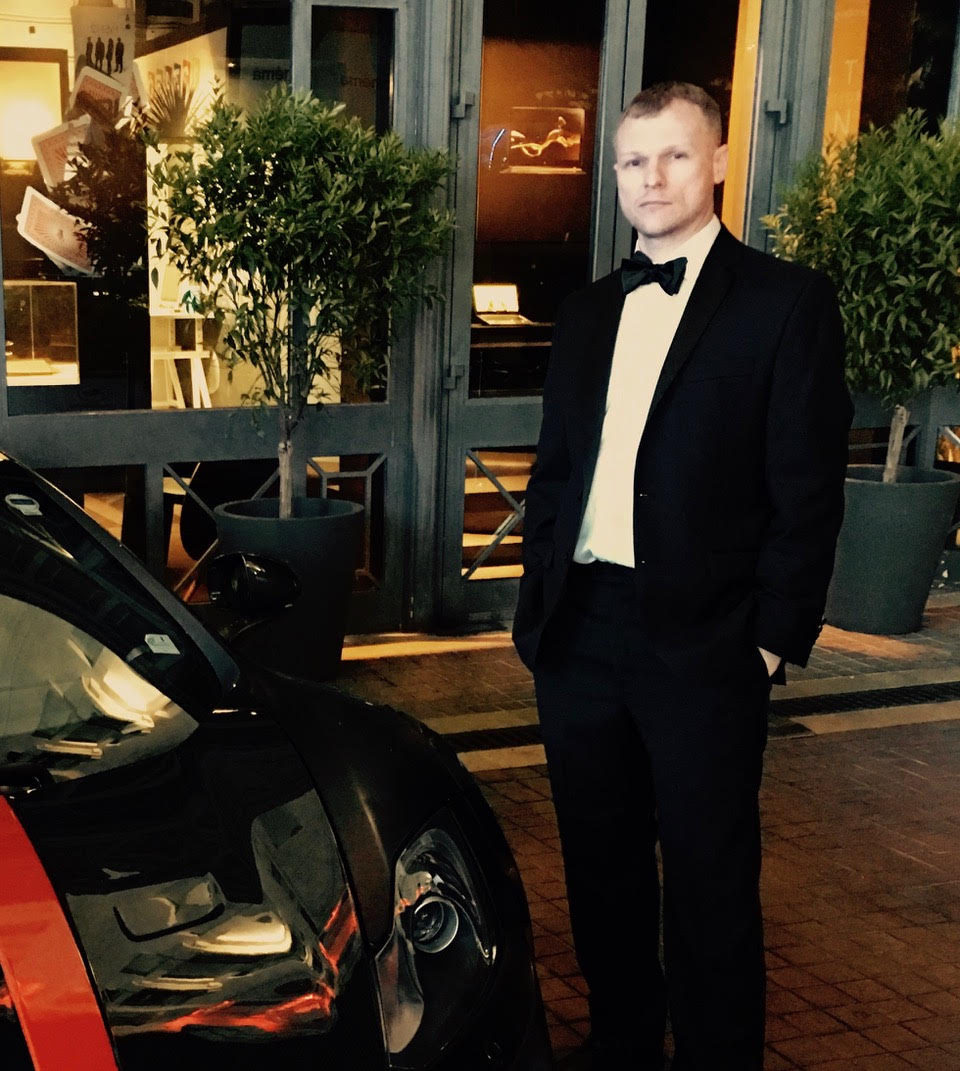
- Born: 29 December; Portland, Oregon, U.S.
- Occupations: Director, Writer, Producer and Editor
- Years active: 1995–present

Brett Eichenberger is an American director, producer, writer, and editor. He is known for independent features, documentaries, and short films. His work includes Light of Mine (2011), Pretty Broken (2018), and the feature documentary A Flash of Beauty: Bigfoot Revealed (2022) along with other documentaries and media productions through his company Resonance Productions.

== Biography ==
Eichenberger was born in Portland, Oregon, and studied film at Portland State University.

He founded Resonance Productions, a media production company that produces feature films, documentaries, music videos, commercials, and branded content. Through Resonance Productions, Eichenberger has also done international work, shooting in locations such as Pakistan and Egypt, and producing content like public service announcements and documentary shorts.

His feature film Light of Mine (2011), written by Jill Remensnyder, was the breakthrough that brought him wider attention. The film premiered at the Ashland Independent Film Festival and was selected for the Breakthrough section at AFI Fest in 2011. It won multiple awards, including Best Director and Best Feature Film at HD Fest (2012), and other festival honors. In 2014, Eichenberger directed By God's Grace, followed by Pretty Broken in 2018, which stars Jillian Clare, Tyler Christopher and Stacy Edwards and was filmed largely in Portland, Oregon. Pretty Broken was produced by Resonance Productions and has been distributed through various digital platforms. Film had its premiere at the 2018 Newport Beach Film Festival and is distributed worldwide by Freestyle Digital Media.

=== Documentary and Other Projects ===
In addition to his narrative features, Eichenberger has directed documentary works, most notably A Flash of Beauty: Bigfoot Revealed (2022) and its sequel A Flash of Beauty: Paranormal Bigfoot (2024).

He is also currently directing Taming the Mouth, a documentary examining the Columbia River jetty system, which explores historical, engineering, and social dimensions of the jetties’ construction and ongoing rehabilitation.

Brett is currently directing two documentary feature films. Taming the Mouth (2026), a documentary examining the Columbia River jetty system, which explores historical, engineering, and social dimensions of the jetties’ construction and ongoing rehabilitation. Brett's other film, Voices in the Wilderness (2026), delves into the enigmatic “Sierra Sounds” captured by hunters, including Ron Morehead, who claimed to have intercepted alleged Bigfoot communication during the 1970s high in Sierra Nevada mountain range.

== Style and themes ==
Eichenberger's work is marked by an interest in deeply human stories set against expansive natural or historical backdrops. His narrative films often explore themes of personal transformation, loss, resilience, and faith. Light of Mine (2011) examines the fragility of perception and identity through the story of a photographer losing his sight, while Pretty Broken (2018) portrays grief, family struggles, and reconciliation with humor and pathos.By God's Grace (2014) weaves themes of forgiveness and spiritual redemption into a contemporary setting.

In his documentary work, Eichenberger gravitates toward overlooked or misunderstood subjects. Projects such as A Flash of Beauty: Bigfoot Revealed (2022) and Paranormal Bigfoot (2024) approach paranormal phenomena with a balance of investigative seriousness and human storytelling. His ongoing documentary Taming the Mouth explores the engineering marvel of the Columbia River jetties, combining historical analysis with cultural and environmental perspectives. Across his filmography, Eichenberger's visual style emphasizes natural landscapes, intimate character moments, and a reflective pacing that allows audiences to immerse themselves in both the human and environmental dimensions of his stories.

=== Filmography ===
Year	Film	Director	Writer	Producer	Note
1995	Insomnia	Yes	No	No	TV series
1998	Cheap Theatrix	Yes	No	No	TV series
2001	The Beautiful One	Yes	No	No	Short film
2002	Long Time No See	Yes	Yes	No	Short film
2005	The Leeward Tide	Yes	Yes	Yes	Short film
2011	Light of Mine	Yes	No	Yes	Feature Film
2014	By God's Grace	Yes	No	No	Feature Film
2016	A Little Something	Yes	Yes	Yes	Short film
2018	Pretty Broken	Yes	No	Yes	Feature Film
2022	A Flash of Beauty: Bigfoot Revealed	Yes	Yes	No	Documentary
2024	A Flash of Beauty: Paranormal Bigfoot	Yes	No	No	Documentary

As Editor

- 2001 - The Beautiful One
- 2002 - Long Time No See
- 2005 - The Leeward Tide
- 2011 - Light of Mine
- 2018 - Pretty Broken
- 2022 - A Flash of Beauty: Bigfoot Revealed
- 2024 - A Flash of Beauty: Paranormal Bigfoot

=== External links ===
- Brett Eichenberger at IMDb
