= List of Out with Dad episodes =

Here are the episodes of the webseries Out with Dad.

== Season 1 ==
Season one aired from July 7, 2010 to October 6, 2010 and consists of 8 episodes. All episodes were written and directed by Jason Leaver, original music by Adrian Ellis.

No.	Title	Running time	Original release date	Extra soundtrack
1.01	"Rose with Vanessa"	05:38	July 7, 2010	"Half Light" by Lara Martin
Viewers are introduced to three main characters in the first episode. Rose Milear and her best friend Vanessa LeMay are studying in Rose's bedroom, when the topic of the status of their friendship/ relationship is brought up. Both are confused about their sexuality, they both decide to share a kiss to determine if their suspicions have and basis in fact. Sharing a kiss, both feel they are none the wiser of their sexuality. Before they can truly discuss the issue Nathan, Rose's father arrives home and suspects something between the pair may have happened.
1.02	"Out To Lunch"	10:01	July 21, 2010	"Heroes" by Dan Beausoleil
Nathan still suspects his daughter is hiding her sexuality from him, seeks advice and guidance on the issue from the internet. Frustrated by the lack of any concise and practical information he turns to Johnny his gay friend. Rose in turn turns to her best friend Kenny who encourages her to apologise to Vanessa. Meeting up Rose outlines very clearly to Vanessa she is not gay.
1.03	"Movie Night with Dad"	10:12	August 4, 2010	TBA
Still conflicted Rose still does not know what to make of the kiss between her and Vanessa, whilst Nathan tries to connect with his daughter. When he arranges a movie night to try to get Rose to open up about her sexuality the attempt fails.
1.04	"Party Out"	05:54	August 18, 2010	"Steady Beating Drum" by Lara Martin; "Side Swept" by Late July; "Time is Wasting" by Dan Beausoleil
Rose, Vanessa and Kenny attend a party, where the kiss is very much still a hot topic between them. It leaves Rose more confused as ever, emotions run high and makes Rose even more distressed.
1.05	"Blind Date with Nathan"	07:26	September 1, 2010	"Insomnia" by Trio Arjento
Whilst Rose attends the party, Nathan seizes the moment to go out on a date with Angela. Nathan keen to offload his worries for his daughter confides in Angela about his suspicious that Rose maybe gay. Angela keen to help offers Nathan her advice. Which in turn Nathan gratefully takes on board.
1.06	"Tea with Dad"	03:09	September 9, 2010	TBA
Nathan and Rose both arrive home, to discuss the evenings events over a cup of tea,
1.07	"Chemistry with Vanessa"	06:43	September 23, 2010	"A Well Kept Secret" by Late July
Rose and Vanessa review a lesson of chemistry together. The kiss very much on their minds the pair try and still make sense of it all but are interrupted by Vanessa's mother. Sensing its time to leave Rose returns home.
1.08	"Out with Kenny"	06:55	October 6, 2010	TBA
After a day in school, Kenny and Rose walk home. Kenny still pinning over Alicia asks Rose for her advice. however Rose has something on her mind, and pays no attention to even what Kenny is saying. She suddenly stops, and out of the blue tells Kenny she is gay much to his delight. She then Spends the evening practicing coming out to Nathan using dolls as props.

== Season 2 ==
Season two aired from July 7, 2011 to July 12, 2012 and consists of 12 episodes. All episodes were written and directed by Jason Leaver, original music by Adrian Ellis.

No.	Title	Running time	Original release date	Extra soundtrack
2.01	"Out with Dad"	14:13	July 7, 2011	TBA
Rose and Nathan sit down for dinner, tentatively Nathan asks if there is anything on Rose's mind. Rose stops eating and decides to finally come out to her father. Nathan reacts positively to the news, both declare they love each other and Nathan will stand by his daughters decision. Then the pair openly discuss her sexuality whilst on the way to school. With new found confidence, Rose spots Vanessa. Vanessa is shocked to learn Rose has come out to her dad and point blank states she is not gay, and calls Rose a queer. Shocking Rose to the core, she breaks down
2.02	"Asking Out Alicia"	04:50	July 21, 2011	TBA
After what just happen Kenny come up and wants her to help him ask out their schoolmate Alicia Van Harren, who reveals she has been wanting him to ask her out all along. But she thought him and Rose were in a relationship.
2.03	"Having it Out"	12:43	August 3, 2011	TBA
Numerous sources claim that the average teenager hears 26 homophobic slurs in a day, though many people do not realize that they hurt. Now that Rose has come out to herself, she feels sick about it and goes to the washroom, where a schoolmate comforts her. Vanessa's mom, Theresa, pays Nathan a visit in order to talk about their daughters; Nathan completely misunderstands and accidentally outs his daughter to Theresa. She is closed-minded about homosexuality, and she reveals that she is going to forbid Vanessa from ever hanging out with Rose again. Rose goes to Vanessa doorstep to try get her admit who she is, but is too scared of her parent and what they will do and it cut by Theresa coming home and saying mean things to Rose and tell her they can't see each other anymore.
2.04	"With Jacob and Vanessa"	03:35	August 17, 2011	TBA
Theresa and her husband are fighting downstairs; Vanessa's brother Jacob fears that he could lose his sister as he talks with Vanessa about their eldest brother, who was pushed away for something that Jacob does not understand. All the while she is crying about losing the person she loves.
2.05	"Striking Out"	12:18	September 1, 2011	"What's Left" by Late July; "Kristy May" by The Elwins; "Every Song Ever Written" by Trio Arjento; "Goodnight Lovers, Goodnight Thieves" by Gavin Slate
Rose learns of her father Nathan's mistake and leaves home in anger. Vanessa is sad about her mother Theresa's resolution of forbidding her to meet up with Rose, but she does not want to be pushed away like her elder brother. Nathan is worried about Rose being away from home and misses his second date with Angela. Kenny is at his home with Alicia when Rose rings his doorbell; Alicia is worried about Rose's role in Kenny's life, but he succeeds in reassuring Alicia, with no need to force Rose to come out.
2.06	"Working it Out"	14:29	September 15, 2011	"Apology" by Dan Beausoleil
Kenny drives Rose home. Nathan tries to apologize to Rose, but she is not willing to forgive because of Vanessa's mother's resolution to keep her away from Vanessa. Nathan asks Johnny for help, and he suggests to attend a PFLAG meeting together. Eventually Nathan and Johnny succeed in convincing Rose.
2.07	"Out with PFLAG, Part I"	12:12	March 2, 2012	TBA
Rose, Nathan, and Johnny attend a PFLAG meeting. The girl that comforted Rose, in the washroom at school, also attends the meeting. The script of the stories told in this episode is partly from true stories submitted by the audience of the web series.
2.08	"Out with PFLAG, Part II"	14:42	April 4, 2012	TBA
Claire Daniels is the name of the girl in the washroom, and she gets to know a little more about Rose during the intermission. Eventually after the intermission Rose and Nathan share. The script of the stories told in this episode is partly from true stories submitted by the audience of the web series.
2.09	"Chatting with Claire"	07:36	April 23, 2012	TBA
Rose and Claire happen to become friends on Facebook.
2.10	"The Museum Outing"	14:13	May 3, 2012	"Good Day" by Robyn Dell'Unto
Rose and Kenny meet Claire at her work, the Scarborough Historical Museum of Toronto; it is a good day for Rose and Claire. Nathan tries to recover from a bad impression by dating Angela again.
2.11	"Out with Doubts"	13:55	June 17, 2012	"It Was Real" by Livi; "White Lies" by Lesley Pike
Rose is at the café with Claire and meets Vanessa by chance; this raises confusion in her feelings. Nathan at work has to deal with a homophobic joke and does not know what to do. Rose at the park has a similar encounter with gossiping schoolmates.
2.12	"Out of Mind"	10:01	July 12, 2012	"Girl Who Stole The Sun" by The Mittenz; "Side Swept" (Remix) by Late July
Rose starts to know Claire a bit better, so they finally happen to talk about Vanessa. When she is alone, Rose starts to think about her feelings, and she is unsure about how to deal with her own confusion.

== Season 3 ==
Season 3 aired from December 6, 2013 to September 2014 and consisted¿ of 22 episodes. It sees a change in the main role of Nathan, as Jonathan Robbins steps into the role.

No.	Title	Running time	Original release date	Extra soundtrack
3.01	"Starting Out"	9:53	December 6, 2013	"Say Your Name" by Girl Who Got Away; "It Feels The Same" by Simon Walls
Rose and Nathan unpack after moving house. Vanessa is having trouble not seeing Rose, and Claire invites Rose over for dinner.
3.02	"Dining In & Out"	11:16	December 7, 2013	"My Lady in July" by Morgan Cameron Ross
Rose has dinner at Claire's house where she meets Claire's mother Marion and brother Daniel. Sharing an intimate moment after dinner, the pair kiss. Arriving home from a business trip Claire's father Ted catches them, profoundly embarrassing Claire. Whom she has not even come out to her father. Meanwhile Nathan takes the opportunity to invite Angela for dinner, but is surprised when Nathan reveals he has not told Rose about their relationship.
3.03	"Storming In & Out"	6:03	December 8, 2013	TBA
Claire and Rose deal with the aftermath of Ted's arrival home. Nathan and Rose discuss the events at Claire's home. Claire keen to clear the air and apologise to Rose for not only misleading her into the face she has contact with her father. But to apologise the position she put her in. Claire upset at recent events asks Rose if she can stay with her until the air is cleared. However Nathan adamant that she can't, leaves Rose upset.
3.04	"Swashbuckling Adventures of Making Out"	7:52	December 9, 2013	TBA
Leaving Rose's house, Claire and Rose head to the cinema to pass the time and take stock. Whilst in the cinema they both kiss and of course are seen by a classmate. Returning home Rose and Nathan discus his reasoning for not letting Claire stay.
3.05	"Outed"	11:29	December 10, 2013	TBA
Back at school a perplexed Rose walks the halls. Spotting her in the hall, Brittney barges her into a set of lockers. Still not knowing why, a concerned Kenny reveals that someone saw her and Claire kissing at the cinema. Visibly sick to her core, Rose takes refuge in the toilets, quickly followed by Claire. Claire is positive and try's to reassure Rose that they are going to be ok, Rose however is unconvinced. Also Vanessa Parent learn that suspected truth that Rose is gay and realize she can't be happy at home
3.06	"Out with Song and Dance"	9:14	December 11, 2013	TBA
Rose still coming to terms with being outed, is consoled by Claire. As the web series descends into a musical. Rose wonders if there is more to life than being gay, whilst Claire confesses her love for her in song. Meanwhile after an argument with her father and mother, Vanessa decides they cannot accept her for who she is and leaves home.
3.07	"Vanessa Alone"	9:08	March 11, 2014	TBA
After walking the streets of Toronto all day Vanessa meets Kayla who invites her to stay at her house.
3.08	"Catching up with Dad"	7:12	March 13, 2014	TBA
Rose and Nathan play catch in the park whilst discussing each other's relationships. Arriving home, they find Vanessa's father Mr LeMay visibly distressed. Nathan and Rose reassure him that Rose has stayed away from Vanessa. He proceeds to tell them she has left home, Rose is inconsolable and both assure Mr LeMay that should they hear anything they will contact him.
3.09	"Vanessa Lost"	9:33	March 18, 2014	TBA
Despite having found a place to take refuge, Vanessa is struggling to cope with being homeless. She continues to form a strong bond with Kayla. Meanwhile, her parents continue to try to find her, with clearly defined reasons to why Vanessa felt the need to leave home.
3.10	"Going Out"	11:18	March 20, 2014	TBA
It’s an emotional time for Rose, as she struggles to make sense of her mixed feelings of worry for Vanessa and growing closeness with Claire. Kenny also reveals his concerns for Vanessa's well being, and brings up a conversation he had with her hinting she was about to leave home. Rose is also confronted with the reality she still harbours feelings for the runaway.
3.11	"Double Date with Dad"	6:43	March 25, 2014	TBA
Rose and Claire are on a date when they bump into Nathan and Angela whom are also on a date. Angel seizing the moment to get to know Rose a little better invites them both to share deserts. Nathan and Rose find the whole situation awkward whilst Claire and Angela take it in their stride. Arriving home Rose and Nathan talk, still feeling awkward, Rose gives Angela her seal of approval much to Nathan's relief.
3.12	"Vanessa's Pain"	7:42	March 27, 2014	TBA
Vanessa wanders the streets, not knowing where to turn next. Seeing Nathan, Rose, Claire and Angela at the restaurant, she returns to the Flop House where she comes into contact with Kyle . Vanessa tries to leave but Kyle forces her to sit down. Kyle proceeds to try and convince her to take a pill, knowing what Kyle is actually demanding. Vanessa refuses to do so and tries to run, however overpowering her Kyle pushes her to floor and forces himself on her. Pushing back, Vanessa manages to escape.
3.13	"Vanessa Runs"	5:48	April 1, 2014	TBA
After escaping the Flop house, she spends a night on a bench. With nowhere else to go she plucks up the courage to seek safety at her brother Matthew apartment. Matthew and his girlfriend Fatima express their concern for her safety and allow her refuge. They ask her if they can contact her mother and father, Vanessa refuses. Vanessa also declares she is bisexual to Matthew. Viewers also learn Vanessa is to be an auntie.
3.14	"Pushed Out"	4:54	April 3, 2014	TBA
Rose and Kenny talk about Vanessa's disappearance when Claire appears. Visibly angry over Brittany not selling her tickets to the formal based on her sexuality. Rose not sharing the same concern asks Claire to show restraint. Riled by Claire, Brittney physically assaults Rose in the locker room with students onlooking. Brittney demands Rose leave the room whilst the rest change. Rose hurt leaves and breaks down at home.
3.15	"Vanessa's Calm"	5:28	September 26, 2014	TBA
Quietly settling at her brother's apartment, Vanessa discusses with him the past events and her attraction to Rose. Looking for someone to whom Vanessa could talk, Fatima proposes Sera, who is Matthew's colleague and a lesbian.
3.16	"Stressing Out"	10:50	September 26, 2014	TBA
Rose is into her thoughts : she remembers the painful change room scene. Nathan notices it and Rose only admits the problem about the fall-formal tickets. Nathan want to fight for this but swears to Rose to leave it. At school, Rose doesn't dare to enter the change room while others are present. And Mr Kelsey, Rose's phys-ed teacher calls Nathan about a concern on the matter. By the end of the school day, Claire and Rose mention the PFLAG meeting coming up that night. Alicia is curious about it...
3.17	"Out with PFLAG, Part III"	20:14	September 26, 2014	TBA
Miller and Danels families attend the PFLAG meeting. Surprise : Alicia is also there. The attendants share their experience without fear of being judged. One common subject for Miller and Danels families appears : they both face the change room issue.
3.18	"Out with PFLAG, Part IV"	8:33	September 26, 2014	TBA
Robin advises the Miller and Danels families what to do about the changing room issue. Nowmee gives advice to Claire and Alicia about building up a gay-straight alliance at their school. Back home, Rose and Nathan discuss about what Rose has experienced at school. They also evoke Rose's birthday, coming soon.
3.19	"Vanessa Meets Sera"	7:47	September 26, 2014	TBA
Vanessa meets Sera, who is a friend of Mathew. Their talk helps Vanessa to see things through.
3.20	"Getting it Out"	12:32	September 26, 2014	TBA
It's revelation day. Rose talks to her Vice-Principal about the change room issue. And, having been asked so by Nathan, Johnny reveals to Angela the secret of Rose's birth and her mom's death. That's enough for one day for Rose : Nathan is asked to come out "for her" to his parents, invited to the birthday barbecue.
3.21	"Vanessa Goes Home"	5:09	September 26, 2014	TBA
Vanessa heads back home. She is welcomed by her begging father.
3.22	"With Family and Friends"	15:54	September 26, 2014	"Steady Beating Drum" by Lara Martin; "Spider Dance" by Map & Key; "27 Degrees" by Blue Cougars
After many hesitations, Nathan succeeds to tell his parents about Rose's homosexuality. The next day is Rose's birthday barbecue. Everybody is there, even a last-minute guest: Vanessa... An emotional moment for Rose, Claire and Vanessa.

== Season 4 ==
No.	Title	Running time	Original release date	Extra soundtrack
4.01	"Drinks with Dad"	8:10	May 5, 2015	TBA
It's the beginning of university for Rose. She and her dad are grabbing a celebratory drink at the local pub. Despite the fact she still lives at home, they must make time to keep up with one another.
4.02	"Reconnecting with Alicia"	7:12	June 4, 2015	TBA
Rose and Alicia reconnect for the first time since the start of university. Their conversation unpacks a lot of questions, and leaves us wondering a lot more.
4.03	"An Island Outing"	10:07	July 2, 2015	TBA
During a much needed day together on The Toronto Islands, Rose and Nathan face the challenges of growing up, while looking back at Nathan's past.
4.04	"Reconnecting with Owen"	5:39	August 6, 2015	TBA
While Rose relaxes at her University Pub, she meets an old acquaintance. For some reason, something about Owen makes her feel she can open up – and lets us in a little about what happened with Vanessa.
4.05	"Smores with Dad"	8:31	September 3, 2015	TBA
Rose and Dad get away from the city for some autumn camping, a tradition they've held for many years. Being up in the Muskoka Region of Ontario and roasting smores jogs Rose's memories of happier times with Vanessa.
4.06	"Elephants in the Room with Alicia"	7:53	October 6, 2015	TBA
Rose and Alicia go for a stroll along the boardwalk in Toronto's Beaches area. Between the two of them are two 'elephants in the room', one named Kenny and the other named Claire.
4.07	"Out Clubbing"	7:44	November 9, 2015	TBA
After a night out at a Toronto club, Rose and Owen debrief. Rose meets someone new...
4.08	"Counselling Vanessa - Session 1"	6:21	December 14, 2015	TBA
Vanessa reluctantly begins seeing a counsellor in the aftermath of her sexual assault.
4.09	"Starting Out, Again"	8:19	December 24, 2015	TBA
Rose and Nathan both have something on their minds. Turns out, similar topics: their respective dating lives.
4.10	"Counselling Vanessa - Session 23"	4:59	January 14, 2016	TBA
It's been roughly six months since we last saw Vanessa, she is seeing her Counsellor again. In this session, she discusses becoming an aunt and what it's like growing up with her mother.
4.11	"Day Drinking with Alicia and Rose"	8:42	January 21, 2016	TBA
Rose and Alicia have had more than a few drinks this afternoon... They get into conversations about the new girl, their upcoming plans - but all is interrupted when Alicia receives a call from none other than: Claire. #awkward
4.12	"Counselling Vanessa - Session 47"	4:58	February 11, 2016	TBA
It's been almost a year since Vanessa has started counselling, and she's not sleeping well again. Her counsellor tries to figure why.
4.13	"Counselling Vanessa - Session 48"	6:46	February 25, 2016	TBA
It's been almost a year since Vanessa has started counselling, and she's not sleeping well again. Her counsellor tries to figure why.
4.14	"Out to the Science Center"	10:57	April 22, 2016	TBA
Rose and new Vanessa go out on a date to The Ontario Science Centre.
4.15	"Heading Out(in 360°)"	10:10	May 2, 2016	TBA
Claire is back in town now, and Rose is getting ready to go out to see her. At the same time, Nathan is getting ready to go out to see Valery. Both of them seem to be procrastinating. It's as if they don't want to see their ex's
4.16	"Reconciling with Claire"	10:37	October 24, 2016	TBA
After much procrastination and reluctance, Rose finally goes to see Claire. Claire forgives Rose for what happened and they end up having sex.
4.17	"Counselling Vanessa – Session Fifty-Two"	7:10	January 12, 2017	TBA
Vanessa continues discussing her sexual assault.
4.18	"Without Regrets"	10:56	October 23, 2076	TBA
Rose talks to herself about her night with Claire and discuss Friendsgiving with Alicia.
4.19	"Dealing with Consequences, Part I"	11:54	October 25, 2017	TBA
Rose and Claire talk about high school and new Vanessa who overhears the truth.
4.20	"Counselling Vanessa - Session 78"	7:54	October 27, 2017	TBA
Vanessa discusses her life goals that she never expected
4.21	"Dealing with Consequences, Part II"	17:04	October 30, 2017	TBA
Nathan and Rose discuss their recent actions.
4.22	"With a Heavy Heart"	5:43	November 1, 2017	TBA
Claire and Rose have an emotional goodbye at the airport.
4.23	"Counselling Dad"	6:15	November 3, 2017	TBA
Nathan goes to Counselling to understand what is wrong with him.

== Season 5 ==
No.	Title	Running time	Original release date	Extra soundtrack
5.01	"Out of Touch"	7:31	November 6, 2017	TBA
It’s been several months since Claire’s visit. Rose and Owen do some overdue catching up in Kensington Market. Later, Rose and Nathan travel north to Honey Harbour, Ontario. While there, Rose has an unexpected encounter with someone from her past: Vanessa LeMay.
5.02	"The Encounter with Vanessa"	6:54	November 6, 2017	TBA
After years of not talking to each other, it is time. Rose and Vanessa hash it out.
5.03	"A New Outlook"	10:19	November 10, 2017	TBA
With dad’s encouragement, Rose follows through on Vanessa’s invitation to join her at the family cottage. It’s time to clear the air between them. Rose confesses that she still has feelings for Vanessa, and they spend the rest of their night kissing in bed.
5.04	"A Quiet Day In"	6:52	November 13, 2017	TBA
After the previous night, there isn't much to be said. Rose and Vanessa have a quiet day in...
5.05	"Figuring it Out"	19:02	November 15, 2017	TBA
After counselling, Nathan realizes he is asexual and manages to work up the courage to tell Rose. Meanwhile, Rose is figuring things out about herself. She says that so much has changed, and she doesn't know what the future holds for her and Vanessa, but hopes for the best. Nathan and Rose meet up with Vanessa at the park. Nathan decides to go home and the series concludes with Rose and Vanessa holding hands as they walk together, possibly hinting at a future romance.
