= Wendy Glazier =

Canadian actress

Wendy Glazier is an English-speaking Canadian actress (region of Toronto). She is mainly known in the world of web series as Theresa LeMay, one of the main roles in the many-times-awarded LGBT web series Out With Dad.

== Filmography ==
=== Cinema ===
==== Movies ====
- 2009 - Son of the Sunshine : Bank Teller
- 2014 - The Hotel Dieu : Dawn

==== Short films ====
- 2012 - Green Apple : Amanda Wellington

=== Internet ===
==== Webseries ====
- 2010/... - Out With Dad (including Vanessa's Story, Dir. : Jason Leaver) : Theresa LeMay
- 2012-2013 - Clutch (S2E02, S2E06, S2E09) : Agatha

== Nominations and awards ==
She was nominated and received the following awards:

=== 2012 ===
3rd Indie Soap Awards (2012) (1 only winner in a category)

- Nominations: Best Breakthrough Performance (All shows) for " Out with Dad "

LA Web Series Festival 2012 (multiple prizes in the same category)

- Award : Outstanding Ensemble Cast in a Drama for " Out with Dad " :
  - Kate Conway, Will Conlon, Lindsey Middleton, Corey Lof, Laura Jabalee, Darryl Dinn, Jacob Ahearn, Wendy Glazier, Robert Nolan.

Academy of WebTelevision Awards 2013

- Nomination : Best Ensemble Performance for " Out with Dad "

=== 2015 ===
Academy of WebTelevision Awards 2015

- Award : Best Ensemble Performance for " Out with Dad "
