= Will Conlon =

Canadian actor

Will Conlon (born 29 July 1975) is a Canadian actor, best known for his role on Out With Dad.

== Filmography ==
=== Cinema ===
==== Movies ====
- 2013 – Blood Riders: The Devil Rides with Us : Gerhard

=== Television ===
==== TV Movies ====
- 2015 – Cooked : Bill

==== TV Series ====
- 2013 – Rookie Blue (S4E05) : William Bouchard
- 2014 – Web of Lies (S1E01) : Wade Ridley

=== Internet ===
==== Webseries ====
- 2010/... – Out With Dad (Seasons 1 & 2) : Nathan Miller
- 2012 – Clutch (S2E01) : The Double Crosser
- 2013 – Versus Valerie (S1E03) : Randy

== Nominations and awards ==
=== 2011 ===
2nd annual Indie Soap Awards (1 only winner in a category)

- Nominations: Outstanding Lead Actor for "Out with Dad "

LA Web Series Festival 2011 (multiple prizes in the same category)

- Award : Outstanding Lead Actor in a Drama Series for "Out with Dad "

=== 2012 ===
3rd annual Indie Soap Awards (1 only winner in a category)

- Nominations: Best Actor (Drama) for "Out with Dad "

2011 Indie Intertube

- Award : Best Actor in a Drama for "Out with Dad "

LA Web Series Festival 2012 (multiple prizes in the same category)

- Award : Outstanding Ensemble Cast in a Drama for "Out with Dad "
  - Kate Conway, Will Conlon, Lindsey Middleton, Corey Lof, Laura Jabalee, Darryl Dinn, Jacob Ahearn, Wendy Glazier, Robert Nolan.

=== 2013 ===
4th Indie Soap Awards (2013) (1 only winner in a category)

- Nomination: Best Guest Appearance (Drama) for "Clutch "
