= Pretty Broken =

- Directed by: Brett Eichenberger
- Written by: Jill Remensnyder
- Produced by: Susan Bernhardt, Jillian Clare, Brett Eichenberger, and Jill Remensnyder
- Starring: Jillian Clare, Preston Bailey, Stacy Edwards, and Tyler Christopher.
- Cinematography: Michael Ferry
- Production companies: Resonance Productions, Leonian
- Release date: 2018
- Country: United States
- Language: English

Pretty Broken is an American dramedy film that follows Lindsey Lou (Jillian Clare), as she tries to learn the steps after the death of her father. The film also stars Preston Bailey as Monty Lou (Lindsey's younger brother), Stacy Edwards as Caroline Lou (their mother), and Tyler Christopher as Jerry Carlyle.

Resonance Productions and Leonian Pictures are producing. Eichenberger is directing from Jill Remensnyder's script about an unemployed college dropout on the verge of divorce who finds herself at her childhood home while her family grieves the death of her father.

The film was shot in its entirety in Portland, Oregon over the course of a year. It was previously titled Free For All.

Pretty Broken started gaining attention when General Hospital star Tyler Christopher came on board as the male lead opposite Jillian Clare.

The film premiered at the 2018 Newport Beach Film Festival.

== Cast ==
- Jillian Clare as Lindsey Lou
- Tyler Christopher as Jerry Carlyle
- Stacy Edwards as Caroline Lou
- Preston Bailey as Monty Lou
- Adam Chambers as Scott
- Peter Holden as Montgomery Lou
- Austin Hillebrecht as Liam Lou
- Cosondra Sjostrom as Sparrow
- Todd A. Robinson as Wallace
- Craig Michaelson as Chris
