= Miss Behave (web series) =

Television series

- Genre: Teen drama; Soap opera; Web series
- Created by: Susan Bernhardt
- Written by: Susan Bernhardt; Frances Gilbert
- Directed by: Scott McKinsey
- Starring: Jillian Clare
- Theme music composer: A Deux
- Country of origin: United States
- Original language: English
- No. of seasons: 3
- No. of episodes: 26

Production
- Executive producers: Susan Bernhardt; Jillian Clare
- Producers: Scott McKinsey; Gary Hartshorn; Shawn Hartshorn; Patrika Darbo
- Cinematography: Kevin Patrick Wright; Vincent Steib
- Production company: Leonian Pictures

Original release
- Release: June 24, 2010 – July 26, 2012

Miss Behave is a teen drama web series produced between June 2010 and July 2012. Created and executive produced by Susan Bernhardt, it stars Jillian Clare as Malibu teen Victoria "Tori" Archer and is streamed at www.MissBehave.tv.

== Cast ==
- Jillian Clare as Victoria "Tori" Archer
- Brett DelBuono as Dylan
- Jenna Stone as Danielle
- Trevor Nelson as William "Billy" Archer
- Bianca Magick as Tasha
- Jamison Tate as Christian
- James Rustin as Alex
- Michael Bolten as Noah
- Marco James as Riley
- Jacee Jule as Kristina
- Patrika Darbo as Dr. Freed
- Darin Brooks as Blake Owens
- Eric Martsolf as Marcus Dunne
- Terri Garber as Elizabeth "The Queen" Archer (guest)
- Bobby Preston as Cody
- Madisen Beaty as Sam

== Production ==
In 2012, Garber was cast as Tori's mother Elizabeth Archer for the series finale episode, and a spin-off series called Reign, starring Garber, was announced.

== Awards and nominations ==
Year	Award	Category	Result	Ref.
2011	2nd Indie Soap Awards	Indie Soap of the Year; Outstanding Lead Actor: Trevor Nelson; Outstanding Lead Actress: Jillian Clare; Outstanding Supporting Actor: Marco James; Breakthrough Performance: Bianca Magick; Outstanding Writing: Susan Bernhardt; Outstanding Use of Music; Fan's Choice Award; Best Storyline: Tori's blackout	Nominated	
2012	3rd Indie Soap Awards	Best Use of Music	Won	
2012	3rd Indie Soap Awards	Best Actress (Drama): Jillian Clare; Best Guest Appearance (Drama): Patrika Darbo; Best Cinematography: Kevin Patrick Wright; Fan's Choice Award	Nominated	
2013	4th Indie Soap Awards	Best Guest Appearance (Drama): Terri Garber	Won	
2013	4th Indie Soap Awards	Best Directing (Drama): Scott McKinsey; Best Actress (Drama): Jillian Clare; Best Ensemble (Drama); Best Breakout Performance: Brett DelBuono; Best Soundtrack	Nominated	
