= Alien Abduction (2014 film) =

2014 film by Matty Beckerman

- Directed by: Matty Beckerman
- Written by: Robert Lewis
- Produced by: Matty Beckerman; Cathy Beckerman; Lawrence Bender
- Starring: Katherine Sigismund; Corey Eid; Riley Polanski; Jillian Clare; Jeff Bowser; Peter Holden
- Cinematography: Luke Geissbuhler
- Edited by: Steve Mirkovich
- Music by: Ben Weinman
- Production companies: Exclusive Media Group, Big Picture, Next Entertainment
- Distributed by: IFC Midnight
- Release date: April 4, 2014
- Running time: 85 minutes
- Country: United States
- Language: English
- Box office: $12,897

Alien Abduction (also known under the working title of The Morris Family Abduction) is a 2014 American found-footage science fiction horror film and the directorial debut of Matty Beckerman. The movie was released to VOD on April 4, 2014, and also had a limited theatrical run. The film stars Riley Polanski as an autistic 11-year-old boy who records his ordeal as an alien abductee.

== Plot ==
In a flash-forward, a figure grabs a camera and walks through a murky corridor with audible human screams. The figure puts the camera in a disposal chute, which opens into space in Earth orbit, and the camera falls to Earth. Information on-screen then reveals the footage about to be screened is being used as part of Project Blue Book, regarding an incident in 2011 where 27 people vanished near Brown Mountain, North Carolina.

Riley Morris, an autistic boy, keeps a video journal while on a family camping trip to Brown Mountain with his father Peter, his mother Katie, and his siblings Corey and Jillian. On the first night of their trip, Riley is startled by flashes of light outside of the tent in the middle of the night, and all three siblings watch three stationary lights in the sky that suddenly move away and vanish.

Driving to their next camping site on a foggy mountain road the following morning, the family are sidetracked when their GPS mysteriously misdirects them to an isolated route. They lose their cellphone signals, and the car eventually runs low on gas. A dead crow unexpectedly falls beside the car, shortly before the family reach a tunnel that is blocked by recently-abandoned vehicles. Peter, Corey and Riley leave their car to investigate, while Katie stays behind with Jillian. Personal belongings are scattered around some of the empty cars, and it appears the missing occupants were forcefully removed from their vehicles. Peter sees a humanoid silhouette at the end of the tunnel and calls out. Upon realizing the approaching figure is not human, he tells the boys to run. He is engulfed in light and convulses before disappearing.

The boys reunite with Katie and Jillian. As they try to drive away, a murder of crows falls on their car, which shuts down. They hear a blaring sound and flee to a cabin they passed earlier. The cabin's owner, Sean, is a rustic recluse who is initially hostile towards the family, but changes his mind when he hears his guard dog being attacked by something that followed them from the tunnel. Sean and the family barricade themselves inside his house for the evening. Sean explains that the Brown Mountain Lights and mysterious abductions have been a local recurrence for centuries. After receiving a radio message from his brother Scott, Sean leaves to look for him.

The cabin is eventually breached and in an effort to save his family, Corey hides the others in the cellar, blocking the door, before alien beings enter and abduct him. The remaining members of the family are saved by Sean, who explains that Scott was also abducted and takes them to his truck, planning to drive them back to town down the mountain. The aliens find the group, and Sean tells the others to head to a nearby barn and take refuge. Sean catches up with them, and the group attempt to leave the barn, but the aliens return and Katie and Sean are abducted. Riley and Jillian take refuge deep in the woods for the night, hiding from the aliens.

Climbing down the mountain at dawn, Riley and Jillian see a town in the valley below and soon find a road, but their hopes are dashed when it leads back to the tunnel where Peter was abducted. A police car arrives, but the aliens return and abduct the policeman, Jillian, and Riley, who is still clinging to the camera. The remaining footage shows a rapid ascension into orbit, before cutting to the footage from the beginning of the film. After the camera falls back to Earth, two men in respirators and Hazmat suits are seen taking it away in a U.S. Air Force van.

In a mid-credits scene, one year later, a North Carolina state trooper finds Peter huddled on a bridge, naked, disheveled, and in a state of shock. The fate of the rest of the family is uncertain, but comments made by the police officer on his radio suggest that Peter is not the only member of the family to have been found.

== Cast ==
- Katherine Sigismund as Katie Morris
- Corey Eid as Corey Morris
- Riley Polanski as Riley Morris
- Jillian Clare as Jillian Morris
- Jeff Bowser as Sean
- Peter Holden as Peter Morris
- Jordan Turchin as Officer James
- Kelley Hinman as Park Ranger

== Production ==
Beckerman was inspired to create Alien Abduction while he was living in North Carolina and heard a local legend about how strange lights had been seen on a nearby mountain ridge and that people claimed to have been abducted while viewing them. He also drew inspiration from director Alfred Hitchcock and included a scene of several dozen birds as tribute to him. While working on the basic script, Beckerman and scriptwriter Robert Lewis wanted to have a valid rationale for Riley to continue filming even when things became dangerous, and they decided to use it as a coping mechanism for Riley after a psychologist informed Beckerman that he had previously treated an autistic child who videotaped everything that he did. Lewis completed the script prior to filming, but Beckerman chose to allow the actors to ad-lib their lines as a way of allowing them to get into character more easily. Filming took place in North Carolina in Burke County, Avery County, Watauga County, and Bryson City.

== Reception ==
On review aggregator Rotten Tomatoes, the film holds an approval rating of 29%, based on 17 reviews with an average rating of 4.4/10. Metacritic gives the film a weighted average score of 46 out of 100, based on 10 critics, indicating "mixed or average" reviews.

Common praise for the film centered upon Riley's use of his camcorder as a coping mechanism for an autistic boy, as reviewers felt that it gave a good rationale for Riley to continue filming "when any sane person would stop shooting and start running". Criticism for the movie centered upon what the reviewers saw as an overly generic plotline and an overabundance of jump scares.
