= Mexico City (film) =

- Directed by: Richard Shepard
- Written by: Richard Shepard; Jonathan Stern
- Starring: Stacy Edwards; Robert Patrick
- Release date: 2000
- Running time: 90 minutes
- Country: Canada
- Language: English

Mexico City is a 2000 Canadian film directed and co-written by Richard Shepard, the story of a grieving woman searching for her brother who has gone missing on holiday in Mexico City.

== Plot ==
The film opens with a brief montage of vintage black and white film clips promoting tourism in Mexico City, saying, "But that is not the Mexico City of today," before a dazzling series of scenes of the colorful, modern capital are shown. We see an older couple in a gated home as he gets ready to go to work, before he is kidnapped on the street in a daring ploy. The news reports the Mexican president's doctor was kidnapped and eventually murdered in an attempt by political opponents to show he cannot even protect his own administration officials from the corruption of his police forces.

Mitch Cobb and her brother, Sam, arrive in the city on their way to Oaxaca to do some exploring. In the taxi Mitch finally tells Sam the whole truth about seeing her husband kiss his lover on the street as she drove by with the kids after picking them up from school, just before they are hit by a truck and the children are killed. Her husband blamed her, and Mitch went along with her brother on this trip after the divorce to try help him stay clean off drugs and out of trouble. Sam has recently learned his girlfriend is pregnant, and he doesn't know what to do. So Sam leaves Mitch at the Hotel Majestic and visits some bars.

The next morning Sam has not come back to the hotel. Mitch begins a frantic search, her concerns dismissed by the hotel staff, who warn her against involving the local police, and Ambassador Mills, who introduces her to the city police chief at the consulate, mocking her brother as a druggie who got lost on a bender. She remembers Pedro, the taxi driver who drove them from the airport, who offers to help her look for $100 a day. They finally find the bar where Sam was last seen, and eventually track his killer, a gang lord from the bar, confirming they have the right man when his driver appears wearing Sam's orange baseball cap, eventually confessing they took his camera. Her bravura after being threatened gets her both back, and they are allowed to leave.

After Mitch tells the consul how she found the camera she is knocked out by an intruder at the hotel who steals it, and the Ambassador is suddenly very interested in what might be on the film, because the president's doctor was shot behind the same bar where Sam was last seen. The gang lord swears they beat him after he ran out of the bathroom in a panic, for daring to come onto their turf, but left him alive.

She tells the Ambassador she already sent the film to be developed, and after Pedro helps her get the photos, he drops her at the consul's safe house where they see the doctor executed from the bathroom window of the bar, in Sam's photos, before her brother runs out in a flashback scene. Within minutes the safe house is overrun by the Mexico City Police, the Ambassador and everyone else is killed except Mitch, hiding in a bathroom with the photos. She takes a gun with her as she flees.

She seeks refuge in a church, then Pedro volunteers to drive her to the Texas border. In talking a little about their own lives, Pedro gently encourages her to consider making a new family for herself. 10 kilometers from the border a Mexico City police car stops them. Mitch shoots the officer with the gun she took from the safe house before they can be executed; Pedro says not to worry about him, as he drops her near the border crossing. As she walks across she is brutally arrested, with the Mexican guards and American guards in an armed standoff. She is soon exonerated, when the photos she left at the church are given to the authorities showing the doctor's execution by a known assassin.

Sometime later Mitch and Sam's young son are seen running on a beautiful beach, where Mitch is taking photos, until she hands him the camera, and he takes a photo of her, smiling in the sun.

== Cast ==
- Stacy Edwards as Mitch Cobb
- Jorge Robles as Pedro
- Johnny Zander as Sam
- Robert Patrick as Ambassador Mills
- Carlos Sanz as Lieutenant Menendez
- Daniel Roebuck as Chris
- Maura Tierney as Pam, On Phone (voice)
- Alexander Gould as Peter Cobb
- Dyllan Christopher as Max
