= Stacy Edwards =

American actress

- Occupations: Actress; producer
- Years active: 1986–present
- Known for: In the Company of Men; Chicago Hope; Santa Barbara; Primary Colors

Stacy Edwards is an American actress. She appeared in a number of B movies before her breakthrough role in the 1997 black comedy film In the Company of Men, for which she received Independent Spirit Award for Best Female Lead nomination. Edwards later had roles in films such as Primary Colors (1998), Black and White (1999), and Driven (2001), and was a regular cast member in the drama series Chicago Hope (1997–1999).

== Career ==
Edwards began her career on daytime television. She portrayed Hayley Benson on the daytime soap opera Santa Barbara from 1986 to 1988. (Julia Roberts had unsuccessfully auditioned for the role.) Edwards spent the following decade appearing in an episodes of television shows such as 21 Jump Street, Quantum Leap, L.A. Law, and Murder, She Wrote, and B movies include Relentless 3 and Skeeter. She also was regular cast member in the comedy-drama series Sons and Daughters in 1991.

In 1997, Edwards starred alongside Aaron Eckhart in the black comedy film In the Company of Men, for which she received Independent Spirit Award for Best Female Lead nomination. She also starred in the drama series Chicago Hope as Dr. Lisa Catera for two seasons from 1997 to 1999. In 1998, Edwards appeared as Jennifer Rogers in Mike Nichols' comedy-drama film Primary Colors, playing the lesbian lover of Kathy Bates' character. She later co-starred in films Black and White (1999), The Bachelor (1999), The Next Best Thing (2000), and Driven (2001). She also starred opposite Johnathon Schaech in the 1998 television movie Houdini. As lead actress, she starred in Four Dogs Playing Poker and Mexico City in 2000.

During the 2000s and 2010s, Edwards had many guest-starring roles in various television shows, including CSI: Crime Scene Investigation, Law & Order: Special Victims Unit, NCIS, House, Veronica Mars, Criminal Minds, Private Practice, The Mentalist, Hawaii Five-0, Castle, Grey's Anatomy, How to Get Away with Murder, and Shameless. She also had a recurring role in the series The Lying Game from 2011 to 2012.

== Filmography ==
=== Film ===
Year	Title	Role	Notes
1986	Submiss	Woman	Short film
1990	Spontaneous Combustion	Peggy Bell	
1993	Private Lessons II	Mrs. Cooper	
1993	Relentless 3	Toni Keely	
1993	Skeeter	Mary Ann	
1995	The Fear	Becky	
1996	The Cottonwood	Danielle Rose	
1997	In the Company of Men	Christine	Taormina Film Fest Award for Best Actress; Nominated — Independent Spirit Award for Best Female Lead; Nominated — Chicago Film Critics Association Award for Most Promising Actress
1997	Men Seeking Women	Jennifer	
1997	Tumbling After	Jill Gates	Short film
1998	Primary Colors	Jennifer Rogers	
1999	Black and White	Sheila King	
1999	The Bachelor	Zoe	
2000	The Next Best Thing	Finn	
2000	Four Dogs Playing Poker	Holly	
2000	Mexico City	Mitch Cobb	
2001	Driven	Lucretia "Luc" Jones	
2001	Prancer Returns	Denise Holton	Nominated — DVD Exclusive Award for Best Actress
2002	Local Boys	Jessica Dobson	
2002	Joshua	Maggie	
2002	Speakeasy	Sophie Hickman	
2007	Superbad	Jane, Evan's Mom	
2008	Chronic Town	Emily	
2013	The Bling Ring	Mrs. Hall, Marc's Mom	
2014	The Devil's Hand	Susan	
2018	Pretty Broken	Caroline Lou	
2022	Alex/October	Sara	

=== Television ===
Year	Title	Role	Notes
1986-1988	Santa Barbara	Hayley Benson Capwell	Series regular Nominated — Soap Opera Digest Award for Outstanding Newcomer: Daytime
1988	Jake and the Fatman	Kimberley Bauer	Episode: "I'll Be Seeing You"
1988	Glory Days	Tracy Moran	Television film
1988	21 Jump Street	Rebecca Sanders	Episode: "Whose Choice Is It Anyway?"
1989	Valerie	Sara	Episodes: "Boy Meets Girl" and "Boy Loses Girl"
1989	Dinner at Eight	Paula Jordan	Television film
1989	L.A. Law	Nicole Corry	Episode: "Placenta Claus Is Coming to Town"
1990	Quantum Leap	Elisabeth Spokane	Episode: "Animal Frat - October 19, 1967"
1990	Father Dowling Mysteries	Laurie Bascom	Episode: "The Perfect Couple Mystery"
1990	Murder, She Wrote	Officer Frances Xavier Rawley	Episode: "O'Malley's Luck"
1991	Sons and Daughters	Lindy Hammersmith	Series regular, 7 episodes
1992	The Hat Squad	Brian's Mother	Episode: "Pilot"
1992	L.A. Law	Sydney Peters	Episode: "Helter Shelter"
1995	Murder, She Wrote	Elaine Brown	Episode: "Film Flam"
1995	Matlock	Rachel Bauer	Episode: "The Scam"
1996	Innocent Victims	Barbara Richardson	Television film
1996	Pacific Blue	Elaine Weinstein	Episodes: "Pilot" and "Captive Audience"
1997	Silk Stalkings	Mildred "Millie" Austin	Episode: "callme@murder.com"
1998	Houdini	Bess Houdini	Television film
1997-1999	Chicago Hope	Dr. Lisa Catera	Series regular, 44 episodes Nominated — Screen Actors Guild Award for Outstanding Performance by an Ensemble in a Drama Series (1998)
2001	The Fugitive	Jenny Butler	Episodes: "Jenny" and "Strapped"
2002	Without a Trace	Emily Muller	Episode: "He Saw, She Saw"
2002	Touched by an Angel	Lorena	Episode: "A Feather on the Breath of God"
2003	CSI: Crime Scene Investigation	Vickie Winston	Episode: "Feeling the Heat"
2004	Cold Case	Susan Cardiff	Episode: "Resolutions"
2004	Law & Order: Special Victims Unit	Meredith Rice	Episode: "Head"
2004	Back When We Were Grownups	Biddy	Television film
2004	NCIS	Commander Janice Byers	Episode: "Heart Break"
2004	House	Lucy Palmeiro	Episode: "The Socratic Method"
2005	CSI: NY	Debbie Montenassi	Episode: "Tanglewood"
2005	Numbers	Gail Hoke	Episode: "Sacrifice"
2006	Boston Legal	District Attorney Chelios	Episode: "The Ass Fat Jungle"
2006	Night Stalker	Linda Caleca	Episode: "The Sea"
2006	Veronica Mars	Stephanie Denenberg	Episode: "The Quick and the Wed"
2006	Standoff	Cathy Barnes	Episode: "Circling"
2007	Criminal Minds	Charlotte Cutler	Episode: "Ashes and Dust"
2007	Shark	Gail Buckner	Episode: "Strange Bedfellows"
2007	Murder 101: If Wishes Were Horses	Diana Brawley	Television film
2007	Private Practice	Maria Wilson	Episode: "In Which We Meet Addison, a Nice Girl from Somewhere Else"
2007	Ghost Whisperer	Liz Sinclair	Episode: "Bad Blood"
2008	Eleventh Hour	Miss Catherine Bonatelli	Episode: "Savant"
2008-2009	The Unit	Marian Reed	Episodes: "Inquisition" and "The Spear of Destiny"
2009	Lie to Me	Dr. Christina Knowlton	Episode: "Do No Harm"
2010	Hawthorne	Mary Davis	Episode: "Picture Perfect"
2010	The Mentalist	Concetta Wale	Episode: "Cackle-Bladder Blood"
2010	CSI: NY	Grace Travers	Episode: "Damned If You Do"
2010	Terriers	Beth / Elizabeth Komack	Episode: "Ring-A-Ding-Ding"
2011	Hawaii Five-0	Rebecca Brown	Episode: "Powa Maka Moana"
2011	Make It or Break It	Musette	Episodes: "The Buddy System" and "Life or Death"
2011	Harry's Law	Corinne Waters	Episodes: "There Will Be Blood" and "Sins of the Father"
2011–2012	The Lying Game	Annie Hobbs	Recurring role, 5 episodes
2012	Grey's Anatomy	Kathleen Wheeler	Episode: "The Girl with No Name"
2013	Castle	Jessica Banks	Episode: "Watershed"
2014	How to Get Away with Murder	Gretchen Thomas	Episode: "He Has a Wife"
2015	Shameless	Laura Shelton	Episodes: "I'm the Liver" and "Rite of Passage"
2015	Babysitter's Black Book	Bonnie	Television film
2015	Rosewood	Judy Sanders	Episode: "Fireflies and Fidelity"
2016	Pure Genius	Constance Durand	Episode: "Around the World in Eight Kidneys"
2017	The Fosters	Deb Baker	Episode: "Dirty Laundry"

=== Awards and nominations ===
Awards
Year	Award	Category	Production	Result
1988	Soap Opera Digest Awards	Soap Opera Digest Award for Outstanding Newcomer: Daytime	Santa Barbara	Nominated
1997	Taormina Film Festival Award	Taormina Film Fest Award for Best Actress	In the Company of Men	Won
1998	Independent Spirit Awards	Independent Spirit Award for Best Female Lead	In the Company of Men	Nominated
1998	Chicago Film Critics Association Award	Chicago Film Critics Association Award for Most Promising Actress	In the Company of Men	Nominated
1998	Screen Actors Guild Awards	Outstanding Performance by an Ensemble in a Drama Series	Chicago Hope	Nominated
2001	Video Premiere Award	DVD Exclusive Award for Best Actress	Prancer Returns	Nominated
