= Clutch (web series) =

2011 Canadian web series

- Genre: Thriller
- Created by: Jonathan Robbins
- Written by: Jonathan Robbins; Matthew Carvery; Charles Barangan; Lea Lawrynowicz; Alex Gheorghe; Jeff Sinasac; Emily Schooley
- Starring: Elitsa Bako; Peter Hodgins; Lea Lawrynowicz; Jeff Sinasac; Matthew Carvery; Alexandra Elle; Katherine Fogler; Caitlynne Medrek; Emily Schooley; Anais Rozencwajg
- Country of origin: Canada
- No. of seasons: 2
- No. of episodes: 19

Production
- Producers: Jonathan Robbins; Wil Wong; Matthew Carvery
- Cinematography: Jonathan Robbins; Alex Gheorghe; Geoff Bland
- Running time: 6-14 minutes

Original release
- Release: June 14, 2011 – May 27, 2013

Clutch is a Canadian crime/thriller web series created by Jonathan Robbins. It premiered on Vimeo in May 2011, but has since found a home on other broadcast sites such as Koldcast TV, Blip and JTS.TV. The webisodes are also available via DVD and special, purchasable USB keys.

The show follows the exploits of Kylie (Elitsa Bako), a pickpocket, forced to go on the run from a crime syndicate run by Marcel Obertovitch (Peter Hodgins), after her boyfriend, Matt (Matthew Carvery), betrays him. She teams up with a prostitute named Bridget (Lea Lawrynowicz) and fellow pickpocket Mike (Jeff Sinasac) to go on the offensive and rob Marcel.

== History ==
Clutch was inspired by the short film Your Ex-Lover Is Dead, previously written and produced by Jonathan Robbins. Shooting began in November 2010.

== Format ==
Those episodes which require it begin with a warning that "This Episode of Clutch contains scenes with Violence, Nudity and Coarse Language. Viewer Discretion is advised."

In Season One, each episode concludes with the voice-over, "Next time on Clutch," followed by a brief teaser of upcoming events and closes with the song "Seven Day Mile" sung by Glen Hansard.

Season Two dispenses with the teaser for the upcoming episode and closes with the song "Down" by Esza Kaye.

== Plot ==
=== Season 1 (2011) ===
Kylie returns home from a night of pocket picking to find two goons, including Hatchet Man (Buzz Koffman), threatening to cut off the hand of her boyfriend, Matt. Matt had gotten involved with a courier job for crime boss Marcel, and had failed to deliver the $50,000 he was supposed to. Offering herself in sexual trade, Kylie distracts then dispatches the goons, then goes on the run.

She takes up residency in a seedy motel where she befriends the prostitute, Bridget. She then recommences her pocket picking lifestyle, unaware that her actions are being observed by fellow pickpocket, Mike.

Mike corners Kylie in an alley and draws her attention to the fact that both police and local crime organizations have noted her stepped up pocket picking activities. He offers her an alternative with a much bigger heist, suggesting she pose as Marcel's personal dominatrix, Raven (Alexandra Elle), and once he's tied up, abscond with the briefcase of cash he carries with him.

Together with Bridget, Mike and Kylie infiltrate the fetish dungeon Marcel frequents, where Kylie assumes the role of Raven. The heist does not go off as planned, though, when several of Marcel's armed guards realize something is amiss, and Hatchet Man and Matt, who have been trailing Kylie, catch up to her. After a bloody shootout, Mike, Kylie and Bridget flee in Hatchet Man's Ferrari, leaving Matt to fend for himself.

=== Season 2 (2012-2013) ===
In the aftermath of the disastrous robbery of Season 1, everyone's gone their separate ways. Kylie is in hiding, Mike has returned to his pocket picking lifestyle, and Matt has actually been recruited by Marcel and become secretly entangled with Marcel's daughter, Lex (Caitlynne Medrek). Raven's dungeon has been shut down, and she's been forced into becoming Marcel's personal dominatrix, while her former employees have been forced into prostitution.

Marcel abducts Bridget and forces her into revealing Kylie's location. Bridget is then forced into the prostitution ring, as well.

Matt reconnects with Mike when he and Lex are sent to collect on a debt Mike owes, during which time, Matt fakes Mike's death.

In Marcel's cathouse, Bridget and fellow sex-slave, Jordan (Katherine Fogler), begin a relationship. But tormented by the guilt of having given up Kylie, Bridget takes her own life, spurring Jordan to seek to kill Marcel. She corners Raven, mistakenly believing she is a willing accomplice of Marcel's, but the two hatch a plan to join forces to take down Marcel together.

Their quest leads them to Mike, who has connections in the arms trafficking world. Learning of Bridget's death, and feeling no end of guilt for involving everyone in the failed robbery that started all this, he reluctantly agrees to find them weapons.

Raven learns where Kylie has been taken, and uses this to leverage Matt into joining their cause. Matt then plays off this guilt to get Mike to commit more than mere weapons.

Marcel gathers many of the girls for a sale, whereupon the girls retrieve their hidden weapons and unleash hell on the sex traffickers. Marcel escapes, and Lex is driven off by Michelle (Emily Schooley).

Matt and Mike steal aboard an escaping van and end up at the holding house where Kylie was last known to be. Posing as buyers, they infiltrate the house. Unknown to them, Agent Kriss (Katya Gardner) of the FBI has already allowed herself to be captured, and has a plan in place with her partner to take down the trafficking ring. A young girl named Nicole (Jillian Clare) has also recently been captured.

Darius (Tom Konkle), the boss of the trafficking ring, believes Matt and Mike to be FBI agents and shoots Agent Kriss, whereupon her partner begins an assault from the outside. Together with Nicole, Matt and Mike manage to escape, but not before Agent Kriss reveals that Kylie had in fact been there.

== Main cast ==
- Kylie is fearless and aggressive, but with a soft spot for those she sees as victimized. She is a self-taught pickpocket and, at the start of the series, is dating Matt, who she intends to marry. Kylie is portrayed by Elitsa Bako.
- Matt is the opposite of Kylie, cowardly and conniving. He begins the series working as a courier for Marcel, though he betrays his boss and steals $50,000, which is what starts all the trouble for Kylie in the first place. He later offers to sell Kylie into sexual slavery to save his own life. (Clutch: Episode 1) Matt is played by Matthew Carvery.
- Marcel Obertovitch is the local crime lord. He is a creature of extreme habit, and particular fetishes, visiting the same dominatrix after every business deal, and taking her out to dinner every Tuesday. He is vicious, ruthless, and casual about killing. Marcel is portrayed by Peter Hodgins.
- Hatchet Man, sometimes called Hatch, is Marcel's right-hand man. His right eye was put out by Marcel and he serves his boss with a growing resentment. His preferred method of killing is with hatchets, hence his name. He is also a talented painter. Hatchet Man is played by Buzz Koffman.
- Bridget is the prostitute who occupies the hotel room next to Kylie's. The two meet and become friends when Kylie intervenes to bring justice to a john attempting to stiff Bridget on fees for her services. Bridget is brave and resourceful, as she proves when she aids Mike and Kylie on their big heist. Bridget is portrayed by Lea Lawrynowicz.
- Mike is an extremely skilled pickpocket, though he prefers the label "thief". He is quick-witted and courageous. He sets up the big heist when he recognizes Kylie's resemblance to Marcel's dominatrix, though he's more than a little worried when he discovers Kylie's previous connection to Marcel. Mike is played by Jeff Sinasac.
- Raven is Marcel's dominatrix and owner of the fetish dungeon Marcel frequents. She oozes sexuality but is a consummate professional who becomes all business when she perceives a threat to her establishment. Raven is played by Alexandra Elle.
- Michelle (a.k.a. The Fetish Guide) is the face of Raven's fetish dungeon. Usually cool and collected, she can become flustered when the unexpected comes into play. She is tough, and strikes out on her own at the end of Season Two. Michelle is played by Emily Schooley.
- Lex, first appearing in Season 2, is Marcel's daughter. She is twisted and sadistic, and intensely jealous of her father's affections for Raven. Lex is played by Caitlynne Medrek.
- Jordan, introduced in Season 2, is one of the forced prostitutes in Marcel's cathouse. She falls in love with Bridget, and swears vengeance on Marcel after Bridget's death. She is played by Katherine Fogler.

== Other characters ==
- The Bodyguard is Marcel's immediate protection, left to guard the entrance while Marcel is otherwise occupied with Raven. The Bodyguard takes his job seriously but is easily seduced by a pretty girl. The Bodyguard is portrayed by Rick Gomes.
- Danielle is an air-headed high school friend of Kylie's with no clue about Kylie's criminal leanings. Danielle is played by Sarah Strong.
- Emily is one of Marcel's enslaved prostitutes. Her near rape is instrumental Raven's decision to lead an insurrection against Marcel. Emily is played by Janelle Hanna, and is rumoured to have been named after Emily Schooley.
- Andrew is one of Marcel's henchman, who meets a bad end after being betrayed by Lex. Andrew is played by Neil J. Bennett.
- The Hookers with a Vengeance are the prostitutes Raven ropes into her plan. They eventually take up arms against Marcel.
- Agatha runs the cathouse on Marcel's behalf. She does her job willingly and without care for the welfare of her girls. Agatha is portrayed by Wendy Glazier.
- The Landlord is a perpetual thorn in Mike's side, constantly threatening to evict him when he's behind on the rent. He is played by Afroz Khan.
- Agent Kriss is an FBI agent who infiltrates a sex trafficking ring to try to learn more about it. She is killed by Darius after Mike and Matt arrive. Agent Kriss is played by Katya Gardner.
- Darius runs a sex trafficking ring somewhere in the southern U.S. Genteel and soft-spoken, he is nonetheless capable of murder, as he proves with Agent Kriss. He is played by Tom Konkle.
- Nicole is a young girl who falls into Darius' clutches. She manages to escape and even bravely steals a car from one of the guards, which she uses to rescue Matt and Mike. She is played by Jillian Clare.
- The Trafficker is Darius' right-hand man. He admits Matt and Mike into the trafficking house, believing them to be federal agents. He is played by Darrell Dennis.

== Episodes ==
=== Season 1 (2011) ===
No. overall	No. in season	Title	Directed by	Written by	Run time	Original release date
1	1	"Your Ex-Lover Is Dead Part 1"	Jonathan Robbins	Jonathan Robbins	7:20	June 14, 2011
Kylie returns from a night of picking pockets to discover her boyfriend, Matt, at the mercy of two thugs sent by Marcel to collect a debt.
2	2	"Your Ex-Lover Is Dead Part 2"	Jonathan Robbins	Jonathan Robbins	6:14	July 1, 2011
Kylie is forced to make a tough decision, and after dispatching the thugs, including the infamous Hatchetman, she flees to a seedy motel.
3	3	"Pick A Pocket Or Two"	Jonathan Robbins	Jonathan Robbins	8:12	July 17, 2011
Kylie has trouble sleeping because of the noise from her prostitute neighbour, Bridget, but later comes to her aid when one of Bridget's johns tries to stiff her.
4	4	"A Mentor"	Johnathan Stamp	Dave Migicovsky	9:27	December 2, 2011
Fellow pickpocket, Mike, has been watching Kylie, and corners her in an alley with a proposition - that she pose as Marcel's dominatrix to steal his money.
5	5	"Know Your Target"	Jonathan Robbins	Jonathan Robbins	9:21	September 20, 2011
Mike and Kylie solidify the plan, and Kylie infiltrates the fetish dungeon to find out more about the woman she'll be impersonating.
6	6	"Whip It"	Jonathan Robbins	Jonathan Robbins	10:31	October 15, 2011
Kylie gets a little too into the whole submission thing, when Mike decides it's time to clear the place out.
7	7	"It Always Catches Up To You"	Jonathan Robbins	Jonathan Robbins	9:15	November 15, 2011
The plan starts to go awry when Hatchet Man and Matt track Kylie and find Marcel tied up. We find out why Hatchet Man has an axe to grind with Marcel.
8	8	"Balance Due"	Jonathan Robbins	Jonathan Robbins	8:34	November 30, 2011
Bridget seduces Marcel's bodyguard until the bodyguard realizes something's up. Mike comes to her rescue before being rescued by her. The would-be robbers make their escape, sans money.

=== Season 2 (2012–2013) ===
No. overall	No. in season	Title	Directed by	Written by	Run time	Original release date
9	1	"Aftermath"	Jonathan Robbins	Lea Lawrynowicz	5:49	October 30, 2012
Marcel tortures Bridget into revealing Kylie's location.
10	2	"Debt Collectors"	Jonathan Robbins	Jonathan Robbins	7:37	November 6, 2012
Matt and Lex collect from a man on Marcel's behalf. Mike's landlord comes to collect. Marcel reveals to Raven that he's already collected Kylie.
11	3	"La Malinche"	Jonathan Robbins, Tobe Darton	Charles Barangan, Jonathan Robbins	8:25	November 13, 2012
Raven is confronted with the suffering of her girls, over dinner. Mike's attempt to win at poker nets him only a beating and information.
12	4	"Inamorata"	Alex Gheorghe, Lea Lawrynowicz	Lea Lawrynowicz	5:37	November 20, 2012
Bridget, already feeling the beginnings of guilt over her betrayal of Kylie, seeks solace in fellow prisoner, Jordan.
13	5	"Catsup"	Jason Leaver	Jonathan Robbins	5:58	November 28, 2012
Matt and Lex are sent on another collection, and Matt is shocked to learn the man he's here to collect from is Mike.
14	6	"Peripeteia"	Jason Leaver, Isaac Rayment, Alex Gheorghe, Lea Lawrynowicz	Jonathan Robbins, Lea Lawrynowicz	10:19	December 18, 2012
Marcel turns the dominatrix table on Raven. Bridget copes with her guilt in the only way she can.
15	7	"Living in Fear"	Alex Gheorghe	Alex Gheorghe	10:52	May 8, 2012
After the attempted rape of Emily by one of Marcel's goons, Raven realizes she can no longer stand idly by.
16	8	"Digging Your Own Grave"	Jason Leaver, Jonathan Robbins	Matthew Carvery	8:53	May 15, 2013
Following Lex's "confession", Marcel drags Matt out into the woods to dig a grave. Jordan swears vengeance on Marcel for Bridget's death and recruits Raven to the cause.
17	9	"Unlikely Allies"	Jonathan Robbins	Matthew Carvery, Jeff Sinasac	7:33	May 21, 2013
Jordan and Raven visit Mike in search of guns. Matt visits Mike with the information that Kylie is still alive.
18	10	"Traffick Jam"	Jason Leaver, Dylan Pouliot, Jonathan Robbins	Charles Barangan, Jeff Sinasac	9:16	May 27, 2013
During an attempted sex-trafficking, Raven and her girls, armed and accompanied by Mike, stage a rebellion. Mike and Matt leap into an escaping van.
19	11	"The Lucky Ones"	Jonathan Robbins	Jonathan Robbins	13:51	May 27, 2013
Mike and Matt infiltrate a sex-trafficking hub run by Darius, escaping only with the help of Agent Kriss and young kidnap victim, Nicole.

== Awards ==
=== Nominated ===
- 2011 Indie Intertube Awards - Best Cinematography
- 2011 Indie Intertube Awards - Best Action Series
- 2011 Digital Launch Pad - Finalist
- 2012 Marseilles Webfest - Official Selection
- 2012 International Television Festival - Best Drama
- 2013 3rd Annual Streamy Awards - Best Sci-fi/Action Series
- 2013 4th Annual Indie Soap Awards - Best Guest Appearance
- 2013 Canadian Cinema Editors Award - Best Editing in a Live Action Web Series
- 2013 Raindance Film Festival - Official Selection
- 2013 Hollyweb Festival - Official Selection
- 2014 IAWTV Awards - Best Original Score
- 2014 IAWTV Awards - Best Ensemble Cast
- 2014 Indie Series Awards - Best Composer
- 2014 Indie Series Awards - Best Visual Effects
- 2014 Hollyweb Festival - Official Selection

=== Won ===
- Grand Jury Prize - 2012 L.A. Webfest
- Outstanding Cinematography in a Dramatic Series - 2012 L.A. Webfest
- Outstanding Directing in a Dramatic Series - 2012 L.A. Webfest
- Outstanding Dramatic Series - 2012 L.A. Webfest
- Outstanding Editing in a Dramatic Series - 2012 L.A. Webfest
- Outstanding Lead Actress in a Dramatic Series - 2012 L.A. Webfest
- Outstanding Visual Effects in a Dramatic Series - 2012 L.A. Webfest
- Outstanding Writing in a Dramatic Series - 2012 L.A. Webfest
- Honoree - 16th Annual Webby Awards
- Award of Distinction in Video - 18th Annual Communicator Awards
- Award of Merit for Episode 8 - 2012 Best Shorts Competition
- Award of Merit for Leading Actress - 2012 Indiefest
- Award of Excellence - 2012 Indiefest
- Silver Award for Drama Series - 2012 W3 Awards
- Silver Award for Writing - 2012 W3 Awards
- Best International Series - 2013 IFQ Festival
- Outstanding Directing in a Dramatic Series - 2013 L.A. Webfest
- Outstanding Writing in a Dramatic Series - 2013 L.A. Webfest
- Award of Excellence for Movie or Television Website - 19th Annual Communicator Awards
- Best Suspense/Thriller - 2013 Atlanta Webfest
- Best Television or Web Series - 2013 Pollygrind Film Festival
- Outstanding Actor in a Dramatic Series - 2014 L.A. Webfest
- Outstanding Composer in a Dramatic Series - 2014 L.A. Webfest
- Outstanding Writing in a Dramatic Series - 2014 L.A. Webfest
- Best Director (Drama) - 2014 Indie Series Awards
- Best Supporting Actress (Drama) - 2014 Indie Series Awards
- Gold Award for Drama Series - 2014 Communicator Awards
- Best Action/Adventure Series - 2014 Miami Webfest
