= Out with Dad (web series) =

- Logo
- Genre: Drama
- Created by: Jason Leaver
- Written by: Jason Leaver
- Directed by: Jason Leaver
- Starring: Kate Conway; Will Conlon; Lindsey Middleton; Corey Lof; Caitlynne Medrek; Laura Jabalee; Kelly-Marie Murtha; Darryl Dinn; Wendy Glazier; Jonathan Robbins
- Theme music composer: Adrian Ellis
- Country of origin: Canada
- Original language: English
- No. of seasons: 5
- No. of episodes: 82

Production
- Producers: Jason Leaver; Eric Taylor; Kara Dymond; Rebecca Rynsoever
- Production location: Toronto
- Cinematography: Jason Leaver; Bruce Willian Harper
- Editor: Jason Leaver
- Running time: 3-15 minutes
- Production company: JLeaver Presentations

Original release
- Release: July 7, 2010 – November 15, 2017

Out with Dad is a Canadian web series created, written, directed, and produced by Jason Leaver. The series premiered on YouTube in 2010, and ran for five seasons, concluding in 2017. It follows Rose, a lesbian teenager, who struggles through the process of her coming out to her single father.

The series has won various awards, including several Indie Series Awards, and has screened at numerous festivals, including the Los Angeles Web Series Festival. As of April 2018, the series has over 40,000 subscribers and has been viewed over 25 million times on YouTube.

== Background ==
The series premiered on YouTube in 2010 and is filmed in and around Toronto, Ontario, Canada. It also streams on Blip and Dailymotion. The series shines a spotlight on the challenges of people in the LGBT community, specifically lesbians facing homophobia.

In 2011, the series was given an official endorsement by PFLAG Canada.

Since the conclusion of its third season, the series has been funded solely by fans through the online funding platform Patreon. In 2017, the fifth season, which consists of 5 episodes, was announced as the final season of the series.

=== Subtitles ===
Fans of the series take upon it themselves to publish subtitles for the episodes on YouTube in many different languages, including:

- Germanic languages : English, Dutch, German
- Latine languages : French, Portuguese, Spanish, Italian
- Eastern European languages : Czech
- Partially subtitled in those languages : Russian (Seasons 1 & 2), Greek (Seasons 1 & 3) and Croatian (Seasons 1 & 3)

A deal with France Televisions led to the dubbing in French of the webseries, by its subsidiary MFP, for the broadcasting on France 4 channel of the episodes 1.01 to 3.06.

== Episodes ==
See List of episodes of Out with Dad

== Cast ==
See Out with Dad cast members
