= Caitlynne Medrek =

Canadian actress

- Born: November 19, 1989 (age 36); Calgary, Alberta, Canada
- Occupation: Actress
- Years active: 2001–present
- Spouse: Jordan Charette

Caitlynne Medrek (born November 19, 1989) is a Canadian actress. She spent the first half of her career working in professional theatre throughout Canada, but has since expanded it to film and television.

A Canadian College of Performing Arts alumna, Medrek is best known for her roles in Seasons 15 and 16 of Heartland as Ms. Clarissa and Season 3 of Fargo as Grace Stussy. She has also had a voice acting career with notable roles like Dawn in Total Drama: Revenge of the Island, Mikoto in My-HiME, Miu Matsuoka in Strawberry Marshmallow, and Pan in Dragon Ball GT. Her latest mainstream voice work includes The Haunted House: The Secret of the Ghost Ball, Kongsuni and Friends, Cardfight!! Vanguard, Arthur, and Gintama. She can be seen in the final season of Hell on Wheels, Season 2 of Wynonna Earp, Season 3 of Fargo as Grace Stussy, Season 3 of The Detour and recently, Season 2 of Tribal and Season 2 of Yellowjackets. Medrek starred in two feature films in 2022. Hailey Rose was released in 2023 at the Calgary International Film Festival to much acclaim. Medrek played "Rose" and was ultimately nominated for an Ampia Award for Best Performance-Female or Non-Binary, and then by Actra Alberta for Best Supporting Performance. Hailey Rose can be found on most streaming platforms. The second feature film, Stage 5 was directed by Australian director, Eddie Arya, and is awaiting its Canadian release.

Medrek is also known in the world of web series for playing Claire Daniels, one of the main characters in the LGBTQ webseries, Out with Dad, for which she received nominations and awards.

== Early life ==
Medrek was born on November 19, 1989, in Calgary, Alberta to Cynthia (née Harrison) and Adam Medrek. She is of Polish and Ukrainian descent. Medrek started performing at 10 doing community theatre, and quickly moved into the professional theatre world at 12. She took up dance in a variety of styles including Ukrainian dance and competed at various festivals throughout the province in solo, duet, and trio events. She was a member of the Young Canadians of the Calgary Stampede and at age 15 competing in Calgary's "Youth Talent Showdown" competition at the Calgary Stampede where she won 2nd runner-up. That same year she placed first at the Kiwanis Music Festival and went on to win first place in Provincials for Musical Theatre in Edmonton.

== Career ==
In 2006, she was cast as Amber in the Rod Lurie-directed film Resurrecting the Champ. Medrek has voiced characters in a variety of anime works, often with the Calgary-based Blue Water Studios and Ocean Productions. In the summer of 2007, she was a member of the Charlottetown Festival Young Company Training Program and a cast member of Alberta Fusion. She graduated in April 2008 from the Canadian College of Performing Arts (CCPA), where she received the Arnold Spohr Scholarship. After graduating college, she worked regional theatre contracts until she decided to move to Toronto, Ontario.

In December 2008, she was seen in Saskatoon-based Persephone Theatre's A Christmas Carol as 'Want'. In July 2009, Medrek performed with Globus Theatre, in Bobcaygeon, Ontario, playing the lead in Neil Simon's I Ought To Be in Pictures, and later that year appearing in the title role in Canada's debut of the off-Broadway show Pinkalicious the Musical. Medrek performed the role for two years.

In January 2010, she starred as Anne Frank in The Diary of Anne Frank, and completed the run of "The 25th Annual Putnam County Spelling Bee" as "Logainne Schwarzy" with Fallen Rock Productions, in the spring. In the summer she went on to play Charlie Brown's sister, Sally, in "Dog Sees God". While maintaining her theatre career, Medrek had been cast as a regular in the animated television series Total Drama: Revenge of the Island as Dawn, broadcast on Fresh TV and Teletoon, as a guest in the animated television series Skatoony, the web series Out With Dad and the second season of Clutch. In 2013 she starred in Blood Riders: the Devil Rides with Us which premiered at the Blood in the Snow Film Festival in Toronto, Ontario.

Medrek decided to move back to Alberta in 2014 to seek out future theatre and film opportunities in her home Province. In the fall of 2014, she was cast as Hope in Urinetown, Kensington in Becky's New Car, Violet Beauregard in Willy Wonka and the Chocolate Factory, "Betty Parris" in Theatre Calgary's The Crucible, Belle in Disenchanted, and Gertrude McFuzz in Seussical, the Musical. Medrek had also taken an interest in directing and assistant-directed Hana's Suitcase with StoryBook Theatre and made her directing debut in the fall of 2017 with Pinkalicious for StoryBook Theatre. In the summer of 2015, she was cast in Episode 10 of AMC's highly acclaimed Hell on Wheels. Since 2015, her film career has excelled further, along with more anime projects for Netflix, a role on Season 2 of Wyonna Earp, a principal role in Season 3 of The Detour, and a recurring role on Season 3 of Fargo as Grace Stussy.

In 2016, she founded YYC Princess, a Calgary-based company providing princess-themed entertainment services. She is a cast member of Dirty Laundry, Calgary's longest-running weekly improvised soap opera.

In 2019, Medrek played the role of Mrs. Wilkinson in Theatre Calgary's production of Billy Elliot the Musical. She won the Betty Mitchell Award for Best Leading Actress in a Musical for her performance.

In 2020, Medrek was named by Avenue Magazine in Calgary as one of Calgary's own "Top 40 under 40". She was also named as Broadway World's "Performer of the Decade" for her role in Theatre Calgary's production of Billy Elliot the Musical.

== Personal life ==
Medrek is married to Jordan Charette.

== Filmography ==
=== Anime series ===
- The Haunted House - Gaeun Lee
- Strawberry Marshmallow – Miu Matsuoka
- D.I.C.E. – Puffy Angel
- Doki Doki School Hours – Chinatsu Nakayama, Soccer Ball
- My-HiME – Mikoto Minagi
- My-Otome – Mikoto the Cat Goddess
- Flame of Recca – Ganko Morikawa/Primela, Young Fuuko
- Future Card Buddyfight - Ku Teito
- Gintama° - Soyo Tokugawa
- Kiznaiver - Chidori Takashiro
- Mobile Suit Zeta Gundam – Qum, Cheimin Noah
- Dragon Ball GT – Pan (Canadian dub), Young Guide
- Tomato Twins – Ti Ann
- Cardfight!! Vanguard G - Rin Hashima
- Kongsuni - Eve

=== Video games ===
- Dynasty Warriors: Gundam – Elpeo Puru
- Dynasty Warriors: Gundam 2 – Elpeo Puru
- Mega Man X: Command Mission – Cinnamon

=== Radio roles ===
- Conversations with my Neighbour's Pitbull – Ellen
- Discovery Financial – Teen Girl

=== Film and television roles ===
- Resurrecting the Champ – Amber, the babysitter (deleted scenes)
- Iota – Child Narrator, Lead
- Second Coming in the 2nd Grade – Christina
- Total Drama: Revenge of the Island - Dawn
- Out with Dad - Claire Daniels
- Clutch (web series) - Lex
- Skatoony - Dawn
- Blood Riders: the Devil Rides with Us
- Bibi Blocksberg – Theme song Vocal
- Arthur - Kaylie Lamott
- Hell on Wheels - Season 5, Episode 10
- Fargo - Season 3
- Wynonna Earp - Season 2
- The Detour - Season 3
- Heartland - Seasons 15 & 16
- Tribal - Season 2
- Hailey Rose - Rose
- Stage 5

=== Theater roles ===
- Sound of Music – Stage West – Marta Von Trapp
- A Christmas Carol – Theatre Calgary – Mary Cratchit
- Picking Up Chekhov – Alberta Theatre Projects – The Kid
- Oklahoma! – Front Row Centre – Ado Annie
- Alberta Fusion – The Confederation Centre's Young Company/Charlottetown Festival
- Oh Canada Eh! Dinner Theatre – Oh Canada Eh! – Rose Marie/ Featured Singer Dancer
- A Christmas Carol – Persephone Theatre – Want
- I Ought to Be in Pictures – Globus Theatre – Libby Tucker
- Pinkalicious, the Musical – Vital Theatre Company – Pinkalicious
- The Diary of Anne Frank – Encore Entertainment – Anne Frank
- Becky's New Car - Alberta Theatre Projects – Kensington
- The Crucible - Theatre Calgary - Betty Parris
- Disenchanted - Cappuccino Theatre - Belle
- Seussical, the Musical - Storybook Theatre - Gertrude McFuzz
- Billy Elliot the Musical - Theatre Calgary - Mrs. Wilkinson

== Awards and nominations ==
Medrek has received the following nominations and awards:

Awards	Total		2013		2014		2015	
Awards	Nominations	Awards	Nom.	Aw.	Nom.	Aw.	Nom.	Aw.
Indie Soap Awards	3	1	1	1	1	0	1	tbd
LA WebFest	---	1	Sel.	---	Sel.	1	---	---

=== 2013 ===
4th Indie Soap Awards (2013) (1 only winner in a category)

- Award : Best Breakthrough Performance for " Out with Dad "

=== 2014 ===
5th Indie Soap Awards (2014) (1 only winner in a category)

- Nominations: Best Supporting Actress (Drama) for " Out with Dad " (1st nom.)

LA Web Series Festival 2014 (multiple prizes in the same category)

- Award : Outstanding Supporting Actress in a Drama Series for " Out with Dad "

=== 2015 ===
6th Indie Soap Awards (2015) (1 only winner in a category)

- Nominations: Best Supporting Actress (Drama) for " Out with Dad " (2nd nom.)

=== 2020 ===
Top 40 Under 40

=== 2021 ===
Broadway World - Regional Awards (2021)(1 only winner in a category)

- Award: Performer of the Decade (Musical or Comedy) for " Billy Elliot "
