= Blip.tv =

American media platform for web series

Blip Networks, Inc.
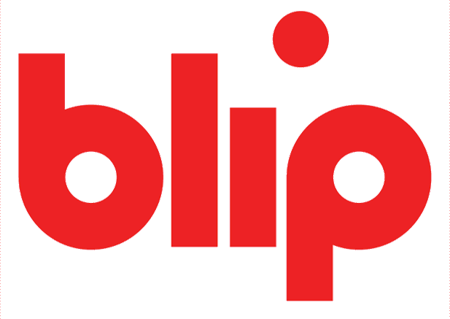
- Formerly: blip.tv (2005–2011)
- Type: Subsidiary
- Founded: May 5, 2005
- Defunct: August 20, 2015
- Fate: Dissolved
- Headquarters: New York City, New York, U.S.
- Area served: Worldwide
- Parent: Maker Studios (2013–2015)

Blip (formerly blip.tv) was an American media platform for web series content and also offered a dashboard for producers of original web series to distribute and monetize their productions. The company was founded on May 5, 2005, and it was located in New York City (where the headquarters was located) and Los Angeles. It was financed by Bain Capital Ventures, Canaan Partners, and Ambient Sound Investments. Blip's mission statement was "to deliver the best original web series to audiences across multiple platforms." The site showcased a wide variety of dramas, comedies, arts, sports and other shows.

== History ==
Founded on May 5, 2005, by Mike Hudack, Dina Kaplan, Justin Day, Jared Klett, and Charles Hope, blip.tv was bootstrap funded by its founders for the first year of its operation. The partners created blip.tv shortly after they joined Yahoo's video blogging group, and saw an opportunity to create a video-hosting site that focused on being "a best–in-class video hosting, distribution and monetization platform for independent producers of quality video content." The group acquired the blip.tv domain, created the site's original interface in a week's time then began attracting producers and viewers who were interested in niche video content, such as the web series, for which the site has since become known. The founders hired their first employee, Eric Mortensen, in 2006 to head up content and programming, making their first explicit move toward becoming a media company.

In 2007, blip.tv secured funding from Ambient Sound Investments and in 2008 received additional support from Bain Capital. In 2008, Oscar-winning documentary filmmaker Michael Moore teamed up with Blip, alongside Brave New Films, to distribute his movie Slacker Uprising, which was the first time a notable director released a free, feature-length film via the Internet.

In 2009, blip.tv's distribution network grew significantly with the addition of new partnerships with YouTube, Vimeo, NBC Local Media New York and Roku. In 2010, blip.tv surpassed 100 million video views. The following year, after reaching over three billion cumulative video views, the site underwent a massive overhaul. The company rolled out a new logo and name, dropping the ".TV" and becoming "Blip." Along with the redesign came a change in business policy, and instead of acting mainly as a video distributor, Blip then "[embraced] its destiny as a video destination with a redesign that put the most popular blip.tv web series front and center."

Following the departure of many of the site's founders, Kelly Day, who had previously worked for Discovery Communications, was brought in as the company's new CEO in 2012. Day brought on Max Smith, previously CFO of Talking Media Group, as the new Chief Financial Officer and Jason Krebs, formerly Tremor Video's chief media officer, as the new president of sales and marketing.

In 2012, Blip announced the launch of Blip Studios headed by Steve Woolf, whereby the company works directly with brands, talent and independent producers of web video to create higher-quality content. For example, The Gauntlet, a video-game competition series, was made in partnership with Blip Studios and Rooster Teeth productions. Blip also has partnered with Yahoo whereby "Yahoo will promote 13 shows that Blip has distribution rights to on Yahoo Screen. Blip will distribute 16 Yahoo video series... on its destination site Blip.tv."

As of 2013, Blip Studios also had exclusive talent and distribution agreements with Channel Awesome, Juliansmith.tv, My Damn Channel, and others. Blip Studios content had cumulatively received more than 250,000,000 views. In the same year, Blip announced its intention to host content created by Ray William Johnson, The Dark Knight Rises producer Michael Uslan, and Fremantle Media North America, producer of American Idol and The Pet Collective.

On August 21, 2013, Blip.tv was acquired by Maker Studios. The executive team of Blip.tv was included in the acquisition.

After the acquisition, some user agreement terms were changed, including new requirements that content must be demonstrated to be part of a series and of high quality. Facebook commenting was added around the same time.

In May 2014, users have first reported receiving a notification by Blip.TV that they would lose uploading abilities in July 2014, and that their channel would be closed in September that year. No policy violations were cited in the messages, which suggested an economical cause.

Maker Studios shut down Blip.tv on August 20, 2015. The shutdown was first announced one month in advance. The website is now inactive.

Shortly thereafter, Maker Studios shut down to make way for Disney Digital Network.

== Market and business model ==
With a focus on serial web show programming to the exclusion of other types of online video, "the Blip.tv formula purposefully does not emulate the YouTube viral video sharing and friends and family video hosting model," according to ZDNet writer Donna Bogatin. All revenue from advertising was split 50/50 between content producers and Blip.

Since the site's launch in 2005, Blip had amassed over of 2,500-plus independent producers and collaborated with more than 300 blue chip advertisers and 26 of the top 50 advertisers in the US, including GM, P&G, Microsoft, Google, Geico, and more. Blip also enabled advertising partners to delivered fully customizable video advertising, including interactive pre-rolls and video overlays.

== Popularity ==
In 2012, according to figures from ComScore and Quantcast, Blip had around 500 million global monthly views, and 40 million unique monthly viewers. For comparison, YouTube receives over 1 billion global views per month. The average viewer spent about 80 minutes on the site each month and the average viewing session on the site was about 25 minutes.

== Notable content ==
=== RedLetterMedia ===
Independent film and media production company RedLetterMedia hosted much of its early long-form content on Blip, including the first seasons of its review series Half in the Bag. The platform allowed the group to release feature-length video essays such as the 70-minute Star Wars: Episode I – The Phantom Menace review at a time when YouTube imposed strict length limits. Episodes often premiered on Blip before later appearing on YouTube.

=== Channel Awesome ===
Online media production company Channel Awesome began distributing its content on Blip in 2008. Over the years, notable Channel Awesome review-series have included The Nostalgia Critic, The Cinema Snob, and Atop the Fourth Wall. The Nostalgia Critic videos themselves average over 100,000 to 200,000 views a week. In October 2012, Blip announced a partnership with Channel Awesome and the creation of a new review channel on YouTube, The League of Super Critics. The channel consists of well known web personalities including Nostalgia Critic, Nostalgia Chick, The Cinema Snob and Todd in the Shadows. The shows cover a variety of topics including television, books, films and music.

=== Rooster Teeth ===
Blip also had a partnership with Rooster Teeth, the producers of The Gauntlet, Red vs. Blue, Immersion, and Achievement Hunter. Red vs. Blue has received much critical acclaim and won the award "Best Animated Web Series" from the International Academy of Web Television.

=== Kipkay ===
Blip used to have KipKay's DIY channel on the site. KipKay still makes content and uploads it to YouTube.

=== Other content ===
Blip had been amassing exclusive comedy programming. Through its partnership with My Damn Channel, the sixth season of David Wain's Wainy Days web-series will air exclusively on Blip. Blip also hosts other My Damn Channel content including Daddy Knows Best, which stars Stephen Rannazzisi as a deadbeat dad, and video blog series Daily Grace. Blip also had partnerships with online comedians Julian Smith and Ray William Johnson.

After being one of the dozens of channels that were part of YouTube's $100 million original channel initiative, FremantleMedia dropped its partnership with YouTube in favor of working with Blip on the production of The Pet Collective, which showcases short clips of animals. Although the videos have continued to be distributed on YouTube, Blip had a first-run distribution window and acted as exclusive ad-sales agent for The Pet Collective.

== Video features ==
Viewing Blip videos on a PC or laptop required the Adobe Flash Player plug-in to be installed on the browser; mobile viewing was available through a mobile app that was available until early 2014 and functional until August 2015, along with an HTML5 flag on mobile browsers which allowed viewing of videos uploaded in H.264 formats. File size was limited to 1GB for uploads on the Blip site and the player was Flash-based. The video quality on Blip was optimized using the H.264 video codec and AAC audio codec using a high quality profile. On the site, each show page was encouraged to have a show poster, header graphic and website banner.

Blip's policy was to block access or remove material that it believed in good faith to be copyrighted material illegally distributed or content which went beyond reasonable fair use guidelines.

== See also ==
- Comparison of video services
