= PFLAG Canada =

PFLAG National
- Founded: 1970s, Toronto
- Purpose: LGBTQ activism
- Region served: Canada
- Method: Campaigning, Advocacy, Support groups, Public speaking, education
- Website: www.pflagcanada.ca

PFLAG Canada is a national non-profit organization which brings together family and friends of LGBTQ people in Canada. It was begun separately and without knowledge of the American PFLAG which performs the same functions in the United States. As of November 2014 PFLAG Canada has over 70 chapters and/or contacts in nine Canadian provinces. The board of directors is responsible for six regions across Canada, and includes a president, vice-president, secretary, and treasurer among others.

== History ==
In Toronto in the 1970s, meetings of non-LGBT but welcoming family members were held under the banner of Parents Of Gays (POG). Changes were accelerated by Rev. Brent Hawkes of the Metropolitan Community Church of Toronto, who brought Betty Fairchild, co-author of Now That You Know, to POG meetings. After POG was advertised in Chatelaine, Anne Rutledge of Mississauga contacted June Tattle (a friend of Fairchild and parent of a gay child), after which POG was amalgamated with Families and Friends of Lesbians and Gays (FFLAG), started by Pauline Martin and her son Russell in October 1981. The new organization was re-styled as Parents and Friends of Lesbians and Gays, or Parents FLAG.

After a number of media appearances by Rutledge and other members of Parents FLAG, other chapters were established throughout Canada in the 1980s and 1990s. Finally, in 2003, the movement was nationally consolidated as PFLAG Canada, renamed so as to distinguish the organization from the American NGO of a similar name. It was consolidated as a federal corporation in 2005, and all chapters were renamed as PFLAG Canada to reflect the changes.

== Endorsements ==
PFLAG Canada officially endorses the web series Out With Dad.

== Partnerships ==
PFLAG Canada has had a number of partnerships, the most noteworthy being with FCB Toronto when the PSA "Nobody's Memories" aired across Canada and North America.

== See also ==
- Tehila (Israel)
- Families and Friends of Lesbians and Gays (United Kingdom)
- COLAGE
- Family Pride Canada
- Brenda Howard Memorial Award
