= Jillian Clare =

American actress and singer (born 1992)

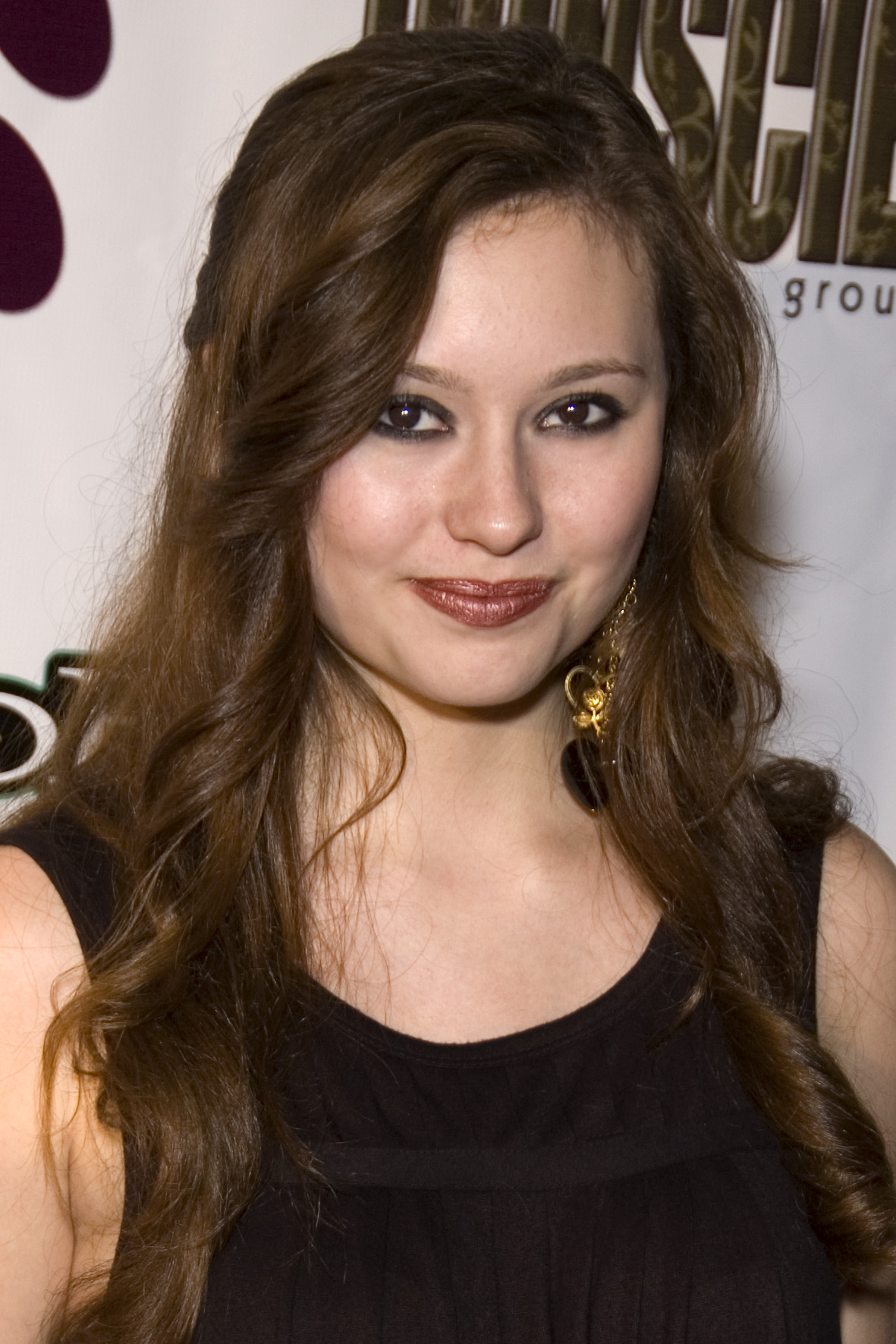
- Clare attending the "Cuties for Canines" charity event, West Los Angeles, CA on November 16, 2007
- Born: July 25, 1992 (age 34); Portland, Oregon, U.S.
- Occupations: Actress; singer
- Years active: 2001–present
- Website: jillianclare.com

Jillian Clare (born July 25, 1992) is an American actress and singer. She is best known for her role as pre-teen Abigail "Abby" Deveraux on Days of Our Lives, Hayley on Victorious, and her lead role as Lindsey Lou in the film Pretty Broken.

== Life and career ==
Clare was born in Portland, Oregon. She began a stage career on singing. One year later, she starred in A Dream is a Wish, a one-person original stage musical. Afterwards, she starred in several TV commercials.

In the summer of 2000, Clare moved to Los Angeles, and began appearing in film and television roles. In 2002 she had two roles in major movies including Sam Raimi's Spider-Man and a role as the voice of a little girl in Steven Spielberg's Catch Me if You Can. In 2004, she received a position as a host on the children's news-magazine show All Access Pass. She acted in, executive-produced, and co-wrote the theme song for the live action comedy pilot L.A.F.I.T., in 2005.

Her singing has appeared on the Soap Sessions 8 Christmas CD, the Hollywood Hooligans Christmas CD, and a number of CDs for children. Clare also has performed for many charitable causes, mostly for the protection of animals.

Jillian Clare has appeared on both the big and small screen in numerous projects including her double award-winning portrayal of pre-teen Abby Deveraux on NBC's Days of Our Lives and guest appearances on ABC's Castle and Suburgatory, etc. Her most well-known character on the silver screen was in the Nickelodeon sitcom Victorious in the two-parter "Freak the Freak Out" as Haley Ferguson, a rival to Tori Vega (played by Victoria Justice).

Recent films include starring roles in The Kitchen, alongside Bryan Greenberg and Laura Prepon, plus the recently released faith-based holiday feature, By God's Grace. Miss Clare also stars in Alien Abduction by famed producers Lawrence Bender and Mike Fleiss for IFC – their highest-grossing film to date.

No stranger to the stage either, Clare's background includes lead roles in musicals, original pieces, and iconic plays. Fall 2014 brought another dimension to Jillian's theater experience as she starred in Delusion: Lies Within – the pioneer production of horror theater produced by the Tony Award Winning team, Glendell Entertainment. Jillian also starred in the 2016 production of Delusion: His Crimson Queen.

In early 2010, Miss Clare joined the ranks of New Media and began producing and starring in the multi-award-winning teen series Miss Behave, which also featured other Days of Our Lives performers Darin Brooks, Patrika Darbo and Eric Martsolf. She expanded her web experience to the north starring in the Season Two finale of the award-winning Canadian female fatale series, Clutch, which earned her the title of Best Supporting Actress in a Drama at the 2014 Indie Series Awards. Jillian currently stars in Acting Dead, a dark comedy about Hollywood and Zombies. The show is the first independent series to win a Primetime Emmy. Jillian also made a special guest appearance on Fame Dogs – a new mini-digital series that has been winning several awards in the community.

Fall 2015 marked a new adventure as Miss Clare produced her first short film, Advent, which she is also starred in. Advent will be the first in a series of short and feature films that Jillian plans to produce under her production company, Whimsical Entertainment. The film was a Finalist at the 2016 USA Film Festival Short Film Competition and an Official Selection at the 2016 Great Lakes International Film Festival.

In April 2016, Jillian was cast in Ladies of The Lake which tells the story of four wealthy wives living in the exclusive gated community of Avalon. When their abusive husbands begin to turn up dead, Detective Shawn Daniels launches an investigation, only to discover the many secrets hidden beneath the glossy veneers of Avalon. Jillian plays Cassidy Montgomery, the Queen Bee of the Ladies of the Lake children. The mini-series is a live action version of the novel of the same name written by Ken Corday (Days of Our Lives, executive producer). The show lasted two seasons.

Jillian stars in Pretty Broken (formerly Free For All), in which she also produced. The film was shot in Clare's hometown of Portland, OR and made its world premiere at The Newport Beach Film Festival. The film was released in 2019.

Most recently, Jillian stepped behind the camera for her directorial debut on the feature film To The Beat!. The film follows 14 year old twin sisters who enter a contest to be dancers in their favorite pop stars music video, which leads to a battle with their rival, across the street who wants to win the contest as well. The film was released on DVD and VOD March 13, 2018. Clare returned behind the camera to direct the sequel to To The Beat!, To The Beat! Back 2 School. The film was released right before the COVID-19 pandemic hit the United States.

In addition to her career, Jillian is an outspoken environmentalist and activist. She has been the Ambassador for several causes over the course of her career, including Ape Action, St. Baldrick's Foundation, Starlight Children's Foundation, and several other animal-centric charities.

== Filmography ==
=== Film ===
| Year | Title | Role | Notes |
|---|---|---|---|
| 2002 | Spider-Man | Crying Girl in Tram | Feature Film |
| 2002 | Catch Me If You Can | Little Girl | Voice role |
| 2002 | While Supplies Last | Cathy Morrison | Feature Film |
| 2002 | Maggie and Annie | Debbie | Feature Film |
| 2003 | Quigley | Megan Channing | Feature Film |
| 2003 | Graduation Night | Clio | Feature Film |
| 2003 | Wishing Time | Young Maggie | Short Time |
| 2004 | Chasing Daylight | Amber | Short Film |
| 2006 | Against Type | Megan Stack | Television film |
| 2012 | The Kitchen | Nikki | Feature Film |
| 2014 | The Roommate | Stephanie | Short film |
| 2014 | Alien Abduction | Jillian Morris | Feature Film |
| 2014 | By God's Grace | Samantha Tipton | Feature Film |
| 2016 | Fame Dogs | Jordan Johanssen | Feature Film |
| 2016 | Advent | Peach | Short film |
| 2018 | To The Beat! | Director | Feature Film |
| 2019 | Pretty Broken | Lindsey Lou | Feature Film |
| 2020 | To The Beat! Back 2 School | Ruby, Director | Feature Film |
| 2021 | Vinyl Child | Velvet | Short film |

=== Television ===
| Year | Title | Role | Notes |
|---|---|---|---|
| 2003–04 | Days of Our Lives | Abigail "Abby" Deveraux | 33 episodes |
| 2007 | The Winner | Young Alison | 1 episode |
| 2010–12 | Miss Behave | Victoria "Tori" Archer | 25 episodes |
| 2010 | Victorious | Hayley Ferguson | 1 episode |
| 2010 | Castle | Gracie | 1 episode |
| 2011 | It's a Cardboard Life | Mercedes | 1 episode |
| 2011 | ACME Hollywood Dream Role | Herself | 1 episode |
| 2011 | Hero Treatment | Cyberella | 1 episode |
| 2012 | Suburgatory | Waitress | 1 episode |
| 2013 | Clutch | Nicole | 1 episode |
| 2014 | Acting Dead | Alex Carbonneux | 8 episodes |
| 2016 | Ladies of the Lake | Cassidy Montgomery | Mini-series |

== Awards and nominations ==
Clare has been nominated for five Young Artist Awards, in 2003, 2004, and 2005. She won twice, for Best Performance in a TV Series - Recurring Young Actress for her role in Days of our Lives, in both 2004 and 2005. Her other nominations were for Best Performance in a Commercial, for Children's Tylenol, in 2003; Best Performance in a Feature Film - Young Actress Age Ten or Younger, for Quigley, in 2004; and Best Performance in a Short Film, for "Chasing Daylight", in 2005.

For her singing, she has received several vocal talent awards. In 2014, Clare took home the Jury Award at the Austin Indie Flix Showcase for Best Actress for her portrayal of Alex in Acting Dead. Clare has been nominated several times at the Indie Series Awards. She was nominated three times for Best Lead Actress in a Drama for her series, Miss Behave in 2011–2013. In 2014, she won Best Supporting Actress in A Drama for her role as Nicole in the Canadian drama Clutch. Clare has been nominated twice at the awards for her comedic performances; Best Lead Actress in A Comedy for Acting Dead in 2015, and Best Guest Actress in A Comedy in 2017 for her role in Fame Dogs.
