= Jason Leaver =

Canadian video director

Jason Leaver is a Canadian web series creator, known as the creator of the LGBT web series Out with Dad.

== Career ==
=== Out with Dad ===
Out with Dad was released in 2010 and is filmed in and around Toronto, Ontario, Canada. The series follows the trials and tribulations of a teenage lesbian named Rose and the process of her coming out to her single father. It has won various awards, including several Indie Series Awards, and has screened at numerous festivals, including the Los Angeles Web Series Festival. As of April 2018, the series has over 40,000 subscribers and has been viewed over 25 million times on YouTube.

It currently streams on several online platforms, including Blip, Dailymotion and YouTube. The series shines a spotlight on the challenges of people in the LGBT community, specifically lesbians facing homophobia. In 2011, the series was given an official endorsement by PFLAG Canada.

Since the conclusion of its third season, the series has been funded solely by fans through the online funding platform Patreon. The fifth season, which consists of 5 episodes, was announced as the final season of the series in 2017.
