= Kate Conway =

Canadian actress and producer

- Born: June 17, 1986 (age 39); Mississauga, Ontario, Canada
- Occupations: Actress, producer
- Years active: 2010–present

Kate Conway (born June 17, 1986) is a Canadian actress and producer. She is best known as the star of the web series Out With Dad.

== Career ==
Conway was cast in Out With Dad in 2010, and has starred on the series since then. For her performance, she has been nominated for various awards, winning several, including two Indie Series Awards and two awards at the Los Angeles Web Series Festival. At the 2014 Streamy Awards, Conway was nominated for the Best Actress in a Drama Series award for her performance in Out With Dad, but lost to Ashley Clements for The Lizzie Bennet Diaries.

Conway is also the star and producer of her own web series on YouTube titled #KateConwayisaJerk, which is directed and edited by Out With Dad creator Jason Leaver.

== Personal life ==
Although she is known for her role as a lesbian in Out With Dad, Conway identifies as straight.
