= South Branch Park =

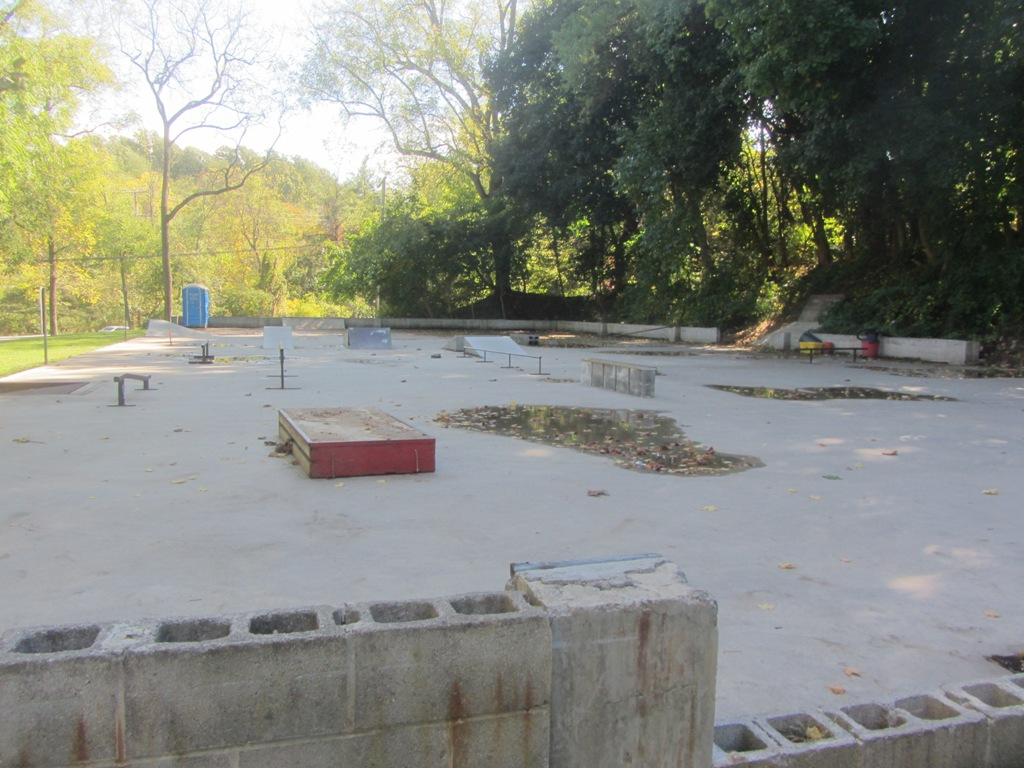
- South Branch Skate Park

- Location within Maryland
- 39°21′44″N 76°58′09″W
- Location: Sykesville, Maryland

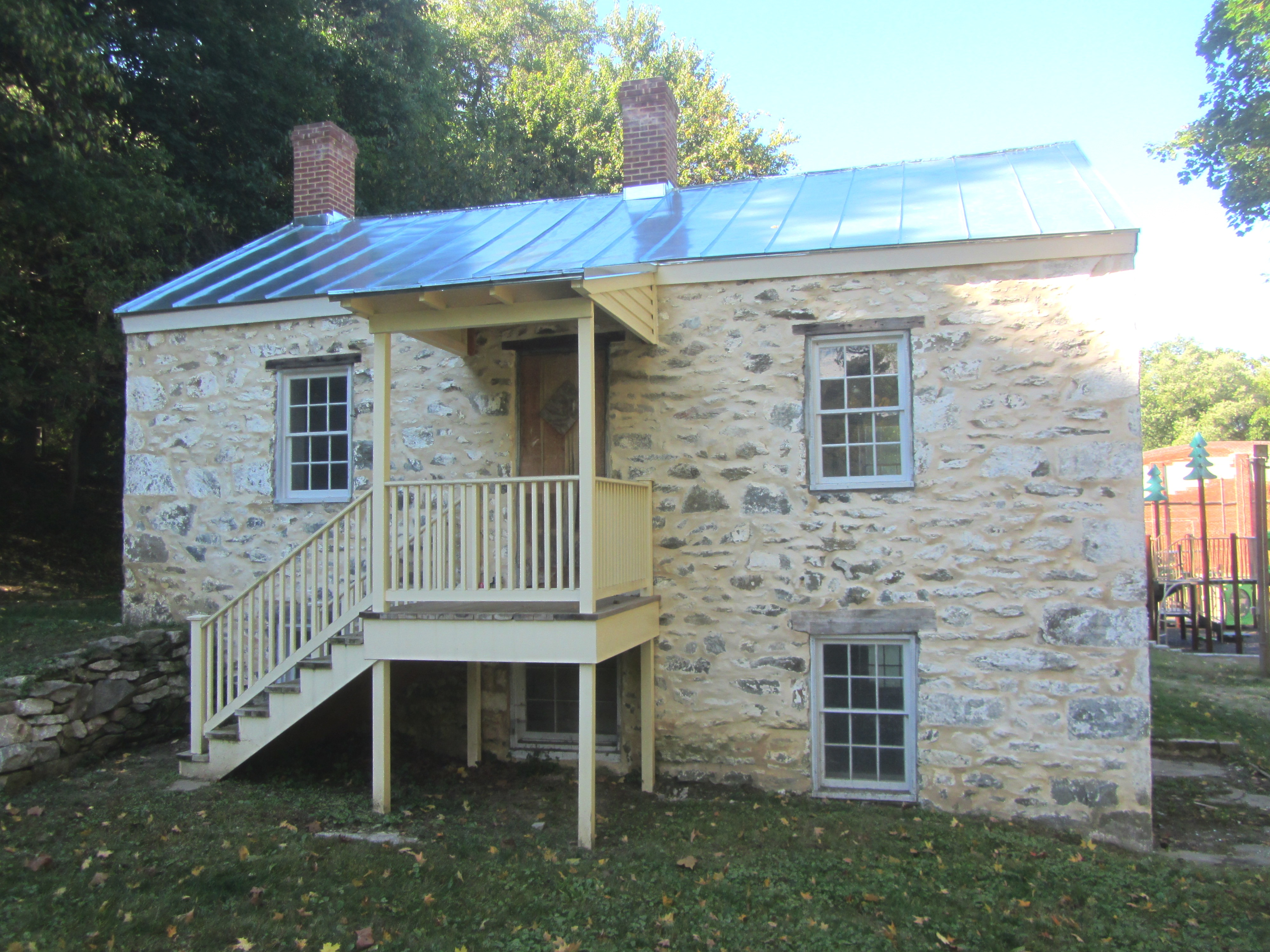
19th century Sykesville Stone House. $110,000 renovation included having a front porch replaced with new smaller unit with steps on opposite side. Side additions removed.

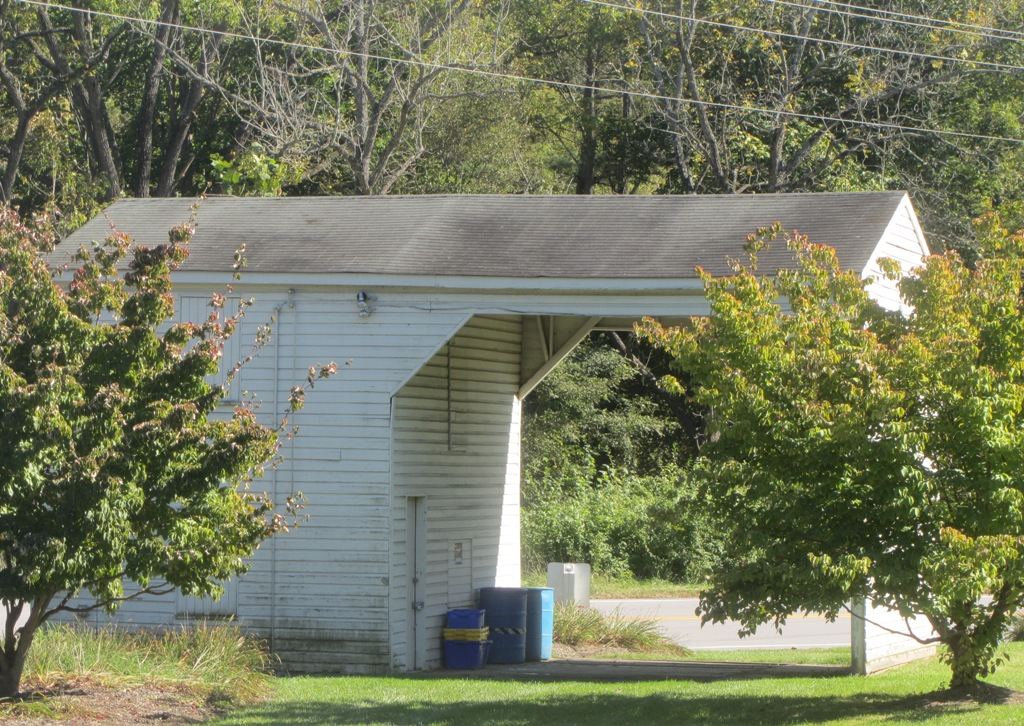
Sykesville Scales circa 1930

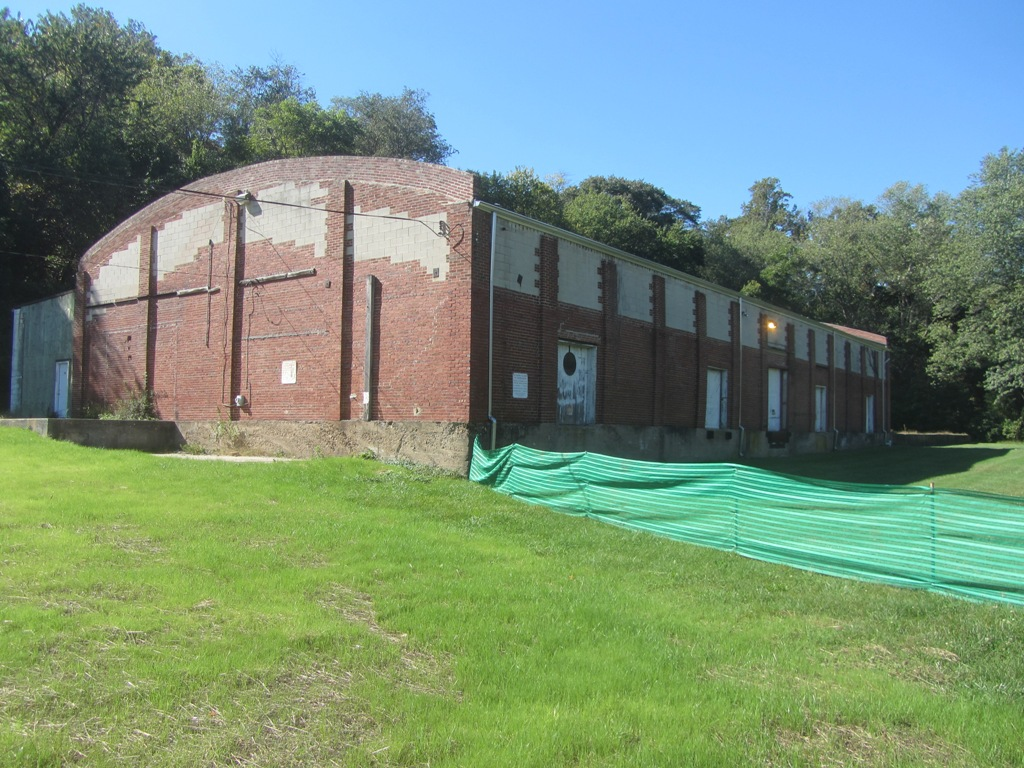
1917 B.F. Shriver Warehouse

South Branch Park is a historic industrial site located at Sykesville, Howard County, Maryland, United States.

The site is the location of the James Sykes Mill for which Sykesville is named, an 1870 Stone House, as well as the 1917 B.F. Shriver Canning Factory and Howard Cotton Factory. James Skykes defended his homeland serving in the War of 1812.

The Sykesville mill was constructed of granite with waterwheel power, and operated as the Mechant's Flour Mill. It burned once and was rebuilt by Skyes as a cotton mill. It was used by Governor Frank Brown as a storehouse in the late 1800s when the mill was out of service. A 1905 fire destroyed the mill, with $12,000 in damages paid to Brown in insurance.

In 1996, Howard County purchased 7.6 acres of historic industrial land from Tisano Reality with State Open Space Funds for the creation of South Branch Park. In 2011, Howard County leased the land back to the town of Sykesville for $817,583 and requested $617,000 from the town to help complete restoration of the buildings and site construction capital costs.

In 2011, another $256,000 state grant was awarded to implement a park at the historic site including restoration of a caboose. Matching county funds were anticipated, but not provided. Updated plans included a skate park, parking lot, stormwater pond, and reroofing of the B.F Shriver Canning Company "Apple Butter Factory" is scheduled at an undetermined date for phase II. Phase III plans to restore the factory.

On September 6, County Executive Ken Ulman and candidate Courtney Watson opened phase I of the South Branch Park which included a new playground and the dismantling of a historic water tower as part of a series of pre-election groundbreakings for partially funded projects around the county including the Regional Transportation Agency of Central Maryland terminal. The $269,000 project was funded by Program Open Space.

In response to local residents constructing their own skatepark features while waiting for promised improvements, Howard County conducted a charrette in October 2014 to determine features of a skatepark to be implemented by California-based Spohn Ranch Skateparks.

== See also ==
- Sykesville Historic District
- Salopha (Sykesville, Maryland)
