= Josh Boone (basketball) =

American basketball player (born 1984)

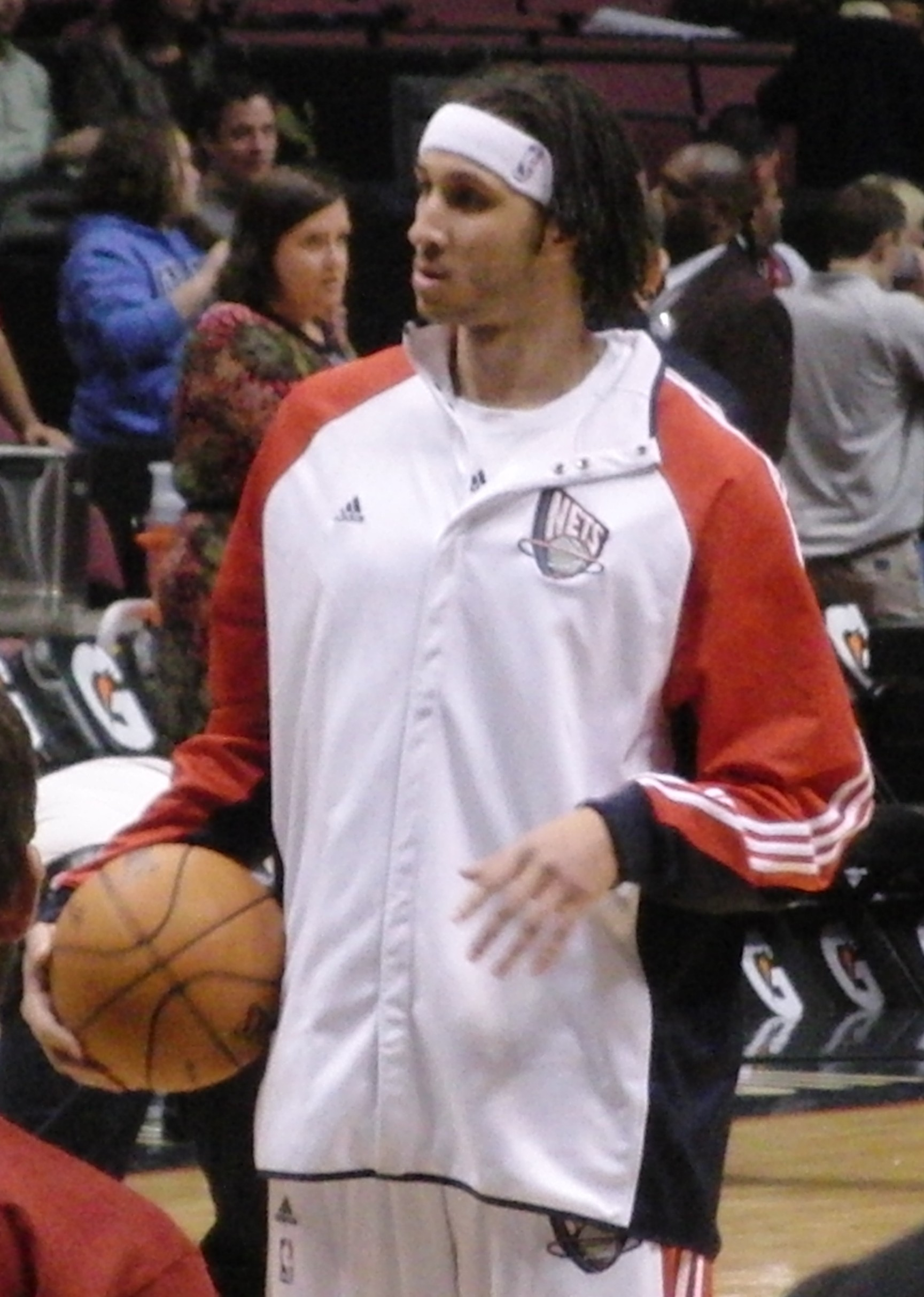

Personal information
- Born: November 21, 1984 (age 41) Mount Airy, Maryland, U.S.
- Listed height: 6 ft 10 in (2.08 m)
- Listed weight: 237 lb (108 kg)

Career information
- High school: South Carroll (Sykesville, Maryland)
- College: UConn (2003–2006)
- NBA draft: 2006: 1st round, 23rd overall pick
- Drafted by: New Jersey Nets
- Playing career: 2006–2022
- Position: Power forward / center

Career history
- 2006–2010: New Jersey Nets
- 2010–2012: Zhejiang Golden Bulls
- 2013: Iowa Energy
- 2014: San Miguel Beermen
- 2014: Iowa Energy
- 2014–2015: Manama
- 2015–2016: BC Kalev
- 2016: Khimki
- 2016: Pınar Karşıyaka
- 2016–2019: Melbourne United
- 2017: Hong Kong Eastern Long Lions
- 2019–2020: Illawarra Hawks
- 2020: Al Nasr
- 2020–2021: Al Riffa
- 2021–2022: Edmonton Stingers
- 2022: Halcones de Xalapa

Career highlights
- NBL champion (2018); All-NBL First Team (2018); NBL rebounding leader (2018); ABL champion (2017); VTB United League rebounding leader (2016); Bahraini Premier League champion (2015); Bahrain Cup champion (2015); CBA Slam Dunk leader (2012); NCAA champion (2004); Second-team All-Big East (2005); Big East Defensive Player of the Year (2005); Big East All-Freshman team (2004)
- Stats at NBA.com
- Stats at Basketball Reference

Oscar Joshua Boone (born November 21, 1984) is an American former professional basketball player. A 6'10" (2.08 m) power forward-center, he played three years of college basketball for UConn. He declared for the 2006 NBA draft after his junior season, forgoing his final year of college.

== High school ==
Born in Mount Airy, Maryland, he attended South Carroll High School in Sykesville, Maryland, where he averaged 20 points, 14.4 rebounds and seven blocked shots per game. He teamed with Indiana-bound Marshall Strickland to lead South Carroll to a 20–6 record. In his junior year, the team tied Governor Thomas Johnson High School for the league championship. South Carroll then lost in the regional semi-finals to top-ranked Paint Branch High School. The next year, he helped lead the team to only the school's second ever state final four appearance, losing to Gwynn Park in the final four. After graduating, he attended West Nottingham Academy (a small college prep school) in Colora, Maryland, averaging 28 points, 16 rebounds and 9.7 blocks per game.

== College ==
=== Freshman ===
Boone played college basketball for UConn and was named to the Big East All-Rookie Team. Started 37 of 38 games at power forward. Averaged 5.9 points, 5.8 rebounds and 1.7 blocks, and shot .554 from the field, for NCAA Champion Huskies. Scored nine points in both Final Four games, and grabbed 14 rebounds in National Semifinal win over Duke. Averaged 8.0 points and 11.3 rebounds in three Big East Tournament games. Set a Big East Tourney record for rebounds in a game by a freshman with a career-high 16 boards in quarterfinal win at Notre Dame. In the Huskies season opener vs. Yale, became the 12th freshman under Jim Calhoun to start the season opener.

=== Sophomore ===
Big East Defensive Player of the Year and All-Big East Second Team selection. Named NABC and USBWA All-District First Team. Started all 31 games at center. Averaged 12.4 points, 8.4 rebounds and 2.9 blocks. Recorded a double-double in 11 games. He registered 18 points and 15 rebounds in 75–70 loss to Boston College. Scored a career-high 22 points and 8 blocked shots in the December 30, 2004 win over Quinnipiac. He topped his career-high with nine blocks, along with seven points and eight rebounds, in win over St. John's on February 5, 2005.

=== Junior ===
All-Big East Honorable Mention and NABC All-District Second Team selection. Started 32 of 34 games at the power forward position. Averaged 10.3 points, 7.0 rebounds and 2.0 blocks. He had eight double-doubles on the season. Tallied 13 points, 11 rebounds and two blocks in a 98–92 Sweet 16 win over Washington on March 24, 2006. Had 12 points, 14 rebounds and four blocks in a narrow 75–74 win over Notre Dame on February 21, 2006. Recorded 17 points and 15 rebounds in a 66–53 win at South Florida on March 1, 2006.

== Professional career ==
=== NBA ===
Boone was picked 23rd overall in the 2006 NBA draft by the New Jersey Nets. He was picked right behind former UConn teammate, Marcus Williams who was also selected by the Nets. During the 2006 Pepsi Pro Summer League in Orlando he led the league in rebounding (9 rpg) and was 2nd in blocked shots (1.67 bpg).

After the summer league he underwent surgery to repair a torn labrum in his left shoulder and was expected to be out for 4–6 months, however he returned much earlier. Boone made his NBA debut December 2, 2006, against the Philadelphia 76ers, playing 2 minutes. Suffering the effects of the injury and missing the pre-season training, Boone had an inconsistent but promising rookie season.

Boone averaged 4.2 points per game, 2.80 rebounds per game and 0.3 blocks per game during his rookie season. On December 26, 2006, he had a season-high of 12 rebounds against the Detroit Pistons, a game in which he played 30 minutes, the most he had played hitherto. Boone had a then career-high 21 points on 10-for-10 shooting, while grabbing six rebounds on March 24, 2007, against the Charlotte Bobcats in Charlotte. The following game, on March 28 against the Indiana Pacers, Josh eclipsed his previous career-high by scoring 22 points on 11-for-13 shooting. He also posted his first double-double by grabbing 10 rebounds.

In late December 2007, Boone earned a spot in the starting lineup. He replaced Jason Collins as the starting center and contributed immediately, putting up a double-double almost every night. During the month of January, Boone was the target of a "Hack-a-Shaq" by Golden State Warriors coach Don Nelson, in which a player is intentionally fouled repeatedly to take advantage of his poor foul shooting. That season, Boone was second-worst in the NBA in free-throw percentage among players with at least one hundred attempts, at 45.6%

Boone would see fewer minutes with the Nets, in part due to his free throw shooting. His accuracy at the line continued to deteriorate, as he hit 37.6% in 2008–09 and 32.8% in 2009–10. Only one player in the league with at least ten attempts had a lower percentage, Andris Biedrins, who made four of twenty-five attempts.

=== Post-NBA ===
After not being re-signed by the Nets, Boone signed to play with the Zhejiang Golden Bulls of China, with whom he would play for parts of three seasons.

On January 17, 2013, Boone was acquired by the Iowa Energy of the NBA D-League. On January 26, after he had played in only two games, it was announced that Boone would miss the rest of the 2012–13 season with a knee injury.

In February 2014, Boone signed with the San Miguel Beermen as an import for the 2014 PBA Commissioner's Cup. He left the next month after just 2 games.

On March 22, 2014, Boone was re-acquired by the Iowa Energy.

In September 2014, Boone signed with Manama of the Bahraini Premier League. He went on to help Manama win their 19th championship in May 2015.

On September 9, 2015, Boone signed with BC Kalev/Cramo of Estonia.

On January 13, 2016, Boone signed with BC Khimki of Russia. He was supposed to replace injured Paul Davis and Ruslan Pateev.

On August 2, 2016, Boone signed with Pınar Karşıyaka of Turkey for the 2016–17 season. On October 24, 2016, he parted ways with Karşıyaka after appearing in only one game.

On December 24, 2016, Boone signed with Melbourne United of the Australian National Basketball League as an injury replacement player.

On February 21, 2017, Boone signed with the Hong Kong Eastern Long Lions of the ASEAN Basketball League. He helped the Long Lions win the championship after they defeated the Singapore Slingers in the ABL Finals.

On April 28, 2017, Boone re-signed with Melbourne United for the 2017–18 NBL season. On August 14, 2018, he re-signed with United for the 2018–19 NBL season.

On May 21, 2019, Boone signed with the Illawarra Hawks for 2019–20 NBL season.

On March 4, 2020, he has signed with Al Nasr of the UAE National Basketball League. Boone signed with Al Riffa of the Bahraini Premier League on August 9.

In November 2021, it was announced Boone was on the roster of Canadian club Edmonton Stingers to strengthen their team for their maiden BCL Americas campaign in the 2021–22 season.

== Career statistics ==
Legend
GP	Games played	GS	Games started	MPG	Minutes per game
FG%	Field goal percentage	3P%	3-point field goal percentage	FT%	Free throw percentage
RPG	Rebounds per game	APG	Assists per game	SPG	Steals per game
BPG	Blocks per game	PPG	Points per game	**Bold**	Career high

=== NBA ===
==== Regular season ====
Year	Team	GP	GS	MPG	FG%	3P%	FT%	RPG	APG	SPG	BPG	PPG
2006–07	New Jersey	61	0	11.0	**.579**	.000	**.544**	2.9	.2	.2	.3	4.2
2007–08	New Jersey	**70**	**53**	**25.3**	.548	.000	.456	**7.3**	**.8**	**.5**	**.9**	**8.2**
2008–09	New Jersey	62	7	16.0	.528	.000	.376	4.2	.5	.4	.8	4.2
2009–10	New Jersey	63	28	16.6	.525	.000	.328	5.0	.5	.5	.8	4.0
Career		256	88	17.5	.544	.000	.445	4.9	.5	.4	.7	5.2

==== Playoffs ====
Year	Team	GP	GS	MPG	FG%	3P%	FT%	RPG	APG	SPG	BPG	PPG
2007	New Jersey	12	0	9.8	.500	.000	.500	1.6	.3	.1	.3	3.0
Career		12	0	9.8	.500	.000	.500	1.6	.3	.1	.3	3.0

=== College ===
Year	Team	GP	GS	MPG	FG%	3P%	FT%	RPG	APG	SPG	BPG	PPG
2003–04	Connecticut	**38**	**37**	22.0	.554	–	.405	5.8	.7	.5	1.7	5.9
2004–05	Connecticut	31	31	**29.5**	**.609**	–	**.664**	**8.4**	**1.2**	**.6**	**2.9**	**12.4**
2005–06	Connecticut	34	32	27.1	.564	–	.547	7.0	.6	.4	2.0	10.3
Career		103	100	25.9	.578	–	.559	7.0	.8	.5	2.2	9.3
