= Brian Plummer (American football) =

American football player (born 1998)

Career information
- High school: South Carroll (Sykesville, Maryland)
- College: Maryland (2018)

Brian Plummer is an American former football player that played at the University of Maryland between 2016 and 2019.

== Early life and education ==
Plummer was raised in Carroll County, Maryland and attended South Carroll High School from 2012 to 2016. He played football, baseball, and basketball his freshman year, giving him special recognition as a tri-sport athlete. His junior year he and the rest of the offensive line helped block for Chris Gavin, who broke the county's all-time single-season rushing record. He was also on the track and field team his senior year of high school, getting first place in 12-lb shot put at the county championship. He made the all-county teams for both football and track his senior year.

== University of Maryland ==
Although he graduated with less than stellar grades, he managed to get a scholarship from Randy Edsall to play for the Terrapins. Despite the replacement of Edsall with University of Michigan defensive coordinator D. J. Durkin, Plummer was still offered the scholarship. At the time of his recruitment he was ranked the 27th best football player in the state of Maryland. After the death of teammate Jordan McNair, Plummer left the team and graduated in the winter of 2019 with a degree in communications and a minor in leadership studies.
