= Christopher Emery =

US government official and author (born 1957)

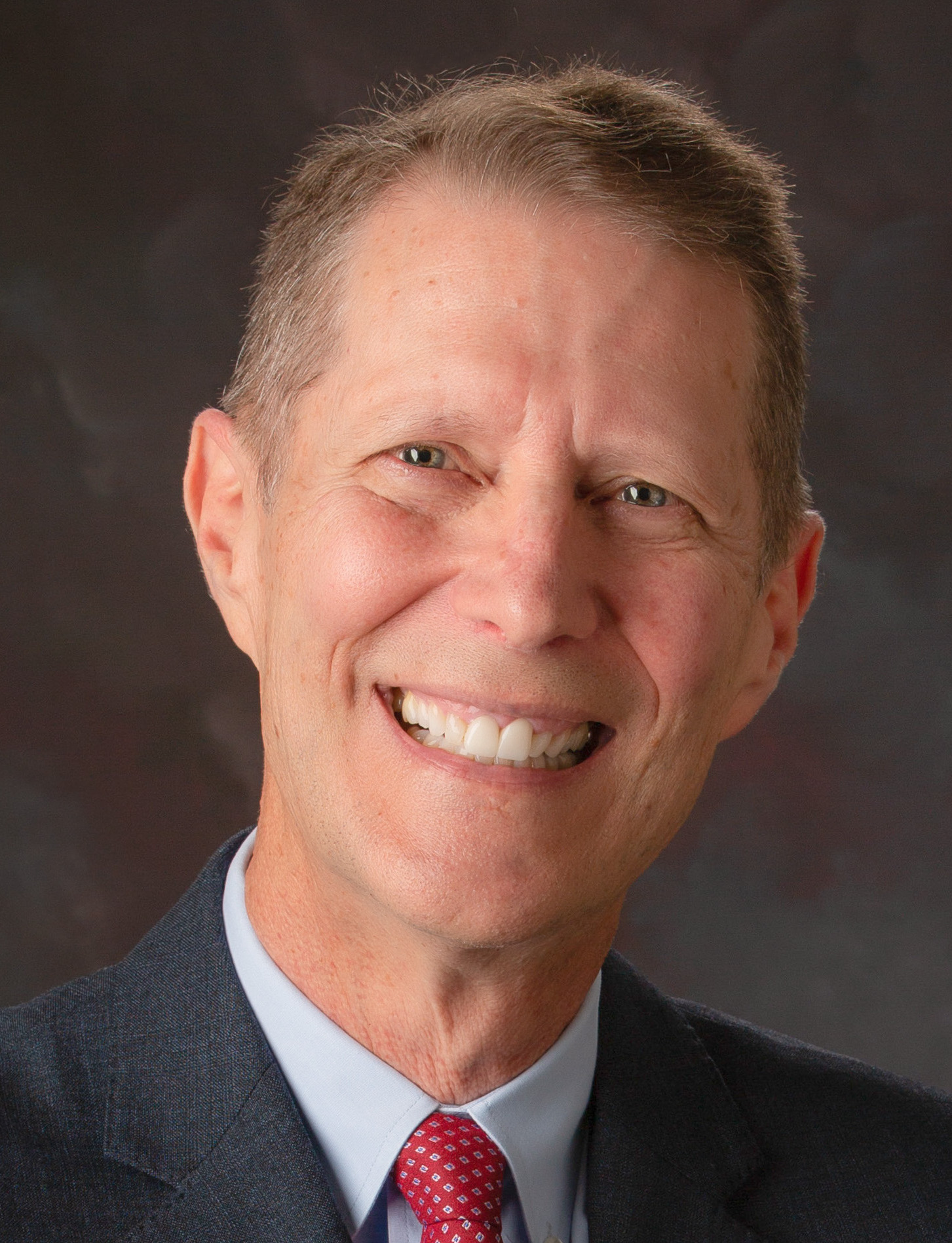
- Emery in 2023

White House Usher
- In office January 1986 – March 1994
- President: Ronald Reagan; George H. W. Bush; Bill Clinton

Personal details
- Born: Christopher Beauregard Emery; August 1, 1957 (age 69) Sykesville, Maryland, US
- Relations: Jennifer Bassey (stepmother); Natasha Gajewski (stepsister)
- Children: 4
- Education: Howard Community College (AA); University of Maryland University College (BS)
- Website: whitehouseusher.com

Christopher Beauregard Emery (born August 1, 1957) is an American author and former government official. He was a White House Usher during the Reagan, George H. W. Bush, and Clinton administrations. Emery later served as the chief information officer of the United States Department of Justice National Security Division and the Architect of the Capitol. He was chief enterprise architect of the U.S. Securities and Exchange Commission. Emery is the author of the memoir White House Usher: Stories from the Inside (2017).

== Early life and education ==
Emery was born in Sykesville, Maryland. His father, Roy Frederick Emery Jr., served in the United Kingdom as a U.S. Army Air Force captain. He was a dairy farmer and attorney in Ellicott City, Maryland, as well a thoroughbred horse breeder later in life. His Parisian mother, Jacqueline Nicole Marchal, served in French Indochina as a nurse in the French Army. She was later a French language teacher at Glenelg Country School, as well as a freelance French and German translator. Emery's parents were married in 1949 and moved from Cooksville, Maryland, to the historic 18th-century residence, Howard Lodge in 1959. Emery has two sisters, Ariane and Lynn. His parents divorced in 1971. His father remarried to actress Jennifer Bassey until his death in 1991. His mother later married former commercial pilot turned statistician Riaz Hussein Rana, through which Emery gained two stepsisters, including Natasha Gajewski.

Emery completed an associate degree from Howard Community College. In 1996, Emery graduated with a B.S. in information systems with a minor in management from the University of Maryland University College where he also completed graduate work in technology management.

== Career ==
=== White House ===
Emery began his career at the White House as a computer specialist after answering a job advertisement in The Washington Post. Soon, White House Chief Usher Gary J. Walters hired him to replace the retiring Nelson Pierce as an assistant White House chief usher. Emery served as an usher in the Reagan Administration beginning in January 1986. In this capacity, he worked in a four-person office to oversee the White House estate, including managing the 89 residence staff. In addition, part of Emery's job was to carry out White House functions such as receptions, dinners, and conferences. In so doing, Emery worked in tandem with the First Family, the White House staff, the chief usher, the press office, the Secret Service, and military leaders. Emery gave personal tours of the White House to private guests including some notable figures such as: Barbra Streisand, Dana Carvey, Ted Williams, Joe DiMaggio, Julia Roberts, Tom Hanks, Julie Andrews, Johnny Carson, and Melanie Griffith.

On March 3, 1994, Emery's unusually abrupt firing was the subject of nationwide news when Hillary Clinton dismissed him for communicating with former first lady Barbara Bush. Despite passing several FBI investigations and background checks, Emery was fired by Hillary Clinton for "an incredible lack of discretion" after communicating twice with the former first lady. He was the first-ever White House usher to be fired. A White House usher does not typically change with administrations. White House Chief Usher Gary J. Walters was not permitted by the White House to testify before a Congressional subcommittee on Emery's dismissal. This led to some suspicions on Capitol Hill that the White House was attempting to avoid scrutiny about the firing.

=== Howard County administrator ===
After his dismissal from the White House, Emery worked for eleven months as a computer consultant. In March 1995, he was appointed council administrator of Howard County, Maryland, replacing former University System of Maryland assistant vice-chancellor Sheila Tolliver. As the council administrator, he oversaw a staff of 25 people with an operating budget of about $1 million. Views on his tenure are split along party lines. He has earned the praise of Republican Council Chairman Charles C. Feaga and Allan H. Kittleman. In June 1996, Emery publicly clashed with Democratic Councilman C. Vernon Gray over his alleged misuse of county funds and resources to aid in his campaign for a position with the National Association of Counties (NAOC). Weeks later, Gray wrongfully accused Emery of leaking NAOC campaign letters to The Baltimore Sun. Emery was vindicated by the Howard County Police Department; Gray subsequently found his letters in a different file in his office. Effective December 4, 1998, Emery resigned when Democrats regained the majority on the Howard County Council.

=== Later years ===
After his time as a council administrator, Emery returned to the federal government as a supervisory information technology specialist at the Architect of the Capitol (AOC) where he later served as the director of information resources management. Emery was promoted to chief enterprise architect of the AOC beginning in 2007. In this capacity, he oversaw the enterprise and technology management of the U.S. Capitol, Senate, the House of Representatives, the Library of Congress, and the Supreme Court. He contributed, along with other information enterprise professionals from the federal government, private sector, and academia, to the publication of The Integrated Enterprise Life Cycle: Enterprise Architecture, Investment Management, and System Development. With colleagues at the AOC and the National Science Foundation, Emery also published a paper for the 40th Hawaii International Conference on System Sciences. In 2009, he became the chief information officer of the AOC.

In 2010, Emery served as the director of portfolio governance in the Office of the Chief CIO for the U.S. Department of Homeland Security. Two years later, in December 2012, he became the first chief information officer of the United States Department of Justice National Security Division. There he served on the DOJ CIO Council to help develop the strategic plan for the department's information and technology goals for fiscal years 2015–2018.

Emery served as the chief enterprise architect for the U.S. Securities and Exchange Commission from 2015 to January 2020.

== Selected works ==
- Emery, Christopher B. (2017). White House Usher: Stories from the Inside. Booklocker.com. ISBN 978-1634926560.
- Emery, Christopher B. (2021). Who Killed the President?. Booklocker.com. ISBN 978-1-64719-761-2.
- Emery, Christopher B. (August 25, 2023). Who Shot the Speaker?. BookLocker.com, Inc. ISBN 979-8-88531-564-7.

== Personal life ==
Emery is a past resident of Laurel, Maryland, and Washington, D.C. He has one daughter and three stepchildren.
