= 2017–18 Melbourne United season =

- NBL champions
- Regular season champions
- Head coach: (Australia) Dean Vickerman
- Captain: (Australia) Chris Goulding
- Arena: Hisense Arena

NBL results
- Record: 20–8 (71.4%)
- Ladder: 1st
- Finals finish: Champions (5th title) (Defeated 36ers 3–2)
- Stats at NBL.com.au

Player records
- Points: (United States) Prather 16.1
- Rebounds: (United States) Boone 9.4
- Assists: (United States) Ware 4.7
- Efficiency: (United States) Boone 63%
- All statistics correct as of 31 March 2018.

The 2017–18 NBL season was the 35th season for Melbourne United in the NBL, and the 4th under the banner of Melbourne United.

== Roster ==
Note: Flags indicate national team eligibility at FIBA-sanctioned events. Players may hold other non-FIBA nationalities not displayed.

2017–18 Melbourne United roster
Players
Coaches

Pos.	No.	Nat.	Name	Ht.	Wt.
G	0	(United States)	Felix, Carrick (IN)	1.98 m (6 ft 6 in)	92 kg (203 lb)
F	2	(Australia)	Von Hofe, Felix (DP)	1.96 m (6 ft 5 in)	91 kg (201 lb)
F/C	3	(United States)	Boone, Josh (I)	2.08 m (6 ft 10 in)	108 kg (238 lb)
G	5	(Australia)	Short, Sam (DP)	1.95 m (6 ft 5 in)	78 kg (172 lb)
G	7	(Australia)	Hooley, Peter	1.93 m (6 ft 4 in)	91 kg (201 lb)
G	8	(Australia)	Adnam, Kyle	1.85 m (6 ft 1 in)	84 kg (185 lb)
F	9	(Australia)	Moller, Craig	2.03 m (6 ft 8 in)	93 kg (205 lb)
G	12	(Australia)	Dillon, Daniel (injured) (IN)	1.93 m (6 ft 4 in)	91 kg (201 lb)
F/C	13	(Australia)	Andersen, David	2.11 m (6 ft 11 in)	113 kg (249 lb)
F/C	14	(New Zealand)	Smith-Milner, Tohi (DP)	2.06 m (6 ft 9 in)	112 kg (247 lb)
F	20	(Australia)	Barlow, David	2.05 m (6 ft 9 in)	97 kg (214 lb)
G	21	(United States)	Ware, Casper (I)	1.78 m (5 ft 10 in)	79 kg (174 lb)
F/C	22	(South Sudan)	Majok, Majok	2.06 m (6 ft 9 in)	100 kg (220 lb)
G/F	23	(United States)	Prather, Casey (I)	1.98 m (6 ft 6 in)	96 kg (212 lb)
G	25	(Australia)	McDonald, Durrell (DP)	1.88 m (6 ft 2 in)	79 kg (174 lb)
F	42	(Guam)	Wesley, Tai (SRP)	2.01 m (6 ft 7 in)	109 kg (240 lb)
G	43	(Australia)	Goulding, Chris (C)	1.92 m (6 ft 4 in)	92 kg (203 lb)
F	54	(Australia)	Patton, Chris	2.08 m (6 ft 10 in)	112 kg (247 lb)
C	–	(China)	Jet Meng (TP)	2.18 m (7 ft 2 in)

Head coach

- (Australia) Dean Vickerman

Assistant coach(es)

- (United States) Mike Kelly
- (United States) Simon Mitchell
- (Australia) Justin Schueller

Legend

- (C) Team captain
- (DP) Development player
- (IN) Inactive
- (I) Import player
- (TP) Training player
- (SRP) Special restricted player
- Injured

- Roster
Updated: 24 January 2018

== Preseason ==
=== Game log ===
2017 pre-season game log
Total: 8–3 (Home: 5–1; Road: 3–2)
May: 2–0 (Home: 0–0; Road: 2–0)

Game	Date	Team	Score	High points	High rebounds	High assists	Location Attendance	Record
1	17 May	@ Jiangsu Dragons	W 72–85	Adnam, Wesley (25)	Tai Wesley (8)	Kyle Adnam (7)	Wutaishan Gymnasium not available	1–0
2	19 May	@ Jiangsu Dragons	W 56–63	Majok Majok (16)	not available	not available	Yancheng Sports Center not available	2–0

July: 1–0 (Home: 1–0; Road: 0–0)

Game	Date	Team	Score	High points	High rebounds	High assists	Location Attendance	Record
3	16 July	China	W 104–94 (OT)	Andersen, Moller (20)	not available	not available	Margaret Court Arena; 6,888	3–0

August: 2–0 (Home: 2–0; Road: 0–0)

Game	Date	Team	Score	High points	High rebounds	High assists	Location Attendance	Record
4	16 August	Texas Longhorns	W 85–75	Chris Goulding (18)	Jerry Evans (10)	not available	Nunawading Basketball Centre	4–0
5	20 August	Wisconsin Badgers	W 90–89	Tai Wesley (23)	not available	not available	Casey Stadium; 1,500	5–0

September: 3–2 (Home: 2–1; Road: 1–1)

Game	Date	Team	Score	High points	High rebounds	High assists	Location Attendance	Record
6	7 September	Illawarra	W 99–83	Kyle Adnam (24)	not available	Kyle Adnam (7)	Traralgon Sports Stadium; 3,000	6–0
7	9 September	Sydney	L 99–105	Tai Wesley (27)	Josh Boone (9)	Goulding, Ware (4)	Traralgon Sports Stadium; 3,000	6–1
8	10 September	Perth	W 93–67	Tai Wesley (18)	Boone, Wesley (7)	Casper Ware (7)	State Basketball Centre; 3,200	7–1
9	17 September	@ New Zealand	L 88–86	Chris Goulding (18)	not available	not available	TSB Stadium; 4,560	7–2
10	19 September	@ New Zealand	W 62–101	Josh Boone (17)	not available	not available	ASB Arena not available	8–2

October: 0–1 (Home: 0–0; Road: 0–1)

Game	Date	Team	Score	High points	High rebounds	High assists	Location Attendance	Record
11	8 October	@ Oklahoma City	L 85–86	Casper Ware (22)	Josh Boone (9)	Casey Prather (5)	Chesapeake Energy Arena; 10,203	8–3

== Regular season ==
=== Ladder ===
Pos	2017–18 NBL season											
Pos	Team	Pld	W	L	PCT	Last 5	Streak	Home	Away	PF	PA	PP
1	Melbourne United	28	20	8	71.43%	4–1	L1	11–3	9–5	2434	2298	105.92%
2	Adelaide 36ers	28	18	10	64.29%	3–2	W3	10–4	8–6	2654	2527	105.03%
3	Perth Wildcats	28	16	12	57.14%	2–3	W1	9–5	7–7	2388	2271	105.15%
4	New Zealand Breakers	28	15	13	53.57%	1–4	L4	9–5	6–8	2364	2387	99.04%
5	Illawarra Hawks	28	12	16	42.86%	2–3	W2	7–7	5–9	2474	2539	97.44%
6	Cairns Taipans^{1}	28	11	17	39.29%	1–4	L1	8–6	3–11	2215	2281	97.11%
7	Sydney Kings^{1}	28	11	17	39.29%	4–1	W4	6–8	5–9	2418	2504	96.57%
8	Brisbane Bullets	28	9	19	32.14%	1–4	L3	6–8	3–11	2347	2487	94.37%

Updated to match(es) played on 18 February 2018. Source: NBL.com.au

The NBL tie-breaker system as outlined in the NBL Rules and Regulations states that in the case of an identical win–loss record, the overall points percentage between the teams will determine order of seeding.

^{1}Cairns Taipans won on overall points percentage.

=== Ladder Progression ===
- Numbers highlighted in green indicate that the team finished the round inside the top four.
- Numbers highlighted in blue indicates the team finished first on the ladder in that round.
- Numbers highlighted in red indicates the team finished last place on the ladder in that round.

2017–18 NBL season
Team	1	2	3	4	5	6	7	8	9	10	11	12	13	14	15	16	17	18	19
Adelaide 36ers	4	4	3	3	4	4	3	3	4	4	4	4	4	4	2	2	3	2	2
Brisbane Bullets	7	7	6	6	7	6	7	7	6	5	6	7	7	7	7	7	7	7	8
Cairns Taipans	1	3	4	4	6	7	5	5	5	6	5	6	6	6	5	6	6	5	6
Illawarra Hawks	5	8	7	8	5	5	6	6	7	7	7	5	5	5	6	5	5	6	5
Melbourne United	3	2	5	5	3	3	4	4	3	3	3	2	2	1	1	1	1	1	1
New Zealand Breakers	8	5	1	2	1	1	1	1	2	2	1	3	3	3	3	4	2	4	4
Perth Wildcats	2	1	2	1	2	2	2	2	1	1	2	1	1	2	4	3	4	3	3
Sydney Kings	6	6	8	7	8	8	8	8	8	8	8	8	8	8	8	8	8	8	7

=== Game log ===
2017–18 game log
Total: 20–8 (Home: 11–3; Road: 9–5)
October: 2–3 (Home: 0–1; Road: 2–2)

Game	Date	Team	Score	High points	High rebounds	High assists	Location Attendance	Record
1	5 October	@ Adelaide	W 97–99	Casper Ware (23)	Josh Boone (10)	Casper Ware (6)	Titanium Security Arena; 6,312	1–0
2	14 October	@ Adelaide	W 79–99	Kyle Adnam (23)	Josh Boone (10)	Casper Ware (6)	Titanium Security Arena not available	2–0
3	20 October	@ Perth	L 89–84	Casey Prather (16)	Casey Prather (9)	Goulding, Ware (3)	Perth Arena; 13,037	2–1
4	22 October	New Zealand	L 76–88	Josh Boone (22)	Josh Boone (14)	Casper Ware (6)	Hisense Arena; 10,300	2–2
5	28 October	@ Brisbane	L 87–85	Casey Prather (30)	Josh Boone (14)	Casper Ware (4)	Carrara Stadium not available	2–3

November: 3–2 (Home: 3–1; Road: 0–1)

Game	Date	Team	Score	High points	High rebounds	High assists	Location Attendance	Record
6	2 November	Cairns	W 87–65	Casper Ware (26)	Majok Majok (9)	Prather, Ware (3)	Hisense Arena; 6,542	3–3
7	4 November	Adelaide	W 101–82	Casey Prather (25)	David Andersen (7)	Casper Ware (8)	Hisense Arena; 8,213	4–3
8	9 November	@ Cairns	L 92–69	Ware, Wesley (12)	Casey Prather (6)	Casey Prather (5)	Cairns Convention Centre; 3,891	4–4
9	11 November	Sydney	W 108–90	Casey Prather (22)	Josh Boone (13)	Casper Ware (9)	Hisense Arena; 8,196	5–4
10	19 November	Perth	L 59–91	Casey Prather (20)	Josh Boone (12)	Kyle Adnam (2)	Hisense Arena; 10,300	5–5

December: 6–1 (Home: 4–0; Road: 2–1)

Game	Date	Team	Score	High points	High rebounds	High assists	Location Attendance	Record
11	4 December	Illawarra	W 91–73	Casey Prather (18)	Josh Boone (14)	Tai Wesley (8)	Hisense Arena; 6,054	6–5
12	9 December	@ Cairns	79–70	Tai Wesley (20)	Josh Boone (8)	Casper Ware (4)	Cairns Convention Centre; 4,151	6–6
13	11 December	Sydney	W 95–69	Chris Goulding (23)	Josh Boone (17)	Casper Ware (7)	Hisense Arena; 8,194	7–6
14	16 December	@ Illawarra	W 78–84	Tai Wesley (19)	Josh Boone (10)	Tai Wesley (8)	WIN Entertainment Centre; 2,150	8–6
15	22 December	Adelaide	W 99–91	Casper Ware (24)	Josh Boone (12)	Casper Ware (5)	Hisense Arena; 8,089	9–6
16	26 December	Brisbane	W 69–68	David Andersen (15)	Josh Boone (11)	Tai Wesley (3)	Hisense Arena; 10,300	10–6
17	30 December	@ Sydney	W 79–103	Casper Ware (26)	Tai Wesley (8)	Goulding, Ware (5)	Qudos Bank Arena; 6,014	11–6

January: 5–1 (Home: 1–0; Road: 4–1)

Game	Date	Team	Score	High points	High rebounds	High assists	Location Attendance	Record
18	6 January	@ Illawarra	W 77–79	Chris Goulding (22)	Carrick Felix (10)	Casper Ware (5)	WIN Entertainment Centre; 2,869	12–6
19	12 January	@ Perth	W 80–82	Tai Wesley (21)	Tai Wesley (10)	Tai Wesley (5)	Perth Arena; 13,611	13–6
20	18 January	@ New Zealand	L 98–81	Chris Goulding (21)	Josh Boone (7)	Casper Ware (5)	North Shore Events Centre not available	13–7
21	20 January	@ Brisbane	W 95–103	Casper Ware (22)	Ware, Wesley (5)	Tai Wesley (8)	Brisbane Entertainment Centre; 4,650	14–7
22	24 January	Cairns	W 79–68	Casper Ware (24)	Josh Boone (9)	Chris Goulding (6)	Hisense Arena; 7,306	15–7
23	28 January	@ Sydney	W 76–93	Josh Boone (22)	Josh Boone (13)	Casper Ware (4)	Qudos Bank Arena; 7,407	16–7

February: 4–1 (Home: 3–1; Road: 1–0)

Game	Date	Team	Score	High points	High rebounds	High assists	Location Attendance	Record
24	3 February	Brisbane	W 69–61	Casper Ware (17)	Josh Boone (12)	Tai Wesley (5)	Hisense Arena; 10,300	17–7
25	9 February	New Zealand	W 89–83	Casper Ware (26)	Josh Boone (12)	Casper Ware (5)	Hisense Arena; 7,256	18–7
26	11 February	@ New Zealand	W 82–100	Chris Goulding (21)	Barlow, Boone (7)	Casper Ware (9)	Spark Arena; 5,000	19–7
27	16 February	Perth	W 97–85	Goulding, Ware (19)	Josh Boone (10)	Craig Moller (4)	Hisense Arena; 7,064	20–7
28	18 February	Illawarra	L 84–94	Boone, Wesley (14)	Casey Prather (6)	Casper Ware (6)	Hisense Arena; 7,981	20–8

== Postseason ==
2018 finals game log
Total: 5–2 (Home: 4–0; Road: 1–2)
Semifinals: 2–0 (Home: 1–0; Road: 1–0)

Game	Date	Team	Score	High points	High rebounds	High assists	Location Attendance	Record
1	3 March	New Zealand	W 88–77	Casper Ware (33)	Josh Boone (8)	Tai Wesley (4)	Hisense Arena; 6,833	1–0
2	5 March	@ New Zealand	W 86–88 (OT)	Josh Boone (33)	Josh Boone (15)	Casper Ware (6)	Spark Arena not available	2–0

Grand Final: 3–2 (Home: 3–0; Road: 0–2)

Game	Date	Team	Score	High points	High rebounds	High assists	Location Attendance	Record
1	16 March	Adelaide	W 107–96	Chris Goulding (26)	Boone, Wesley (7)	Tai Wesley (6)	Hisense Arena; 8,699	1–0
2	18 March	@ Adelaide	L 110–95	Casey Prather (20)	Casey Prather (7)	Chris Goulding (3)	Titanium Security Arena; 7,000	1–1
3	23 March	Adelaide	W 101–98	Casper Ware (25)	Casey Prather (6)	Casper Ware (3)	Hisense Arena; 9,362	2–1
4	25 March	@ Adelaide	L 90–81	Casey Prather (23)	Casey Prather (7)	Chris Goulding (4)	Titanium Security Arena; 7,500	2–2
5	31 March	Adelaide	W 100–82	Goulding, Ware (23)	Josh Boone (12)	Tai Wesley (3)	Hisense Arena; 10,300	3–2

== Transactions ==
=== Re-signed ===
Player	Signed
Kyle Adnam	7 April
Majok Majok	21 April
Josh Boone	28 April
David Barlow	15 June
Casper Ware	22 August

=== Additions ===
Player	Signed	Former team
Craig Moller	13 April	Sydney Kings
Daniel Dillon	22 June	Hiroshima Dragonflies
Peter Hooley	3 August	Ballarat Miners
Casey Prather	15 August	ratiopharm Ulm
Durrell McDonald	13 October	Mercyhurst Lakers
Felix Von Hofe	13 October	Eastern Washington Eagles
Jet Meng (Training)	16 November	Shanghai Sharks
Carrick Felix	22 December	Long Island Nets
Chris Patton	24 January	Cairns Taipans

=== Subtractions ===
Player	Reason left	New team
Lasan Kromah	Free agent	Egis Körmend
Owen Odigie	Released	Kilsyth Cobras
Todd Blanchfield	Free agent	Sydney Kings
Ramone Moore	Free agent	Melbourne United

== Awards ==
=== NBL Awards ===
- All-NBL First Team: Josh Boone & Casper Ware
- All-NBL Second Team: Tai Wesley
- Coach of the Year: Dean Vickerman

=== Melbourne United Awards ===
- Most Valuable Player: Casper Ware
- Best Defensive Player: Josh Boone
- Coaches Award: Chris Goulding
- Most Improved: Tai Wesley
- Best Club Person Award: Andrew Kidd

=== Finals Series ===
- Grand Final MVP: Chris Goulding

== See also ==
- 2017–18 NBL season
- Melbourne United
