= South Carroll High School =

Coordinates: 39.4430°N 77.0414°W

Location
- 1300 W. Old Liberty Road; Sykesville, Maryland; United States

Information
- Type: Public Secondary
- Motto: "Once a Cavalier, Always A Cavalier”
- Established: 1965
- Status: open
- School district: Carroll County Public Schools
- Category: Public School Grade (9-12)
- Principal: Christina Dougherty
- Campus: 142.4 acres (0.576 km^{2})
- Colors: Black and Gold
- Mascot: Cavaliers
- Rival: Liberty Lions
- National ranking: 3,035
- Yearbook: Sword and Shield
- Website: www.carrollk12.org/schools/high/sch
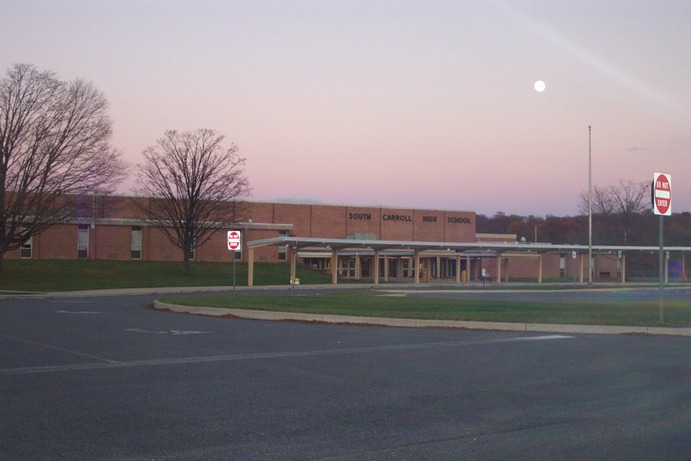

South Carroll High School (SCHS) is a four-year public high school in Sykesville in Carroll County, Maryland, United States. The school is located near the southwest corner of Carroll County on Liberty Road between Maryland Route 27 and Maryland Route 97.

== About the school ==
South Carroll School was established in 1965 in Sykesville, Maryland as part of the Carroll County Public School system. The building is 205,000 square feet (19,000 m^{2}).

== Students ==
As of 2022–2023 the enrollment is 924.

== Extra-curricular activities ==
South Carroll High School has won the following state championships.

South Carroll High School State Champions

- Boys' Cross Country: 1997, 1998, 2000
- Girls' Cross Country: 2007
- Field Hockey: 1980, 1983, 1991, 2002, 2018, 2023
- Girls' Basketball: 1977-78
- Baseball: 1999, 2002
- Volleyball: 2007
- Wrestling: 2014, 2015, 2016, 2017, 2022, 2023, 2024, 2025, 2026
- Marching Band: 1996, 1997
- Golf: 2023
- Winter Cheerleading: 2024
- Girls Lacrosse: 2025
- Girls Soccer: 2025

Additionally, South Carroll High School counts two former varsity athletes as notable alumni. Josh Boone and Marshall Strickland both played men's basketball in the late 1990s and early 2000s (decade). Boone went on to win an NCAA Division I championship in 2004 as a forward on the University of Connecticut men's team and was drafted in 2006 by the NBA's New Jersey Nets as the 23rd overall pick. Strickland was the starting point guard at Indiana University for three years. In 2021, The Cavaliers varsity football team went 12-0 and made the 1A/2A MMPSAA State Championship, But lost to Dunbar High School. The South Carroll wrestling team has crowned more individual state titles than any other public school program in the state, making South Carroll the winningest wrestling program in Maryland Public school history.

== Notable alumni ==
- Josh Boone - NBA player
- Blair Grubb - Physician, researcher and writer
- Mike Jenkins- world-class strongman
- Mike Mooney - a tackle that went to Georgia Tech Yellow Jackets and the San Diego Chargers
- Brian Plummer - College football player, University of Maryland
- Lorenza Ponce - vocalist, string player, songwriter
- Marshall Strickland - college basketball player
- Silas Kelly - NFL and XFL football player
