= Marshall Strickland =

American basketball player

Personal information
- Born: March 1, 1983 (age 42); Kingston, Massachusetts, U.S.
- Listed height: 6 ft 2 in (1.88 m)

Career information
- High school: South Carroll (Sykesville, Maryland)
- College: Indiana (2002–2006)
- NBA draft: 2006: undrafted
- Playing career: 2006–2011
- Position: Shooting guard

Career history
- 2006–2008: Alpella
- 2008: Galatasaray
- 2008–2009: TED Ankara Kolejliler
- 2009–2010: Fileni BPA Jesi
- 2011: AZS Koszalin

Marshall Strickland (born March 1, 1983) is an American former professional basketball player. He played college basketball at Indiana University from 2002 to 2006. He is originally from Kingston, Massachusetts and went to Winchendon Prep in Winchendon before transferring to South Carroll High School in Carroll County, Maryland. He is 6 ft 2 in (1.88 m) tall and weighs 195 pounds (88 kg). He is the son of Marshall and Joanna Strickland and younger brother of former Maryland Terrapins star Marche Strickland. Marshall graduated from the University of Maryland School of Dentistry in 2017.

== College career ==
- As a senior, coach Mike Davis started him in every game for which he was healthy. He averaged 11.9 points per game and was third on the team behind Robert Vaden and Marco Killingsworth. He was first in minutes per game with 34.5 and first in FT percentage, shooting 94%.
- As a junior, he started in 28 out of 29 games leading, the team in assists with 3.4 per game.
- As a sophomore, he was an honorable All-Big Ten selection by the coaches. He was second on the team with 10.8 points and 26th overall in the Big Ten. He was also 11th in the league in three-point field goal percentage (.367, 58 of 158).
- As a freshman, he played consistent minutes with a season-high 17 points in the championship game of the Maui Invitational. As a senior in high school, he was an All-Metro honoree, averaging 30.5 points, 4.3 assists and 1.9 steals. He shot 52% from the floor, and his team finished with a 20–5 record.
- As a recruit, ESPN and RivalsHoops.com ranked him among the top five point guards.
