= Jennifer Bassey =

American actress (born 1939)

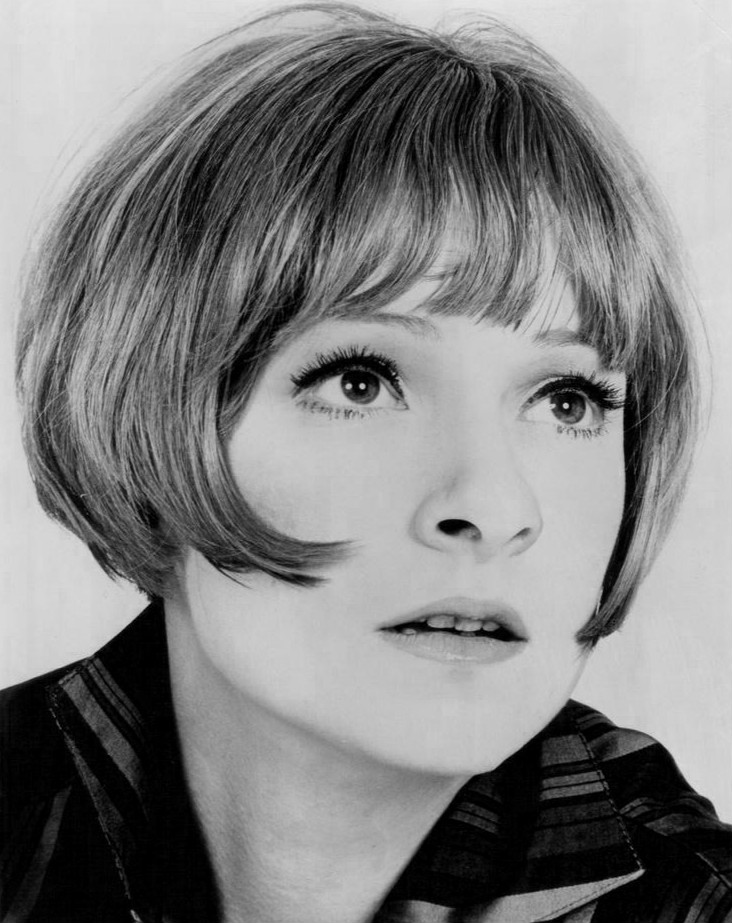
- Bassey in 1967
- Born: July 22, 1939 (age 85); Chicago, Illinois, U.S.
- Occupation: Actress
- Years active: 1969–present
- Spouses: Roy F. Emery (m. 1971; died 1991) Luther Davis (m. 2004; died 2008)
- Children: Christopher Emery (stepson)

Jennifer Bassey (born July 22, 1939) is an American actress who has worked on both stage and screen. She is perhaps best known for her role as Marian Colby in the ABC soap opera All My Children which she played on and off from 1983 until the show's cancellation in 2011.

== Life and career ==
Bassey was born in Chicago, Illinois. After graduating from Royal Academy of Dramatic Art in London, Bassey moved back to the United States and took roles in several Off-Broadway plays. This led to further work in daytime soap operas.

After appearing in Love of Life, The Edge of Night, and Somerset, Bassey changed her professional name from "Joan Bassie" to "Jennifer Bassey." She chose the name Jennifer from Dr. Jennifer Stark, the role she had played on Love of Life. In the early 1990s, Bassey was one of several actresses brought in briefly to replace Eileen Fulton as Lisa on As the World Turns while Fulton was ill.

She began playing Marian Colby on ABC's soap opera All My Children (1983-1987, 1989, 1995-2009, 2011). She has appeared on All My Children for over 20 years and was a favorite among fans.

A libidinous wealthy widow with a penchant for forbidden romantic trysts, Marian was featured in a variety of storylines, allowing Bassey to showcase a variety of talents in both comedy and drama. In 1998, Bassey won the Soap Opera Digest Award for "Favorite Scene Stealer," and in 1999, alongside co-star David Canary, won the same award for "Favorite Couple". Also, in 1999, Bassey received her first Daytime Emmy nomination in the "Outstanding Supporting Actress" category. Bassey appeared on All My Children in both contract and recurring capacities until the show's 2011 network cancellation, but did not appear on the show's short-lived online incarnation.

Bassey did not participate in the February 2, 2017 All My Children reunion on the Hallmark Channel's Home & Family show. However, Home & Family did utilize footage of Bassey with actor Michael E. Knight from an infamous All My Children storyline wherein Knight's youthful Tad Martin had affairs with both Marian Colby and her daughter Liza (played by Marcy Walker).

Bassey also has appeared in a number of prime time television shows, including recurring roles on Falcon Crest and Grey's Anatomy, and well as guest shots on In the Heat of the Night, Who's the Boss?, Murphy Brown, Matlock, L.A. Law, and Law & Order. Her film credits include Waxwork (1988), The Bonfire of the Vanities (1990), Dunston Checks In (1996), and 27 Dresses (2007).

In 2017, Bassey returned to daytime television in both its traditional and new media incarnations, joining the casts of ABC soap opera General Hospital playing Quinn Danvers, and Daytime Emmy-winning digital soap opera Anacostia as Beverly Newman. For her performance as Beverly on Anacostia, Bassey received her second Daytime Emmy nomination in the "Outstanding Guest Performer in a Digital Drama" category in 2018.

== Personal life ==
Bassey has been married twice, she married attorney Roy F. Emery in 1971 until his death in 1991. In 2004, she married her longtime companion, playwright Luther Davis until his death in 2008 at the age of 91. In November 2016 she became engaged to George Bamford in Waikiki, Hawaii.

In June 2015, Bassey made headlines when she was forced off a commercial airliner after a dispute with a flight attendant.

Bassey resides in Manhattan and West Palm Beach, Florida.

== Filmography ==
=== Film ===
Year	Title	Role	Notes
1988	Side by Side	Jennifer Benson	TV film
1988	Waxwork	Mrs. Loftmore	
1988	Goddess of Love	Mrs. Wilson	TV film
1989	Charlie	Betty Wald	TV film
1990	The Platinum Triangle	Mrs. Farber	
1990	The Bonfire of the Vanities	Diplomat's Wife	
1992	Twogether	Mrs. McKenzie	
1992	Stepfather III	Dr. Brady	TV film
1992	Revenge of the Nerds III: The Next Generation	Ruth	TV film
1992	Singles		Uncredited
1994	Illicit Dreams	Real Estate Woman	
1996	Dunston Checks In	Angela Dellacroce	
2000	It Had to Be You	Mrs. Allen	
2008	27 Dresses	Jane's Aunt	
2011	The Brothers Sinclair	Vivian Sinclair	
2017	The Depths	Mrs. Peters	
2020	Kombucha Cure	Hanna Nowacki	
2020	Until We Meet Again	Linda Davis Thompson	
2020	Magic in Mount Holly	Mrs. Halsen	

=== Television ===
Year	Title	Role	Notes
1969-1971	Love of Life	Dr. Jennifer Stark	
1975	Somerset	Dorothy Conrad	
1976-1977	The Edge of Night	Abby Wolcott	
1983-2011	All My Children	Marian Colby Chandler	Series regular
1984	Paper Dolls	Anna Crane	1 episode
1985	ABC Weekend Special	Mrs. Waterford	Episode: "Columbus Circle"
1987	L.A. Law	Rita Stenheiser	Episode: "The Grace of Wrath"
1988	In the Heat of the Night	Eugete Davenport	Episode: "A Necessary Evil"
1988	Duet	Mrs. Paxton	Episode: "Oh Boy!"
1988	Dear John	Eleanor Guthrie	Episode: "Politics as Usual"
1989	Who's the Boss?	Beverly Fiske	Episode: "Party Double"
1989	The Robert Guillaume Show	Martha	Episode: "Hello Again"
1989	Falcon Crest	Cynthia Wallace	4 episodes
1989	Matlock	Evie Malone	Episode: "The Good Boy"
1990	Murphy Brown	Nancy	Episode: "On the Road Again"
1990	Over My Dead Body	Clarice	Episode: "A Passing Inspection"
1991	Jake and the Fatman	Sara Fairchild	Episode: "Let's Call the Whole Thing Off"
1991	Pros and Cons		Episode: "Murder Most Perfect"
1993	Reasonable Doubts	Dr. Nagel	2 episodes
1993	Matlock	Gloria Morrell	Episode: "The Debt"
1993	Tropical Heat	Polly	Episode: "Slumming It"
1993	L.A. Law	Judge Helen Caplan	Episode: "Foreign Co-respondent"
1994	The Byrds of Paradise	Sylvia Paton	Episode: "Back in the Saddle
1994	Silk Stalkings	Brooke Dupree	Episode: "Time Share"
1995	Robin's Hoods	Cynthia Hollings	Episode: "The Heartbreaker"
1995	Coach	Alice	Episode: "Fool for Lunch"
1995	Hudson Street	Betsy Clifford	Episode: "Contempt"
1996	ABC Afterschool Special	Mrs. Hanff	Episode: "Educating Mom"
1997	Silk Stalkings	Meg Gordon	Episode: "Night of the Parrot"
2002	Law & Order	Mrs. Conley	Episode: "Access Nation"
2007	30 Rock	Old Vibrant Lady	Episode: "Cleveland"
2012	Body of Proof	Female Guest #2	Episode: "Falling for You"
2013	Grey's Anatomy	Nancy Dawson	3 episodes
2017	Woman of a Certain Age	Older Kate	Mini-series
2017	General Hospital	Quinn Danvers	4 episodes
2017	Greenport	Jean	
2017	Anacostia	Beverly Newman	2 episodes
2020	Quarantine	Joyce	3 episodes
2020	The Church of Mike	Mrs. MacAuley	Episode: "The Church of Mike"
