= Sykesville station =

Former rail station in Maryland, U.S.

Coordinates: 39.36424°N 76.96921°W

Sykesville
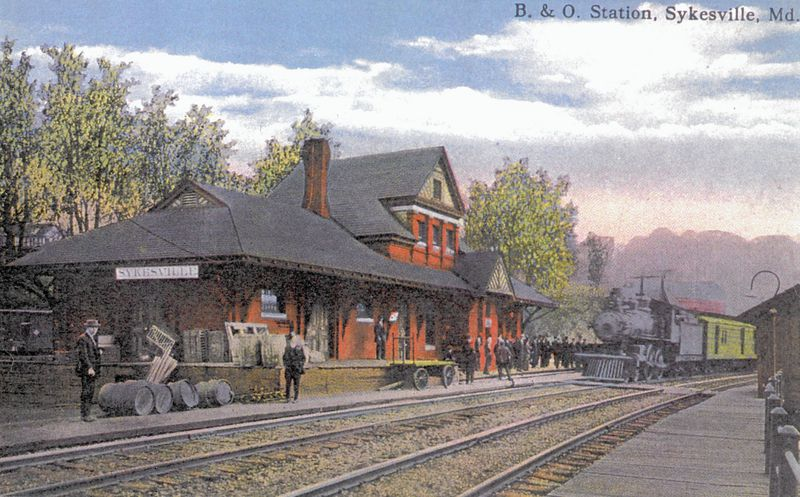

General information
- Location: Sykesville, Maryland; United States

History
- Opened: 1831
- Closed: 1950
- Rebuilt: 1883

Former services
Preceding station	Baltimore and Ohio Railroad	Following station
Hood’s Mill toward Point of Rocks	Old Main Line	Gorsuch toward Baltimore Camden
Location

Sykesville station is a historic railway station was built by the Baltimore and Ohio Railroad's Old Main Line in 1831, located in the town of Sykesville, Maryland in Howard County on 7618 West Main Street. Sykesville had two side platforms, two railroad tracks, and a station building. The station was closed in 1950 and the station building is now a restaurant.

== History ==
In 1831, the B&O Railroad expanded the Old Main Line past its former terminus of Ellicott City station. The station was originally called "Horse Train Stop" because Sykesville hadn't been named yet. On June 21, 1863, railroad workers went on strike which started one of the most violent incidents in early railroad history, The Sykes Mill Railroad Riot of 1831. On the Confederate's way to Gettysburg in 1863, the cavalry destroyed the railroad tracks, along with other infrastructure in the town.

In 1883, the current station building was designed and built by Ephraim Francis Baldwin and was opened in 1884. The station stopped being used for passenger trains in 1950 and the tracks are still used for cargo trains. In 1959, the line was reduced to one track, the far one from the station building. Today, the station house has become a restaurant called the "Sykesville Station Restaurant and Bar".
