= Silas Kelly =

American football player (born 1998)

No. 29
- Position: Linebacker

Personal information
- Born: March 19, 1998 (age 28); Mount Airy, Maryland, U.S.
- Listed height: 6 ft 4 in (1.93 m)
- Listed weight: 229 lb (104 kg)

Career information
- High school: South Carroll (Carroll County, Maryland)
- College: Coastal Carolina (2016–2021)
- NFL draft: 2022: undrafted

Career history
- Cleveland Browns (2022)*; St. Louis Battlehawks (2023); Seattle Sea Dragons (2024)*
- * Offseason or practice squad member only

Awards and highlights
- Mayo Clinic Comeback Player of the Year Award (2020); Second-team All-Sun Belt (2020); First-team All-Sun Belt (2021)

Silas Kelly (born March 19, 1998) is an American former football linebacker. He played college football at Coastal Carolina and signed with the Cleveland Browns as an undrafted free agent in 2022.

== Early life ==
Kelly grew up in Mount Airy, Maryland and attended South Carroll High School. He was rated a two-star recruit and originally committed to play college football at Maryland but instead committed to play college football at Coastal Carolina.

== College career ==
Kelly was redshirted during his true freshman season in 2016 and was named the Chant Squad MVP twice. During the 2017 season, he played in 11 games and started 10 of them. He finished the season with 75 total tackles (39 solo stops and 36 assisted), 5.5 tackles for loss for 14 yards, 1.5 sacks for six yards and one pass breakup. He was named the team's Defensive MVP after his performance against Georgia Southern. During the 2018 season, he played in 11 games and started 10 of them at linebacker. He finished the season with 60 total tackles (31 solo stops and 29 assisred), three tackles for loss for 17 yards, one sack for nine yards, three pass breakups and one fumble recovery. During the 2019 season, he played in only two games before suffering an injury which ultimately had him sit out for the rest of the season. He finished the season with 15 recorded tackles (11 solo stops and four assisted), 1.0 tackle for loss and a forced fumble. During the 2020 season, he played in all 12 games and started 11 of them. He finished the season with 80 recorded tackles (39 solo stops and 41 assisted), 6.5 tackle for loss for 30 yards, five sacks for 25 yards, one interception, one pass breakup and one fumble recovery. He was named the Sun Belt defensive player of the week after his performance against Campbell. He was also the Mayo Clinic Comeback Player of the Year Award winner being one of three winners nationally. During the 2021 season, he played in and started all 13 games as the team's captain. He finished the season with 110 total tackles (40 solo stops and 70 assisted), 8.5 tackles for loss for 30 yards, 2.5 sacks for 19 yards, one interception, three pass breakups and one forced fumble.

== Professional career ==
Pre-draft measurables
Height	Weight	Arm length	Hand span	40-yard dash	10-yard split	20-yard split	20-yard shuttle	Three-cone drill	Vertical jump	Broad jump
6 ft 3 3/4 in (1.92 m)	229 lb (104 kg)	31 1/2 in (0.80 m)	9 3/4 in (0.25 m)	4.64 s	1.62 s	2.64 s	4.47 s	7.46 s	38.5 in (0.98 m)	10 ft 3 in (3.12 m)
All values from NFL Combine/Pro Day

=== Cleveland Browns ===
On May 13, 2022, after going undrafted in the 2022 NFL draft, Kelly signed with the Cleveland Browns as an undrafted free agent. He was waived on August 9, 2022, with an injury designation.

=== St. Louis Battlehawks ===
On November 17, 2022, Kelly was selected by the St. Louis Battlehawks in the 2023 XFL draft.

=== Seattle Sea Dragons ===
On July 9, 2023, Kelly was traded to the Seattle Sea Dragons in exchange for fullback Charlie Taumoepeau. The Sea Dragons folded when the XFL and USFL merged to create the United Football League (UFL).
