= Natasha Gajewski =

American CEO and app developer

- Born: Natasha Rana
- Education: Rutgers University (BA)
- Occupations: CEO; Director; Business Owner
- Spouse: Mark Gajewski
- Children: 2
- Relatives: Christopher Emery (stepbrother); Richard Kind (stepbrother)
- Honors: TedMED Frontline Scholar, Stanford MedX ePatient Scholar

Natasha Gajewski (née Rana) is the CEO and founder of Symple Health.

== Early life and education ==
Gajewski was born to Dana Roy and Riaz Hussein Rana. Her father, Rana, was a commercial pilot and later statistician. Rana immigrated to the United States from Zafar Chowk, Pakistan, in 1960. Gajewski has one sister, Holly Bossard. Gajewski has a Bachelor of Arts in Economics and Statistics from Rutgers University.

== Career ==
After being diagnosed in 2010 with the rare condition mixed connective tissue disease (MTCD), Gajewski was told by her physician to keep track of her symptoms between medical appointments. This motivated her to improve health prospects for patients. This led to the idea to create a mobile symptom journal. Gajewski was initially faced with the prohibitive costs of developing a mobile app after approaching developers from the United States and India. To evaluate the feasibility and validity of the app, she attended Eric Ries's 2011 Lean startup – San Francisco where her idea was the second-place winner and was voted "most fundable" and "most likely to succeed." In a February 2017 Heart Sisters interview, Gajewksi said of her experience designing a mobile app:

But there wasn't [already a mobile app], so I went about making my own. Because I was actively sick at the time, I knew certain things that a healthy person might completely miss – something as simple as not using sliders on a screen because they're harder to activate (and require more thought) than a button.

She has been described as a "revolutionary" in the engaged patient movement along with Dave deBronkart and Jamie Heywood. In 2014, the Symple App had 60,000 users. It is distributed through the iOS App Store. In 2016, Symple was recommended by a National Health Service general practitioner, Dr. Golda Parker, for patients to use to create lists of symptoms so they come prepared to appointments. Gajewski's Symple app has been the subject of research in academic journals. A 2017 academic study rated her mobile app as one of the "highest performing apps" for heart failure monitoring. Gajewski provided input on point of care patient decisions in a 2016 study. Danny Gorog of Macworld had positive remarks on the app, stating that it "is a powerful iPhone app that lets users track up to 20 different symptoms at once. It also functions as a health diary, to let you note the things you eat, daily exercise and medications you take."

== Advisory boards ==
Gajewski serves as an Advisor for Princeton University's Keller Center eLab Summer Accelerator. She is also a member of University of California, San Diego and Irvine's Health Data Exploration Project. In December 2011, Gajewski was one of the Princeton alumni and women entrepreneurs and business leaders who served as a panelist for the event entitled "Women in Entrepreneurship" hosted by the Keller Center. The panel explored the underrepresentation of women in venture capital and startup ventures to which Gajewski reported, "I just never imagined limitations based on my sex," later remarking, "It just never occurred to me." Gajewski is a faculty member for the Robert Wood Johnson Foundation sponsored National Health Care Transparency Summit. Gajewski serves on the Advisory Board of Flip the Clinic, a project of the Robert Wood Johnson Foundation.

== Personal life ==
Gajewski resides in Princeton, New Jersey. To combat her autoimmune disease, Gajewski practices Zumba. Gajewski's parents later divorced, and her father remarried Jacqueline Nicole Marchal of Paris, through which, Gajewski gained three step-siblings including Christopher Emery. Gajewski's mother remarried jeweler Samuel Kind, through which, she gained two step-siblings, actor and voice actor Richard Kind and Joanne Hinton.

== Awards and recognition ==
- TedMED Frontline scholar
- "1 of 10 Innovators to Follow" - Partners HealthCare Center for Connected Health
- 2013 Stanford MedX ePatient scholar
- Member - Startup Health Showcase, mHealth Summit, Washington, D.C.
- Competition winners - Lean startup, Eric Ries, IMVU, and Thomas Eisenmann of the Harvard Business School

== See also ==
- mHealth
