= Blair Grubb =

American physician and academic

Blair P. Grubb
- Born: January 21, 1954 (age 72); Baltimore
- Education: Universidad Central del Este (MD)

Blair P. Grubb is an American physician, surgeon, researcher and scientist, currently a Distinguished University Professor of Medicine, Pediatrics and Neurology at the University of Toledo. He is well known for his contributions to the study of syncope and disorders of the autonomic nervous system (in particular postural orthostatic tachycardia syndrome).

== Early life and education ==
Grubb was born in Baltimore, Maryland, on January 21, 1954, and grew up in the then rural Carroll County of Maryland. The son of an electrician, he grew up in very modest surroundings and began working full-time as an electrician and sign maker starting at the age of 14 years, and continued to do so until his mid-twenties. He graduated from South Carroll High School in 1972, and later earned a BA in biologic sciences from the University of Maryland, Baltimore County (UMBC) in 1976. He earned a Medical degree from the Universidad Central del Este in the Dominican Republic in 1980. He then completed a medical residency at the Greater Baltimore Medical Center, where he also served as chief medical resident. While doing a rotation in cardiology at the Johns Hopkins Hospital he became interested in cardiac electrophysiology after watching some of the first human defibrillator implants. He thereafter completed fellowships in both cardiology and clinical cardiac electrophysiology at the Pennsylvania State University's Milton S. Hershey Medical Center in Hershey, Pennsylvania.

== Career ==
Grubb joined the faculty of the Medical College of Ohio (later renamed the University of Toledo Medical Center) as an assistant professor of medicine in 1988, where he initiated the institution's cardiac electrophysiology program. He became an associate professor of medicine and pediatrics in 1993, and was elevated to a full professor of medicine and pediatrics in 1999.

Grubb is widely known for his research into the pathophysiology, diagnosis and management of syncope. He was among the first researchers in the United States to employ head upright tilt table testing for the diagnosis of vasovagal (neurocardiogenic) syncope. He is also widely considered one of the world's leading experts on postural orthostatic tachycardia syndrome (POTS) and orthostatic hypotension. He has also pioneered new wound closure techniques designed to reduce infection rates and enhance wound appearance during permanent pacemaker and implantable defibrillator surgeries. He has also been a principal investigator in using permanent pacemakers with closed loop stimulation capacity (CLS) in the treatment of refractory neurocardiogenic/vasovagal syncope. His current focus of research is in exploring the role of autoimmunity in the pathogenesis of POTS and other autonomic disorders. He recently has also been investigating the potential role of autoimmunity in patients suffering from long COVID. He has authored over 300 peer-reviewed scientific papers and 34 book chapters. He is co-editor of the textbook Syncope: Mechanisms and Management and the author of the book The Fainting Phenomenon. He was a senior editor of the journal Pacing and Clinical Electrophysiology for 25 years. He is currently the director of the Cardiac Electrophysiology Program and the Syncope and Autonomic Disorders Clinic at the University of Toledo Medical Center (UTMC) in Toledo, Ohio. He is also the director of the Autonomic Disorders Fellowship training program at UTMC.

Grubb has also published numerous essays on his experiences as a physician and patient, a collection of which were published as a book entitled The Calling. He has also published a number of poems.

== Personal life ==
Grubb was married to the late Barbara Straus MD for 38 years. He is currently married to Dr. Dena Eber PhD. He has two children, Helen and Alex, and one stepchild, Alex.

== Awards and accolades ==
He has also received numerous awards throughout his career and received UMBC's Distinguished Alumnus Award in 1994, and was elected to the Alpha Omega Alpha (AOA) medical honor society in 1997. Grubb was presented with the Northwest Ohio American Heart Associations' "Legacy of Achievement" Award in 2001. He was named as a Distinguished University Professor by the University of Toledo (UT) in 2009. He was given the Leonard Tow Humanism in Medicine Award in 2006. He received the University's Dean's Award for Career Achievement in 2016 as well as the University's Outstanding Research and Scholarship Award in 2017. Grubb received Dysautonomia International's "Physician of the Year" Award in 2015. That same year the British Arrhythmia Alliance named him "Medical Professional of the Decade". Also in 2015 he was recognized by the Ohio State Senate for outstanding research and clinical practice naming him "One of Ohio's finest citizens". In 2017 he received the Dion D. Raftopoulos/Sigma Xi Honor Society Award for outstanding original research. In 2018 he was given the University of Toledo's President's Award for Outstanding Contributions in Scholarship and Creative Activity. In 2019 he received the "Revolutionary Researcher Award" by the Dysautonomia Support Network. In 2020 he was awarded the University of Toledo Medical Center's "Shining Star Award" for outstanding patient care. Also in 2020 UT presented him with the "Blair P. Grubb Endowed Chair in Syncope and Arrhythmias", one of the highest honors the University can bestow upon a faculty member. In 2021, 2022 and 2024 he again received UT's President's Award for Creative and Scholarly Activity. In 2024 he was given a joint appointment in Neurology in recognition of his contributions to Autonomic Neuroscience. Grubb has been recognized as one of "America's Top Doctors" for 20 years in a row. He is a Fellow of the American College of Cardiology and a Fellow of the American Heart Association as well as a member of the Heart Rhythm Society and the American Autonomic Society.
