= Sykesville Historic District =

Historic district in Maryland, United States

- U.S. National Register of Historic Places
- U.S. Historic district
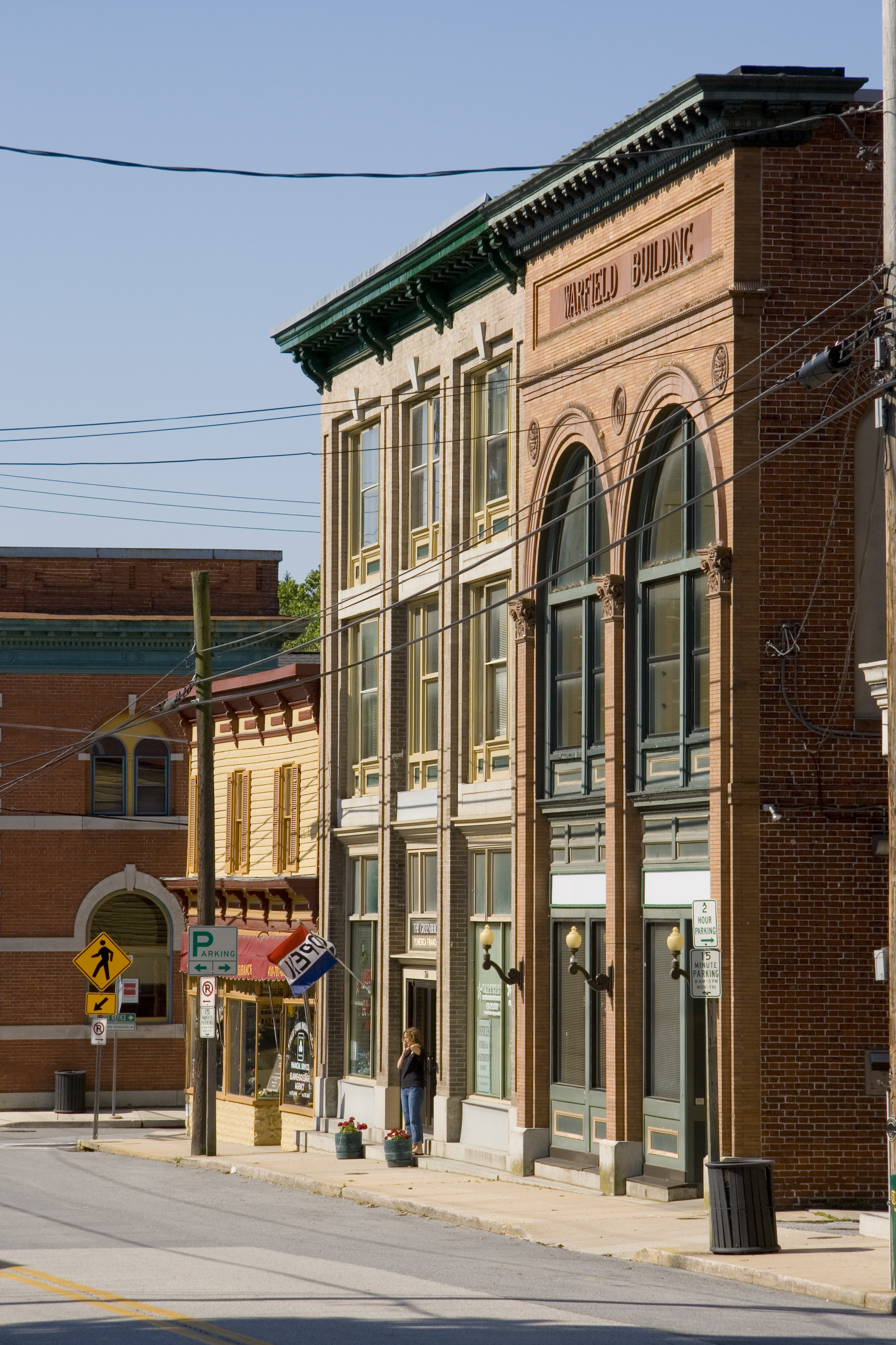

- Location within Maryland Location within the United States
- Location: Main St., Springfield, Norwood & Mellor Aves., Sykesville, Maryland
- Coordinates: 39°22′5″N 76°58′9″W
- Area: 65 acres (26 ha)
- Built: 1850
- Architect: Baldwin, E. Francis
- Architectural style: Colonial Revival, Bungalow/craftsman, Queen Anne
- NRHP reference No.: 85002498
- Added to NRHP: September 25, 1985

The Sykesville Historic District encompasses the center of Sykesville, Maryland. Sykesville is a small incorporated town in the Patapsco River valley in southern Carroll County, Maryland, and is located on the old main line of the Baltimore and Ohio Railroad (B&O), one of the first railroad lines in the United States, that section dating from 1831. The B&O train station is included in the district, next to the river. It was designed by E. Francis Baldwin in the Queen Anne style and built in 1883. It is currently a restaurant having outdoor seating on the original platform (only goods trains now pass). Other historically significant buildings in the district were built between the 1850s and the 1920s.

== See also ==
- Salopha (Sykesville, Maryland)
