= Howard Lodge =

Historic house in Maryland, United States

- U.S. National Register of Historic Places
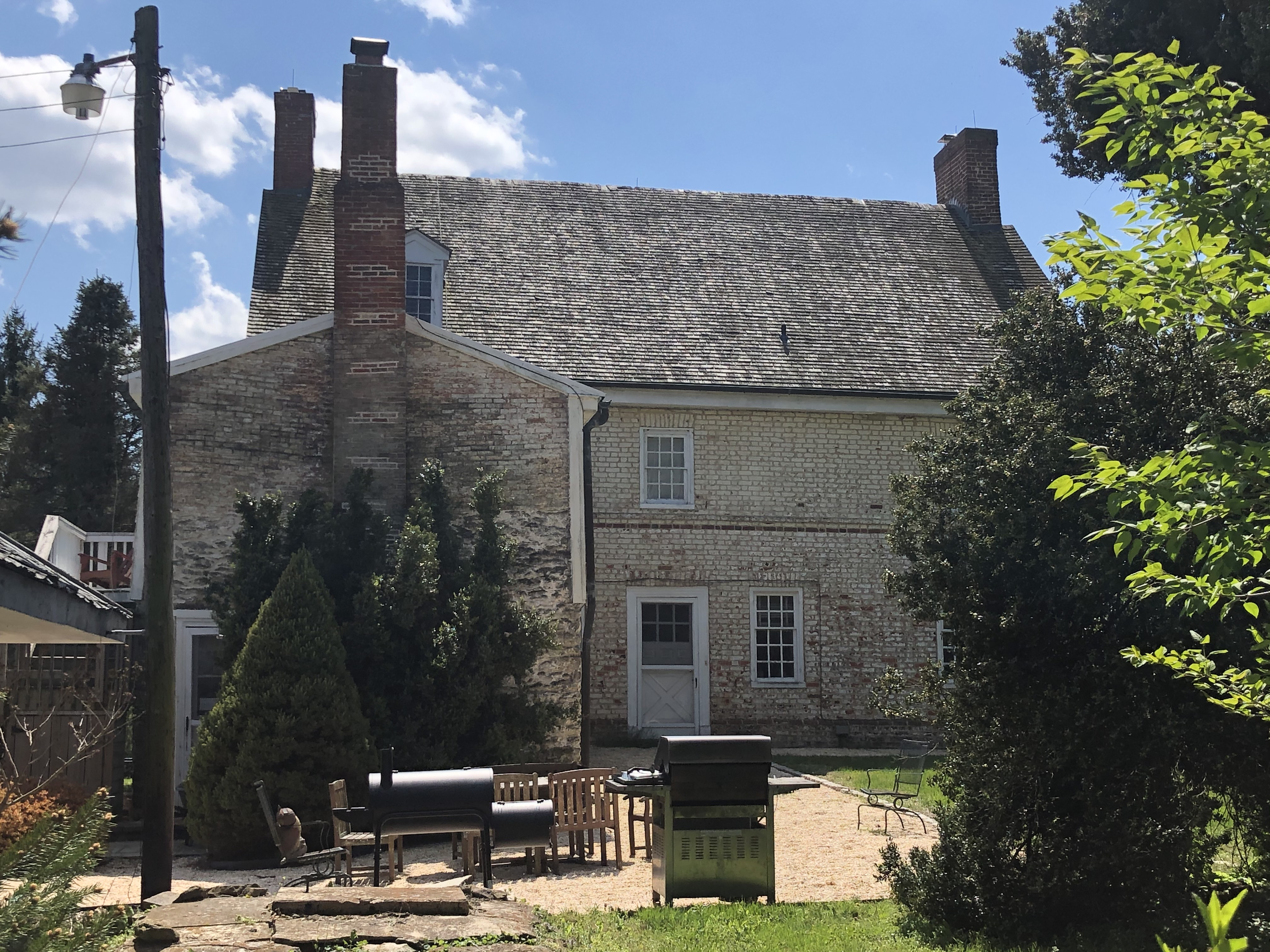

- Location within Maryland Location within the United States
- Location: 12301 Howard Lodge Road, near Sykesville, Maryland
- Coordinates: 39°20′14″N 76°56′23″W
- Area: 15 acres (6.1 ha)
- Built: c. 1750
- Architectural style: Georgian
- NRHP reference No.: 12000845
- Added to NRHP: October 9, 2012

Howard Lodge is a historic plantation house in north-central Howard County, Maryland. The main house, built around 1750 by Edward Dorsey, son of John Dorsey, is one of the oldest plantation houses in the county. Compared to other houses of the period, the two-story brick and stone structure is larger and its interior finishes better preserved. The surviving plantation property, about 15 acres (6.1 ha), also includes early 19th-century stone outbuildings. Edward Dorsey was given ownership of seven African-American slaves by his father John Dorsey.

The property was listed on the National Register of Historic Places in 2012.

== See also ==
- National Register of Historic Places listings in Howard County, Maryland
- List of Howard County properties in the Maryland Historical Trust
