= Salopha (Sykesville, Maryland) =

- Location within Maryland
- 39°21′10″N 76°56′45″W
- Location: 691 River Road Sykesville, Maryland

History
- Built: 1718

Site notes
- Architectural style: Log

Salopha or Solopha is a historic plantation house located in Sykesville, Howard County, Maryland.

Salopha is a historic house, farm and bank barn. The farm house is built around a log house constructed in 1718 that predates the land grant patented to John Johnson in September 18, 1742. In 1762 Vachel Dorsey expanded the structure. The property was purchased in 1829 by Charles Alexander Warfield for $2,400 (~$79,460 in 2024). In 1889 the house was modified in a Gothic revival style. The home is the birthplace of former Carroll County commissioner Joshua Warfield Dorsey Sr. The bank barn built by the Warfield brothers in 1889 burned in 1972.

== See also ==
- Sykesville Historic District
