= Sykesville, Maryland =

- Town
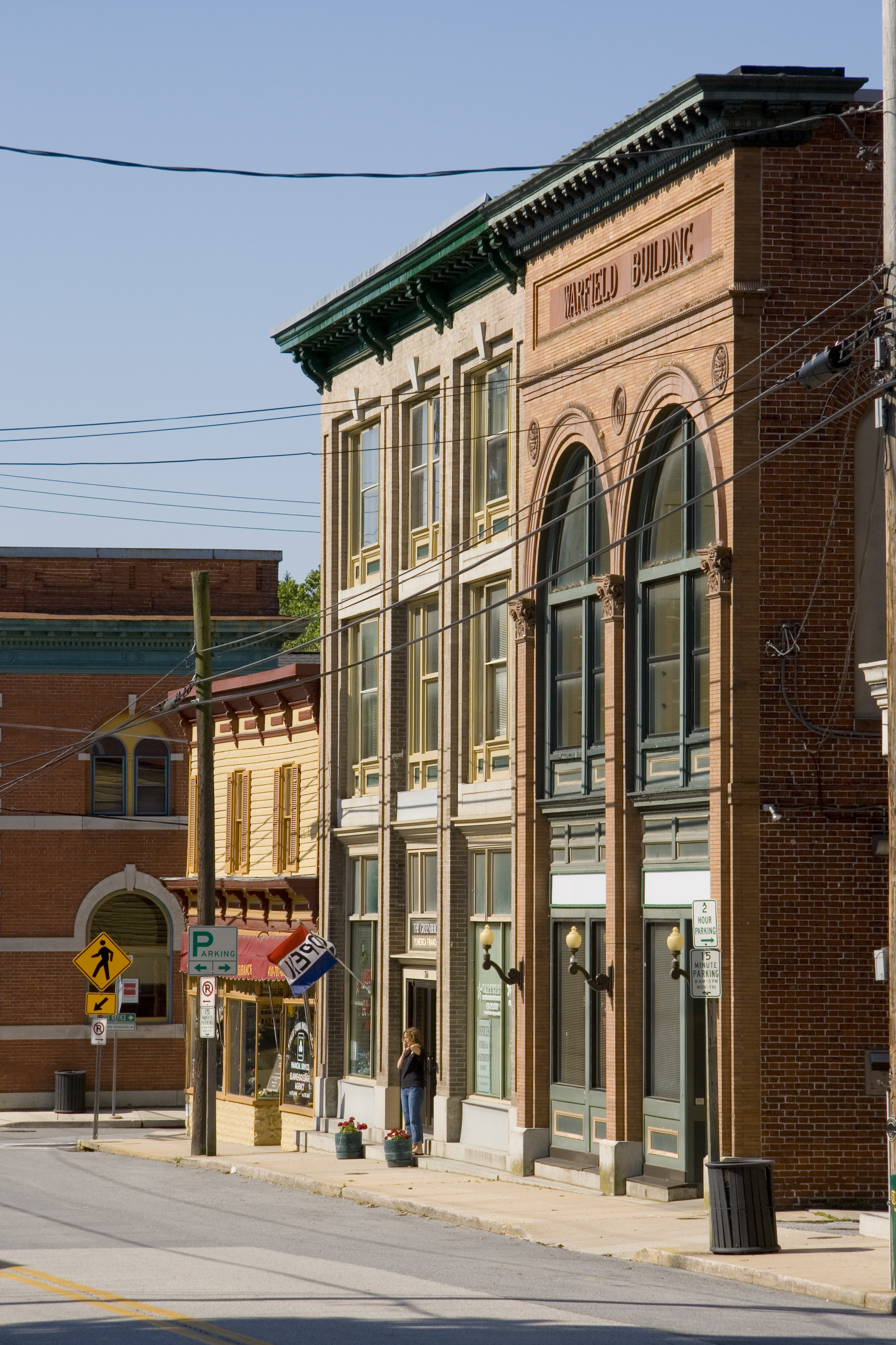
- Main Street in the Sykesville Historic District

- Flag Seal

- Location of Sykesville, Maryland
- Coordinates: 39°22′16″N 76°58′21″W
- Country: United States
- State: Maryland
- County: Carroll and Howard
- Incorporated: May 3, 1904

Government
  - Mayor: Stacy Link (2021- present)

Area
  - Total: 1.59 sq mi (4.11 km^{2})
  - Land: 1.58 sq mi (4.10 km^{2})
  - Water: 0.0039 sq mi (0.01 km^{2})
- Elevation: 545 ft (166 m)

Population (2020)
  - Total: 4,316
  - Density: 2,727.3/sq mi (1,053.03/km^{2})
- Time zone: UTC-5 (Eastern (EST))
  - Summer (DST): UTC-4 (EDT)
- ZIP code: 21784
- Area codes: 410, 443, and 667
- FIPS code: 24-76550
- GNIS feature ID: 0591389
- Website: www.townofsykesville.gov

Sykesville is a small town in Howard and Carroll counties, Maryland, United States. The town lies 20 miles (32 km) west of Baltimore and 40 miles (64 km) north of Washington D.C. As of the 2020 census, Sykesville had a population of 4,316.

== History ==
Prior to European colonization, the area that is now Sykesville was used as a hunting ground by Native Americans from the Susquehannock and Lenape nations. By the late 1800s, many Europeans (predominantly from Germany and Scotland) had settled in Sykesville in pursuit of farming and mining.

The land on which Sykesville sits started out as part of the 3,000-acre (12 km^{2}) Springfield Estate, a slave plantation owned by wealthy Baltimore shipbuilder William Patterson. In 1803, Patterson's daughter Elizabeth, married Napoléon Bonaparte's younger brother Jérôme, but when she arrived in Europe as Jérôme's bride, Napoléon refused the marriage of the two, and would not let Elizabeth set foot on France's soil. He was determined that Jerome marry into royalty, and sent Elizabeth back home. Denied by Napoléon, she was never able to see her husband again, leaving her to raise their son alone in the United States. Upon the death of William in 1824, his son George Patterson inherited the estate. In 1825, George Patterson sold 1,000 acres (4.0 km^{2}; 1.6 sq mi) of Springfield Estate to his friend and business associate, James Sykes.

A tract of land on the Howard County side of the Patapsco River contained an old saw and grist mill. In 1830 Sykes replaced it with a newer mill and constructed a five-story stone hotel, to take care of railroad personnel and the tourist trade. In 1831 the Baltimore and Ohio Railroad (B&O) extended its main line to "Horse Train Stop", since Sykesville had yet to be named. Other businesses moved into the area, including two general stores, new mills, churches and a post office. In 1832 the town managed to gain control of a barn across the Patapsco River, the dividing line between Carroll and Howard County, but the citizens were forced to return the barn under threat of federal troops.

Much of the town was destroyed by a flood in 1868, ending a water rights dispute between the Sykesville mill and the Elba Furnace when both were damaged. The town was rebuilt on the Carroll County side of the river.

The town was incorporated in 1904. A weekly newspaper, the Sykesville Herald, was founded in 1913 and published regularly until the 1980s.

== Geography ==
Sykesville is located at 39°22′16″N 76°58′21″W (39.371020, -76.972630).

According to the United States Census Bureau, the town has a total area of 1.58 square miles (4.09 km^{2}), all land.

== Demographics ==
Historical population
Census	Pop.	Note	%±
1910	565		—
1920	610		8.0%
1930	661		8.4%
1940	806		21.9%
1950	941		16.7%
1960	1,196		27.1%
1970	1,399		17.0%
1980	1,712		22.4%
1990	2,303		34.5%
2000	4,197		82.2%
2010	4,436		5.7%
2020	4,316		−2.7%
U.S. Decennial Census

=== 2020 census ===
As of the 2020 census, Sykesville had a population of 4,316. The median age was 39.4 years. 21.7% of residents were under the age of 18 and 14.1% of residents were 65 years of age or older. For every 100 females there were 97.9 males, and for every 100 females age 18 and over there were 94.4 males age 18 and over.

98.5% of residents lived in urban areas, while 1.5% lived in rural areas.

There were 1,648 households in Sykesville, of which 34.2% had children under the age of 18 living in them. Of all households, 53.0% were married-couple households, 15.8% were households with a male householder and no spouse or partner present, and 24.5% were households with a female householder and no spouse or partner present. About 24.7% of all households were made up of individuals and 11.1% had someone living alone who was 65 years of age or older.

There were 1,716 housing units, of which 4.0% were vacant. The homeowner vacancy rate was 1.0% and the rental vacancy rate was 6.7%.

Racial composition as of the 2020 census
Race	Number	Percent
White	3,559	82.5%
Black or African American	251	5.8%
American Indian and Alaska Native	8	0.2%
Asian	195	4.5%
Native Hawaiian and Other Pacific Islander	0	0.0%
Some other race	38	0.9%
Two or more races	265	6.1%
Hispanic or Latino (of any race)	180	4.2%

=== 2010 census ===
As of the census of 2010, there were 4,436 people, 1,409 households, and 995 families residing in the town. The population density was 2,807.6 inhabitants per square mile (1,084.0/km^{2}). There were 1,474 housing units at an average density of 932.9 per square mile (360.2/km^{2}). The racial makeup of the town was 83.3% White, 12.1% African American, 0.2% Native American, 2.5% Asian, 0.2% from other races, and 1.6% from two or more races. Hispanic or Latino of any race were 2.7% of the population. Most Hispanics and Latinos in the town identify as White, with 2% of Sykesville's total population identifying as White Hispanics/Latinos. Non-Hispanics in Sykesville are predominantly White, with 81.3% of the town's total population being non-Hispanic whites. 11.9 of Sykesville is non-Hispanic African-American, less than 1% being Afro-Latino.

There were 1,409 households, of which 45.0% had children under the age of 18 living with them, 55.3% were married couples living together, 10.6% had a female householder with no husband present, 4.8% had a male householder with no wife present, and 29.4% were non-families. 23.7% of all households were made up of individuals, and 6.6% had someone living alone who was 65 years of age or older. The average household size was 2.72 and the average family size was 3.27.

The median age in the town was 37.3 years. 26.1% of residents were under the age of 18; 8.1% were between the ages of 18 and 24; 30.9% were from 25 to 44; 27.8% were from 45 to 64; and 7.1% were 65 years of age or older. The gender makeup of the town was 54.6% male and 45.4% female.

=== 2000 census ===
As of the census of 2000, there were 4,197 people, 1,390 households, and 1,025 families residing in the town. The population density was 2,621.1 inhabitants per square mile (1,012.0/km^{2}). There were 1,420 housing units at an average density of 886.8 per square mile (342.4/km^{2}). The racial makeup of the town was 92.14% White, 4.88% African American, 0.14% Native American, 1.62% Asian, 0.02% from other races, and 1.19% from two or more races. Hispanic or Latino of any race were 1.33% of the population. 28% of Sykesville's residents were German, 19% Irish, 13% English, 7% Italian, 3% Polish, 2% Scotch-Irish, and 2% Russian. People of Dutch, Greek, Welsh, French, Scottish, Swiss, Lithuanian, Indian, Korean and Mexican descent each comprised 1% of the population.

There were 1,390 households, out of which 48.6% had children under the age of 18 living with them, 59.7% were married couples living together, 10.8% had a female householder with no husband present, and 26.2% were non-families. 20.4% of all households were made up of individuals, and 3.8% had someone living alone who was 65 years of age or older. The average household size was 2.84 and the average family size was 3.33.

In the town, the population was spread out, with 32.0% under the age of 18, 5.1% from 18 to 24, 37.8% from 25 to 44, 15.7% from 45 to 64, and 9.3% who were 65 years of age or older. The median age was 34 years. For every 100 females, there were 90.9 males. For every 100 females age 18 and over, there were 86.9 males.

The median income for a household in the town was $66,551, and the median income for a family was $75,758. Males had a median income of $50,146 versus $35,669 for females. The per capita income for the town was $24,395. About 2.4% of families and 3.5% of the population were below the poverty line, including 3.6% of those under age 18 and 8.7% of those age 65 or over.

== Sites of interest ==
The ex-Baltimore and Ohio Railroad's Sykesville station was designed by E. Francis Baldwin in the Queen Anne style and built in 1883. The station was the second stop from Baltimore on the original B&O main line. The B&O ended passenger service to Sykesville in 1949. It was the prototype for a well-known model railroad kit.

The Sykesville Schoolhouse Museum, at 518 Schoolhouse Road, served as a one-room schoolhouse for black children from 1904 to 1938. Although restoration isn't complete, the museum is open for small events.

The Gate House Museum of History, at 7283 Cooper Drive, served as residence for many employees at Maryland's second hospital for the insane. The hospital opened in 1896 and the gatehouse opened in 1904.

The Springfield Hospital Center mental institution is located to the east of the town.

Downtown Sykesville comprises the Sykesville Historic District. At two separate points in time, Union and Confederate Armies marched through the town center.

On the Howard County side - The Howard Lodge (ca. 1750) was the centerpiece of a 2,500 acre slave plantation built for the Dorsey family. The building was once home to Francis Scott Key Jr.

== Transportation ==
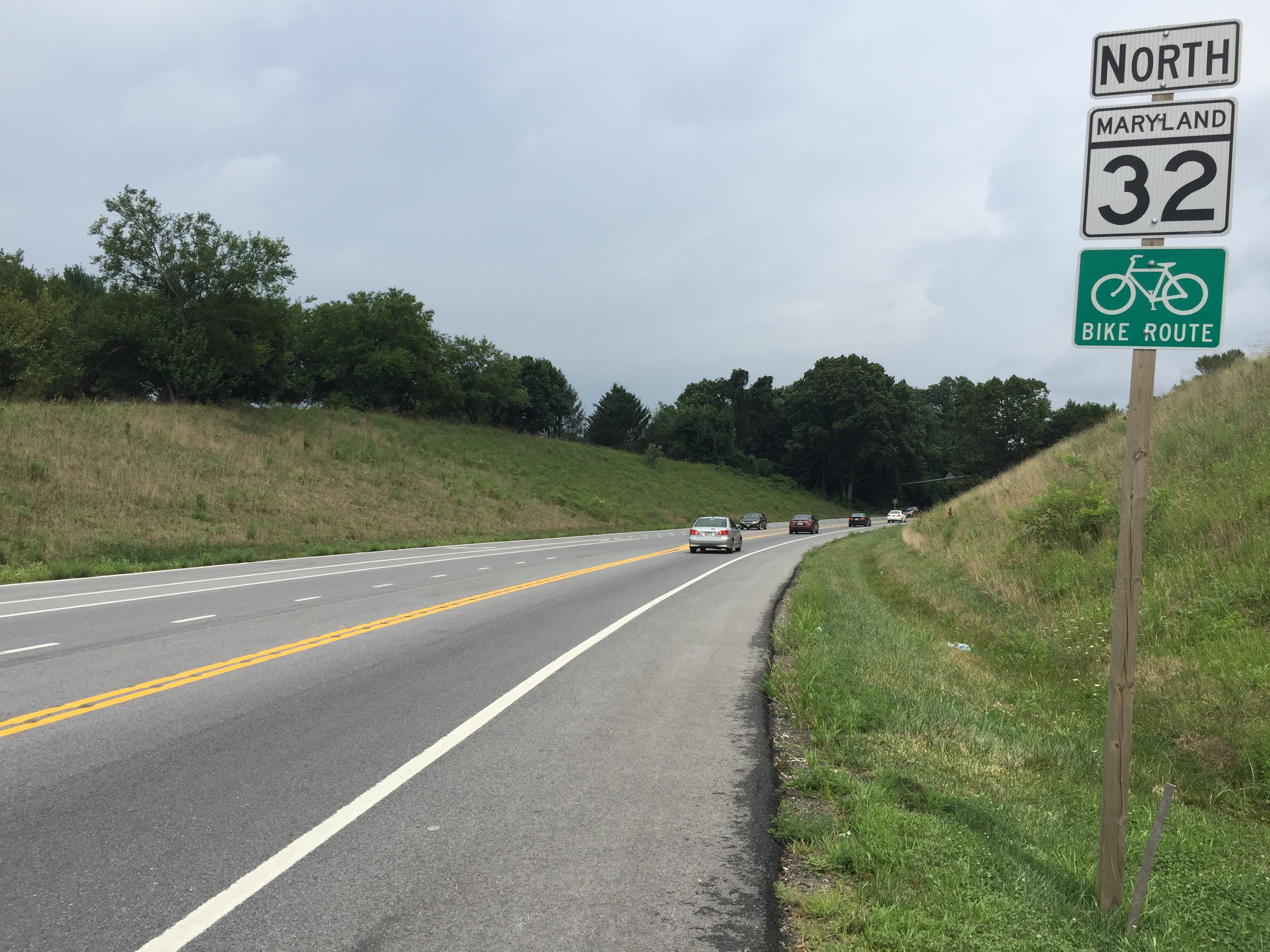
MD 32 in Sykesville

The primary method of travel to and from Sykesville is by road, and the main highway serving the town is Maryland Route 32. From Sykesville, MD 32 continues northward to Westminster. In the opposite direction, MD 32 heads south, then curves east, eventually approaching Annapolis. En route, MD 32 interchanges with Interstate 70, Interstate 95 and Interstate 97. The current route of MD 32 through Sykesville is a newer bypass, with the original road now designated Maryland Route 851 through central Sykesville.

The Carroll Transit System runs the South Carroll TrailBlazer (Red Route), which links Sykesville to Eldersburg. The Owings Mills station of the Baltimore Metro SubwayLink in nearby Owings Mills in Baltimore County, is a 20-minute drive by car from Sykesville and provides subway access to downtown Baltimore.

== Notable people ==
- Frank Brown — 42nd Governor of Maryland
- Christopher Emery — Chief Enterprise Architect of the U.S. Securities and Exchange Commission and former White House Usher; lived in the Howard Lodge as a child
- Leo Kanner — child psychiatrist and autism researcher, died there on April 3, 1981
- Nan Agle — author of children's books, died at the age of 100 at her home in Sykesville
- Brandon Copeland — defensive end, played seven seasons in the NFL
- Kyle Snyder — 2016 Olympic gold medalist wrestler at 97 kg, attended Sykesville Middle School
- Barry Fitzgerald — stock car racing driver, born in Sykesville

== See also ==
- Sykesville Historic District
- South Branch Park
- Salopha (Sykesville, Maryland)
