= List of Gotham (franchise) characters =

Main and recurring characters of Gotham season 1. From left to right in the upper row: James Gordon, Harvey Bullock, Bruce Wayne, Selina Kyle, Sarah Essen, Barbara Kean, and Alfred Pennyworth. From left to right in the lower row: Oswald Cobblepot, Fish Mooney, Carmine Falcone, Edward Nygma, Ivy Pepper, Renee Montoya, and Crispus Allen

The Gotham franchise is a media franchise and shared fictional universe that is the setting of television series, novels, and comic book series developed by Bruno Heller and Danny Cannon, produced by DC Entertainment and based on characters that appear in DC Comics publications. The franchise began with the American crime television series Gotham, based on characters (primarily James "Jim" Gordon and Bruce Wayne / Batman) appearing in DC's Batman franchise.

Gotham, starring Ben McKenzie as a young Gordon, premiered in the United States on September 22, 2014 on the Fox television network and concluded on April 25, 2019 after five seasons. Heller and Cannon next developed Pennyworth, a spin-off prequel series to Gotham starring Jack Bannon as a younger incarnation of Gotham's Alfred Pennyworth. Pennyworth aired for two seasons on Epix from July 28, 2019 to April 11, 2021. A third season, also loosely adapting V for Vendetta, aired on HBO Max from October 6 to November 24, 2022.

As originally conceived, Gotham would have served as a straightforward story of Gordon's early days on the Gotham City Police Department. The idea eventually evolved to not only include Wayne's "transformation" into Batman but also to explore the origin stories of several of his villains such as Penguin, Riddler, and Catwoman. Pennyworth similarly explores Pennyworth's early life during the British Civil War, as he and Americans Thomas Wayne and Martha Kane seek to prevent the fascist Raven Society from overtaking the British government.

In addition to directly adapted characters from DC Comics, many other characters in the show are based on, inspired by, or otherwise references to preexisting characters (though they may not be identical to these original sources).

== Overview ==
= Main cast (credited)
= Recurring cast (4+)
= Guest cast (1–3)

=== Main characters ===
Character	Portrayed by	Gotham					Pennyworth		
Character	Portrayed by	1	2	3	4	5	1	2	3
Main characters
Lt. / Captain / Commissioner James "Jim" Gordon	Ben McKenzie	Main	Main	Main	Main	Main			
Lt. Harvey Bullock	Donal Logue	Main	Main	Main	Main	Main			
Bruce Wayne / The Dark Knight	David Mazouz	Main	Main	Main	Main	Main			
Subject 514A / "Bruce Wayne"	David Mazouz		Main (Note: Subject 514A only appears in one episode of season two, although Mazouz is credited as a main cast member in "Transference", the season two finale.)	Main					
Captain Sarah Essen	Zabryna Guevara	Main (Note: Guevara is credited as a main cast member through "Knock, Knock", the second episode of season two.)	Main						
Alfred Pennyworth	Sean Pertwee	Main	Main	Main	Main	Main			
Alfred Pennyworth	Jack Bannon						Main	Main	Main
Oswald Cobblepot / The Penguin	Robin Lord Taylor	Main	Main	Main	Main	Main			
Barbara Kean	Erin Richards	Main	Main	Main	Main	Main			
Selina Kyle / Cat / Catwoman	Camren Bicondova	Main	Main	Main	Main	Main			
Selina Kyle / Cat / Catwoman	Lili Simmons					Guest			
Edward "Ed" Nygma / The Riddler	Cory Michael Smith	Main	Main	Main	Main	Main			
Renee Montoya	Victoria Cartagena	Main							
Crispus Allen	Andrew Stewart-Jones	Main							
Carmine Falcone	John Doman	Main	Guest	Recurring	Guest				
Fish Mooney	Jada Pinkett Smith	Main	Guest	Recurring					
Leslie "Lee" Thompkins	Morena Baccarin	Recurring	Main	Main	Main	Main			
Theo Galavan / Azrael	James Frain		Main			Photograph			
Tabitha Galavan / Tigress	Jessica Lucas		Main (Note: Lucas is credited as a main cast member through "Year Zero", the season five premiere.)	Main	Main	Main			
Lucius Fox	Chris Chalk	Guest	Main	Main	Main	Main			
Lucius Fox	Simon Manyonda							Recurring	Main
Cyrus Gold / Butch Gilzean / Solomon Grundy	Drew Powell	Recurring	Main	Main	Main				
Harvey Dent	Nicholas D'Agosto	Guest	Main						
Nathaniel Barnes / The Executioner	Michael Chiklis		Main	Main					
Basil Karlo / Virginia Devereaux / Clayface	Ben McKenzie		Main (Note: McKenzie portrays Karlo disguised as Gordon in the two-part season finale of season two: "A Legion of Horribles" and "Transference", credited as a main cast member.)						
Basil Karlo / Virginia Devereaux / Clayface	Brian McManamon		Guest	Guest					
Basil Karlo / Virginia Devereaux / Clayface	Paul Reubens			Guest					
Basil Karlo / Virginia Devereaux / Clayface	Lorraine Burroughs								Recurring
Ivy "Pamela" Pepper / Poison Ivy	Clare Foley	Recurring	Guest	Guest	Guest				
Ivy "Pamela" Pepper / Poison Ivy	Maggie Geha			Main	Guest				
Ivy "Pamela" Pepper / Poison Ivy	Peyton List				Recurring	Guest			
Jervis Tetch / Mad Hatter	Benedict Samuel			Main	Recurring	Guest			
Sofia Falcone	Crystal Reed				Main				
Ra's al Ghul	Alexander Siddig			Guest	Main				
Jerome Valeska	Cameron Monaghan	Guest	Guest	Guest	Starring				
Jeremiah Valeska / "J"	Cameron Monaghan				Starring	Starring			
Eduardo Dorrance / Bane	Shane West					Starring			
Nyssa al Ghul / Theresa Walker	Jaime Murray					Starring			
Thomas Wayne	Grayson McCouch	Guest				Guest			
Thomas Wayne	Ben Aldridge						Main	Main	Main
Martha Wayne (née Kane)	Brette Taylor	Guest				Guest			
Martha Wayne (née Kane)	Emma Paetz						Main	Main	Main
Deon "Bazza" Bashford	Hainsley Lloyd Bennett						Main	Main	
Wallace "Daveboy" McDougal	Ryan Fletcher						Main	Main	Main
Mary Pennyworth	Dorothy Atkinson						Main	Main	Main
Arthur Pennyworth	Ian Puleston-Davies						Main	Main	
Bet Sykes	Paloma Faith						Main	Main	Main
Margaret "Peggy" Sykes	Polly Walker						Main	Main	Main
Lord James Harwood	Jason Flemyng						Main	Main	
The Queen of England	Jessica Ellerby						Starring	Starring	
John Ripper / The Ripper	Danny Webb						Starring	Starring	
Detective Inspector / Prime Minister Victor Aziz	Ramon Tikaram						Recurring	Main	Main
Sandra Onslow	Harriet Slater						Recurring	Main	Main
Colonel John Salt	Edward Hogg							Main	Recurring
Katie Browning	Jessye Romeo							Main	
Captain Gulliver "Gully" Troy / Captain Blighty	James Purefoy							Main	Main
#Jason Lennon / Jason Skolimski / The Ogre	Milo Ventimiglia	Recurring							

=== Recurring characters ===
Character	Portrayed by	Gotham					Pennyworth
Character	Portrayed by	1	2	3	4	5	Pennyworth
Aubrey James	Richard Kind	Recurring	Guest	Guest		Guest	
Gertrude Kapelput	Carol Kane	Recurring	Recurring				
Sal Maroni	David Zayas	Recurring					
Jennifer Luree	Krista Braun	Guest	Recurring	Recurring	Recurring	Guest	
Alvarez	J.W. Cortes	Recurring	Recurring	Recurring	Recurring	Recurring	
Liza	Makenzie Leigh	Recurring					
Kristen Kringle	Chelsea Spack	Recurring	Recurring	Guest			
Isabella	Chelsea Spack			Recurring			
Gabe	Alex Corrado	Recurring	Recurring	Recurring			
Victor Zsasz	Anthony Carrigan	Recurring	Guest	Guest	Recurring	Recurring	
Commissioner Loeb	Peter Scolari	Recurring	Guest				
Reginald "Reggie" Payne	David O'Hara	Recurring					
Reginald "Reggie" Payne	James Lewis						Guest
Jonathan Crane / Scarecrow	Charlie Tahan	Guest			Guest		
Jonathan Crane / Scarecrow	David W. Thompson				Recurring	Guest	
Hugo Strange	BD Wong		Recurring	Recurring	Guest	Recurring	
Victor Fries / Mr. Freeze	Nathan Darrow		Recurring	Guest	Recurring		
Ethel Peabody	Tonya Pinkins		Recurring	Guest			
Bridgit Pike / Firefly	Michelle Veintimilla		Recurring		Guest		
Bridgit Pike / Firefly	Camila Perez			Guest	Guest		
Aaron Helzinger	Stink Fisher		Recurring				
Sal Martinez	Lucas Salvagno		Recurring				
Carl Pinkney	Ian Quinlan		Recurring				
Silver St. Cloud	Natalie Alyn Lind		Recurring				
Father Creel	Ron Rifkin		Recurring				
Kathryn Monroe	Kit Flanagan		Guest				
Kathryn Monroe	Leslie Hendrix			Recurring			
Mario Falcone	James Carpinello			Recurring			
Valerie Vale	Jamie Chung			Recurring			
Campos	Flora Diaz			Recurring			
Shaman / Sensei	Raymond J. Barry			Recurring			
Arthur Penn / Ventriloquist	Andrew Sellon				Recurring	Recurring	
Vanessa Harper	Kelcy Griffin				Recurring	Recurring	
Lazlo Valentin / Professor Pyg	Michael Cerveris				Recurring	Guest	
Lelia	Shiva Kalaiselvan				Recurring	Guest	
Cherry	Marina Benedict				Recurring		
Martin	Christopher Convery				Recurring		
Ecco	Francesca Root-Dodson				Guest	Recurring	

== Main characters ==
=== James Gordon ===
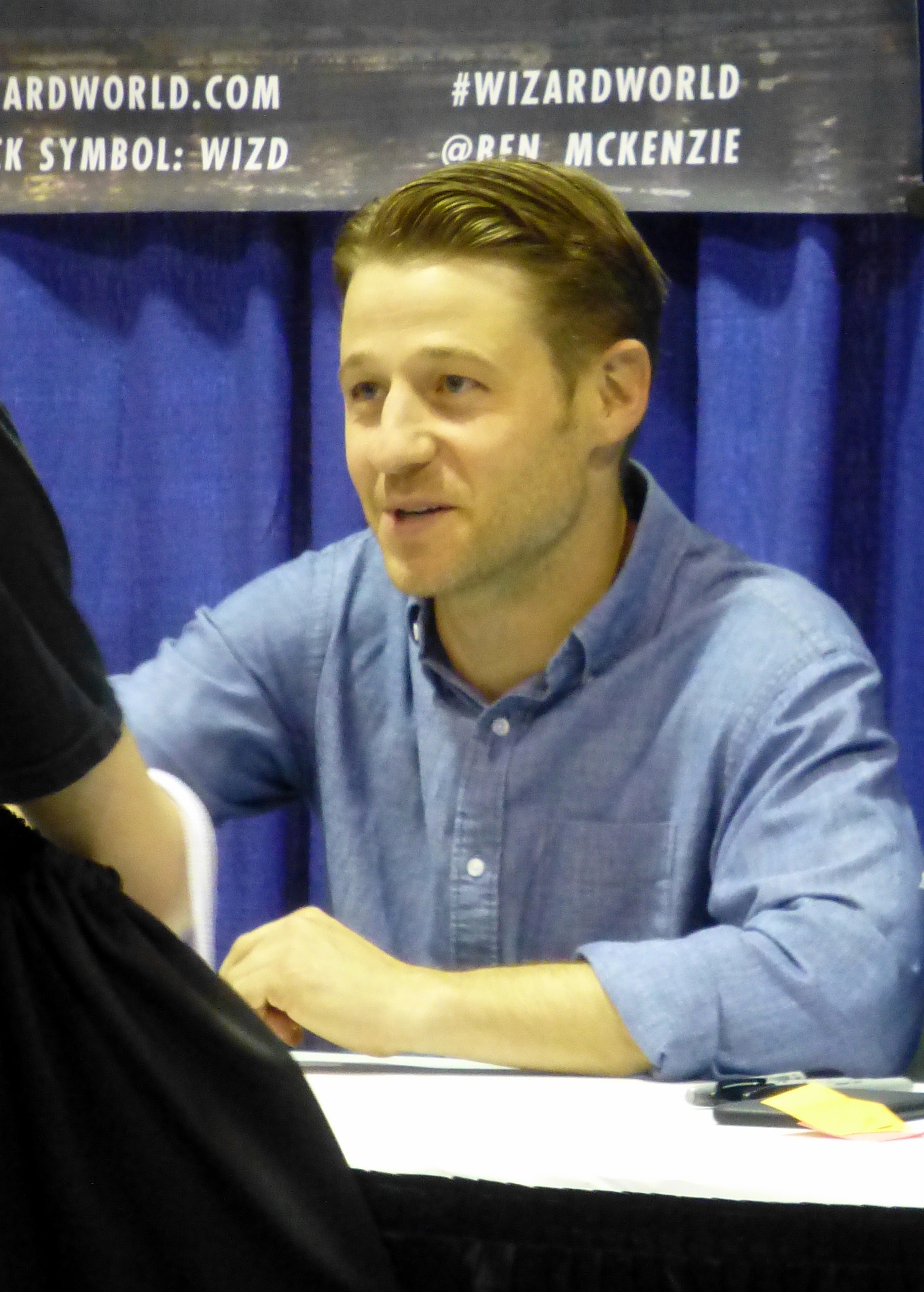
Ben McKenzie

James "Jim" Gordon (portrayed by Ben McKenzie; seasons 1–5) is a war veteran and homicide detective at the Gotham City Police Department in its 1st Grade working to find the man who killed Bruce Wayne's parents and battling the corruption of Gotham City's Police Department. His father was Gotham City's District Attorney before his death in a car accident when Gordon was 13 years old.

Fox began to develop a TV series centered on James Gordon's early days as a police detective and the origin stories of various Batman villains in September 2013. McKenzie was cast as the lead character. When describing his character in an interview, McKenzie stated that Gordon "is a truly honest man. The last honest man in a city full of crooked people. He's not an anti-hero, he's a true hero—but he will have to compromise". McKenzie did not audition for the role. Heller, with whom he had worked before, wrote the role for McKenzie, who described the character as "an old-fashioned hero in an age of anti-heroes. A throwback. Jim's a lawman, that restricts him in some ways. But also means he can become powerful within the system and change things for the better". In the show, Gordon is assigned to investigate the murder of Thomas and Martha Wayne, with Bruce being the surviving witness. During the first season, he is assigned with a new partner, Harvey Bullock, serving also to police captain Sarah Essen. In addition to the Wayne's murder case, Gordon solves various cases in Gotham, some of them which are connected to the powerful mob figures, like Fish Mooney, Carmine Falcone and Sal Maroni. Jim also fights against corruption in the GCPD, like the police commissioner Gillian B. Loeb and Narcotics Officer Arnold Flass. To better fight against criminals and corrupt cops, Gordon gets allies such as police detectives Renee Montoya and Crispus Allen and District Attorney Harvey Dent. Gordon soon becomes reluctant ally to a criminal named Oswald Cobblepot, often calling him for the favor in some cases. He also meets a small street thief Selina Kyle, who reluctantly helps him regarding the Wayne murders. At one point, when he is assigned to Arkham Asylum, he meets physician Leslie Thompkins who works in the female ward, later working as a medical examiner in GCPD. Gordon later falls in love with her; he was previously in a relationship with Barbara Kean, but due to his police duty and her life being put in danger by crime families, he advised her to temporarily leave him until they meet again. When Barbara sees Gordon and Leslie together, she becomes heartbroken and later psychotic. When the gang war reaches its climax, Gordon and Bullock attempt to save Carmine Falcone. He, Falcone, Oswald and Butch Gilzean are captured by Fish Mooney and her gang. When Sal Maroni advises her to join, calling her "babe", she shoots him. Gordon manages to end gang war, but Cobblepot kills Fish Mooney in her apparent death when she falls in the river, becoming a new king of Gotham.

Six months after the gang war, in the second season, Jim is fired by Loeb after scolding police cop Franks, in addition getting a revenge on him. He returned on duty thanks to Cobblepot who accepted to help him. Jim soon faces a criminal group The Maniax, led by Jerome Valeska, the latter killing a new police commissioner and a former captain Sarah Essen. After Jerome is killed by Galavan, he soon joins new commissioner Nathaniel Barnes in the creation of the GCPD unit Strike Force to better fight against crime, terrorism, and corruption in Gotham. Gordon later discovers that some cases are masterminded by a billionaire and mayor's candidate Theo Galavan and his sister Tabitha. Initially unaware of his schemes, Jim realizes this after Cobblepot tells him that his mother was captured and later killed when Oswald was coerced to work for them. He soon faces him and a religious group The Order of St. Dumas who intend to kill Bruce Wayne as a revenge for their injustice for Galavan's (Dumas) dynasty in the past. When the Order was finished, Gordon later kills Galavan. A month after Galavan was killed, Gordon was put in testimony to the court, telling them that Oswald killed Galavan. This backfires when a former forensic, now rogue criminal Edward Nygma discovers a source who got a clue of Galavan's murder, a cop named Carl Pinkney. Exploiting it, Nygma gets the contact and kills him, framing Gordon for murder and putting him in Blackgate Penitentiary. He escapes from a corrupt warden, Carlson Grey (with the help of Bullock, Carmine Falcone, and his contacts), who he later finds out is Nygma, finally arresting him and Nygma going into Arkham. During that time, Gordon soon goes into the conflict with a new director of Arkham, a scientist Hugo Strange, who makes inhuman experimentations in Indian Hill, including the resurrections of Theo Galavan and Fish Mooney. Gordon learns that Hugo Strange hired the hitman Patrick "Matches" Malone to kill the Waynes when Hugo was friends with, but later betrayed them. Gordon, Bruce and Lucius Fox enter the Arkham to take down Strange and his workers, accidentally releasing the "monsters" on the Gotham's streets. They also save Selina Kyle who was searching for a friend called Bridget Pike. After the conflict with Hugo Strange at Arkham Asylum, Gordon left Gotham to find Leslie Thompkins, who had left Gotham, only later discovering that she was in a new relationship with Mario Calvi, discouraging him from pursuing her.

Six months later, in season 3, Gordon is working as a bounty hunter, forming an uneasy alliance with reporter Valerie Vale. After experiencing a hallucination of his father, Gordon decides to rejoin the department. After Mario is infected by Alice Tetch's poisonous blood, Mario manipulates Lee into turning against Gordon. Before Mario can kill Lee, Gordon kills him in self-defense. This destroys any relationship Jim or Lee ever had. As his career goes on, Jim finds out his father and Uncle Frank were members of the Court of Owls. After Frank reveals he killed Gordon's father to prevent him from spreading info about the Court, Frank commits suicide, but not before telling Gordon that he must join the Court. Gordon takes the blame for Frank's death and meets with the Court.

After saving some of his fellow police officers and some of Oswald Cobblepot's men from Professor Pyg, Jim is promoted to captain by mayor Burke.

Following the defeat of Bane and Nyssa al Ghul, Jim Gordon is promoted to police commissioner by Mayor Cheng. His relationship with Lee blooms-up again and the two of them get married.

Ten years later, Jim is planning to step down until Batman saves his daughter from Jeremiah.

=== Harvey Bullock ===
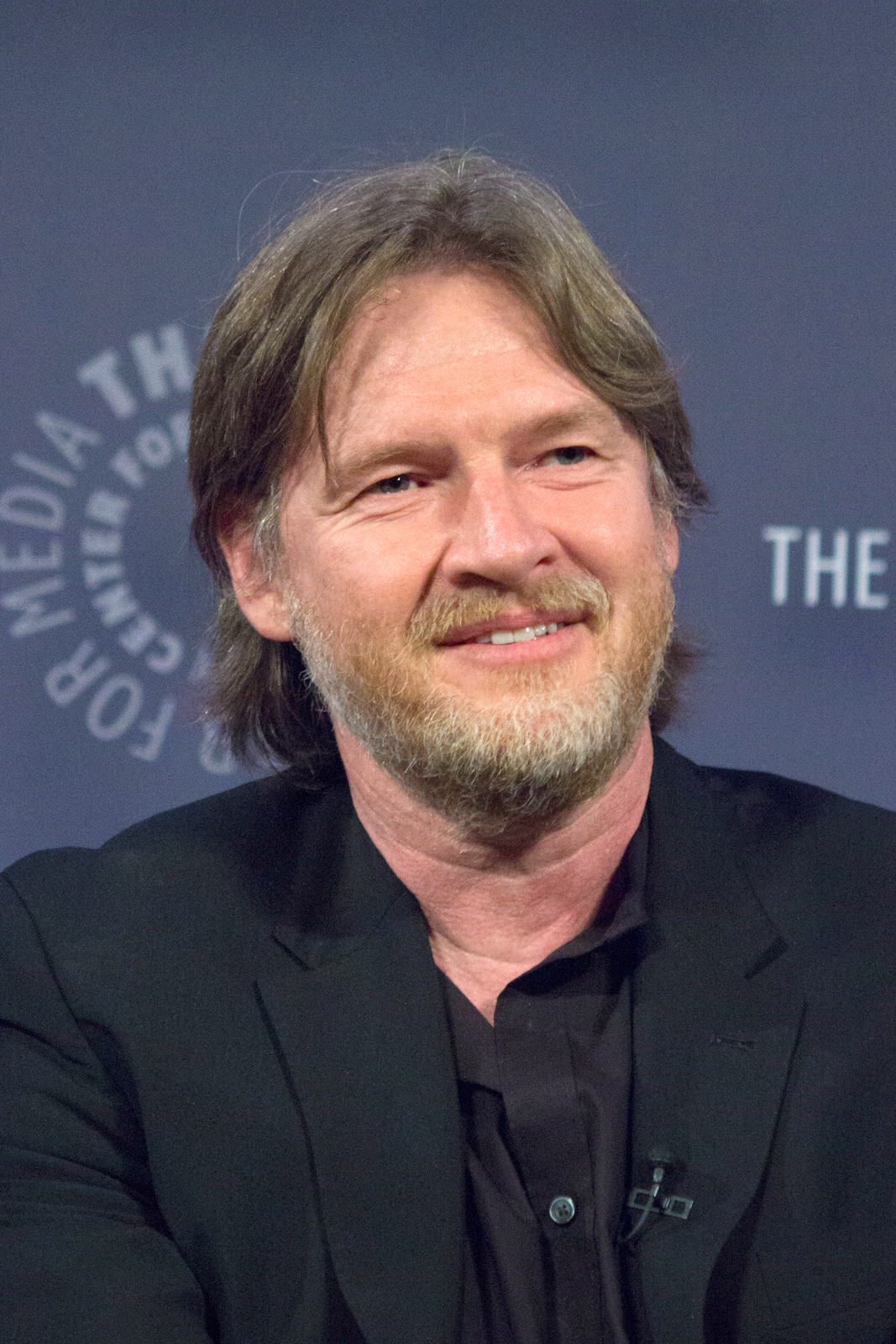
Donal Logue

Harvey Bullock (portrayed by Donal Logue; seasons 1–5) is a detective who is Gordon's loyal partner and ally. Bullock is a seemingly corrupt and brutish detective who has gradually become loyal to Jim Gordon. He also had a somewhat amicable relationship with Fish Mooney before turning against her. Bullock helps Gordon in solving various cases and later enters in a gang war near the end of the first season.

At the beginning of the second season, Bullock resigns from the police force but rejoins following the Maniax attack on the GCPD. After Gordon is framed for the murder of Carl Pinkney, Bullock enlists Carmine Falcone to help break Jim out of prison. When Captain Barnes is hospitalized after an attack by Azrael, Harvey is declared the de facto Captain until further notice and is trusted by Jim to protect Gotham after new threats emerge while he is away.

Six months later, Harvey is working with Barnes to protect Gotham and while Jim refuses to return to the department, Harvey vows to never turn his back on him. When Nathaniel Barnes gets infected with the Alice Tetch virus and is remanded to Arkham Asylum, Harvey becomes the acting captain.

In light of being promoted to captain by Mayor Burke after saving some police officers and some of Oswald Cobblepot's men from Professor Pyg's trap, Gordon reluctantly relieves Bullock of his position of acting captain.

In the series finale 10 years later, he is framed for murder, only for Gordon to deduce that it was a setup by Jeremiah, whom Bruce then subdues during his first outing as Batman. At the end of the episode, Bullock joins Gordon in witnessing Batman watching over them.

=== Bruce Wayne ===
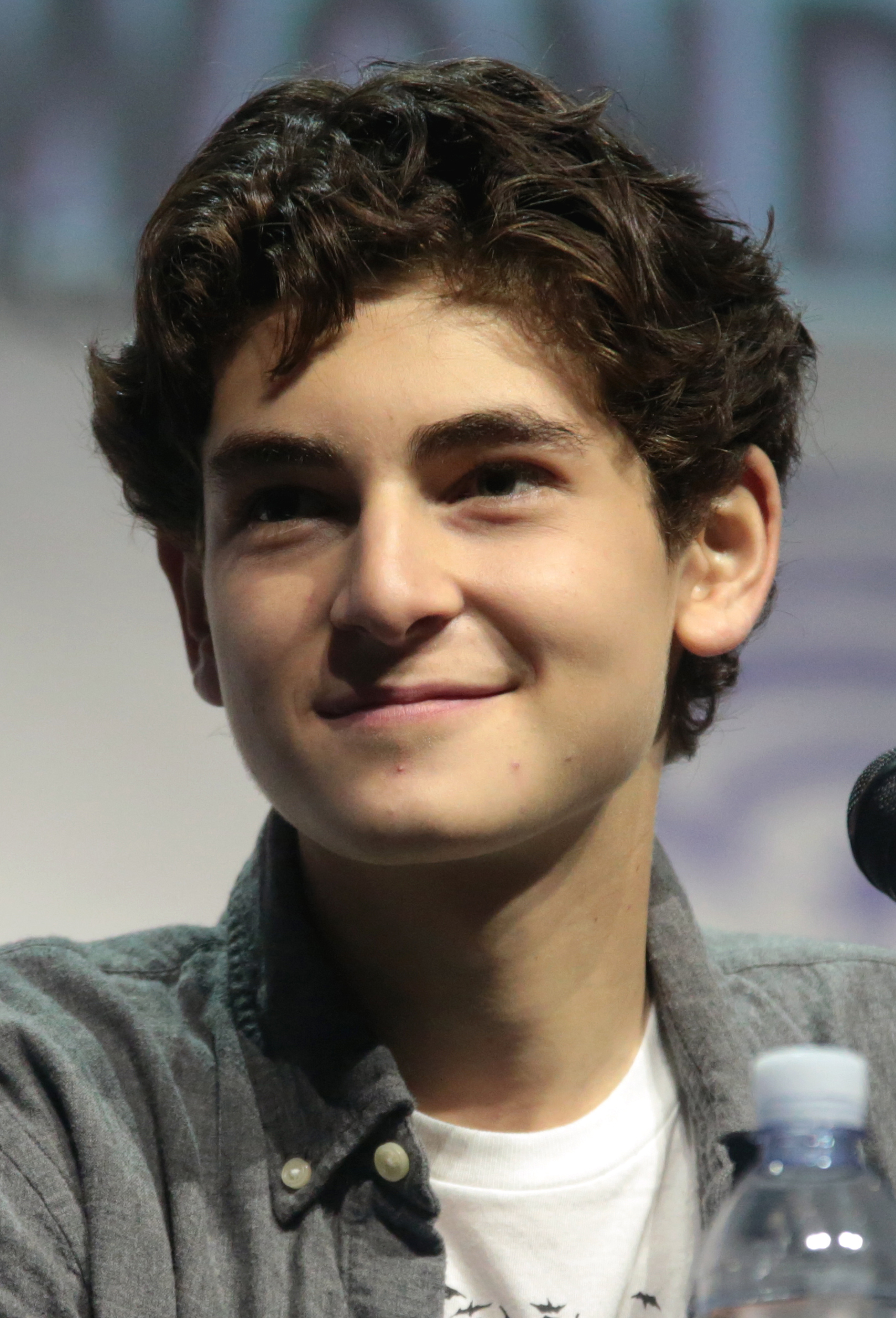
David Mazouz

Bruce Wayne (portrayed by David Mazouz; seasons 1–5) is the orphaned son of Thomas and Martha Wayne, who is under the care of Alfred Pennyworth. Traumatised by the murder of his parents, which he witnessed, Bruce has been doing his part to find the identity of his parents' killer, while showing concern of some illegal activities performed by members of his father's company.

Bruce displays a fervent tendency to train himself as investigator and combatant but is still navigating the remainder of his childhood with Alfred's guidance.

After he is kidnapped by the Court, Bruce finds himself in a dungeon surrounded by snowy mountains. Meeting a Shaman there, Bruce begins his combat training. After breaking free from Ra's al Ghul's control, Bruce makes plans to protect Gotham City.

In the series finale, set 10 years after main events of the fifth season, the adult Bruce goes on to fight crime as the masked vigilante Batman. In his first outing under this persona, he apprehends Penguin and Riddler, helps Gordon rescue his daughter by defeating Jeremiah Valeska, and has an emotional exchange with Selina Kyle before silently observing Gordon, Bullock, and Alfred from a distance.

=== Oswald Cobblepot / Penguin ===
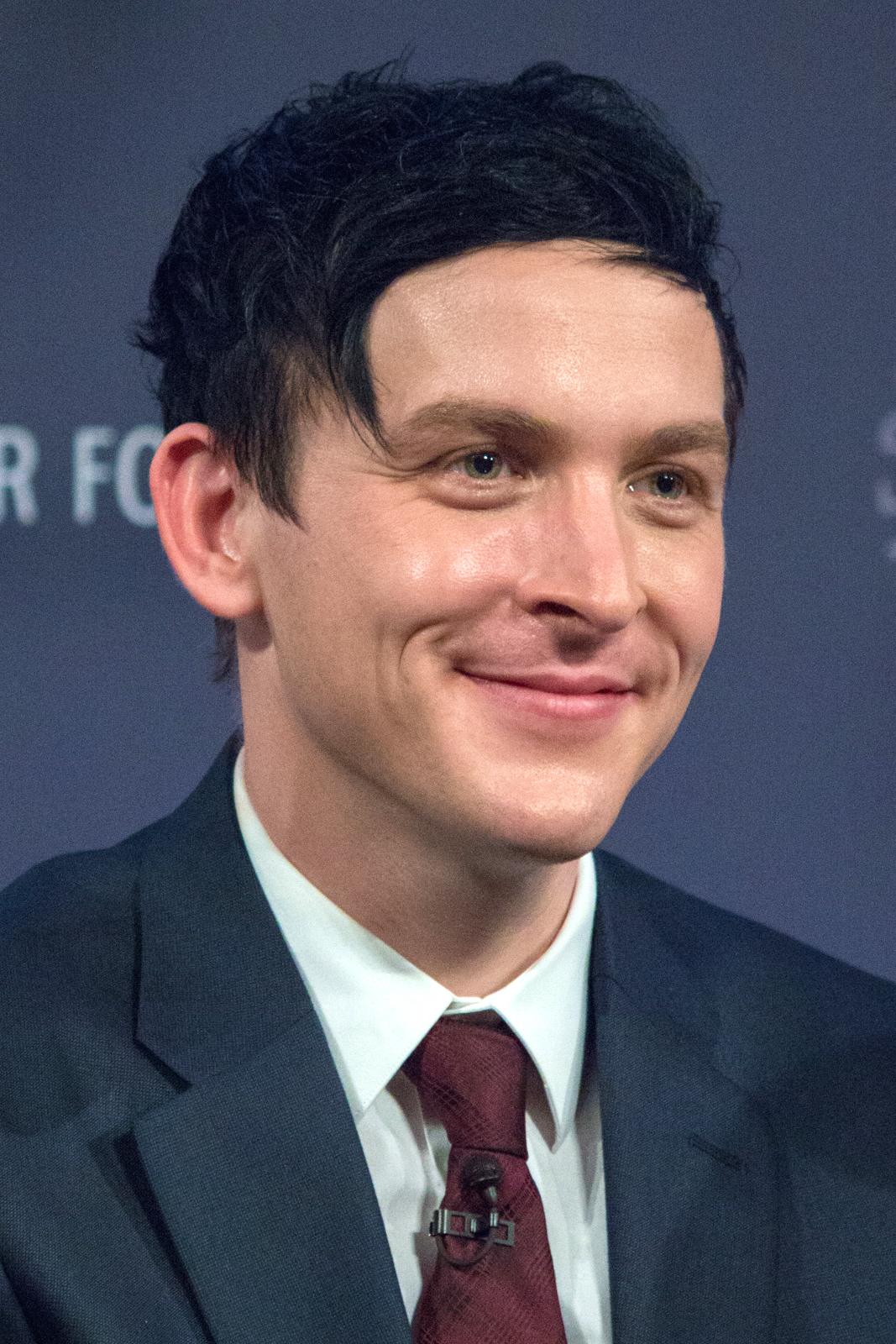
Robin Lord Taylor

Oswald Chesterfield (Kapelput) Cobblepot (portrayed by Robin Lord Taylor; seasons 1–5) is a cunning, well-spoken criminal "snitch". He starts out as an attendant for Fish Mooney at her nightclub, and early on displays a sadistic, violent streak despite his small size. After he is discovered to be an informant for the GCPD, he is brutally beaten, leaving him with an odd way of walking furthering his nickname "Penguin". He escapes an attempt on his life, collaborating with Don Falcone when Gordon deliberately misfires at the pier where Oswald has been sent for execution. After a stint in the Maroni crime family as a restaurant manager, he convinces Maroni of his loyalty, even setting up a robbery by some actors in which he feigns heroism to show his devotion. He later kills the three actors with poisoned cannolis and presumably keeps the stolen cash they had on them. Oswald later assumes Mooney's position in the Falcone crime family when Mooney's plot against the Don is uncovered. At the end of season one, Oswald is Gotham City's sole remaining mob boss, with all of his rivals either dead, missing, or having fled Gotham.

Theo Galavan and Tabitha kidnap his mother, forcing him to help them. After they kill her, Oswald swears revenge and is later wounded during an attack on an event where Theo is holding his victory party for his election. After recuperating at Edward Nygma's place, he and Gabe follow Theo Galavan's henchmen where they save Jim Gordon from him. After the battle against the Saint Dumas, Oswald knocks out Nathaniel Barnes and convinces Gordon that Theo may never be convicted and must be killed. He and Jim then take Galavan to an isolated area, and Oswald mercilessly beats Galavan for killing his mother, before Gordon finishes Theo off with a gunshot.

After Theo's death, Oswald's men abandon him, and he is later found and arrested by the GCPD. After telling Barnes he's "insane," Oswald is taken to Arkham Asylum, where he meets Hugo Strange. After noticing and asking a fellow inmate at Arkham, he later finds out that he is to be experimented on. Following some experiments, Oswald is released from Arkham. He later meets his biological father Elijah Van Dahl when visiting his mother's grave. After his step-family murders Elijah to gain the family's fortune, Oswald awakens from his condition and slaughters his step-family in vengeance. After finding out that Azrael happens to be the resurrected Theo Galavan, Oswald and Butch kill Galavan with an RPG. After finding out about Hugo Strange's experiments, Oswald, Butch, and his gang knock down the bus supposedly containing Strange, but a shocked Oswald is knocked out by a resurrected Fish Mooney, prompting Butch and the gang to flee.

The third season of Gotham explores Oswald's continued struggle against the monsters, a final confrontation with Fish Mooney, and his rise and fall as Mayor of Gotham. After working with Edward Nygma to get into office, Oswald develops romantic feelings for him, resulting in consequences within the political and criminal worlds of the city. After his downfall, Oswald forms an alliance with Ivy Pepper and exacts revenge on those who betrayed him.

Upon establishing the Pax Penguina where criminals can get a license from him to commit a crime, Oswald Cobblepot has his encounter with Sofia Falcone. After figuring out Sofia's plot, Oswald ends up in a gang war with her. Later on when Gotham City becomes a no man's land, Oswald kills Butch Gilzean as part of his revenge on Tabitha for killing his mother. He then has Hugo Strange work on saving the lives of Leslie Thompkins and Riddler while he claims some territory.

Ten years later, Penguin is released from Blackgate Penitentiary. He tries to shoot Gordon at the pier only to fail. After helping to rescue Riddler, Penguin drives off with him only for them to be defeated by Bruce Wayne in his first outing as Batman. En route to their incarcerations, Penguin and Riddler escape and plan to get revenge, but when they see their new enemy using a grappling hook to glide between rooftops, they decide to start the next day.

=== Barbara Kean ===
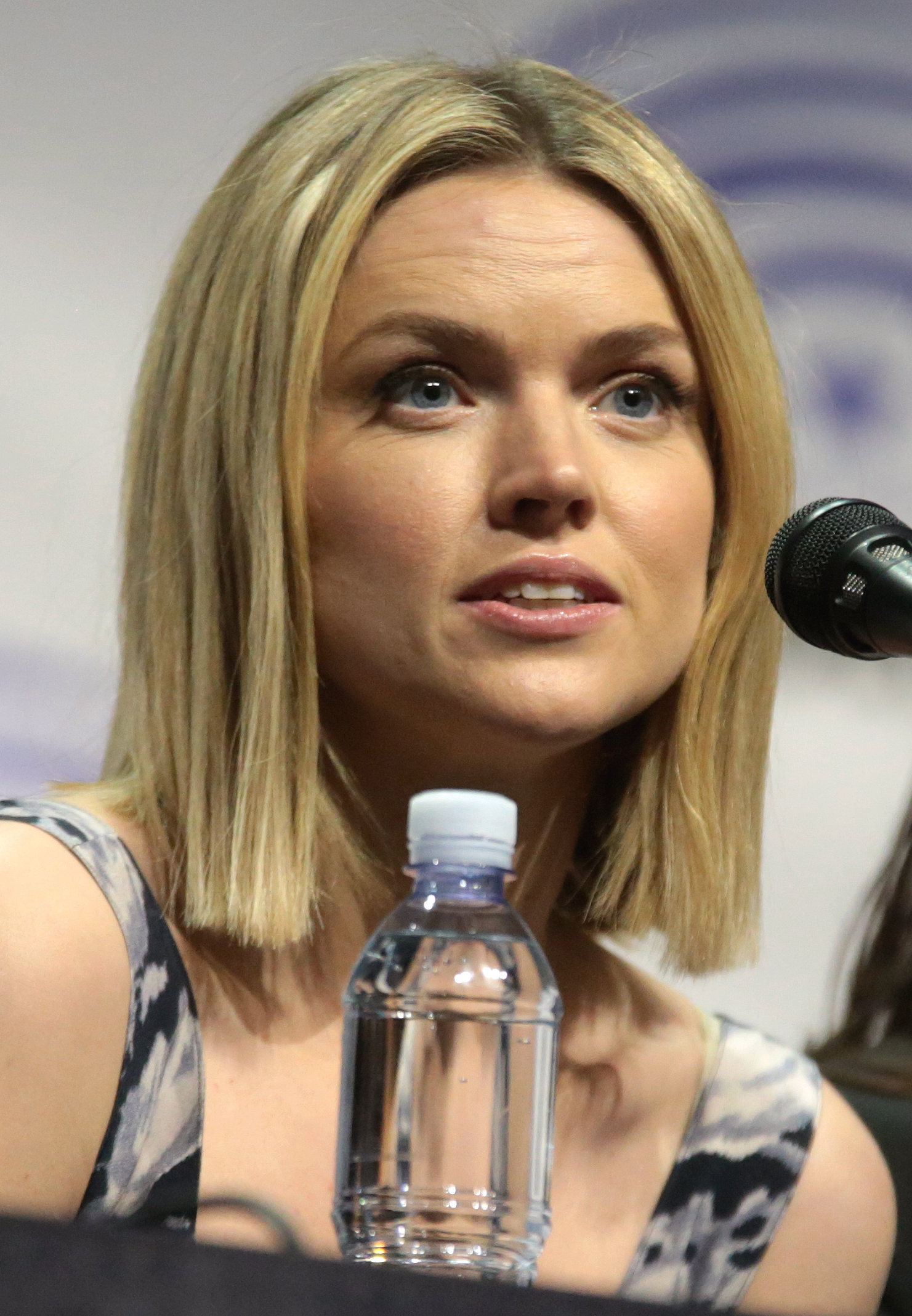
Erin Richards

Barbara Kean (portrayed by Erin Richards; seasons 1–5) is the daughter of a wealthy couple and the owner of an art gallery. She is the ex-fiancée of James Gordon and is portrayed as bisexual, having had a relationship with the detective Renee Montoya in the TV series. Early on in the series, she befriends Selina Kyle and Ivy Pepper.

Jason Lennon, a wealthy serial killer known as "the Ogre", seduces Kean. Lennon kidnaps her, exploits her mental instability and emotional vulnerability, and persuades Kean to confront her resentment towards her parents. The confrontation leads to Kean murdering her parents in a fit of rage. Kean later attempts to murder Leslie Thompkins, a physician at Arkham Asylum and Gordon's new love interest, during an informal counseling session. Kean is institutionalized until she is among those sprung from Arkham Asylum by Tabitha Galavan. Kean and Tabitha develop a romantic relationship.

Following Kean's attempt on Gordon's life at Gotham Cathedral, she is placed in a medically induced coma for the injuries she acquired during the struggle and is transferred to Arkham Asylum's medical wing. Kean awakens from her coma after hearing news on the radio of Gordon's incarceration. Hugo Strange releases her from the asylum so he can study her.

Kean and Tabitha Galavan open a nightclub called "The Sirens". Kean learns that Oswald Cobblepot has romantic feelings for Edward Nygma. She correctly deduces that Cobblepot is responsible for the death of Nygma's girlfriend, Isabella. She informs Nygma of Cobblepot's feelings and involvement in Isabella's death, prompting Nygma to join her, Tabitha, and Butch in plotting against Cobblepot. Later, Kean learns that Butch and Tabitha plan to betray her. Kean shoots Butch, who is later resurrected. During a confrontation with Tabitha at Kean's safehouse, Kean is fatally electrocuted. She is resurrected by League of Shadows leader Ra's al Ghul.

Cobblepot dispatches Barbara Kean, Tabitha Galavan, and Selina Kyle to kidnap Nygma. Following an altercation, they defect from Cobblepot's services and side with Sofia Falcone.

A beacon Ra's al Ghul planted within Kean summons the League of Shadows to the Sirens Nightclub. Kean helps Alfred rescue Bruce Wayne from Ra's al Ghul's manipulation attempts. She forces Bruce's hand into stabbing Ra's al Ghul. After the defeat of Ra's al Ghul, the members of the League of Shadows offer to follow Kean. She learns that Cobblepot has killed Butch, fueling her resentment towards men, and decides to kill the males from the League of Shadows.

A few weeks after the government abandons Gotham, Cobblepot kills Tabitha Galavan, and Kean vows revenge. She later rescues Gordon while he is on a mission. They have a one-night stand, and Kean becomes pregnant. She requests that Leslie Thompkins provide prenatal care for her. After Kean gives birth, she and Thompkins are chased by Bane at the request of Nyssa al Ghul for Kean's involvement in Nyssa's father's death. Once Bane is defeated, Kean reveals that she named her daughter "Barbara Lee" after the people she trusts most (as Leslie Thompkins's nickname is "Lee"). She ends her feud with Thompkins. Gordon, Thompkins, and Kean agree to raise the child together.

In the series finale, set ten years later, Kean is no longer involved in criminal activities. She is working on a tower to outdo the size of the rebuilt Wayne Tower. Kean and Barbara Lee are ambushed by Jeremiah, who kidnaps Barbara Lee. Bruce Wayne, now Batman, rescues Barbara Lee.

=== Sarah Essen ===
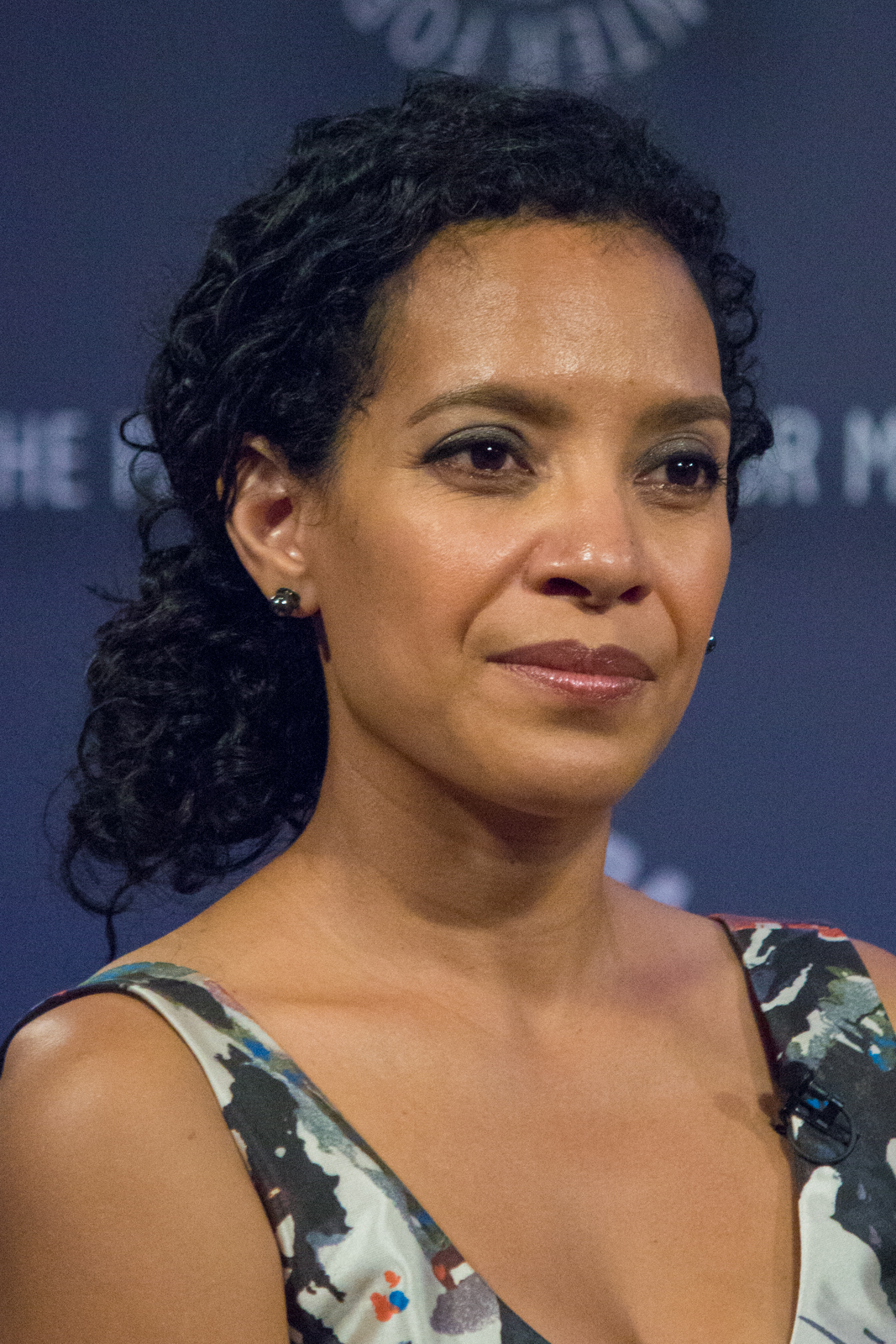
Zabryna Guevara

Sarah Essen (portrayed by Zabryna Guevara; seasons 1–2) is the Captain of the Gotham City Police Department's homicide squad and the boss of James Gordon and Harvey Bullock. She is an honest cop who wants to do something about the rampant corruption in her department but fears for her family's safety.

Following Gillian Loeb's resignation, Sarah Essen is sworn in as the new police commissioner. She is later killed by Jerome Valeska during the Maniax's raid on the Gotham City Police Department.

=== Alfred Pennyworth ===
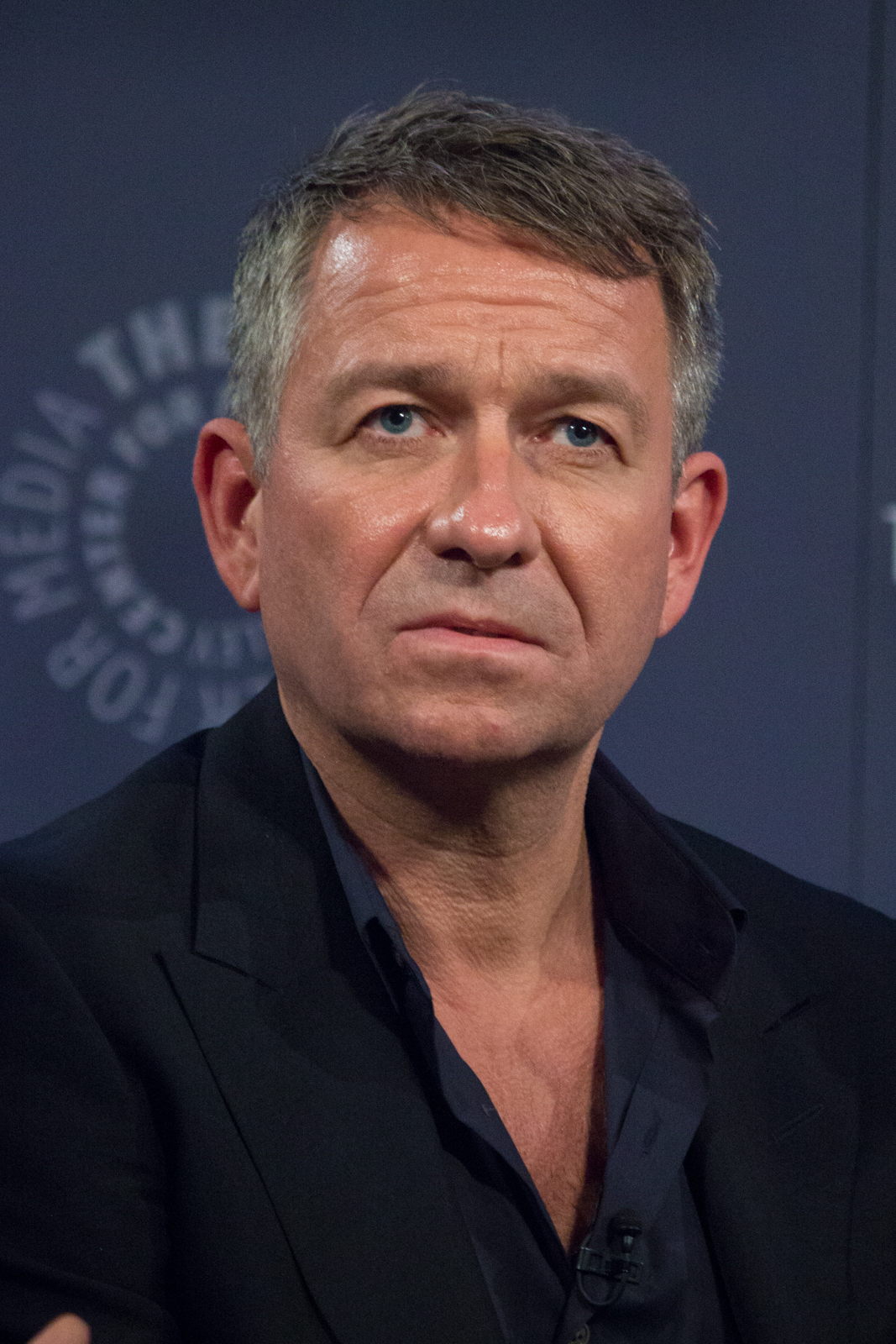
Sean Pertwee

Alfred Pennyworth (portrayed by Sean Pertwee; seasons 1–5; Jack Bannon; Pennyworth), an ex-Special Air Service operative, is the butler and legal guardian of Bruce Wayne. Though technically Bruce's legal guardian, Alfred is still more willing to go along with Bruce's whims of investigating leads to the murder of his parents. Alfred is teaching Bruce basic self-defense.

At one point, he even let Bruce use his father's watch as improvised brass knuckles to beat up Thomas Elliot for insulting the late Waynes. He often helps Bruce and Jim with certain situations. Although he still looks after Bruce, Alfred allows him to go his own way sometimes.

During the chaos caused by the Alice Tetch virus outbreak, Bruce stabs Alfred and then uses the Lazarus Pit's waters to cauterise the wound as Alfred recuperates in the hospital.

Following the incident where Bruce ended up having to stab Ra's al Ghul with the embalming knife, Alfred works to get Bruce back to normal when he starts partying with his friends from school.

When Gotham City is made a no man's land, Bruce persuades Alfred to be evacuated with a recuperating Selina. Alfred vows to come back when Selina fully recovers.

Ten years later, Alfred represents Bruce at the opening of the new Wayne Tower. After being with Lucius when the police find Penguin and Riddler tied up, Alfred goes to the rooftop of the Gotham City Police Department and witnesses Gordon and Bullock's first sighting of Bruce as Batman.

=== Selina Kyle ===
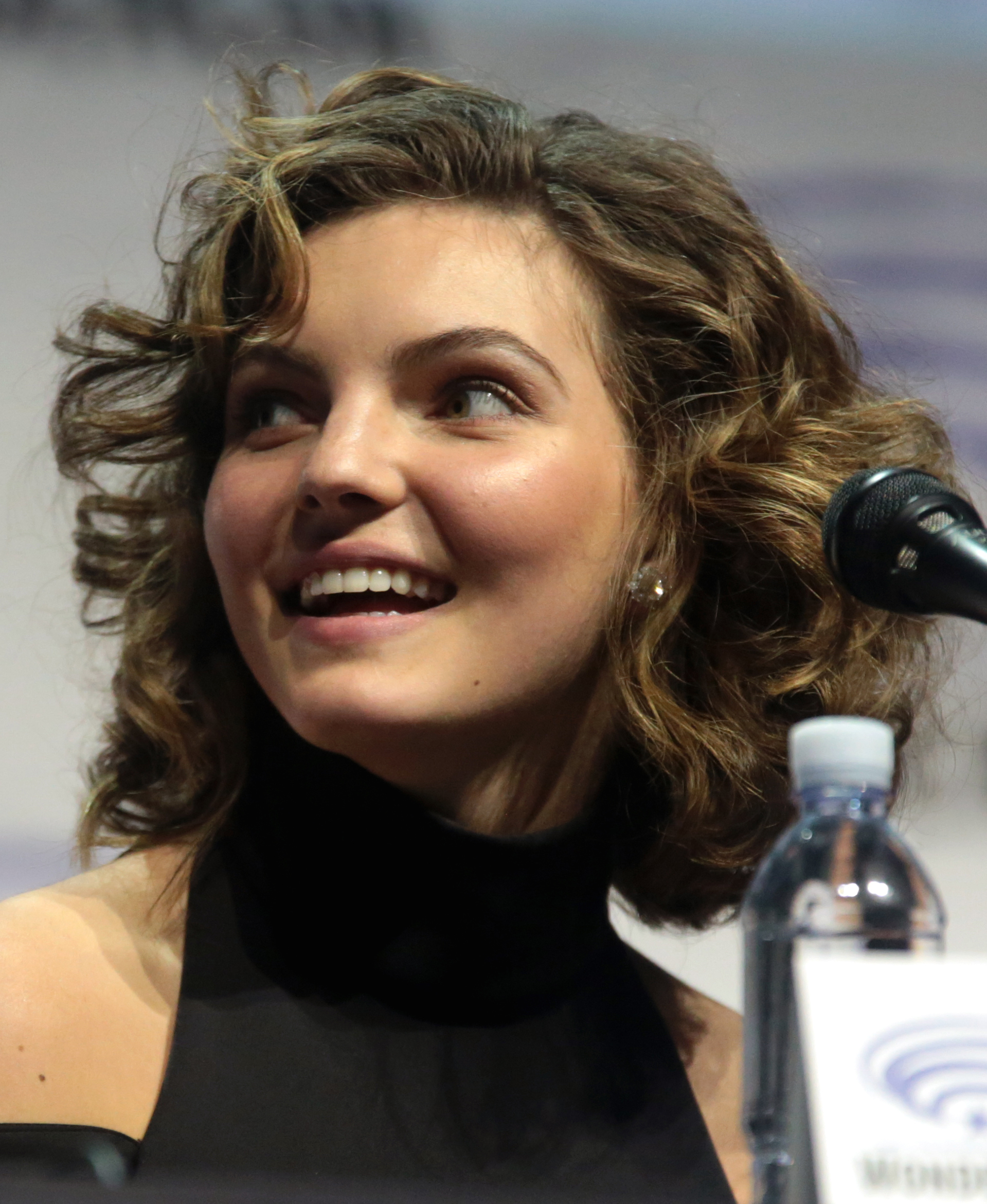
Camren Bicondova

Selina Kyle (portrayed by Camren Bicondova; seasons 1–5; Lili Simmons in "The Beginning...") is a young street orphan and skilled thief who was a childhood friend of Bridget Pike. Since witnessing the murders of Thomas and Martha Wayne while memorizing what the murderer looked like without the mask, Cat has been lingering around the borders of Wayne Manor which leads to her befriending Bruce Wayne. Cat also has connections with Ivy Pepper and later befriends Barbara Kean. During the gang war between Carmine Falcone and Sal Maroni, Selina is among the street children recruited into Fish Mooney's gang. During Oswald Cobblepot's fight with Fish Mooney, Selina disappears.

She later appears as part of Cobblepot's gang and develops a rivalry with Silver St. Cloud for the affection of Bruce. Selina later helps Bruce to expose Silver and find a hint to who killed his parents while also helping to rescue Bruce from the Order of St. Dumas. She allowed Bruce to live on the streets with her for a while until Gordon ended up on the lam and played a part in Edward Nygma's arrest. When Bruce decided to go back home, Selina storms out in anger. Selina later infiltrated Arkham Asylum to find Hugo Strange's experiments and a newly reformed Pike, calling herself Firefly, after being told about her survival by Bruce. Selina later asks to be Firefly's servant and is released later from Arkham after freeing Gordon, Bruce, and Lucius.

Selina is later shown to have re-aligned with Fish Mooney following her revival. When one of Fish Mooney's minions catches Ivy, Selina tries to intervene which led to her witnessing Fish Mooney's minion Marv touching Ivy prior to her falling into the river.

Unable to get Bruce's help to find Ivy, Selina is approached by James Gordon if she knows any info about Alice Tetch. She did tell him that she was a one-time member of Fish Mooney's latest gang before she parted ways with her. Later on, she encounters Subject 514A who was posing as Bruce Wayne. While suspicious about Bruce Wayne's look-a-like, Selina decides to go out to dinner with him. Eventually, after 514A saves Selina after she fails to rob a bar, she sees 514A's scars and realizes he is not Bruce. 514A explains the situation, and Selina tells him he's more normal than Bruce. With that, 514A kisses Selina and the two part ways. Later, while Selina is stealing wallets at the Penguin's party, she encounters an older Ivy, though she does not recognize her. After Bruce confesses his feelings for her, Selina kisses him. Once Ivy reveals herself, Selina is shocked and unclear of whether she and Bruce are in a relationship or not. After trying to help Bruce and Alfred break into a Court building, they are assisted by Selina's long-lost mother. Although Selina's mother seems to want to reconnect with her daughter, Selina later discovers that her mother only returned to extort money from Bruce Wayne. Selina then tearfully tells her mother to never return to Gotham. Selina gets mad at Bruce once she finds out he kept it from her. Later, however, Selina and Bruce show some signs of reconciling.

Upon her latest encounter with Subject 514A and being surprised that Bruce is not in Gotham City, Selina tries to warn Alfred only to be pushed out the window by 514A. The stray cats then swarm over her body. Her body was found by the police and was taken to the hospital. Thanks to Ivy Pepper's plants, Selina recovered and plans to go to Wayne Manor to get revenge on Subject 514A. Even though she and Alfred fail to defeat Subject 514A, Selina was not interested in helping Alfred find Bruce.

After her friendship with Bruce is strained during the chaos caused by Alice Tetch virus and Alfred getting stabbed, Selina meets up with Tabitha Galavan where she tests her talents on Tabitha's whip upon telling Tabitha that she is "done just surviving". Eventually, Selina and Tabitha work for a revived Barbara Kean after she made amends with them even when Barbara aligns herself with Sofia Falcone. Though she reconciles with Bruce, Selina is later shot in the waist by Jeremiah Valeska, leaving her with a severed spine. When Gotham City becomes a no man's land, Bruce convinces Alfred to go with Selina to oversee her recovery.

Many days later, Selina has undergone an operation to keep her spine from collapsing. After an attempt to take her life is thwarted by the doctors, Bruce takes the advice of a nurse to seek out "the witch" as he asks where to find her. Selina gets healed and later assists Bruce and Gordon in their fight against Jeremiah Valeska and Delta Force. She is saddened by Bruce's decision to leave the city soon afterward.

Ten years later, Selina has become a jewel thief. She attends the opening of the new Wayne Tower and drags Barbara into subduing Riddler, who has been manipulated by Jeremiah to bomb the building. Later that night, Selina has an emotional exchange with Bruce, whom she deeply misses, in his first outing as Batman. Before leaving, Batman advises Selina to return a diamond she had stolen. After he leaves, Selina mutters "like hell".

=== Edward Nygma / Riddler ===
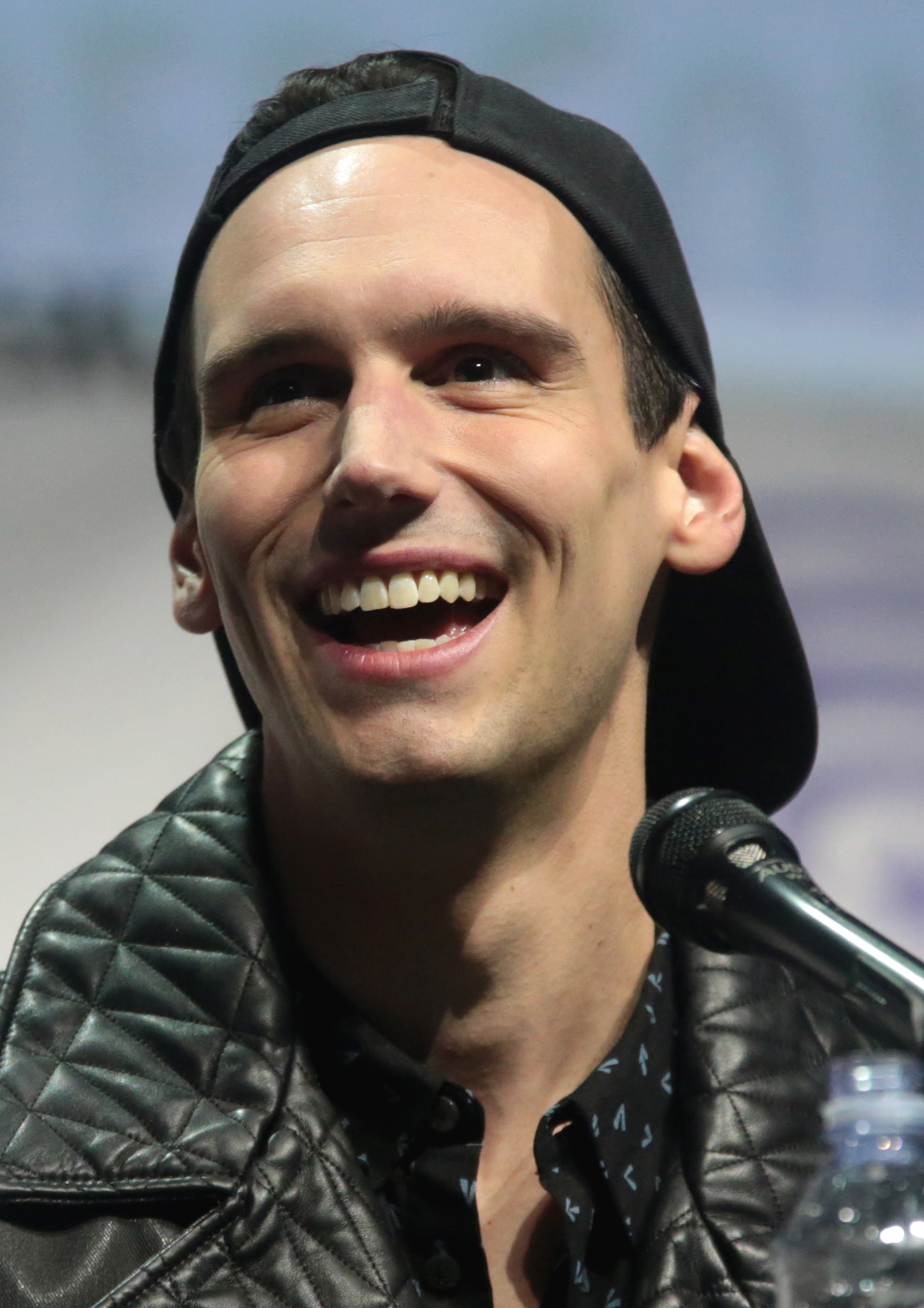
Cory Michael Smith

Edward "Ed" Nygma (portrayed by Cory Michael Smith; seasons 1–5) is a forensics operative who works for the Gotham City Police Department and often presents his information in riddles. He initially starts off as an awkward but intelligent man with an unrequited crush on archivist Kristen Kringle. After being constantly mistreated by his fellow co-workers, he murders a fellow officer named Tom, Kringle's abusive boyfriend, which causes him to suffer a mental breakdown that results in a second personality. He eventually became Kristen's boyfriend, but after revealing the truth of his murder to Kringle, he accidentally strangles her in an attempt to stop her from calling the police. Following this, his narcissistic dark side manipulates him, eventually taking over. While burying her body in the woods, a passerby approaches and interferes, whom Nygma kills. After finding him in the woods hiding from Theo Galavan, Nygma allows Oswald Cobblepot to live with him, later assisting him in healing Gordon.

Nygma later figures out Gordon's hand in Theo Galavan's death and orchestrates his arrest by framing him for the death of Carl Pinkney. During a confrontation with Gordon at the spot where Kristin Kringle was buried, Nygma's plot was exposed with Nathaniel Barnes and the other police officers nearby. Nygma is arrested by the police and remanded to Arkham Asylum. After he investigates and finds out who Hugo Strange is and his experiments, Nygma briefly escapes but is caught and recaptured after a brief encounter with Selina. He later aids Strange in interrogating Bruce Wayne and Lucius Fox but was re-incarcerated afterwards.

Six months later, Oswald has him declared sane and has him released from Arkham Asylum so that he can help Penguin become mayor. Nygma buys back the money that Butch was bribing people with in order to vote for Oswald, in order to prove a point that the people of Gotham loved him regardless. Later, Nygma meets and becomes infatuated with a woman striking the resemblance to Kringle and also likes riddles named Isabella. After forming a relationship with her, Oswald, who secretly harbors feelings for Nygma, orders Gabriel to cut the brakes off of Isabella's car, killing her. After Nygma is informed by Barbara of Oswald's romantic feelings for him, he discovers that he indeed killed Isabella. Nygma then forms a partnership with Barbara, Tabitha, and Butch to destroy everything Penguin loves, and after breaking his sanity and destroying his reputation, Nygma shoots Oswald in the harbor docks, although Oswald claims to love Nygma still, and Nygma is nothing without him. Nygma then begins a killing spree in order to prove his superiority, taking pills that cause him to hallucinate Oswald, before taking the moniker of the Riddler.

In order to get the Court of Owls to reveal themselves, the Riddler takes Mayor Aubrey James captive. Meeting with Gordon at the police station, Riddler agrees to Gordon's terms to accompany him. When on a road, Riddler agrees to go along with Kathryn and the Talon after Kathryn referenced the fact that Hugo Strange left Riddler's "who actually runs Gotham" question. As the Talon loads Nygma into the car, Kathryn tells Gordon that they will find a use for Riddler before departing. Nygma later discovered that Oswald Cobblepot is his neighbouring prisoner. Both of them work together to escape from their prison.

At the conclusion of the chaos caused by the Alice Tetch virus, Oswald outsmarts Riddler and has Victor Fries use his freeze gun on him, in order to use his frozen body as the centerpiece of his Iceberg Lounge and as a reminder to never let love be his downfall again.

Riddler is later freed by a woman named Myrtle Jenkins who tries to get him back to good health, only to discover he has become mentally impaired after being frozen. After knocking Myrtle out, Riddler leaves her apartment and heads out to plan revenge on Oswald. Due to his brain still recovering from the ice, Riddler was unable to do his usual riddles on Oswald who ended up sparing Riddler from Victor Fries. Riddler later encountered Butch Gilzean, now known as Solomon Grundy. Nygma has Grundy accompany him to a nearby club, using him as the champion of The Narrows.

When Selina captures Nygma, under orders by Oswald, Leslie Thompkins suggests pitting the champions of both sides against each other for the fate of Edward Nygma. Tabitha wins, only for Firefly to crash the fight to finish the job that Oswald Cobblepot gave her. While Solomon Grundy was having his wounds tended to, Nygma suggests to Leslie that she takes the position as Queen of the Narrows.

Nygma goes on to become Thompkins right-hand, where he falls in love with her, before she eventually reveals that his intelligence has already returned. This causes the return of Nygma's alternate Riddler personality, who causes problems for Nygma, causing him to resort to suicide by hanging before opting to return to Arkham. As he contemplates signing the papers, a delighted Oswald reveals that he sent a letter to him hoping the Riddler would read it and Nygma would return to Arkham. He adds that he can truly see who he is and finally calls him Riddler, allowing Riddler to take over Nygma.

When Gotham City becomes a no man's land, Riddler ends up in a mutual stabbing with Leslie Thompkins. Their bodies are found by Oswald's men as Hugo Strange is instructed to work on them.

In season five, Riddler begins waking multiple times, unaware of previous events, hoping to discover what Edward was up to. It was revealed that Nyssa Al Ghul had Hugo Strange place a control chip in Riddler's brain, causing him to do orders such as blow up Haven, until it was fried by Gordon using a respirator. Riddler then helps Bruce, Alfred, Barbara, and Lucius reclaim the Gotham City Police Department in a hazmat suit, doing a bomb ruse where the code is provided by the answer to how many times a Pallid beach mouse can give birth in a year. He later teams up with Oswald and Barbara to construct a submarine in order to escape Gotham, before instead to choosing to assist Gordon in fending off Bane and his men.

Ten years later, in the series finale, he is sprung from Arkham Asylum by Jeremiah Valeska, assuming it to be Cobblepot, and proceeds to capture Mayor Aubrey James in order to detonate the newly rebuilt Wayne Tower. He and Oswald are ultimately captured by Bruce Wayne in his first outing as Batman and left for the police. After escaping a prisoner transport van, Riddler and Penguin see their new adversary using a grappling hook to glide between rooftops and plan to get revenge tomorrow.

=== Fish Mooney ===
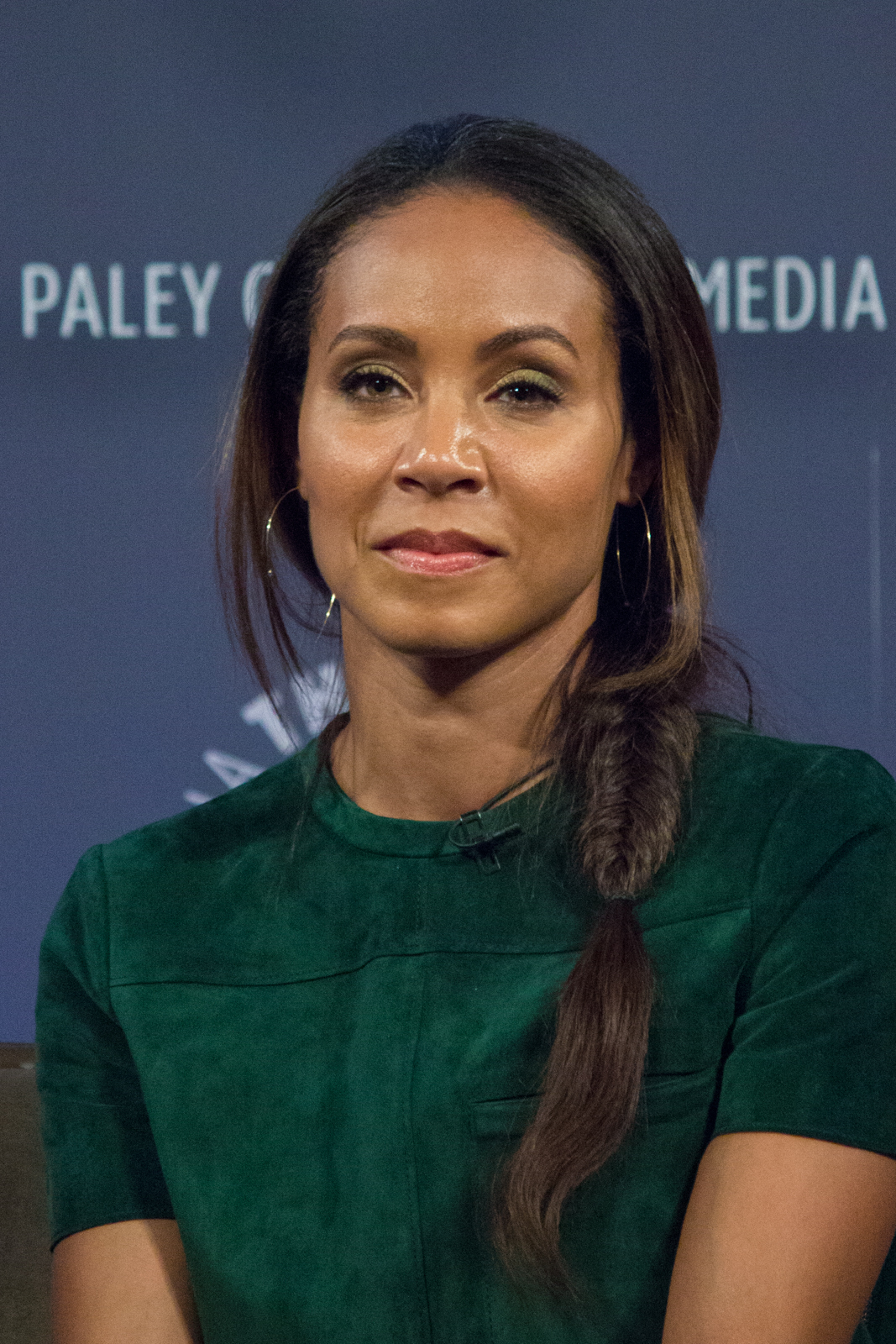
Jada Pinkett Smith

Maria Mercedes "Fish" Mooney (portrayed by Jada Pinkett Smith; main: season 1; guest: season 2; recurring: season 3) is a former nightclub owner and mobster who led a gang under Don Falcone and was the former boss of Oswald Cobblepot. She operated in Gotham City's red-light district despite the heavy presence of the Italian Mafia. Mooney sometimes provides information to Detective Bullock, who has a sweet spot for her. Mooney has secret plans to overthrow Falcone, whom she hates for his otherwise unspecified role in Fish's own mother's death, makes her as the main antagonist of season 1. Her plan involved hiring a girl named Liza to seduce Falcone and secretly blowing up Falcone's money supply. After her plans to overthrow Falcone are exposed by Oswald Cobblepot, who has been blackmailing Liza to get information about both Falcone and Mooney, Don Falcone strangles Liza to death and has Mooney and Butch Gilzean was taken prisoner while the remnants ended up on Oswald Cobblepot's side. After escaping from Falcone's men, Mooney tries to leave Gotham City by water and is captured by the minions of the Dollmaker. Mooney was eventually able to escape with some of her fellow prisoners. She returned to Gotham City during the gang war between Falcone and Maroni and formed her gang from street children, including Selina Kyle. Mooney was pushed off of a building into the ocean in a battle with the Penguin, which seemingly killed her.

In the second season's fall finale, Fish's body is seen at Indian Hill, a scientific division of Wayne Enterprises that secretly performs illegal experiments. Fish is eventually revived in the second season finale while augmented with the help of cuttlefish DNA, being the only one of Hugo Strange's patients have her memories intact for unknown reasons. The side-effects of the revival gave Mooney the ability to take control of anyone that comes in contact with her. She manages to escape from Arkham and knocks out a shocked Penguin on the street.

With some of the Indian Hill escapees on her side as members of her latest gang and even realigning herself with Selina Kyle, Fish Mooney begins raiding every pharmacy for drugs. After learning from Ethel Peabody about the new cells being rejected by her body and that Hugo Strange would fix her, Fish Mooney has her fellow escapee Marv steal her youth. Then Fish Mooney plans to find Strange in order to get him to make more monsters for her gang. When Fish Mooney's follower Nancy catches Ivy Pepper, Selina tries to vouch for her only for Fish Mooney to sic Marv on her.

Fish Mooney was successful at freeing Hugo Strange. Because of what Mooney said to him, Cobblepot decides not to kill her and allows her to leave with Strange while telling her not to return.

Fish Mooney later returned to Gotham City with some armed men and saves Cobblepot from Riddler, Barbara Kean, Tabitha Galavan, and Butch Gilzean. She then makes off with Cobblepot, forgives him, and mends her relationship with Cobblepot.

After obtaining a fleeing Strange, Fish Mooney has him take her, Oswald Cobblepot, Victor Fries, and Bridgit Pike to the slaughterhouse where the antidotes to Alice Tetch's blood is. During a fight between Mooney's followers, James Gordon, and the League of Assassins' ninjas, Fish Mooney is accidentally stabbed by James Gordon. When Cobblepot tells Mooney that they will get her some help, Mooney turns him down stating that this would happen and for Cobblepot to either take control of Gotham City or burn it to the ground as she dies again.

=== Renee Montoya ===
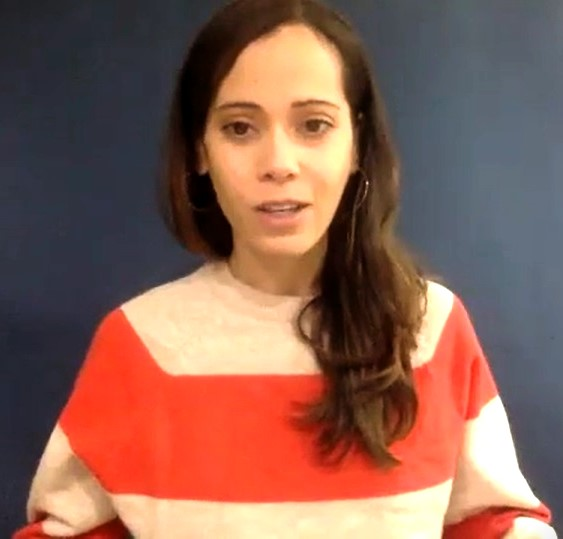
Victoria Cartagena

Renee Montoya (portrayed by Victoria Cartagena; season 1) is a detective in the Major Crimes Unit of the Gotham City Police Department who is dedicated to fighting police corruption. She initially believed that Jim had actually murdered Oswald Cobblepot and was obsessed with arresting him, mostly due to her past relationship with Barbara Kean mixing with her sense of duty, until it was shown that Cobblepot was still alive. She later occasionally assists him in fighting Gotham's corruption after she and Crispus save Jim from being killed by Victor Zsasz. Renee was revealed to have had a relationship with Barbara Kean.

=== Crispus Allen ===
Crispus Allen (portrayed by Andrew Stewart-Jones; season 1) is a detective in the Major Crimes Unit of the Gotham City Police Department who is Renee Montoya's partner. He was with Renee when she was looking for clues to see if Jim Gordon had actually killed Oswald Cobblepot or not. Crispus later occasionally assists Gordon in fighting Gotham's corruption after he and Renee save Jim from being killed by Victor Zsasz.

=== Carmine Falcone ===
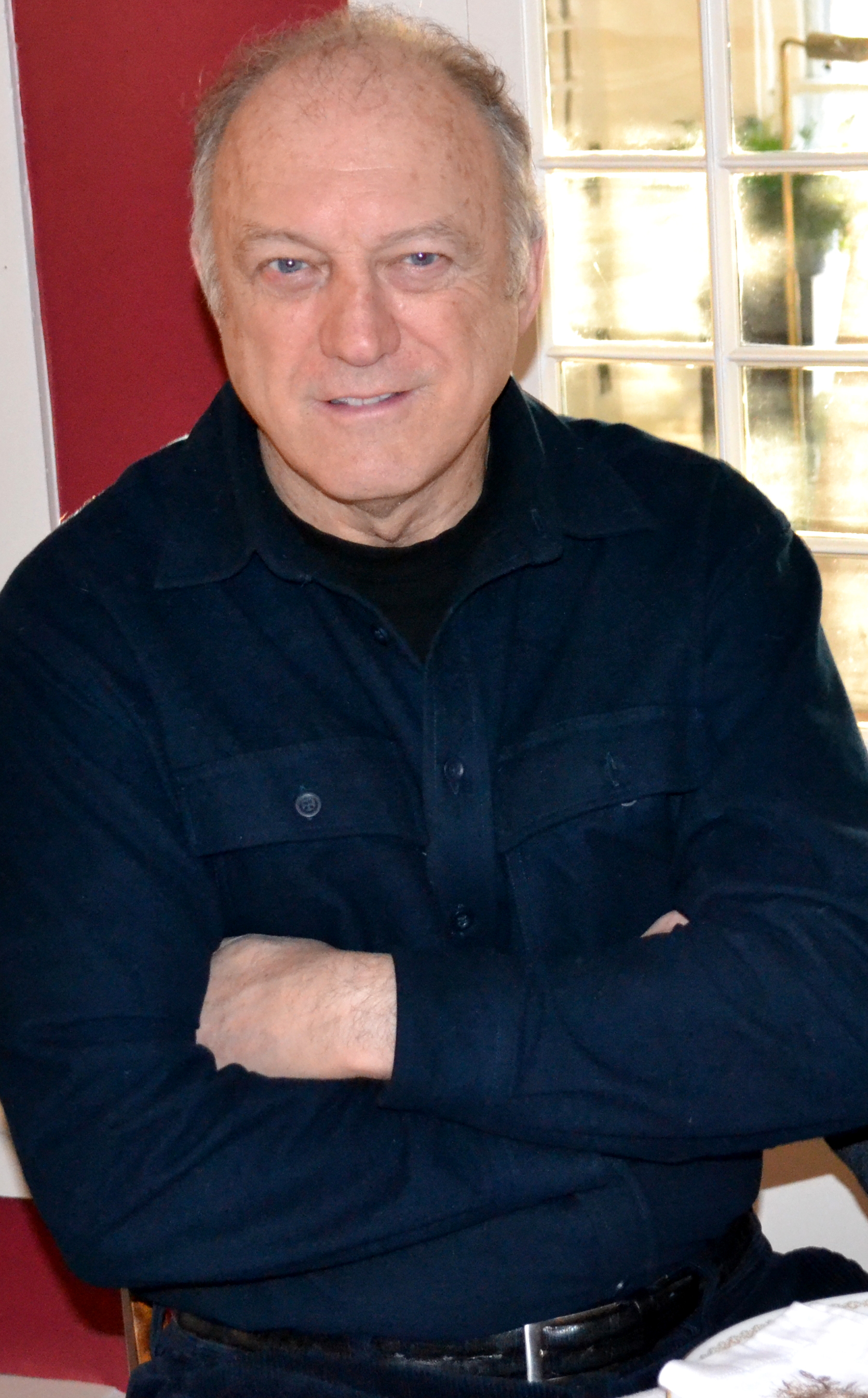
John Doman

Carmine Falcone (portrayed by John Doman; main: season 1; guest: seasons 2 and 4; recurring: season 3) is the Don of the Falcone Crime Family and businessman who is the father of Mario Calvi. He is Fish Mooney's superior and has specific members of both the Gotham City government and the Gotham City Police Department on his payroll (examples being Commissioner Gillian B. Loeb and Mayor Aubrey James) as well as having connections with the Court of Owls. While heading a traditional Cosa Nostra family, Carmine also controls a series of various other criminal organizations in Gotham City including the Triads, the Irish Mob, and Russian Mob as well as other Gotham City gangs such as Fish Mooney's gang.

Upon first encountering Gordon after preventing Fish Mooney's men from killing him and Bullock, he at first dismisses his idealism as naive. His hold on Gotham City is challenged by the rival Maroni family and his allies such as Fish Mooney and the Russian Mob. Several of his caporegimes like Jimmy Saviano have also shown signs of treachery. Following the end of his mob war with the late Sal Maroni and Fish Mooney, Falcone retired and leaves Gotham. Before leaving, he reveals that he used to be friends with Gordon's father prior to being in the mob and gives Gordon a knife that had belonged to Gordon's father and parts on good terms stating that it is time for some real law and order in Gotham.

Falcone later returned to help Harvey Bullock get Jim Gordon out of Blackgate Penitentiary with help from his contacts from within the prison.

Upon Leslie and Mario returning to Gotham City, he gives his approval to Mario for his relationship to Leslie. He also wanted to throw an engagement party for them and was shown to be angered at the Court of Owls for targeting Mario when it later turns out that he was infected with Alice Tetch's poisonous blood. While he was displeased that Gordon gunned down Mario in self-defense, Leslie talked Falcone into calling off Victor Zsasz's hit on Gordon knowing that Mario would've ended up like Nathaniel Barnes did. Carmine later reluctantly helped Gordon by giving him the information on the person who had him hire a lawyer for the drunk driver that caused the car accident that killed Peter Gordon.

Upon heading down to Florida, Gordon tries to get Carmine Falcone to help in the war against Oswald Cobblepot. Carmine declines due to the fact that he is dying and that being in warmer climates would help him but agrees to let his daughter Sofia go in his place. Hearing reports of Sofia's ruthless pursuit of Gotham, Falcone arrives to take her home, telling her she has failed their family and is endangering the family reputation to get revenge for her brother's death. Before he can take her, Falcone is shot and killed by a group of gunmen. Sofia is wounded but later reveals that she is responsible for her father's murder.

=== Lee Thompkins ===
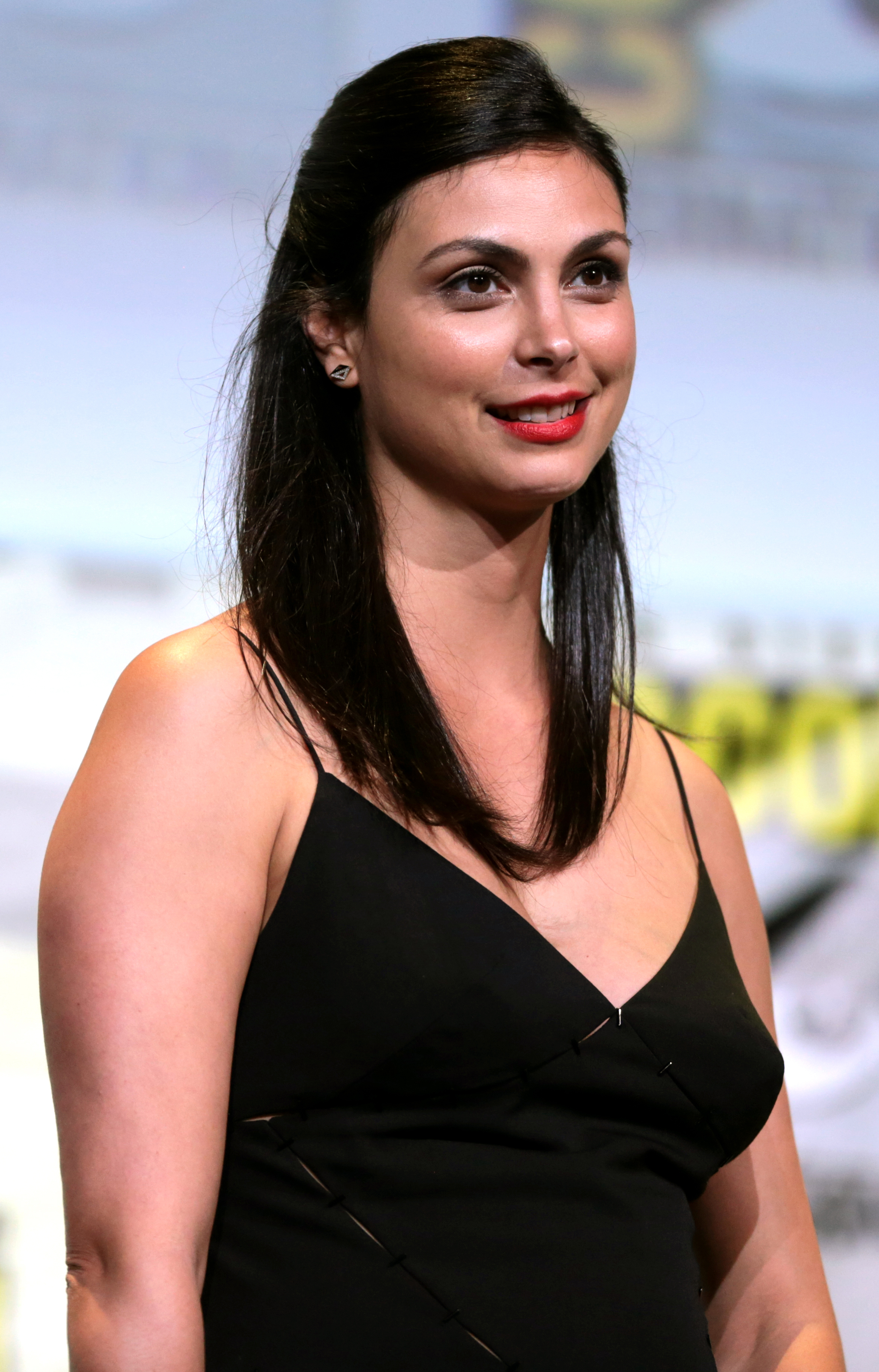
Morena Baccarin

Leslie "Lee" Thompkins (portrayed by Morena Baccarin; main: seasons 2–5; recurring: season 1) is a physician at Arkham Asylum who works in the female ward. After enlisting as a medical examiner at Gotham City Police Department, she enters into a relationship with James Gordon. Proving herself an observant and energetic partner at the GCPD, she often persists in trying to keep actively involved as a means to further Jim's work, making him uncomfortable with potentially endangering her as with Barbara following Cobblepot's return. She is later revealed to be pregnant and Jim proposes to her after Theo Galavan's death. When Gordon was incarcerated at Blackgate, he learned from Harvey that Lee miscarried and that she went south.

When Gordon tracks down Lee outside of Gotham City in order to repair their relationship. However, he discovers that she is engaged to Mario Calvi, the son of the former crime lord Carmine Falcone. However, Gordon made peace with it by the time Lee returned to Gotham with Mario. Gordon and Lee reconciled after Gordon gave his best wishes to Mario. She and Valerie Vale were eventually kidnapped by Jervis Tetch as part of his revenge against Jim Gordon. Tetch then forced Gordon to choose between Lee or Valerie being killed, and after Gordon chooses Lee to be killed, Tetch shoots Valerie instead. It is implied that Gordon knew Tetch would shoot Valerie instead of Lee; as he is still in love with the latter. It is also implied that Lee is still in love with Gordon, despite her being in engaged to Mario Calvi. However, after Mario is infected by the Tetch Virus and shot dead by Gordon, she begins to grow hostile towards Gordon due to grief and rage (mainly because Lee is unwilling/refuses to accept the truth; that Mario tried to kill her when he was infected by Alice Tetch's blood) by doing everything she can to make Gordon uncomfortable.

Due to Gordon refusing to tell her about what's happening in Gotham out of fear that the Court of Owls will take action, Lee resigns from the police department. She later takes a sample of Alice Tetch's blood that Hugo Strange gave James Gordon and injects herself with it. She was eventually cured along with Gordon. She then left Gotham, leaving behind a note saying that while she is not sure if Gotham deserves to be saved, Lee does have hope that Gordon would save the city before reaffirming her love for him.

Lee later appeared at Cherry's fight club working as its doctor when she is called to tend to the burns on Solomon Grundy. She does agree to a partnership with Edward Nygma in order to help her side-job. When Barbara Kean, Tabitha Galavan, and Selina Kyle arrived at Cherry's fight club to look for Edward Nygma, Lee was approached by Barbara Kean where Lee is not pleased with her appearance. She also stated that she does not know who Jim is. When Selina Kyle manages to catch Edward Nygma while Barbara Kean and Tabitha Galavan were busy with their side-agendas, Lee Thompkins suggested a "Code of the Narrows" to pit the champions of both sides against each other for the fate of Edward Nygma. When Firefly crashes the fight to finish the job that Oswald Cobblepot gave her, Riddler witnessed Lee disabling Firefly and Barbara shooting Cherry. While Grundy was having his wounds tended to, Nygma suggests to Lee that she takes the position that Cherry had. Lee takes that suggestion and her first decree was "drinks on the house".

Lee later solves some issues with the inhabitants of the Narrows like dealing with competitive street businesses and even uses mixed medicines and an antidote to get Sampson out of the southern parts of the Narrows.

When Gotham City becomes a no man's land, Lee Thompkins ends up in a mutual stabbing with Riddler. Their bodies are found by Penguin's men as Hugo Strange is instructed to work on them.

In season five, Delta Force found Lee Thompkins in a hideaway in the North Side of Gotham as Eduardo Dorrance plans to use her as a bargaining chip for Riddler. While Gordon fought Eduardo, she shot the soldier that tried to kill her. It was discovered that the same control chip used in Riddler was also in Lee when Theresa Walker triggered it. Gordon struck the area with an electrical lamp snapping Lee out of the mind-control.

Ten years later, Lee is still married to Gordon. She later helps in disarming the bombs that would detonate the newly rebuilt Wayne Tower.

=== Theo Galavan / Azrael ===
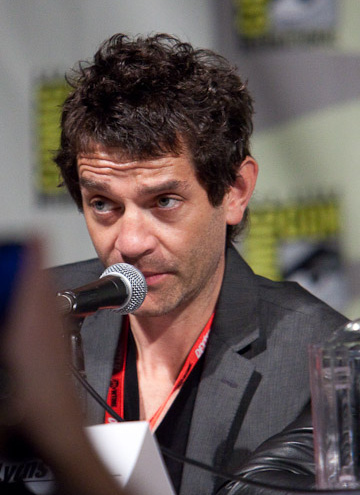
James Frain

Theodore "Theo" Galavan (portrayed by James Frain; season 2) is a charismatic billionaire industrialist whose sister is Tabitha Galavan and whose step-niece is Silver St. Cloud, both of whom do his bidding. He is the main antagonist of the first half of season 2 Rise of the Villains, who's responsible for creating chaos and violence in Gotham City, as part of his master plan to finally carry out a centuries-old vendetta. Galavan's family, originally called the Dumas family, were one of Gotham City's most prominent families and said to have built Gotham City. But the family was ruined financially and socially by the Wayne family after an act of violence was perpetrated by a member of the Dumas family against a member of the Wayne family many years earlier. Those Dumas who remained in Gotham changed their surname to Galavan while those who left joined a religious faction of their family called the Order of St. Dumas.

Theo starts his campaign by orchestrating the abduction of Mayor Aubrey James. As the chairman of the Gotham Chamber of Commerce, he oversaw Gillian Loeb's resignation as police commissioner and Sarah Essen being sworn in as the new police commissioner. Using Zaardon the Soul Reaper, Theo has Tabitha spring Jerome Valeska, Barbara Kean, Aaron Helzinger, Richard Sionis, Robert Greenwood, and Arnold Dobkins from Arkham Asylum to assist him. Sionis was the only one who declined and he had Tabitha kill him to serve as a warning to the others. Theo poses as a caring father figure to Bruce Wayne after ostensibly saving him from Jerome Valeska during a hostage crisis. With Mayor James still missing and Deputy Mayor Harrison Kane dead, Theo then exhorts Oswald Cobblepot into targeting the mayoral candidates by holding Oswald's mother Gertrud hostage while acting like he missed Galavan. While Oswald was successful at killing Janice Caulfield, Victor Zsasz fails at kidnapping Randall Hobbs who drops out of the race. As the only remaining candidate, Theo wins the election, but his true goal is to avenge the Dumas family against the Wayne family. After Tabitha killed Gertrud, Oswald swore revenge on Theo which led to a fight between Cobblepot's group and the police which ended with Oswald getting wounded and Gordon getting suspicious. He is later arrested by Jim Gordon after Mayor James is found alive following Barbara Kean ending up hospitalized. While Gordon and Barnes were searching Galavan's apartment, they did find a cassock behind one of the paintings where they assumed that Galavan had some religious connections. While awaiting trial, Theo reprimanded Tabitha for acting out against his orders and states that his next plan is in motion.

During the trial, Mayor James testifies in court that it was Oswald Cobblepot who abducted him. The judge drops the case against Theo whose henchmen, posing as police officers, abduct Gordon while he was being taken out of the courthouse. With Gordon in his clutches, Galavan stated that the Order of St. Dumas protected his family and that his real surname is Dumas. Galavan toys with Gordon but quickly overpowers him, using some martial arts skills which Theo not previously displayed. He orders his henchmen to kill Gordon slowly and leaves to claim Bruce Wayne's life. During the final battle at Galavan's tower, Tabitha tells Theo he has lost and she is going to look out for herself, saving Silver and Bruce Wayne, as Gordon and Penguin come to the rescue, albeit for very different reasons. Gordon and Cobblepot take him to an isolated place outside Gotham where Cobblepot beats him mercilessly until Gordon stops him and shoots Galavan dead. Cobblepot puts an umbrella in the corpse's mouth to make it look like that he killed Galavan. Galavan's body is then taken to the underground Indian Hill facility.

As Patient 44, he is successfully resurrected by the Indian Hill facility's doctors but the shock of the process scrambled his memories. Strange, inspired by Nygma, misleads Galavan to believe himself to be the order's legendary knight Azrael before sending him after Gordon. During the Gotham City Police Department, Theo has his helmet knocked off, revealing his identity. He manages to use the broken part of the fake Sword of Sin to stab Nathaniel Barnes. As he makes his escape, his face was shown to the reporters as Oswald Cobblepot, Tabitha Galavan, and Bruce Wayne sees it on the news. Theo then began to look for the real Sword of Sin where he confronted Gordon and Bullock at a crypt which ends with Tabitha ending up hospitalised. During the fight with Gordon and Bruce Wayne at Wayne Manor, Azrael is eventually confronted by Cobblepot and then blasted by an RPG wielded by Butch Gilzean, ending his life once and for all. His body become shreds before police can get a DNA variation.

=== Tabitha Galavan ===
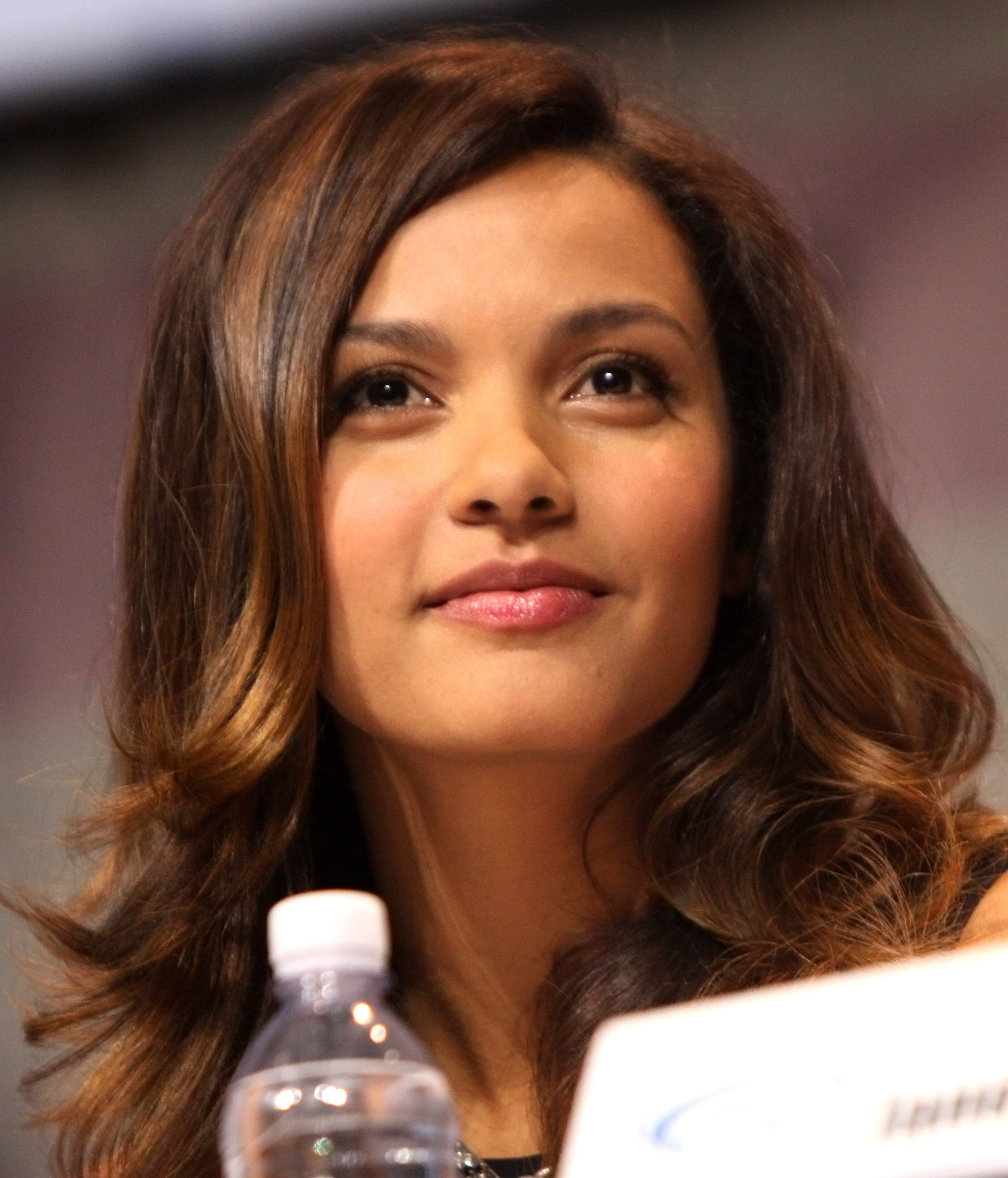
Jessica Lucas

Tabitha Galavan (portrayed by Jessica Lucas; seasons 2–5) is Theo Galavan's whip-wielding, violent, loyal sister and the step-aunt of Silver St. Cloud. She serves as her brother's henchwoman and lead enforcer who gets pleasure from causing mayhem even when it comes to making sure that none of the criminal activities is traced back to her brother, with whom she enjoys an unhealthy relationship. She always wears a cover over her nose and mouth to avoid being identified. She even develops a relationship with Barbara Kean and found a way to reprogram Butch Gilzean to serve Theo. During the fight between Gordon and Kean, Tabitha was shot in the shoulder and managed to escape. When it comes to the battle between Oswald Cobblepot's group and the Order of St. Dumas, Tabitha turns against Theo telling him he has lost and that she needs to look out for herself as she escapes with Silver.

Four weeks later, Tabitha visits Butch Gilzean and becomes his partner while starting a relationship with her. After the warrior Azrael is revealed to be the resurrected Theo Galavan, Tabitha teams up with Gordon and Bullock to find him. After helping Theo regain some of his memory, Theo remembers his mission and stabs Tabitha, resulting in her being hospitalised.

Six weeks after the Indian Hill incident, Tabitha and Barbara started a club called Sirens Nightclub. After Butch was exposed by Edward Nygma as the leader of the new Red Hood gang, Tabitha broke him out of the prison transport bus and took him to a safe house.

After Barbara killed Butch Gilzean, Tabitha fought Barbara at her safe house which ended with Barbara getting electrocuted. Later on, she is approached by Selina Kyle where she states to Tabitha that she is done surviving. Before they begin to work together, Tabitha does allow Selina to test her abilities with her whip.

Tabitha and Selina end up aligning with a revived Barbara. When Barbara, Tabitha, and Selina were sent to Cherry's fight club to find Edward Nygma, Tabitha found Butch Gilzean having transformed into Solomon Grundy where he barely remembers her. When Lee Thompkins calls for the "Code of the Narrows" upon Selina apprehending Nygma, Tabitha (referred to as The Tigress) is paired up against Grundy. Firefly crashes the fight to finish the job that Oswald Cobblepot gave her. Tabitha then witnessed Lee disabling Firefly and Barbara shooting Cherry. Tabitha, Barbara, and Selina later abduct Sofia Falcone upon thinking that she was friends with Cobblepot until she states that she is against Cobblepot. After Victor Zsasz destroys Barbara's club, Tabitha was present when Barbara sides with Sofia Falcone.

Tabitha hears about what happened to Selina Kyle as she assists Barbara, Alfred, and Penguin into fighting Jeremiah Valeska and Ra's al Ghul's men. When Gotham City becomes a no man's land, she finds that Butch is restored. However, Penguin kills him as part of his revenge on Tabitha for what she did to his mother and then shoots her in the leg. When Barbara hears from Tabitha what happened to Butch, they make their territory a female-only territory as they kill the males that were with Ra's al Ghul.

Many days later, Tabitha begins her plot to get revenge on Penguin where she ambushes him and his men in the Lo Boyz' territory. Due to a misfired gun, Tabitha is stabbed by Penguin as Barbara arrives. Her final words before succumbing to her wound are "Barbara don't". This causes Barbara to plan revenge on Penguin.

=== Lucius Fox ===
Lucius Fox (portrayed by Chris Chalk; main: seasons 2–5; guest: season 1) is a junior executive and tech genius at Wayne Enterprises who in the shadow of the company's corrupt activities emerges as a moral beacon for Bruce Wayne as he attempts to help him uphold the legacy of his parents, Thomas and Martha Wayne. Fox was an ally to the Wayne family and one of the few people to know the Waynes were not as corrupt as they had to pretend to be to Wayne Enterprises' board of directors. He first appeared in "The Anvil and the Hammer" where he entered Sid Bunderslaw's office at the time of Bruce Wayne's unexpected visit. Before allowing Bruce to leave Wayne Enterprises, Fox warns Bruce that his father was a very guarded man.

Fox later encountered Alfred at a bar. Alfred convinced Fox to help Bruce Wayne repair a computer that Alfred had wrecked. After Bruce is kidnapped by Theo Galavan, Lucius finishes fixing the computer hard drive and does his part to help the Gotham City Police Department locate Bruce Wayne. He later helps identify "The Philosopher", the man who ordered the Waynes to be killed. He and Bruce are later kidnapped by Hugo Strange but are freed by Selina Kyle afterwards.

Lucius later leaves Wayne Enterprises and becomes a science expert at the Gotham City Police Department.

When Gotham City becomes a no man's land, Lucius is among the GCPD members that remain behind.

Ten years later, Lucius attends the opening of the newly rebuilt Wayne Tower. After Riddler was subdued, Lucius helps Lee in disarming the bomb. He and Alfred later find Penguin and Riddler tied up on a pole by Batman.

=== Butch Gilzean / Cyrus Gold / Solomon Grundy ===
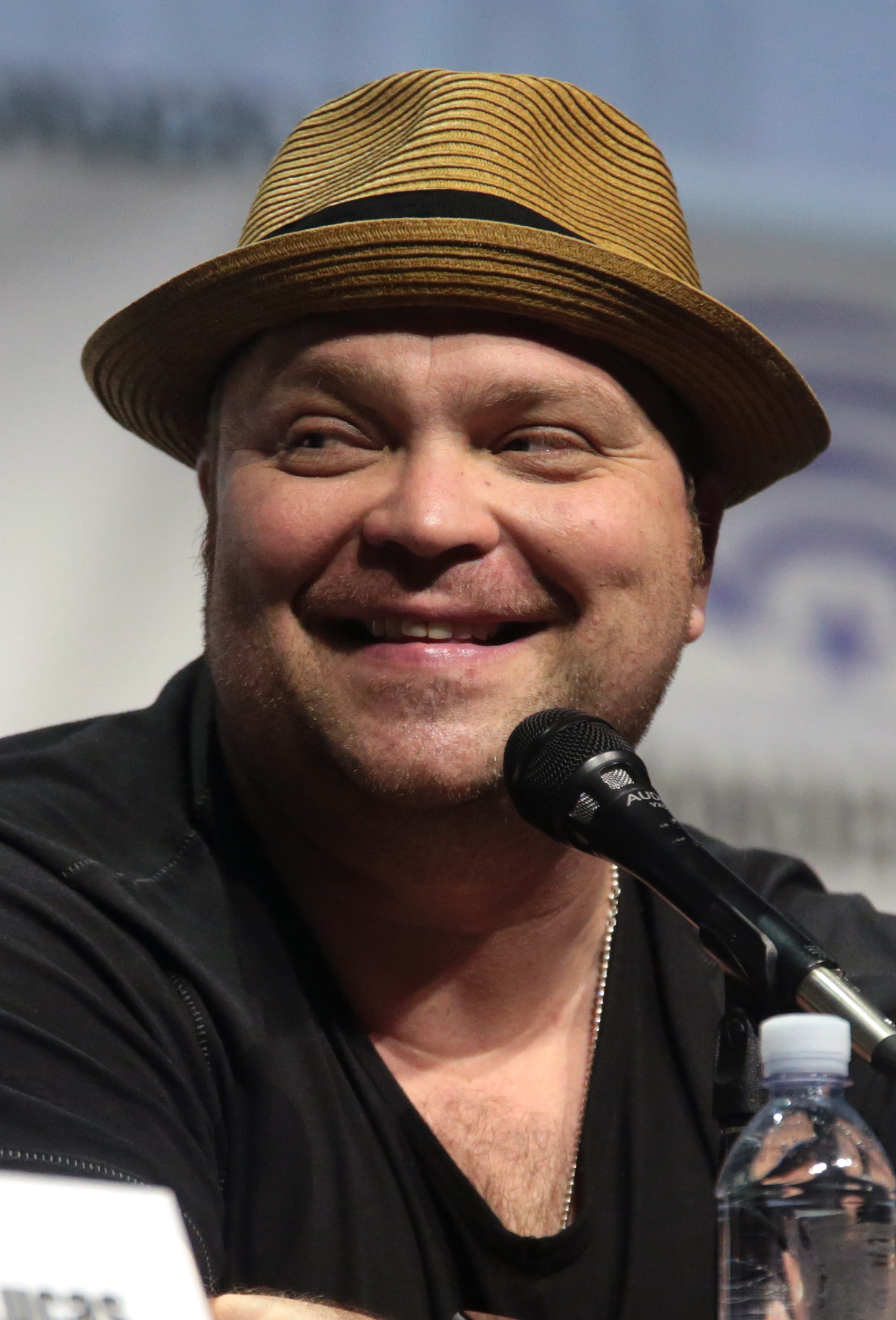
Drew Powell

Butch Gilzean (portrayed by Drew Powell; main: seasons 2–4; recurring: season 1) is Fish Mooney's right-hand man and mob enforcer who is the uncle of Sonny Gilzean. Victor Zsasz brainwashed Butch into obeying Oswald Cobblepot's every command.

To infiltrate Theo Galavan's group, Cobblepot cut off Gilzean's left hand so that Gilzean would win sympathy from the Galavans, who gave Gilzean a new mallet-shaped left hand and other attachments. Tabitha later freed Gilzean from Cobblepot's control.

Four weeks following the death of Theo Galavan, Butch Gilzean rose to power and started a relationship with Tabitha Galavan. After Azrael was revealed to be the resurrected Theo Galavan, Butch and Penguin killed Theo with an RPG. Butch and his gang later accompanied Oswald into going after Hugo Strange. After a resurrected Fish Mooney knocked out Penguin on the street, Butch and his gang fled.

During the man-hunt for Fish Mooney, Gilzean supports Penguin's campaign by paying people to vote for him. He starts to get suspicious with Edward Nygma during his campaign. He realizes that Nygma bought back the money, but Penguin wins regardless, which causes Butch to feel left out while Penguin and Nygma start to work together more. Butch starts being the benefactor of a second version of the Red Hood gang and kills them so he can win back Penguin's approval, but Nygma later exposes him. While being transported on a prison bus, Tabitha breaks him out and takes him to a safe house.

After Isabella was murdered, Nygma put the clues together and claims to Mayor Cobblepot that Butch killed her in revenge on both of them.

As the chaos caused by the Alice Tetch virus is winding down, Butch and Tabitha plan to dispose of Barbara Kean. During the confrontation, Barbara shoots Butch in the head. His body is reviewed by doctors and his birth name is revealed as Cyrus Gold.

When his body is dumped into Slaughter Swamp by the hospital's orderlies, chemicals associated with Indian Hill revived Cyrus Gold while regenerating his hand. The transformation also gave him super-strength while also making him have a fear of fire. He makes his way to Gotham City and runs into Riddler who asks for his help remembering who he is. After getting a burn from one of the men he earlier attacked, Riddler takes him to Cherry's nightclub to enter him in a fight where Cherry has her latest doctor Lee Thompkins tend to his burn. Solomon Grundy manages to win most of his death matches.

During his fight with Mr. Murder Face, Solomon Grundy started experiencing fragments of memories of his life as Butch Gilzean upon being hit in the head. When Barbara Kean, Tabitha Galavan, and Selina Kyle arrived at Cherry's fight club to find Edward Nygma, Tabitha encountered Grundy, who does not remember him. When Selina calls for the "Code of the Narrows" while trying to apprehend Nygma, Tabitha is paired up against Grundy. Firefly crashes the fight to finish the job that Oswald Cobblepot gave her. Grundy prepares to attack only to be frightened by Firefly's fire attacks. After Firefly was disabled by Lee Thompkins and Barbara Kean shot Cherry, Grundy's injuries were tended to by Lee.

Penguin later instructs Hugo Strange to restore Butch Gilzean back to normal. While Strange was successful, Penguin kills Butch anyway as part of his revenge on Tabitha for killing his mother.

=== Harvey Dent ===
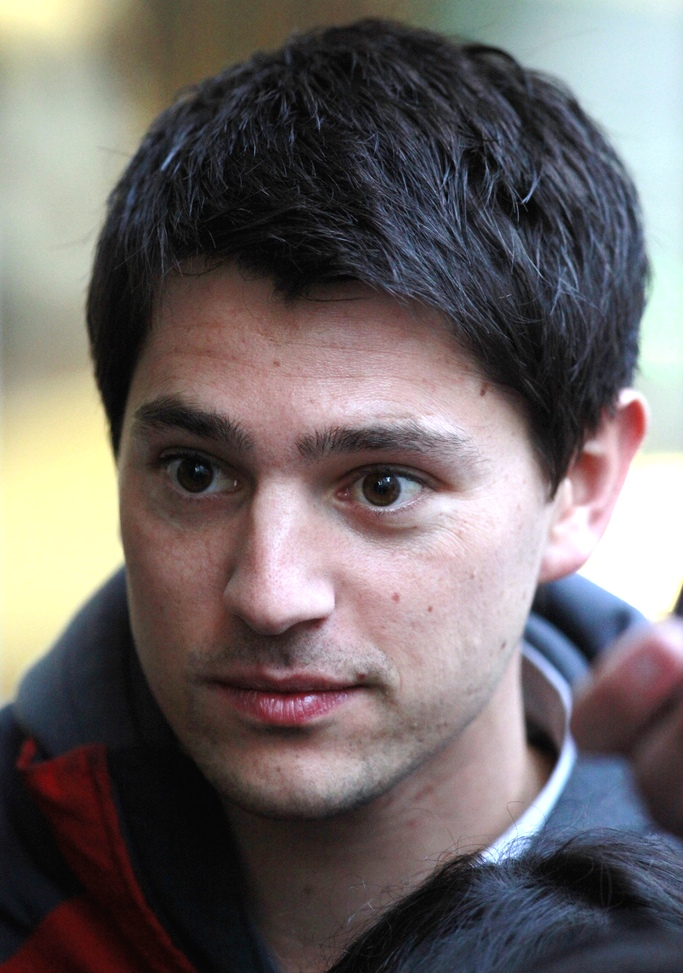
Nicholas D'Agosto

Harvey Dent (portrayed by Nicholas D'Agosto; main: season 2; guest: season 1) is a "handsome, warm and engaging" Assistant District Attorney. He works with Gordon to find the man who killed Thomas and Martha Wayne. At one point he accuses billionaire Dick Lovecraft of involvement in the Wayne murders. He further accuses him of sending the assassins to kill Bruce Wayne and Selina Kyle, but Gordon and Bullock discover that he was not responsible. Soon afterward, Lovecraft is killed by the same assassins. Dent also helps Gordon and Bullock investigate the corrupt acts of Commissioner Gillian B. Loeb regarding the release of corrupt Narcotics Officer Arnold Flass.

Harvey Dent was initially a supporter of Theo Galavan's candidacy for mayor of Gotham, but following Gordon's discovery of Galavan's true machinations and his arrest, he became the prosecutor at Theo Galavan's trial where Aubrey James fearfully told him that Oswald Cobblepot was the one who abducted him and not Theo Galavan.

Along with Captain Nathaniel Barnes, Harvey later questioned Jim about his role in Theo's death.

When Gordon was framed for the death of police officer Carl Pinkney and sentenced to Blackgate Penitentiary, the news reporter stated that Harvey Dent could not be reached for a comment. After Warden Carlson Grey moved Gordon into Blackgate Penitentiary's F-Wing, Bullock calls up Dent telling him what happened and to do everything he can to get Gordon out like either a transfer to another prison, a retrial, or reopening the case.

=== Nathaniel Barnes / Executioner ===
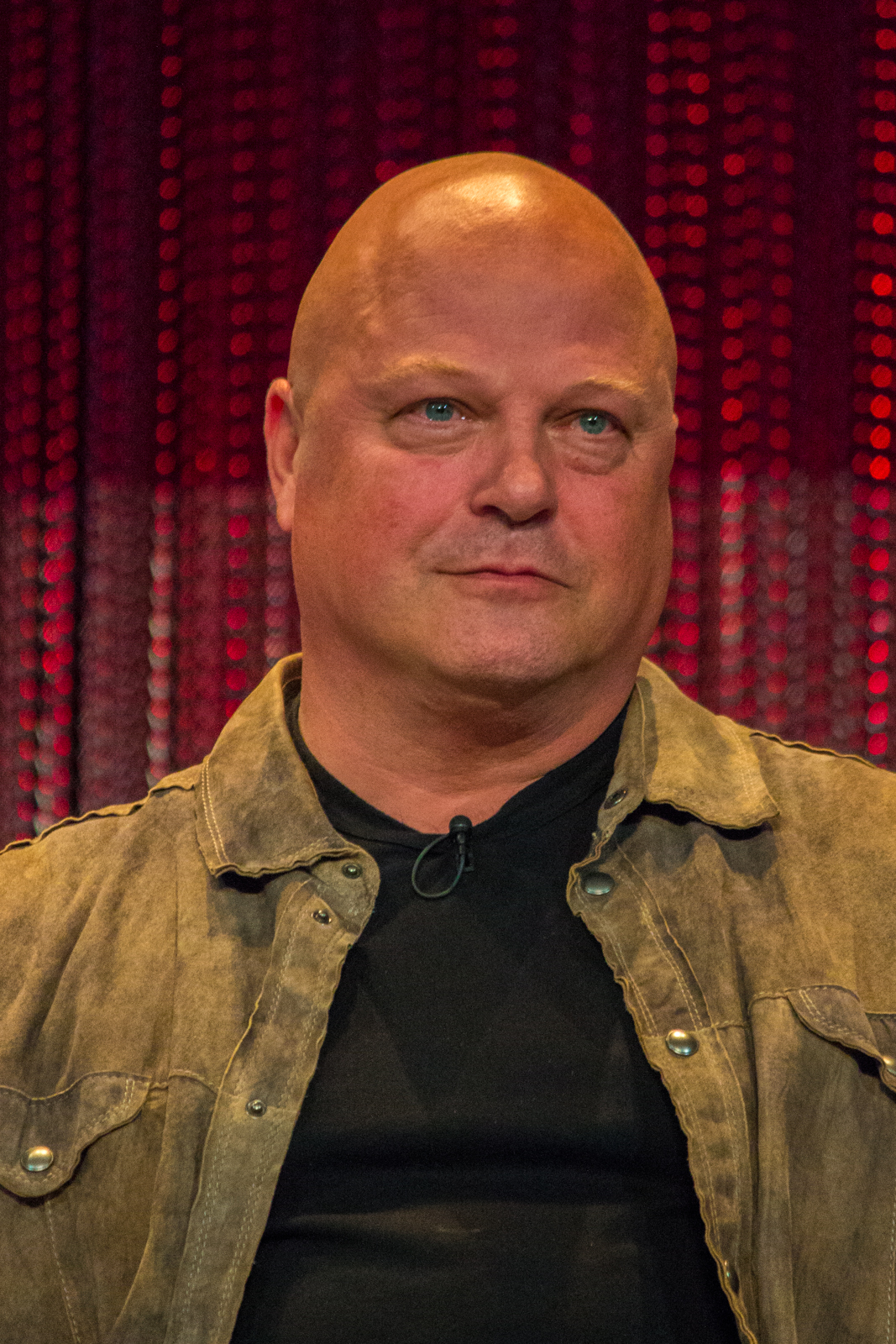
Michael Chiklis

Nathaniel Barnes (portrayed by Michael Chiklis; season 2–3), a tough, no-nonsense martinet of a police captain at Gotham City Police Department after the death of Sarah Essen, he serves a strong ally to James Gordon, but will one day become Gordon's enemy. Unafraid to make such enemies, Barnes is a strict "law and order zealot". He first appears when he dismisses Officers Pollard, Guthrie, Coulson, Drowler, Brooks, and Hightower and Detective Perez for corruption, bribery, drug abuse, racketeering, and extortion. Nathaniel promotes Gordon to his second-in-command as they start a Strike Team made up of the graduates from the Gotham City Police Academy.

In "Rise of the Villains: A Bitter Pill to Swallow", it was revealed that Nathaniel once served in the United States Marine Corps. After Gordon becomes a fugitive for punching Theo Galavan in court after being found innocent, Barnes attempts to arrest Gordon after the battle with the Order of Saint Dumas but is knocked out by Cobblepot.

After Cobblepot was apprehended and backed up Gordon's claim, Barnes told Gordon not to make a fool out of him. When Jim was framed for the murder of Carl Pinkney at the hands of Edward Nygma, Barnes believed that Jim committed the crime and the judge sentenced him to Blackgate Penitentiary. After Jim was proven innocent and Nygma was arrested upon the police being in the listening distance of Nygma's confession, Barnes apologised and told Jim he owed him a favour. He also gave Jim the remaining Wayne files and Lee's number. During Azrael's attack on the Gotham City Police Department, Barnes fought Azrael on the roof which led to Azrael's mask coming off and Barnes getting stabbed by Azrael. This led to Barnes being hospitalised.

While still recuperating, Nathaniel initiates a manhunt for Fish Mooney and the Indian Hill escapees, which ends with Fish and Strange fleeing Gotham and the rest of the minions being burned to death by an angry mob.

Later, Barnes is infected with Alice Tetch's poisonous blood that dropped onto him. He then goes on a vigilante spree killing criminals until he is subjected by James Gordon and remanded to Arkham Asylum while in a straitjacket. While incarcerated at Arkham, Barnes keeps screaming "Guilty!".

Lee Thompkins later talks to Nathaniel Barnes about the blood he is infected with that also infected Mario Calvic. Barnes calls it a gift and states that when he gets out of Arkham, he is going to bathe the corruption of Gotham City in blood, starting with Jim Gordon's.

Barnes is taken to a private lab owned by the Court of Owls where Kathryn had Hugo Strange extract Alice Tetch's poisonous blood from him. After James Gordon used Penguin to interfere with the Court of Owls' plans to use the weaponized blood on a Daughters of Gotham event, Kathryn cuts a deal with Nathaniel Barnes to dispose of Gordon. With a special outfit and an axe-tipped glove, Nathaniel Barnes targets James Gordon. During the fight at the Gotham City Police Department, Nathaniel Barnes beheads Kathryn and has his left hand shot off by James Gordon. Even though Barnes was detained, Alvarez told Gordon and Bullock that Barnes escaped from the Arkham Asylum transport upon killing the three guards.

=== Ivy "Pamela" Pepper ===
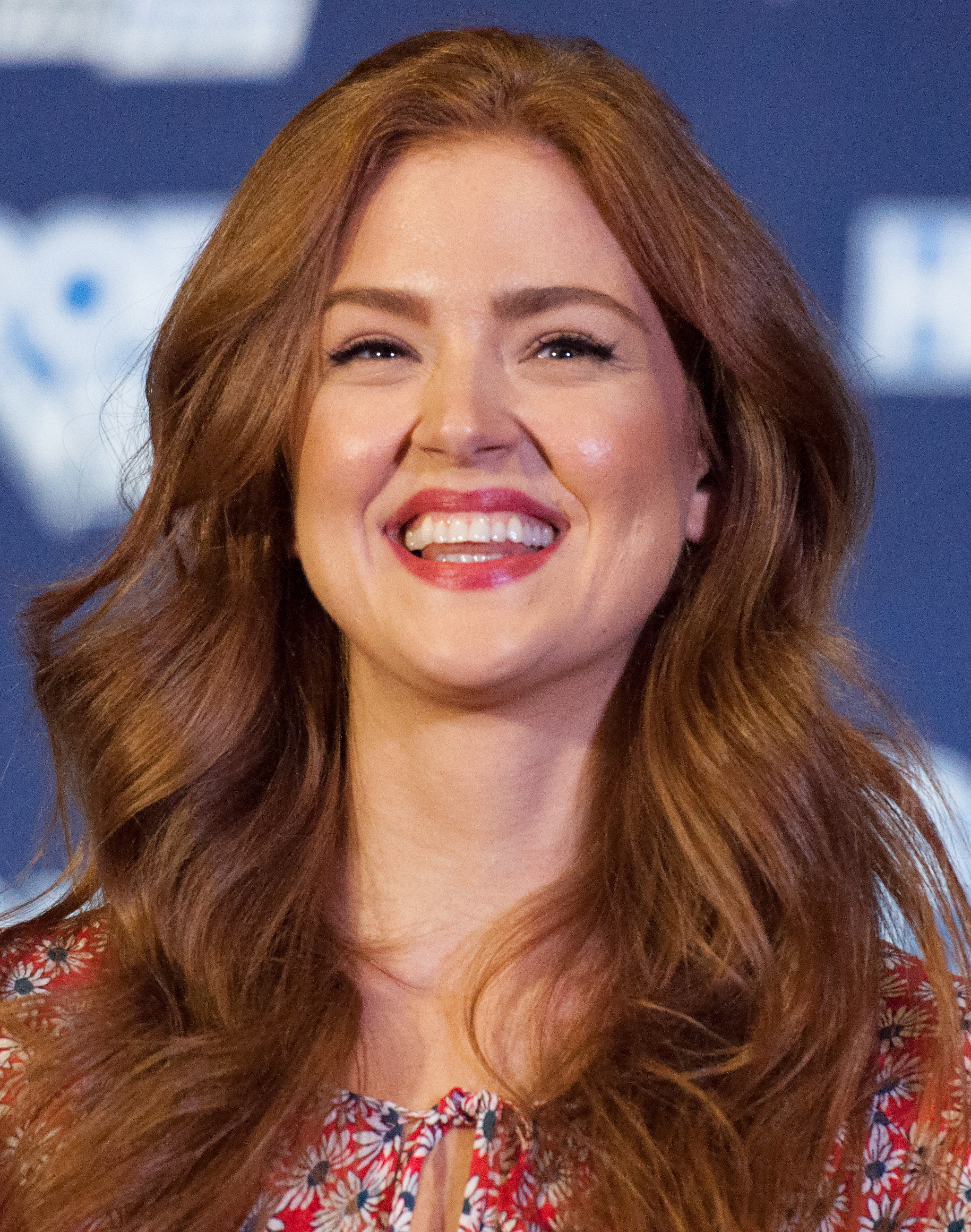
Maggie Geha

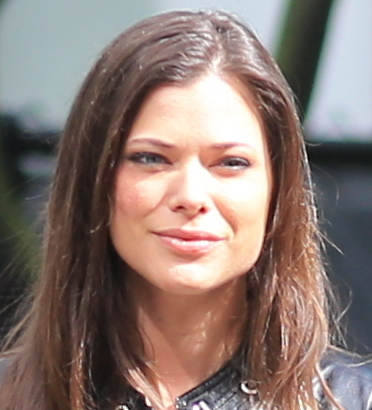
Peyton List

Ivy Pepper (portrayed by Clare Foley; recurring: season 1; guest: seasons 2–3; Maggie Geha; main: season 3; guest: season 4; Peyton List; guest: seasons 4–5) is a young vegan girl who is the abused daughter of Mario Pepper (who was framed for the Wayne murders). She enjoys tending to her plants.

After her mother committed suicide sometime after her father's death, Ivy is adopted by a foster family and renamed Pamela, but runs away from their home and lives on the streets while maintaining contact with Selina Kyle. Like Selina Kyle, Ivy Pepper has befriended Barbara Kean.

Ivy later works for Sonny Gilzean where she grows his "magic mushrooms" to sell on the streets.

After an encounter with a Bruce Wayne look-a-like, Ivy gets caught by Fish Mooney's minion Nancy while trying to warn Selina. After Selina fails to vouch for her, Ivy is then chased by Fish Mooney's minion Marv. After being briefly touched by Marv, Ivy falls into the drain pipe and is swept away by the current.

The effects of Marv's brief touch causes Ivy to turn into an adult enough to outgrow her clothes by the time she awakens on the shore of the river. She later obtains the clothes belonging to the ex-wife of the man who found her where she knocked out offscreen for neglecting his plants.

At some point, Ivy takes refuge in an abandoned house that has a greenhouse. After Oswald Cobblepot was shot by Edward Nygma, Ivy Pepper nurses him back to good health and helps to dispose of Gabe and those who came with them by having them buried in her garden of moving plants. Ivy then persuades Oswald Cobblepot to let her help in his plans to get revenge on Edward Nygma by stating that they will need an army of freaks. The two of them managed to get Victor Fries and Bridgit Pike on their side. Upon hearing what happened to Selina Kyle, Ivy Pepper uses her special perfume to control the nurses into bringing plants into Selina's room. When Selina finally was awoken, Ivy was against her plan to go to Wayne Manor.

Following the chaos caused by the Alice Tetch virus, Ivy Pepper assists Oswald Cobblepot in the development of the Iceberg Lounge. She starts to feel neglected and goes to an apothecary where she consumes some chemicals held in the owner's safe. She then transforms a third time and gains the ability to be more connected to plant life, with a scratch from her poisoning people and causing them to essentially become a human plant. Ivy plans to wipe out the city with her plants, but is stopped by Selina before taking off. Ivy becomes a fugitive and also becomes known as Poison Ivy.

When Gotham City is declared a "no man's land," Ivy Pepper takes refuge in Robinson Park. After she was freed from a salt trap by Bruce, Ivy stated that the plants in Robinson Park are feeding off anyone that enters. She gives Bruce a plant that successfully heals Selina's spinal injury.

Ivy later controls Victor Zsasz into wounding James Gordon. Then she brings the Mutant Leader to have a revenge match against Selina Kyle while she mesmerizes Bruce to take her to the factory that is helping to decontaminate the river so that Lucius can deactivate the machines there. Mesmerizing a police officer, Ivy frees Zsasz to buy her some time to finish off Gordon. She fought against Lee Thompkins. Although Lee shot Ivy, she managed to get away while Zsasz was subdued by Harvey Bullock.

=== Jervis Tetch / Mad Hatter ===
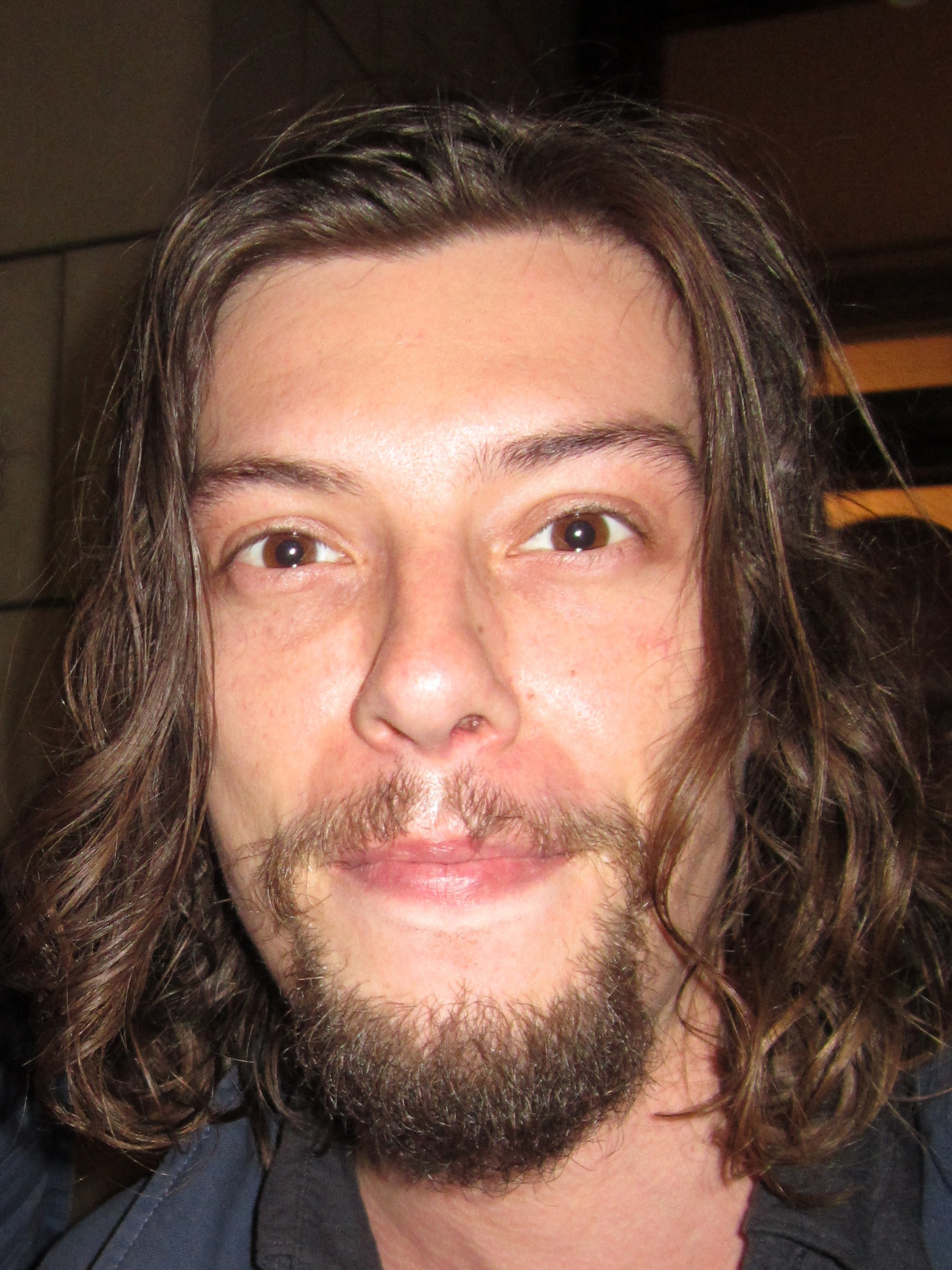
Benedict Samuel

Jervis Tetch (portrayed by Benedict Samuel; main: season 3; recurring: season 4; guest: season 5) is a talented hypnotist teetering on the edge of madness. He arrives in Gotham with an unwavering desire to find his sister Alice, a young woman who went missing in the city years ago. It is heavily implied that Jervis has sexual feelings for his sister.

After hypnotizing a doctor during a show at the Sirens, he has him kill his wife and then himself in order to get his residence. Jervis approaches James Gordon to help find Alice. Following his hypnosis on Barbara Kean during another show at The Sirens, Gordon visits him again where he starts to ask about Alice's condition. Jervis ends up hypnotizing him. Before he can have Gordon jump off the roof of The Sirens, Jervis is attacked by Alice who does not want to go with him with the resulting fight snapping Gordon out of his hypnosis. After Jervis escapes, Alice is handcuffed by Gordon. Alice later reveals that Jervis controlled most of Alice when they were kids, and put thoughts in her head that "no brother should have".

Later, Tetch hires the wrestlers known as the "Tweedle Brothers" to break Alice out of the GCPD. While Jervis, Dumfree, and Deever made off with Alice, the other two Tweeds were killed and the youngest of them was placed in police custody. Jervis then dressed Alice in the Alice costume from "Alice in Wonderland" and tries to have a tea party with her and the two remaining Tweedle Brothers, telling Alice that she is the only thing in his life keeping him from going mad. Gordon and Harvey arrive and a fight ensues. When Alice tries to escape, she accidentally falls on a pipe, impaling her. A devastated Tetch flees the scene.

Jervis Tetch later uses the Red Queen plant on Jim Gordon to incapacitate him. Then he crashes the Gotham City Founders' Dinner presided over by Mayor Oswald Cobblepot in order to make them drink the tainted water. His plans are thwarted by the Gotham City Police Department as Jervis starts to see some of his sister in Nathaniel Barnes due to him being infected with her blood. Jervis, Dumfree Tweed, and Deever Tweed are arrested and remanded to Arkham Asylum.

Jervis Tetch later witnessed the Court of Owls obtaining Nathaniel Barnes. Lee Thompkins later visited Jervis at Arkham Asylum to know if he infected Mario Calvi. Jervis stated that he did it after seeing how Gordon look at her the day he wounded Valerie Vale and states that she is to blame for Mario's suffering.

The transport carrying Jervis Tetch was later intercepted by Butch Gilzean and Tabitha Galavan so that Barbara Kean can hold him for ransom. After being freed by Gordon, Jervis was drained of some of his blood with the part the blood came from being patched up. It was later mentioned by Harvey Bullock that the doctors patched Jervis back up and had him shipped back to Arkham Asylum. He is referred to as the Mad Hatter by Penguin after he escapes from Arkham with Jerome and his Legion of Horribles.

In season five, Jeremiah Valeska enlisted Mad Hatter to help Ecco oversee the chemical production at Ace Chemicals by hypnotizing some people to work at Ace Chemicals. When Gordon and Lee came across this operation, Mad Hatter unleashed his hypnotized slaves on them as Ecco subdues Gordon. Under orders from Jeremiah Valeska, Mad Hatter hypnotized them to pass off as Thomas and Martha Wayne near the Monarch Theater where they will be freed from the hypnotism when Jeremiah shooting them will cause the pearls to fall off Lee. Jeremiah's shooting plot was thwarted by Selina.

=== Ra's al Ghul ===
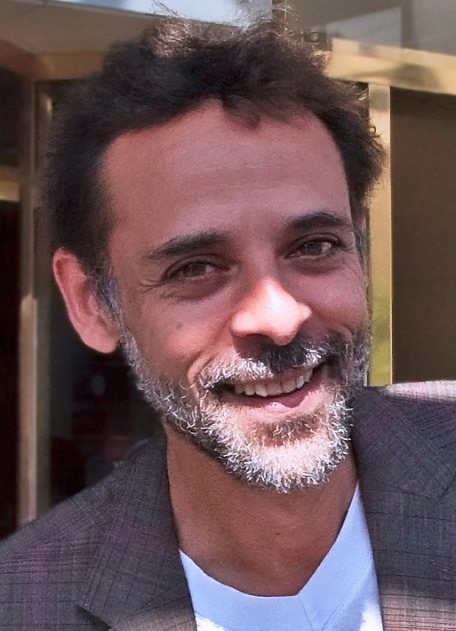
Alexander Siddig

Ra's al Ghul (portrayed by Alexander Siddig; main: season 4; guest: season 3) is the enigmatic person behind the Court of Owls' activities and leader of the League of Shadows. With a past shrouded in mystery, the powerful supervillain uses cunning and deception to lay waste to his foes. His identity is foreshadowed upon the death of Shaman who works for Ra's al Ghul. When Bruce Wayne meets Ra's al Ghul in the bowels of the Yuyan Building, Ra's al Ghul mentioned that he wanted Bruce to be his heir and does a final test where he wants him to kill Alfred Pennyworth. After Bruce stabs Alfred, he angrily tries to attack Ra's al Ghul who gets away where he advises to Bruce to use the Lazarus Pit's waters to heal Alfred.

Siddig was promoted to a series regular for season 4. During this time, it is revealed that he had revived Barbara Kean through the Lazarus Pit and is seeking a specific embalming knife.

After killing Niles Winthrop and later Alex Winthrop in front of Bruce and Gordon, Ra's al Ghul surrenders and is remanded to Blackgate Penitentiary to await trial. While also transferring some of his energy to a visiting Barbara, Ra's al Ghul also had some of his men infiltrate Blackgate Penitentiary by posing as the prison guards. After doing a threat to Bruce Wayne to return to bother him when he starts a family, Bruce reluctantly uses the embalming knife on Ra's al Ghul which reduces him to a skeleton just as Gordon and Alfred arrive. Gordon came up with a cover story that Ra's al Ghul's men infiltrated the prison and made off with him.

The League of Shadows members that were loyal to Ra's al Ghul used a ritual that involved Bruce Wayne's blood to bring Ra's al Ghul to life when they think that Barbara is not living up to her potential. Following a duel where her abilities show her different outcomes like her getting stabbed or Tabitha's neck getting slit, Barbara relinquishes the abilities which fully restores Ra's al Ghul. Afterwards, he later pays a visit to Bruce when Selina is around where he states that an upcoming fire in Gotham City will shape him into a Dark Knight... if it does not consume him first.

After Ra's al Ghul's men help Jeremiah Valeska abduct Bruce in order to further his destiny, Ra's al Ghul and Jeremiah come into conflict with Alfred Pennyworth, Barbara Kean, Penguin, and Tabitha Galavan. Barbara manipulates Bruce's hand into using the reforged embalming knife to stab Ra's al Ghul again. As Gotham City starts to become a no man's land, Ra's al Ghul advises Bruce in his dying breath to embrace his destiny.

=== Sofia Falcone ===
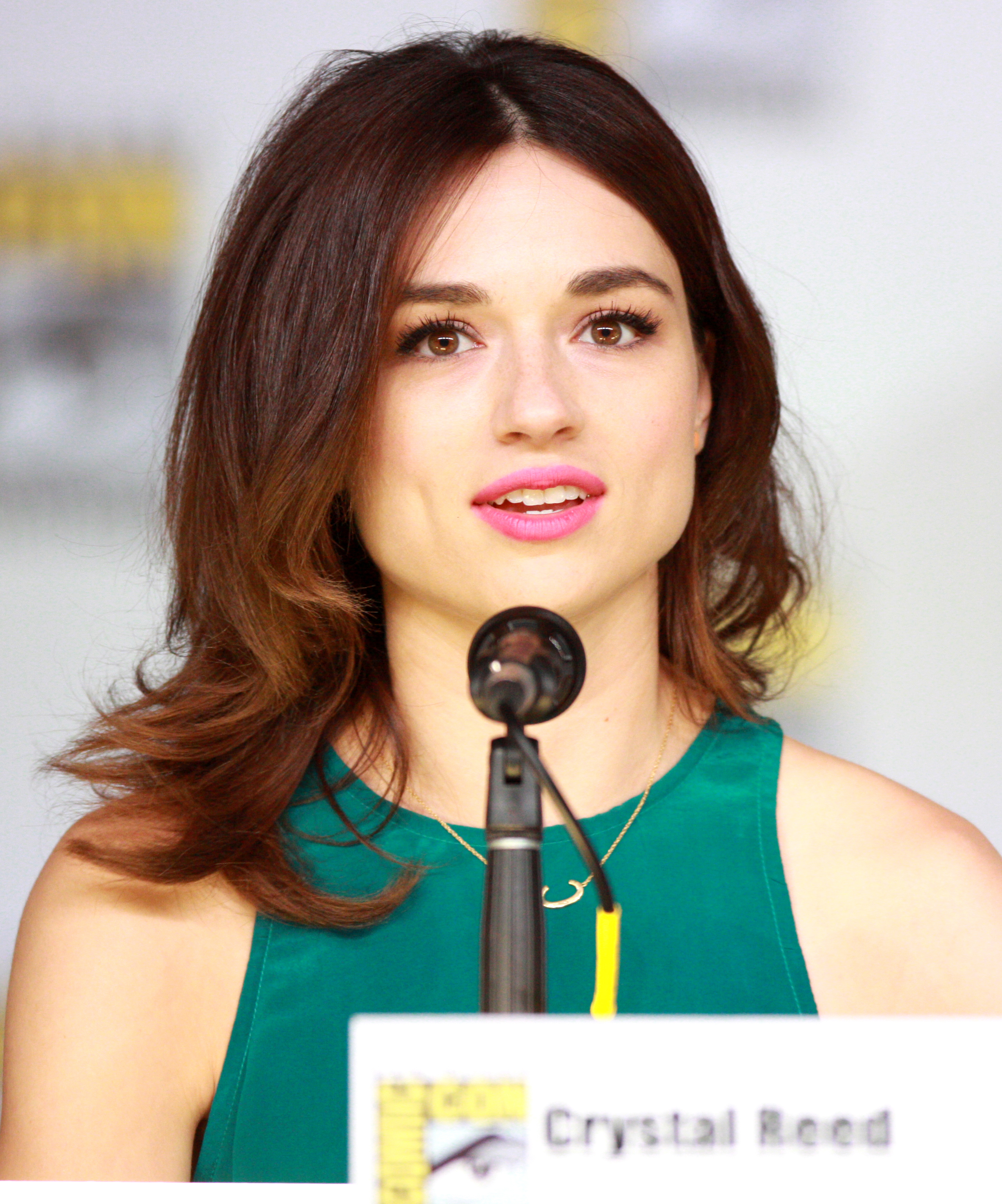
Crystal Reed

Sofia Falcone (portrayed by Crystal Reed; season 4), the only daughter of Carmine Falcone and the sister of Mario Calvi. She is a strong, intelligent and calculating woman who has run the Falcone operation in the south for the past 10 years and is returning to Gotham to help Gordon take down the Penguin.

Reed joined as a series regular for season 4. When James Gordon visits Carmine Falcone to ask for his help in dealing with Oswald Cobblepot, Sofia wanted to take over her father's business to which Carmine would not let her. She ends up secretly following Gordon back to Gotham City to do so anyway.

Sofia started by meeting with Mayor Burke and the zoning commissioner where she established the Falcone Home and School for Orphans.

Following Professor Pyg's attack, Cobblepot had the Dentist torture her but bluffed her way out. She is then abducted by Barbara Kean, Tabitha Galavan, and Selina Kyle where they think she is allies with Cobblepot. Sofia tells them that she is against Cobblepot and her point is proven when Victor Zsasz shows up outside of Barbara's lair with a rocket launcher that destroys the lair. Following the confrontation with Cobblepot, Sofia persuades Barbara's group to ally with her.

During a gunfight with Gordon when targeting Arthur Penn, Sofia is shot by Lee Thompkins and slips into a coma.

=== Thomas Wayne ===
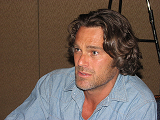
Grayson McCouch

Thomas Wayne (portrayed by Ben Aldridge, Pennyworth; Grayson McCouch, Gotham), the CEO of Wayne Enterprises who is the husband of Martha Wayne and the father of Bruce and Samantha Wayne. He and his wife murdered by a masked assailant after a phony mugging. Their deaths motivate James Gordon into finding the man responsible. In "The Anvil or the Hammer", it is revealed by Sid Bunderslaw that Thomas Wayne and his father had kept quiet about the illegal activities at Wayne Enterprises. In "Pinewood", it's revealed that Thomas started the program known as Pinewood, but after Hugo Strange took over, Thomas tried to shut it down, resulting in Strange hiring Patrick Malone to kill the Waynes. In Pennyworth, Thomas' youth as a CIA asset is explored, as well as marrying Martha and having their first child before Bruce, Samantha Thomas Wayne.

=== Martha Wayne ===
Martha Wayne (portrayed by Emma Paetz, Pennyworth; Brette Taylor, Gotham), the wife of Thomas Wayne and the mother of Bruce and Samantha Wayne. In Gotham, she and Thomas were killed by a masked assailant after he mugged them; in Pennyworth, she bonds with the younger Alfred while marrying Thomas and bearing their first child before Bruce, Samantha.

== Recurring characters ==
=== Introduced in season 1 ===
==== Aubrey James ====
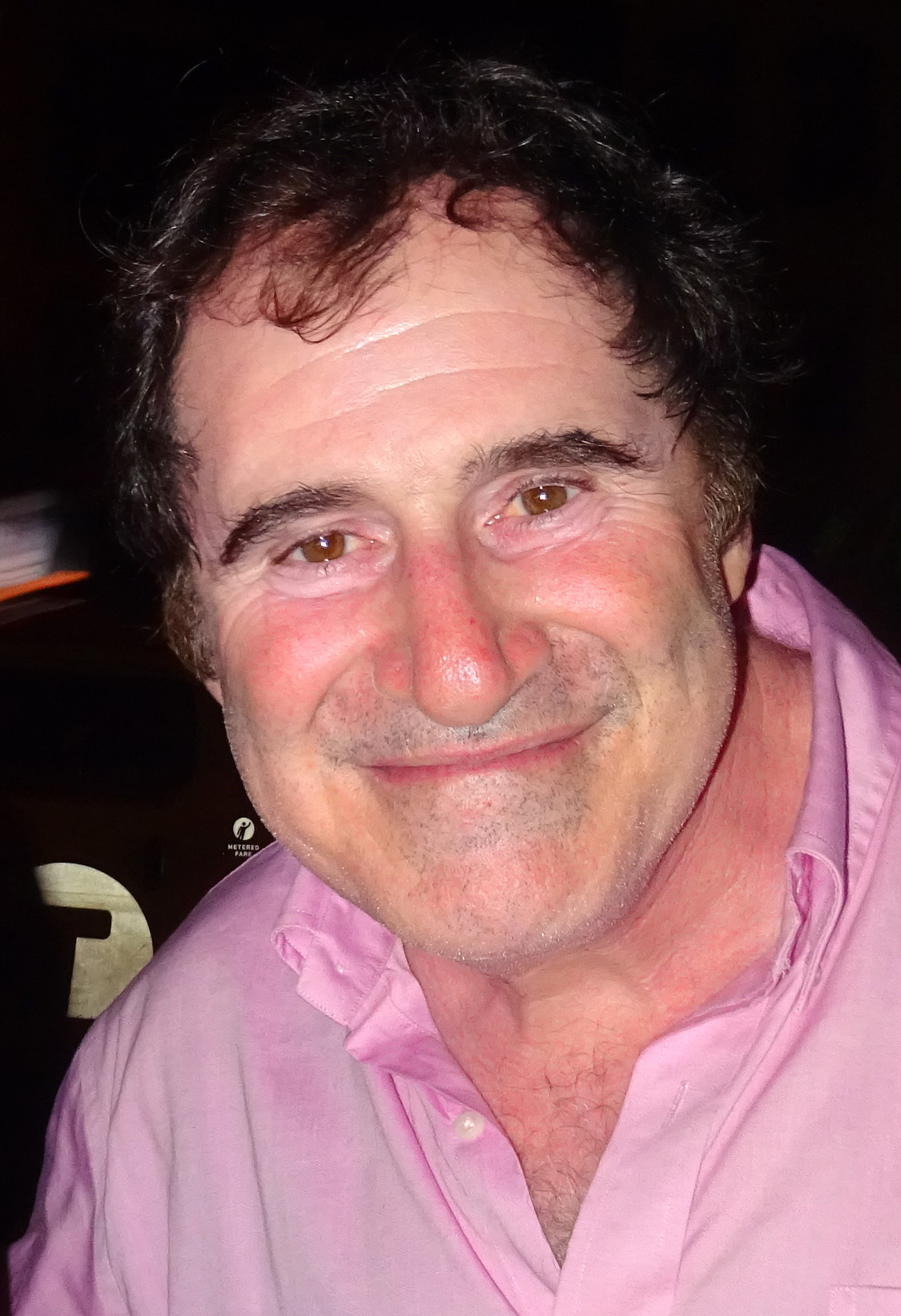
Richard Kind

Aubrey James (portrayed by Richard Kind) is the Mayor of Gotham City who is in Carmine Falcone's pocket and is also revealed to do what the Court of Owls says. Superficially congenial, he is indifferent and contemptuous of most of Gotham's citizens and ruthless towards anyone who would endanger his political standing and criminal associations.

Following Falcone's retirement, James is later held captive by Theo Galavan in an elaborate scheme of Galavan's in order for Galavan to become the new mayor. Sometime later, James is found at a safehouse in China Docks, which leads to Galavan's arrest. At Galavan's trial, James fearfully testifies that Galavan did not abduct him but rather that Oswald Cobblepot was responsible.

James later assists Nathaniel Barnes at a press conference where they state that they have no knowledge if Wayne Enterprises is connected with Indian Hill. At another press conference, James states that the elected Gotham City Officials have been running Gotham City since Theo Galavan's death and want him to be reinstated as the Mayor of Gotham City. Oswald Cobblepot crashes the press conference, stating that he challenges James for that role after driving out the "abominations" that plagued their city. Later, Oswald is elected the new mayor of Gotham. When Oswald goes missing, a news report states that the elected Gotham City Officials have reinstated Aubrey James. He is briefly held hostage by the Riddler in order to get the Court of Owls' identity out of him. During the chaos caused by the Alice Tetch virus, it is mentioned that Mayor Aubrey James has called in the National Guard to help. Sometime later, Aubrey James is succeeded by Burke.

Ten years later, Aubrey James is mayor again, and he is dismayed that Gordon wants to resign. He is later captured by the Riddler as part of his employer's plot to bomb the newly rebuilt Wayne Tower. Barbara and Selina rescue him, and the police get the mayor to safety and remove the bombs on him.

==== Gertrud Kapelput ====
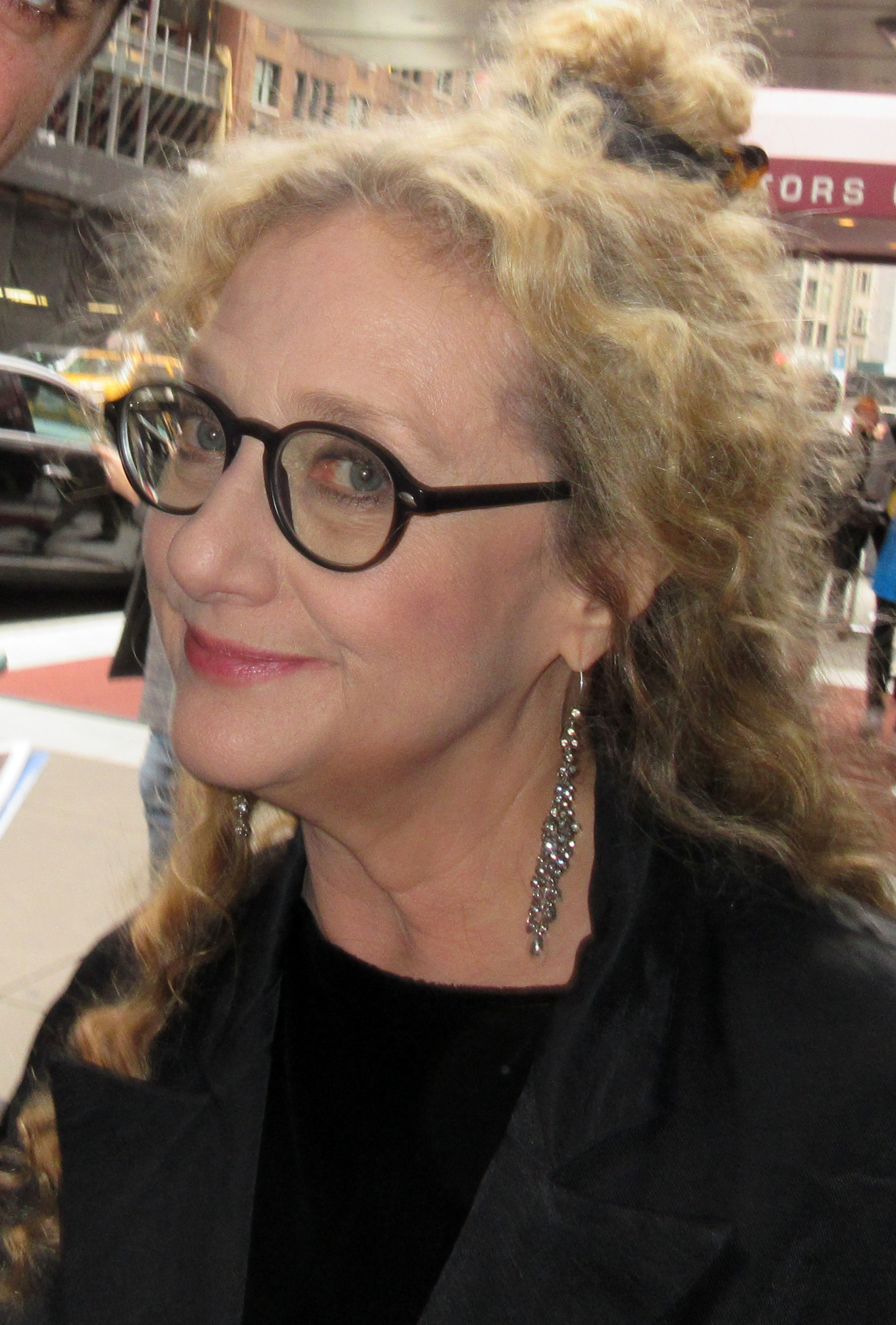
Carol Kane

Gertrud Kapelput (portrayed by Carol Kane) is the overly possessive, heavily accented mother of Oswald Cobblepot. In her earlier life, she was the cook for Elijah Van Dahl's parents where they fell in love which Elijah's parents disapproved. Even though Elijah stood up to his parents, Gertrud was already gone and she later gave birth to Oswald. She and her son share an unusually close bond. Gertrud is responsible for Oswald's desires to move up in the world, claiming it's his birthright.

She is later held captive by Theo Galavan so that Penguin could help him in his goals. Although Oswald Cobblepot persuades Theo to have his mother freed in exchange that he continues to work for him, Gertrud is stabbed in the back by Tabitha Galavan. Before dying from her wounds, Gertrud learns more about Oswald's activities and still considers her son a good boy.

==== Sal Maroni ====
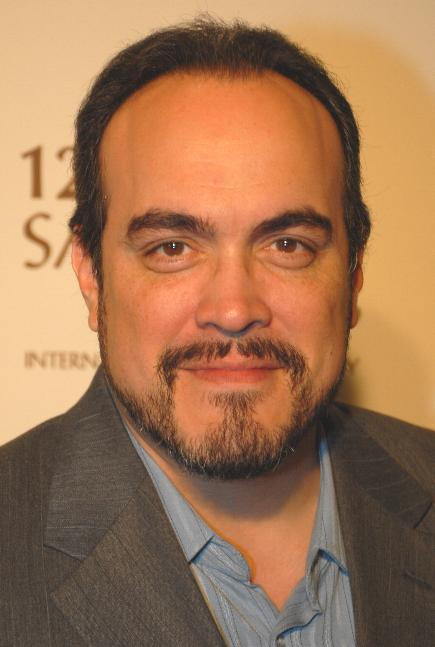
David Zayas

Salvatore Maroni (portrayed by David Zayas) is the owner of a local Italian restaurant that serves as a front for his crime family. Maroni takes an interest in one of his employees, petty criminal Oswald Cobblepot, promoting him to manager and using him as a source of information on Falcone's operations; he is unaware that Cobblepot is secretly an informant for Falcone. When Jack Buchinsky targets Maroni for abandoning him years ago during a heist, he and his associates seek refuge in the GCPD. There, he begins to suspect Cobblepot's duplicity when he deliriously stammers about meeting Falcone. When Falcone's lieutenant Fish Mooney goes into exile from Gotham City, she contacts Maroni and informs him of Cobblepot's deception, resulting in Maroni interrogating Cobblepot into confessing the truth, and eventually attempting to have him executed in a junkyard car compactor. When Cobblepot manages to escape and obtains Falcone's protection, Maroni and Falcone make a deal: Maroni will get rid of one of Falcone's enemies and Cobblepot will stay out of his territory. Maroni appears at the newly christened "Oswald's" nightclub to tell his former associate that he is safe for now, but that he will perish as soon as Falcone dies. Maroni also tries to ruin Cobblepot's business by cutting off his liquor supplies. Cobblepot then sends a hitman to one of Maroni's establishments to tell Maroni that Falcone wants him dead. Cobblepot sabotages his own hit in order to ignite a turf war between Maroni and Falcone. In the season finale "All Happy Families Are Alike", Mooney takes Falcone, Cobblepot, James Gordon, and Harvey Bullock prisoner where she intends to kill them all in exchange for Sal Maroni returning all her old territories back to her. While Mooney wants an equal partnership, however, Maroni insists on her being his second-in-command. When Maroni belittles Mooney with sexist nicknames, she turns on him and shoots him in the head before slaughtering his gang.

==== Jennifer Luree ====
Jennifer Luree (portrayed by Krista Braun) is a reporter in Gotham City who appears as a minor character, usually seen narrating important events and happenings in Gotham City. She is a recurring character appearing in all five seasons.

==== Frankie Carbone ====
Frankie Carbone (portrayed by Danny Mastrogiorgio) is the chief enforcer and a made man in the Maroni Crime Family. He is later killed by Oswald Cobblepot, Gabriel, and an unnamed former Maroni crime family member who is on Oswald's side.

==== Liza ====
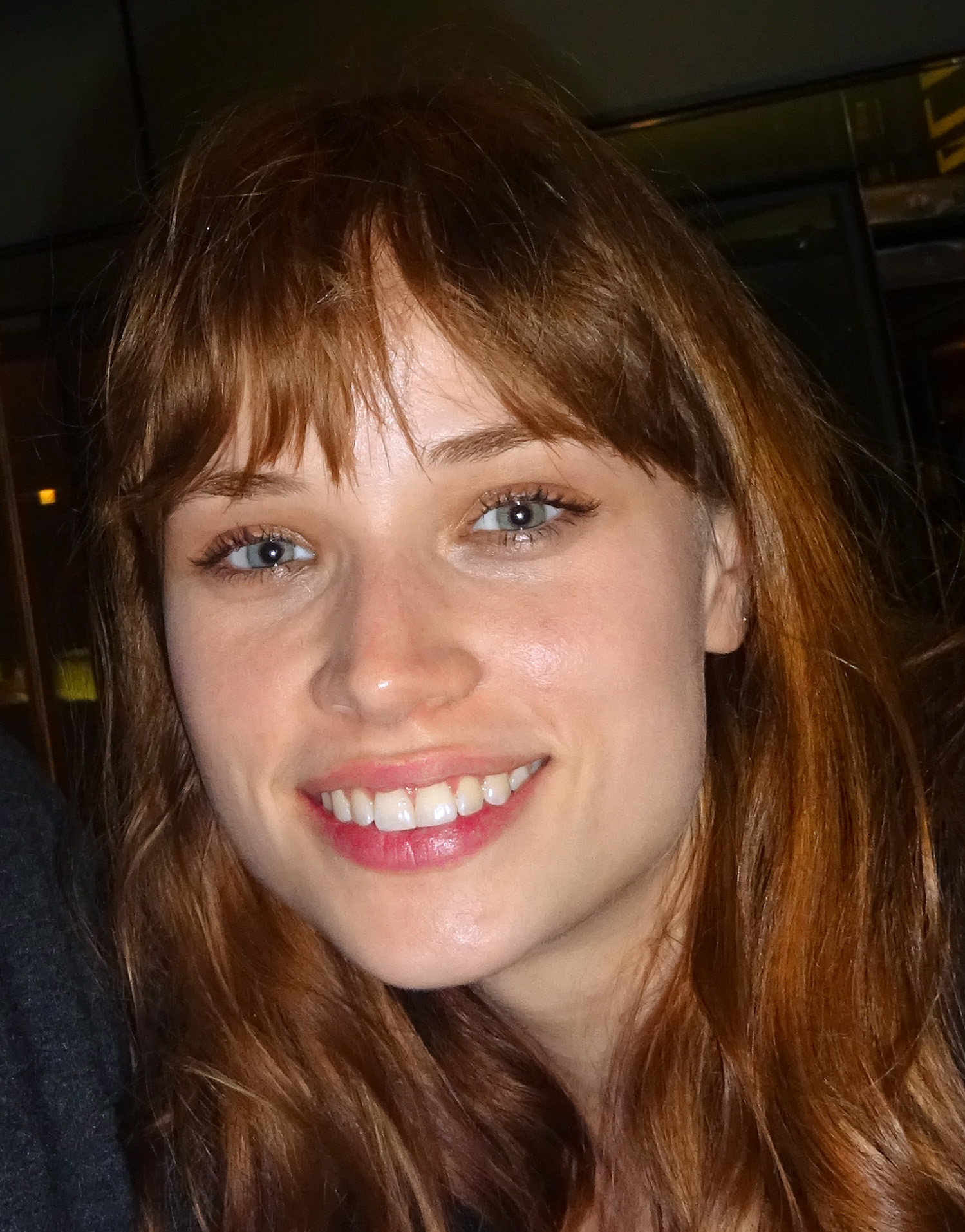
Makenzie Leigh

Liza (portrayed by Makenzie Leigh) is a singer who has applied for an opening at Fish Mooney's nightclub and subsequently became an agent for Mooney to seduce Don Carmine Falcone. She is subsequently blackmailed by Oswald Cobblepot. Upon Mooney faking Liza's kidnapping, Liza is later strangled to death by Falcone in front of Mooney and Gilzean after Oswald tells Falcone the whole story.

==== Alvarez ====
Alvarez (portrayed by J.W. Cortes) is a detective of the Gotham City Police Department. During the chaos caused by the Alice Tetch virus, Alvarez got infected and started shooting his fellow police officers until he was knocked out by Lucius Fox. He was later among those cured.

==== Kristen Kringle ====
Kristen Kringle (portrayed by Chelsea Spack) is an archivist at Gotham City Police Department to whom Edward Nygma is attracted to. After Edward finds out Kringle is being abused by her boyfriend Tom Doughtery, Edward accidentally stabs him multiple times outside of Kringle's apartment after he told him to leave Kringle alone. He then tries to cover up the death by leaving Kringle notes and riddles which leave her suspicious. Later when Edward saves her from the Maniax GCPD massacre, the two start dating. However, during one of their dates, she finds out that Edward murdered her ex-boyfriend Tom, and she threatens to call the police on Edward and he accidentally chokes her to death. Initially grief-stricken, the darker side of his personality soon emerges, and he chops up Kringle's body and buries her in the woods where he meets Oswald Cobblepot. Soon, however, Jim Gordon starts investigating Kringle's disappearance and tricks Edward into revealing the location of her body after Edward tries to kill Jim. After Edward is caught by the GCPD, he is placed in Arkham until he is eventually let out by Oswald to help him run for mayor.

==== Victor Zsasz ====
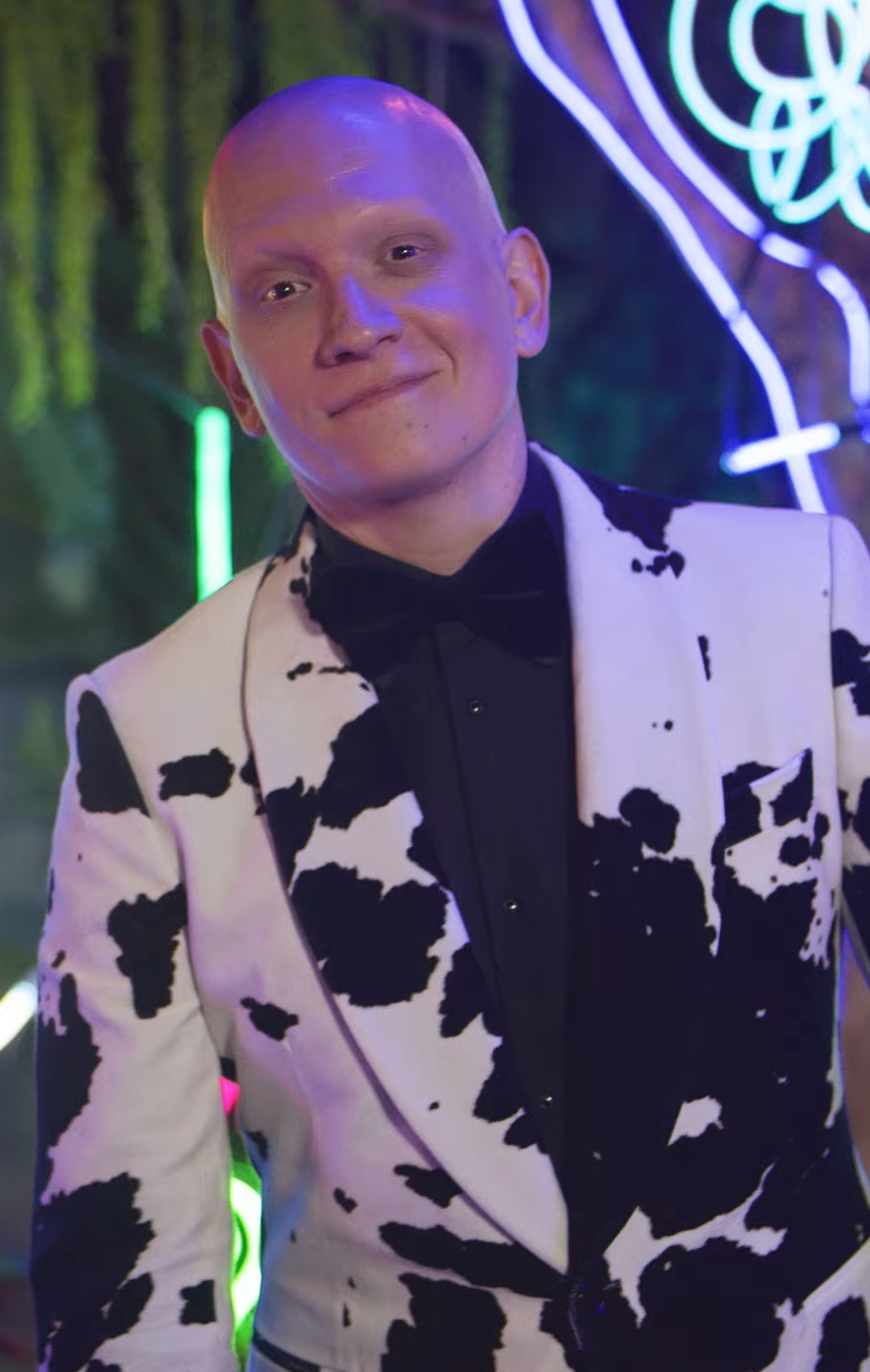
Anthony Carrigan

Victor Zsasz (portrayed by Anthony Carrigan) is a sadistic hitman who is loyal to Carmine Falcone and is assisted by a number of female associates. He carves a tally mark into his skin for every person he kills.

Following Carmine Falcone's retirement, Zsasz becomes loyal to Cobblepot.

Zsasz is later hired by Falcone to kill Gordon after the death of Falcone's son Mario and attempts to kill him twice before the job is cancelled by Falcone at the persuasion of Lee.

Three months following the chaos caused by the Alice Tetch virus, Victor Zsasz works with Cobblepot to make sure that the specific criminals in Gotham City have specific licenses to commit crimes and to dispose of anyone that gets in Cobblepot's way.

==== Gabriel ====
Gabriel (portrayed by Alex Corrado) is a thug who works as Oswald Cobblepot's bodyguard. He previously worked as a bodyguard for Frankie Carbone as a member of the Maroni crime family until he assisted Oswald and another operative into killing him during the attack on Nikolai's warehouse. After that, he began to follow Oswald's every command, he always seemed loyal to Oswald, but secretly, he followed him only out of fear.

After Oswald's life was saved by Ivy Pepper, Gabriel and those with him tried to have him planned for an auction where he will be killed off, only for Ivy to use her perfume on them which led to those who came with Gabriel to end up killed. Upon admitting the truth that he followed Oswald out of fear when under the control of Ivy's perfume, Oswald angrily stabbed Gabriel to death and buried him in Ivy's plants him alongside those who came with him.

==== Gillian B. Loeb ====
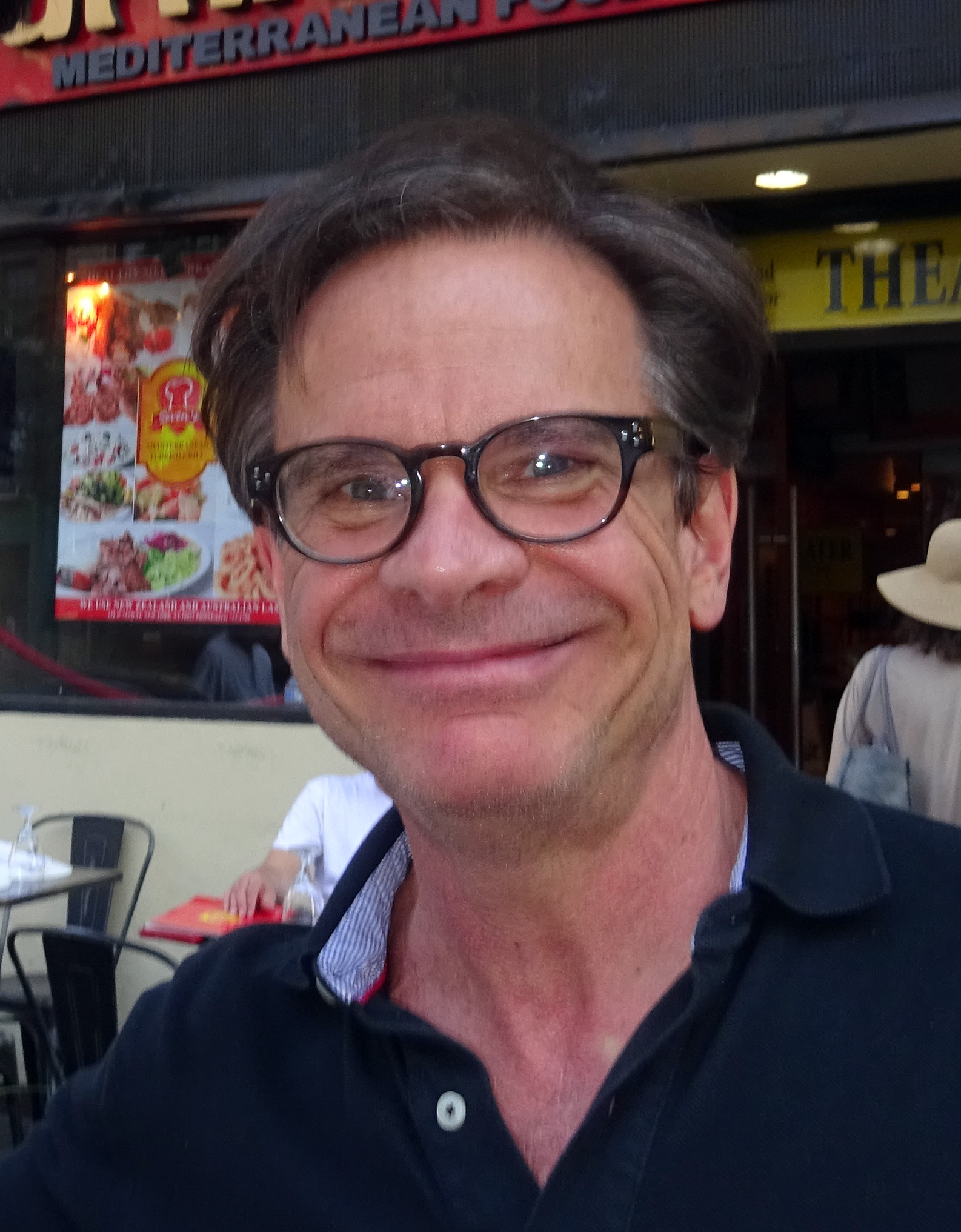
Peter Scolari

Gillian B. Loeb (portrayed by Peter Scolari) is the corrupt Commissioner of the Gotham City Police Department who is allied with Carmine Falcone until he switches to being an ally to Sal Maroni by the end of the season. He is initially Jim Gordon's enemy and even has him fired after he stopped Zaardon the Soul Reaper.

After Jim does a favor for Oswald Cobblepot, he and Victor Zsasz force Loeb at gunpoint to resign from the Gotham City Police Department. After Loeb resigns, Sarah Essen is sworn in as the new commissioner.

==== Jonathan Crane ====
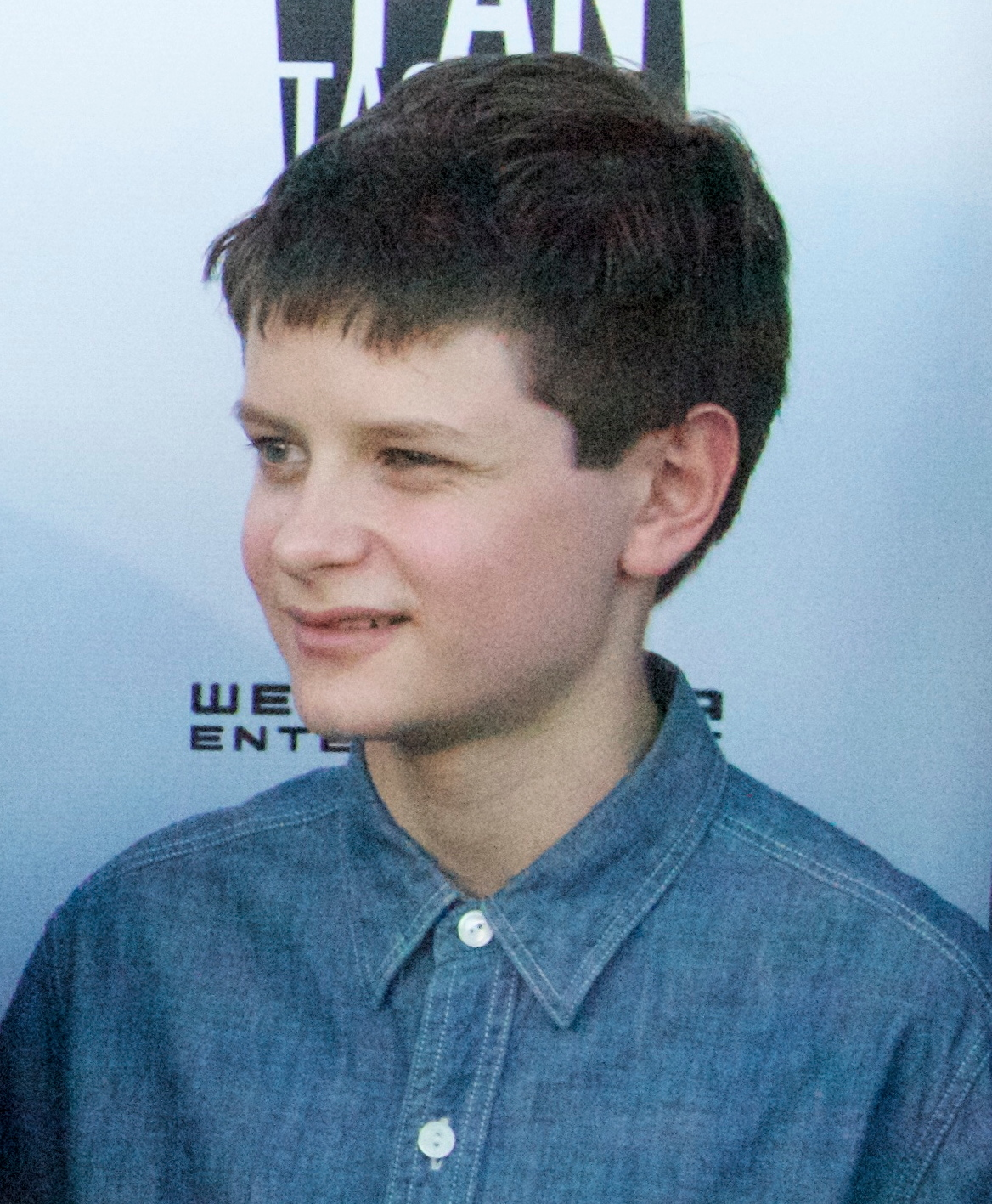
Charlie Tahan

Jonathan Crane / The Scarecrow (portrayed by Charlie Tahan), but was played by David W. Thompson during seasons 4–5.

He is introduced in the first-season episodes "The Fearsome Dr. Crane" and "The Scarecrow". His father Gerald Crane (portrayed by Julian Sands) creates the 'fear toxin', a serum designed to eliminate fear, and then injects Jonathan with it. Detectives Jim Gordon and Harvey Bullock save Jonathan's life, but are too late to save his father and his sanity; the toxin has left him in a state of perpetual terror, plagued by hallucinations of his greatest fear: scarecrows. He is next seen in the season four episode "Pax Penguina", in which he is institutionalized in Arkham Asylum, where the corrupt warden Reed uses his fears to keep him under control. A gang of criminals led by Grady Harris and Merton bribe Reed to give them Crane and forces him to re-create his father's fear toxin so they can use it to control Gotham City. Jonathan eventually embraces his fear and uses the toxin against Grady Harris after Merton and his fellow gang members were arrested. He then wreaks havoc on Gotham with the toxin as "The Scarecrow". In "The Fear Reaper", Crane invades Arkham Asylum and uses the fear gas on Warden Reed and other inmates causing the guards to flee. When Gordon confronts Scarecrow, he gets infected with fear gas until he overcomes it. After Gordon turns on the sprinklers and neutralizes the fear gas' effects on the inmates, Scarecrow got away. In "One of My Three Soups", Scarecrow is shown as an inmate at Arkham Asylum after getting apprehended at some point. He is freed by the Mad Hatter where they, along with Jerome Valeska, collaborate in a plot that involves releasing all the inmates of Arkham Asylum. After the Hatter is defeated by Jim Gordon, Scarecrow gasses the driver of his transport as he and Jerome free him for their next plot. In "Mandatory Brunch Meeting", the Scarecrow is one of the criminals assembled by Jerome to be part of his "Legion of Horribles". He and the Mad Hatter break out Jerome from his twin brother Jeremiah's custody but are chased off by Gordon and Bullock. At the end of the episode, it is revealed that Jerome secretly tasked Scarecrow to concocts a laughing gas for him to spread across the city. In "That's Entertainment," Scarecrow, along with Mr. Freeze, carries out a raid on Wayne Enterprises' chemical lab to brew more of the dangerous toxin. Later, Scarecrow, Mad Hatter and the Penguin go to a hangar to load the laughing gas onto a blimp and release it upon Gotham. There, he reveals to Penguin that the other Legion members anticipated his betrayal and that he knew Penguin would go to Jim Gordon, and then proceeding to knock him out. In the episode "One Bad Day", Scarecrow assists Jeremiah Valeska in his plot to drive Bruce Wayne insane; using his fear toxin, Scarecrow makes Bruce hallucinate an insane Alfred attacking him, but Selina sneaks in and fights the Scarecrow, who is outmatched by her and then escapes as she frees Alfred and Bruce. In season 5, with Gotham now a "no man's land", Scarecrow leads his own gang as they take over a laboratory for Scarecrow's experiments, with Scarecrow killing the scientist who owns the lab. In the episode "Year Zero", Scarecrow then leads his gang on an attack against the GCPD's territory to steal their supplies, where he faces Gordon, who manages to drive him off. In the episode "Pena Dura", Gordon mentions Scarecrow to Eduardo Dorrance about the various criminals and their territories. In the episode "The Trial of Jim Gordon", Scarecrow made a cameo during Gordon's hallucination of his trial as a member of his jury and then attends his funeral.

==== Jerome Valeska ====
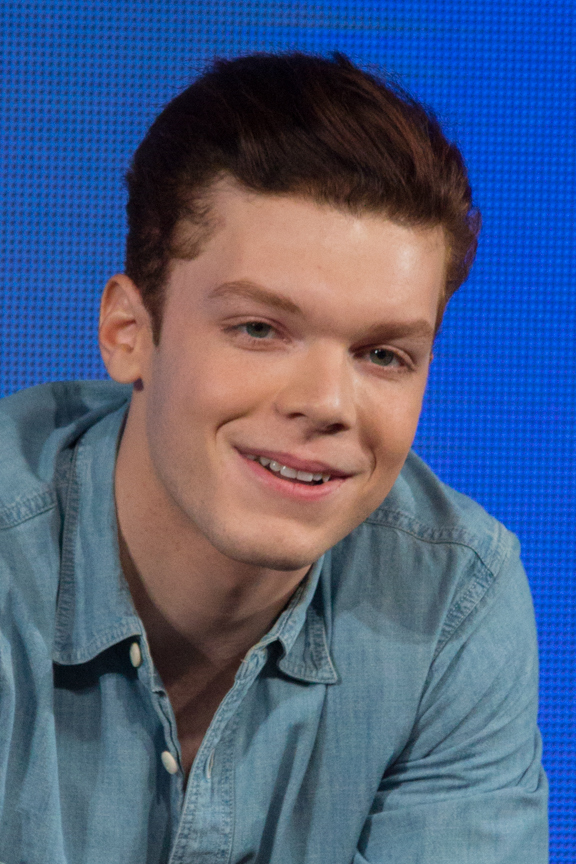
Cameron Monaghan

Jerome Valeska (portrayed by Cameron Monaghan) is the psychopathic son of circus snake dancer Lila Valeska and blind fortune teller Paul Cicero, and the twin brother of Jeremiah Valeska. After confessing to the murder of his mother and telling of her abusive nature, Jerome seemingly breaks down before beginning to laugh maniacally.

He is among the maniacal inmates who are later freed from Arkham Asylum by Theo and Tabitha Galavan, as part of their plot to create chaos in Gotham City. Jerome proceeds to kill his father, who foretells of Jerome's legacy of death and madness. Jerome then takes hostages at the Gotham Children's Hospital Gala and murders Deputy Mayor Harrison Kane. As Jerome prepares to execute Bruce Wayne, Theo kills Jerome to make himself look like a hero. Following Jerome's death, random civilians in Gotham who watched the televised hostage crisis suffer mental breakdowns and begin to imitate Jerome's murderous actions, thus affirming Cicero's vision.

Former Indian Hill scientist Dwight Pollard, who has become the leader of a fanatic cult worshipping Jerome, later conducts several experiments in an attempt to resurrect him. When Pollard's project appears to fail, he cuts off Jerome's face and wears it as a mask to command respect. Despite this, Jerome comes back to life hours later and kidnaps Pollard before stapling his face back onto his head. Jerome then sets off a series of explosives at a power plant, killing Pollard and causing a citywide blackout in Gotham. After abducting Bruce Wayne from Wayne Manor, Jerome takes him to a carnival occupied by his followers. Bruce manages to defeat Jerome and the latter is once more incarcerated at Arkham Asylum, where his face is surgically reattached. Nearly a year later, Jerome escapes along with Jervis Tetch and Jonathan Crane. He hatches a plot to plunge Gotham into anarchy with an insanity-inducing gas and exact revenge upon Bruce Wayne and Jeremiah. Before falling to his death during a confrontation with Police Captain Jim Gordon, Jerome arranges for a post-mortem "gift" to be sent to Jeremiah in the form of a jack-in-the-box; this package sprayed Jeremiah with a special version of the insanity gas, causing Jeremiah to continue his brother's legacy.

==== Tommy Bones ====
Tommy Bones (portrayed by James Andrew O'Connor) is a made man and hitman for the Maroni crime family who just got out of prison. During the gang war between the Falcone Crime Family and the Maroni Crime Family, Tommy was injured in a gunfight with Gordon.

He is later seen to be a member of Oswald Cobblepot's crime syndicate. As part of Edward Nygma's plot to break Mayor Oswald Cobblepot's mind, Tabitha holds Tommy at gunpoint in order to issue a threat to Mayor Cobblepot. Afterwards, Tommy is killed by Tabitha.

=== Introduced in season 2 ===
==== Silver St. Cloud ====
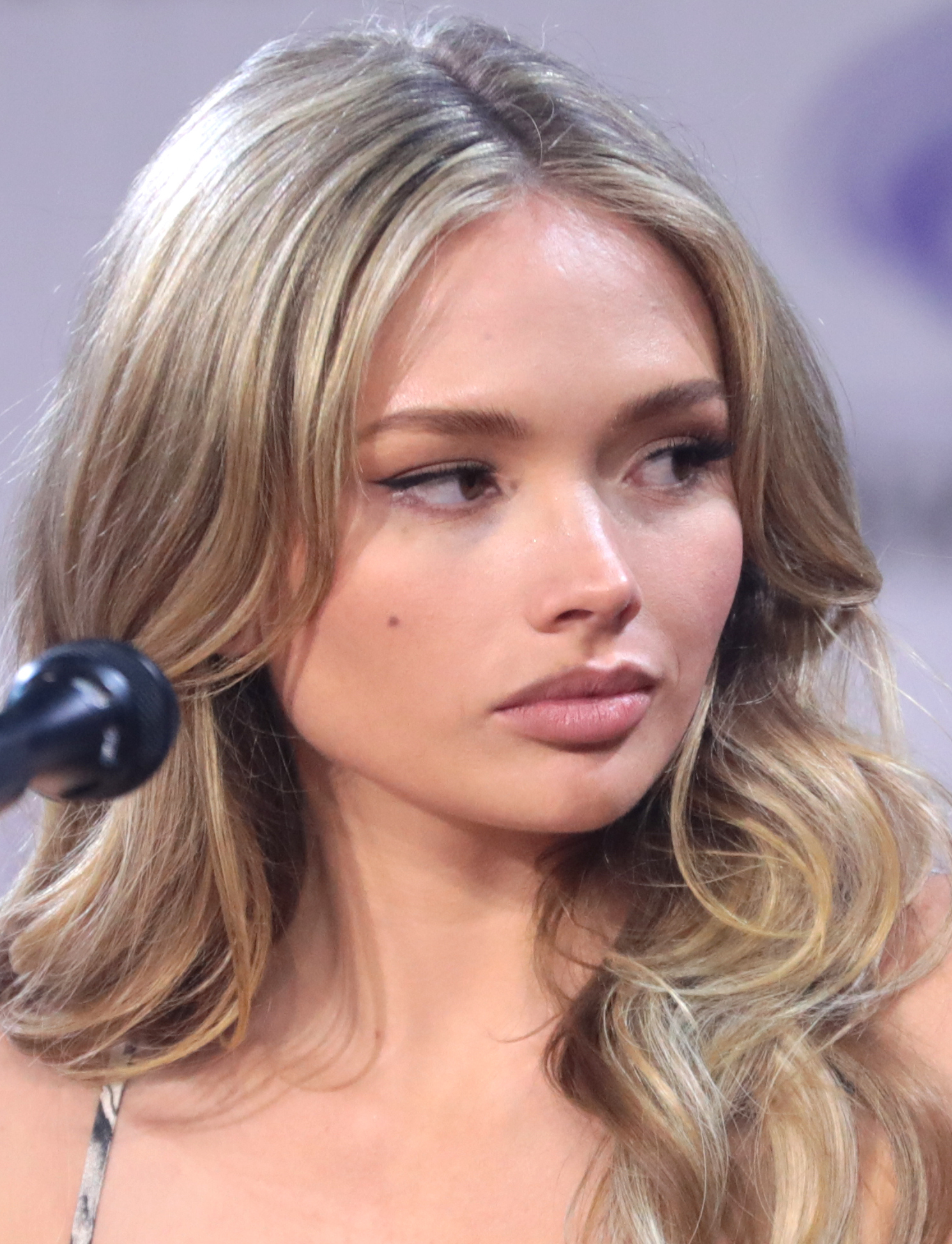
Natalie Alyn Lind

Silver St. Cloud (portrayed by Natalie Alyn Lind) is the mannerly niece of Theo Galavan and Tabitha Galavan who serves as a love interest to Bruce Wayne, despite having dark intentions. She was orphaned at a young age and her father was Theo's stepbrother. Theo then forced her to show fake affection for Bruce. After Theo abducts Bruce Wayne, he has Silver work to get Bruce to admit his love to her before the Order of St. Dumas can begin their ritual. During the fight against the Order of St. Dumas, Silver flees with Tabitha.

==== Bridgit Pike / Firefly ====
Bridgit Pike / Firefly (portrayed by Michelle Veintimilla in season 2 and 4, Camila Perez in seasons 3–4) is the quasi "stepsister" of Joe, Cale, and Evan Pike. She was a childhood friend of Selina Kyle and had once met Ivy Pepper. Bridgit was forced by her stepbrothers to join the family business and was abused by them. After much abuse, Bridgit eventually snapped, burning Joe and Cale to death, and beginning a vigilante spree. In a confrontation with the GCPD, her entire body was severely scarred from the burns sustained from her tank leaking from a bullet shot caused by one of the police officers. She was then taken to the underground Indian Hill facility as the scientists believe she is immune to fire as it was mentioned in a discussion between two orderlies that protective clothing was "fused" to her. Selina Kyle later encountered Pike at the Indian Hill facility where she has no memory of Selina, calls herself Firefly, and is sporting a new outfit. Strange brainwashed Bridget into thinking she was a fire goddess. She then accepted Selina as her servant, after being convinced all "deities" need one. During the Indian Hill conflict, she got into a fight with Victor Fries and Strange accidentally got caught in their crossfire.

Oswald Cobblepot and Ivy Pepper later find her working at a factory. After learning about Ivy Pepper's encounter with Marv and some persuasion, Bridgit Pike agrees to help Oswald and Ivy where she starts by throwing hot coal into her abusive boss' face. Though she is still at odds with Victor Fries, Bridgit Pike was with Penguin when they interfered in the Court of Owls' plans to use the weaponized version of Alice Tetch's blood on a Daughters of Gotham event where Bridgit Pike burned the Talon present. Later that night, she was knocked out by a Talon that was sent to abduct Penguin. Bridgit Pike later assisted Fish Mooney into obtaining the earlier antidotes for the Alice Tetch virus and fighting the ninjas from the League of Shadows during the chaos caused by the Alice Tetch virus. After Fish Mooney was accidentally killed by James Gordon, she and Victor Fries disappeared before the police arrived.

Firefly was later sent by Oswald Cobblepot to do away with Edward Nygma in the event that Barbara Kean, Tabitha Galavan, and Selina Kyle failed to bring Nygma to him. She crashed the fight between Solomon Grundy and Tabitha at Cherry's fight club where her fire attacks struck fear into Grundy. Lee Thompkins disabled Firefly by shooting her flamethrower tank which sent her flying into a wall. Veintimilla returned to the role with the season 4 episode "Mandatory Brunch Meeting".

When Gotham City became a no man's land, Firefly started her own gang in order to develop her territory. It was mentioned by Gordon that Firefly is in a turf war with Mr. Freeze.

==== Father Creel ====
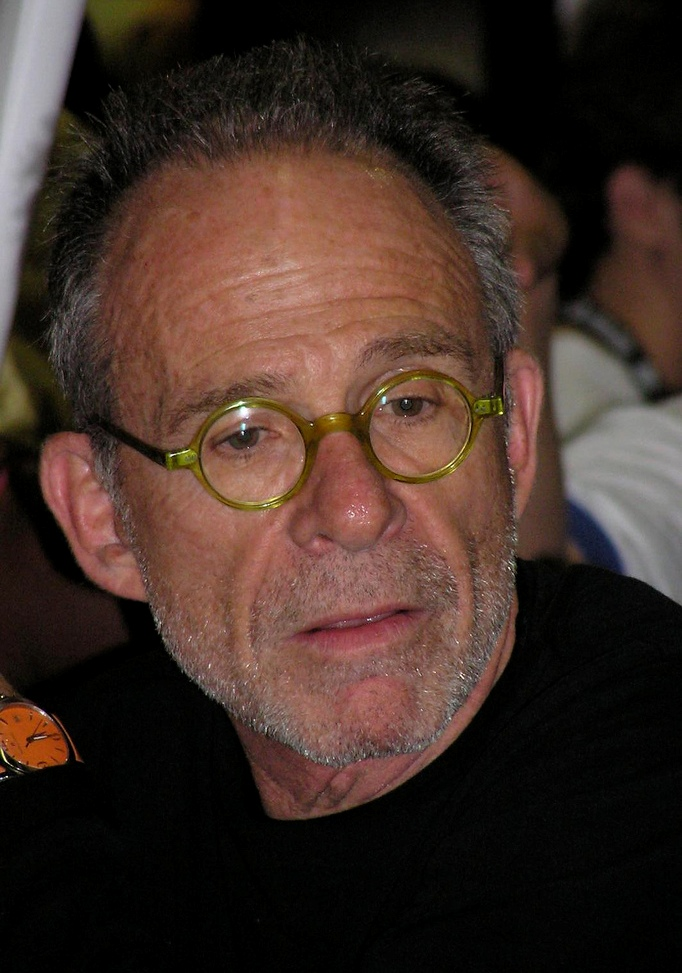
Ron Rifkin

Father Creel (portrayed by Ron Rifkin) is a priest who is a high-ranking member of the religious sect of the Dumas family that left Gotham City with connections with Theo Galavan. Galavan met up with Father Creel and gives him the knife that was used by Jonathan Wayne to cut off Caleb Dumas' right hand. Creel tells Galavan that the rest of the religious sect is en route to Gotham City. Father Creel later welcomes his brothers when they arrive in Gotham City. During the fight between Oswald Cobblepot's group and the Order of St. Dumas to free Bruce Wayne, Father Creel is killed by Harvey Bullock.

==== Hugo Strange ====
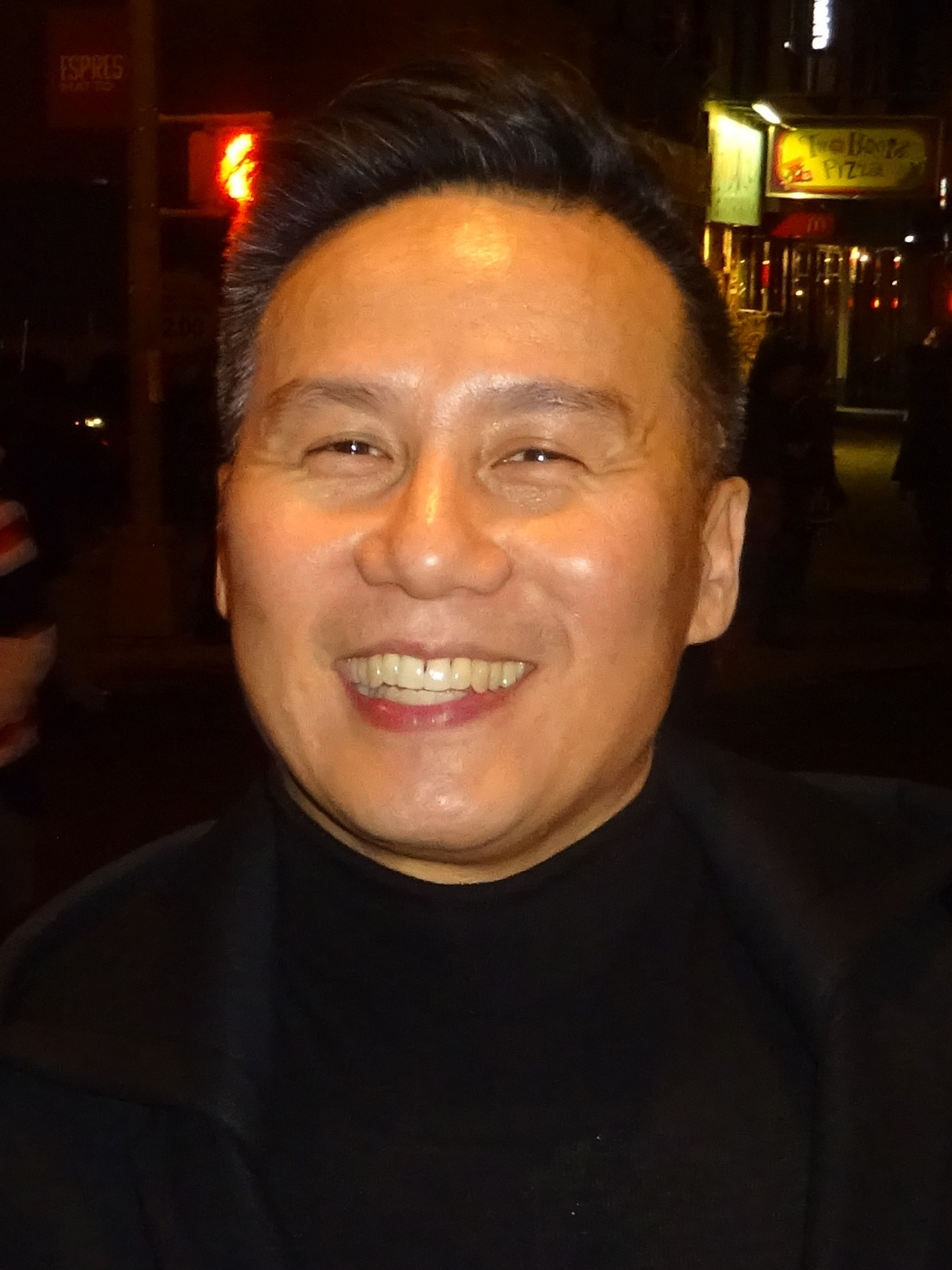
BD Wong

Hugo Strange (portrayed by BD Wong) is obsessed with understanding and manipulating the human mind, he is a professor and Chief of Psychiatry at Arkham Asylum who is connected to the asylum's creation and uses it for his personal experiments on patients, which often results in the worsening of their mental conditions. He is the main antagonist of the second half of season 2 Wrath of the Villains, for his involvement with the secret underground Indian Hill facility owned by Wayne Enterprises that performs inhumane medical experiments on super-powered beings, later revealed to have been an overseer of the abandoned Pinewood program that Thomas Wayne started years ago. After Thomas disapproved of the project, Strange contracted Patrick Malone to kill the Waynes to keep his continued project a secret. While his scientists use experimental reprogramming on Oswald Cobblepot, Strange manages to win Victor Fries's assistance in his experiments of reviving corpses of recently killed criminals. After having Victor kill a former Pinewood patient named Karen Jennings in an attempt to conceal his involvement, Strange manages to fully resurrect Theo Galavan and reinvents him into Azrael to have him kill Gordon. Later, Strange shredded all his documents to avoid suspicion from the GCPD. Strange then managed to resurrect Fish Mooney, also giving her the ability to get people to do her bidding just by making contact. In the final battle at the Indian Hill facility, Strange was caught in the crossfire between Victor Fries and Bridgit Pike only to be resuscitated by Gordon. After the bomb was deactivated, Strange was arrested by the police.

Six months later, Fish freed Strange from his cell to help find a cure for her disease. When Strange said he could not do it, Penguin allowed the two of them to flee Gotham, telling them to never come back. Kathryn later brought Strange back to Gotham City so that he can extract Alice Tetch's poisonous blood from Nathaniel Barnes into weaponizing it. Gordon and Bullock later found the secret lab where he was working. After tranquilizing the test subject, Strange gave them the research on the weaponized blood and a sample that he secretly kept from the Court of Owls in exchange that they do not arrest him and cause the Court of Owls to go ahead with their plans. After telling Alfred about the Court of Owls plans, Strange tried to leave Gotham City only to be intercepted by Fish Mooney's men in order to find the earlier antidotes for the Alice Tetch virus which he kept at a slaughterhouse as he also still promised Fish Mooney an army of monsters. After Fish Mooney was accidentally killed by James Gordon, Strange was arrested again by the police and agrees to help develop an antidote. Penguin later enlisted Strange to cure Butch Gilzean which he managed to do. Later on, Strange is instructed to work on a wounded Lee Thompkins and Riddler.

Theresa Walker and Delta Force later used Strange in planting mind-control chips in Leslie and Riddler as he is still experimenting on dead bodies. Gordon finds Riddler and Strange in his hideout until Delta Force arrives and takes Strange away. Upon finding Eduardo wounded, Theresa plans to have Strange fix him up.

==== Ethel Peabody ====
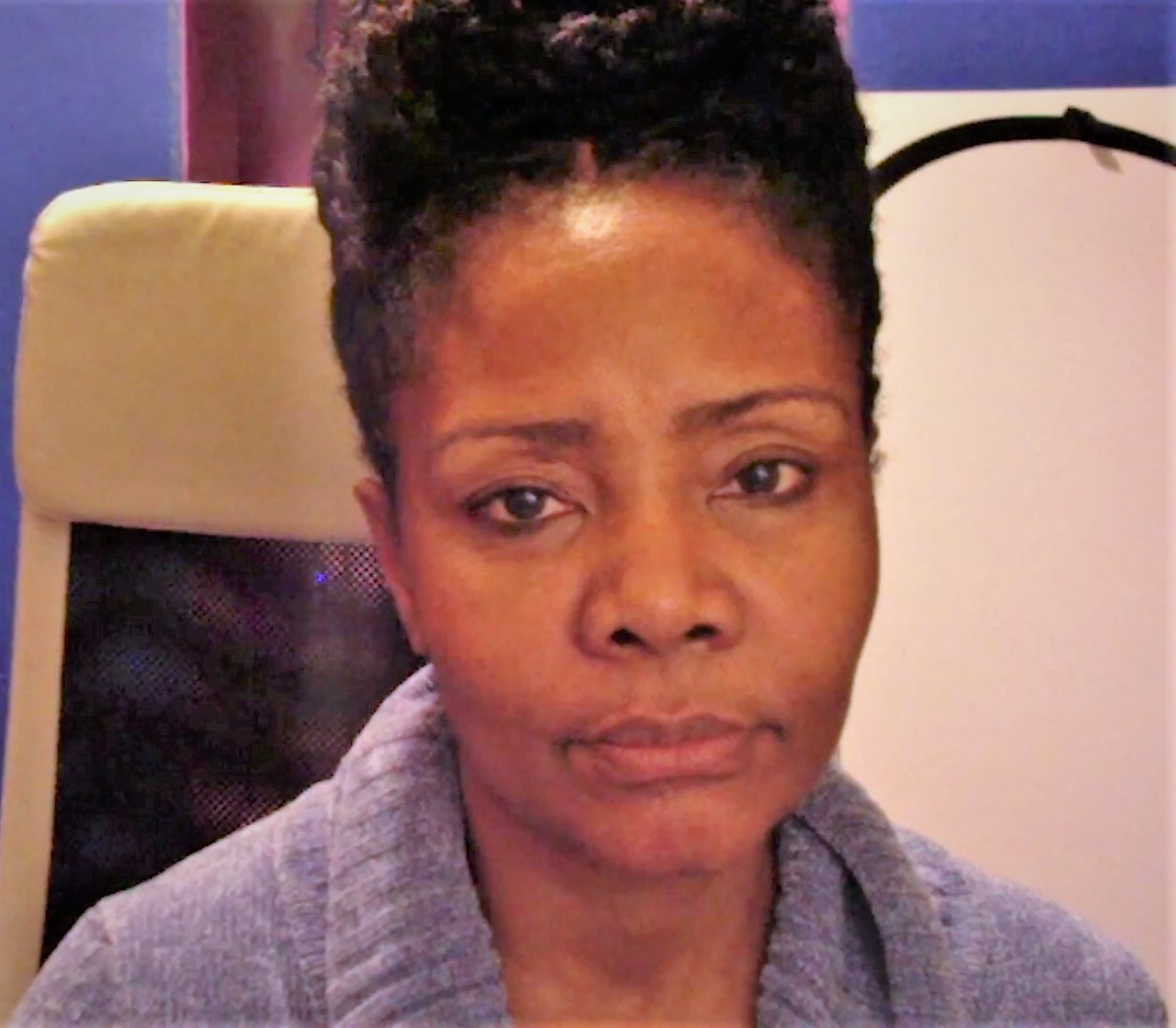
Tonya Pinkins

Ethel Peabody (portrayed by Tonya Pinkins) is a scientist and assistant of Hugo Strange who works at the Indian Hill facility and Arkham Asylum.

After Strange was arrested, Fish approached her for a cure, but she did not have any way of making one. She is then killed by Strange's experiment Marv after he turns her old and near death.

==== Victor Fries / Mr. Freeze ====
Victor Fries / Mr. Freeze (portrayed by Nathan Darrow) is one of Gotham's preeminent cryogenics engineers. Bruno Heller has stated that Victor will be a tragic character. He started abducting people for his experiments to find the right coolant combination that would enable him to freeze his wife Nora until he found a cure for her illness. After Nora was brought in by the police, Fries turns himself over to the police. One of the frozen people successfully revived as it proved that A16 worked as Fries works to save Nora. Upon the police converging on his house, Fries turned the chemicals on himself after it was discovered that Nora switched the cryogenic chemicals. Although Hugo Strange claimed that Fries died in the infirmary, he was actually placed in the Indian Hill facility within a special refrigerated cell at −20 degrees as the result of his attempted suicide. Hugo also states that he modified Fries' suit to keep him alive in temperatures above subzero temperatures so that Fries can help Hugo with his project with dead bodies. Fries was later sent by Strange to kill former Pinewood patient Karen Jennings. After being questioned by Gordon, Strange claimed that Fries was cremated. During the Indian Hill conflict, Fries ends up in a fight against Firefly which ended when Strange got caught in the crossfire of their elemental attacks.

Oswald Cobblepot and Ivy Pepper later find Fries in a frigid location. As a way to persuade Fries to help, Oswald and Ivy returned his special suit that was held in Wayne Enterprises. Though he is still at odds with Bridgit Pike. Fries later assisted Fish Mooney into obtaining the earlier antidotes for the Alice Tetch virus and fighting the ninjas from the League of Shadows during the chaos caused by the virus. After Fish Mooney was accidentally killed by James Gordon, he and Bridgit disappeared from the scene before police arrived. After the chaos caused by the virus had ended, Oswald Cobblepot had Fries use his freeze gun on Riddler. Oswald Cobblepot later called in Fries to refreeze Edward Nygma when he was freed from the ice.

As Edward Nygma was not acting like his usual way, Cobblepot had to spare Nygma from being frozen by Fries again.

When Gotham City became a no man's land, Mr. Freeze started claiming his territory. It was mentioned by Gordon that Mr. Freeze is in a turf war with Firefly.

==== Subject 514A ====
"Subject 514A" (portrayed by David Mazouz) is an unnamed look-a-like clone of Bruce with longer hair and a mark over his right eyebrow who was among the experiments who escaped from the Indian Hill bus. He later had an encounter with Ivy Pepper who ran from him while he asked who Bruce Wayne is. After meeting Bruce Wayne and Alfred Pennyworth, Subject 514A started to mimic Bruce's voice and started to resemble him. He took Selina out for dinner and helped her escape after she failed to rob a bank. Selina eventually realized that 514A was not Bruce, and after 514A explained the situation, revealing that all he ever wanted was a friend. Selina told him that he is more normal then he thinks, and while saying goodbye, 514A kisses Selina. 514A is later approached by Kathryn of the Court of Owls who states that she is one of her "parents". He is then loaded into Kathryn's car by Talon. Following Jerome's defeat, 514A has had his scars "erased" by the Court of Owls as they make their plans to "save" Gotham City. After having Bruce Wayne sent to the Shaman and posing as him, 514A reports to Kathryn that the nosebleeds he has been having has been happening more as Kathryn predicts that 514A will be dead by the time Bruce Wayne returns. When he is unable to persuade Selina Kyle into leaving town and she threatened to inform Alfred, Subject 514A pushed her out the window. Selina later recovered and attacked 514A with Alfred joining the fight causing 514A to defeat them and leave Wayne Manor. After speaking to Kathryn Monroe, Subject 514A later dies offscreen after succumbing to his injuries.

=== Introduced in season 3 ===
==== Valerie Vale ====
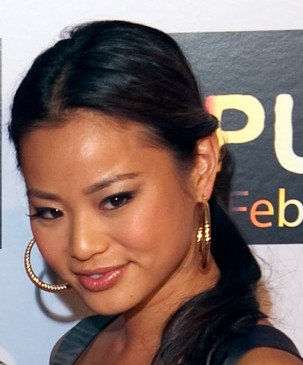
Jamie Chung

Valerie Vale (portrayed by Jamie Chung) is a journalist for the Gotham Gazette and the aunt of Vicki Vale. She briefly serves as Jim Gordon's love interest, but after she got kidnapped and shot by Jervis Tetch, she realized Gordon was still in love with Lee and broke up with him.

==== Mario Calvi ====
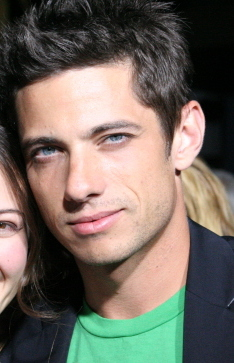
James Carpinello

Mario Calvi (portrayed by James Carpinello) is the son of Carmine Falcone who is an expert doctor and the fiancée of Leslie Thompkins. While he was not born with the Falcone name and served as a disappointment to the family business, he did bring honor to the Falcone family. He is later revealed to have Alice Tetch's blood in him which enhances his jealousy. When he tries to stab Leslie at Carmine Falcone's lakehouse, Gordon shoots him dead in self-defense to save Leslie.

==== Court of Owls ====
The Court of Owls is a secret society that existed in Gotham for centuries, formed by members of Gotham's wealthiest families, and the main antagonists of season 3. They are with connections to Indian Hill with plans to "save" Gotham City from its corruption. They have been known to tell specific people like Carmine Falcone and Aubrey James what to do. Before they planning to release Tetch-Virus and wipe out Gotham's crimes once again, all members of the court has been executed by Talons on Shaman's order, as punishment for murdering Thomas and Martha Wayne without his approval, leaving the court officially defunct.

===== Kathryn Monroe =====
Kathryn Monroe (portrayed by Kit Flanagan in season 2, Leslie Hendrix in season 3) is a white-haired spokeswoman of the Court of Owls, a high-ranking member that Hugo Strange and Ethel Peabody answer to. When she has Talon bring Bruce to her, Bruce recognizes her as someone he's seen at the Wayne Enterprises parties. Due to a deal Bruce reluctantly had to agreed to where he would not do any more investigating. Kathryn has the Court operative return Bruce to Wayne Manor while stating that he will not see her again. Kathryn and Talon later encountered Subject 514A stating that she is one of his "parents" and has him loaded into her car. After being apprehended by the Gotham City Police Department, Kathryn tries to get Nathaniel Barnes to stop his rampage there and retreat only for her to be beheaded by Barnes.

===== Frank Gordon =====
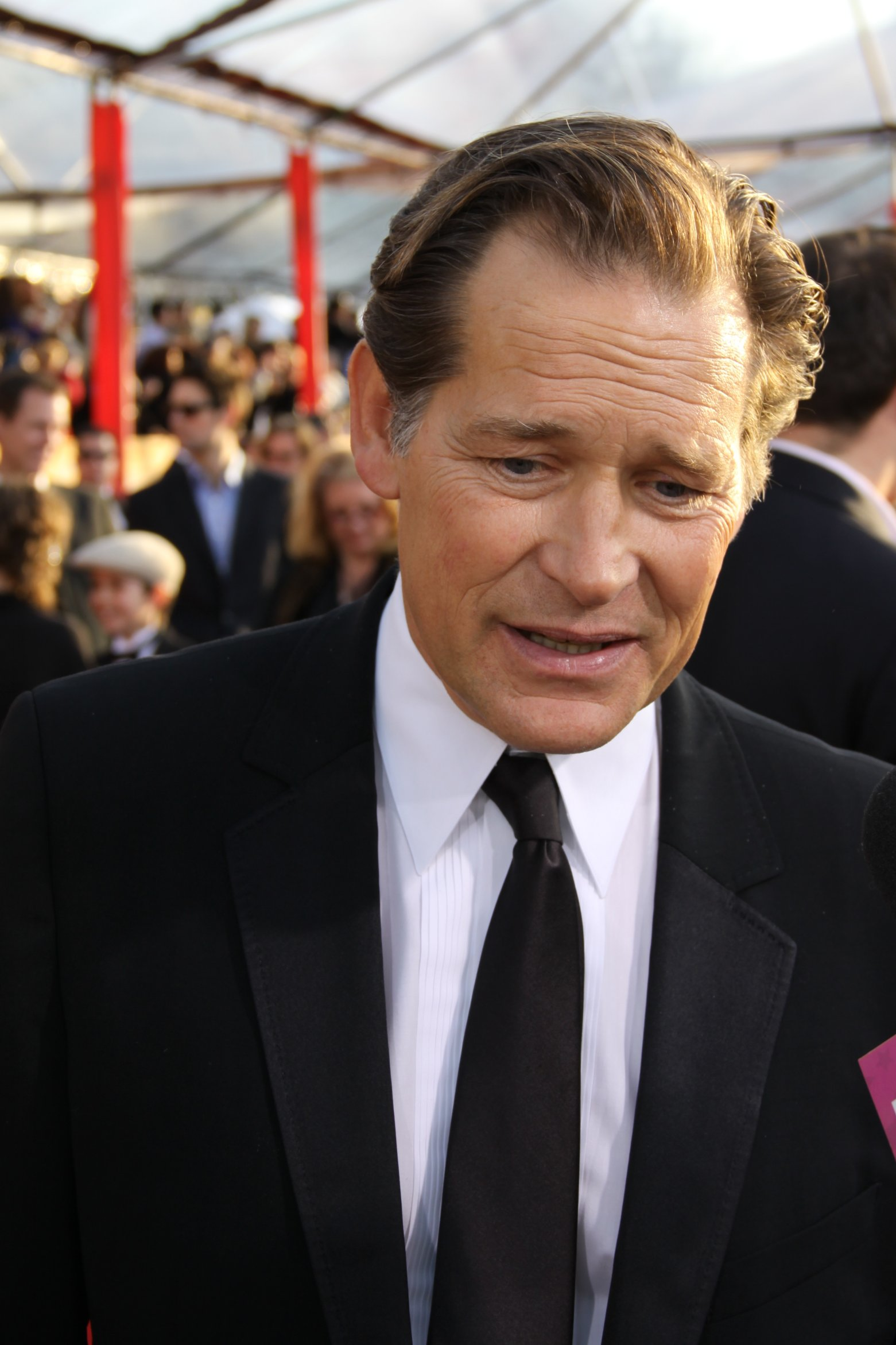
James Remar

Frank Gordon (portrayed by James Remar) is the estranged uncle of Jim Gordon and brother of Peter Gordon who returns to the city after Peter died 25 years ago. He is a member of the Court of Owls where he possesses the same ring as Peter did. After Jim managed to stop the chaos caused by Jerome Valeska's resurrection, Frank appears at Jim's apartment for the first time in years. After Jim learns about his uncle's involvement with his father's death and that the Court of Owls has a weapon from Indian Hill held at Dock 9C that they planned to use on Gotham City, Frank tells Jim to play along with Kathryn and then commits suicide by shooting himself in the head.

===== The Talons =====
The Talons (Various Actors) are a group of masked deadly assassins that are loyal to the Court of Owls. They are all well-trained, following every command, and willing to sacrifice their life to protect the court.

==== Sensei / Shaman ====
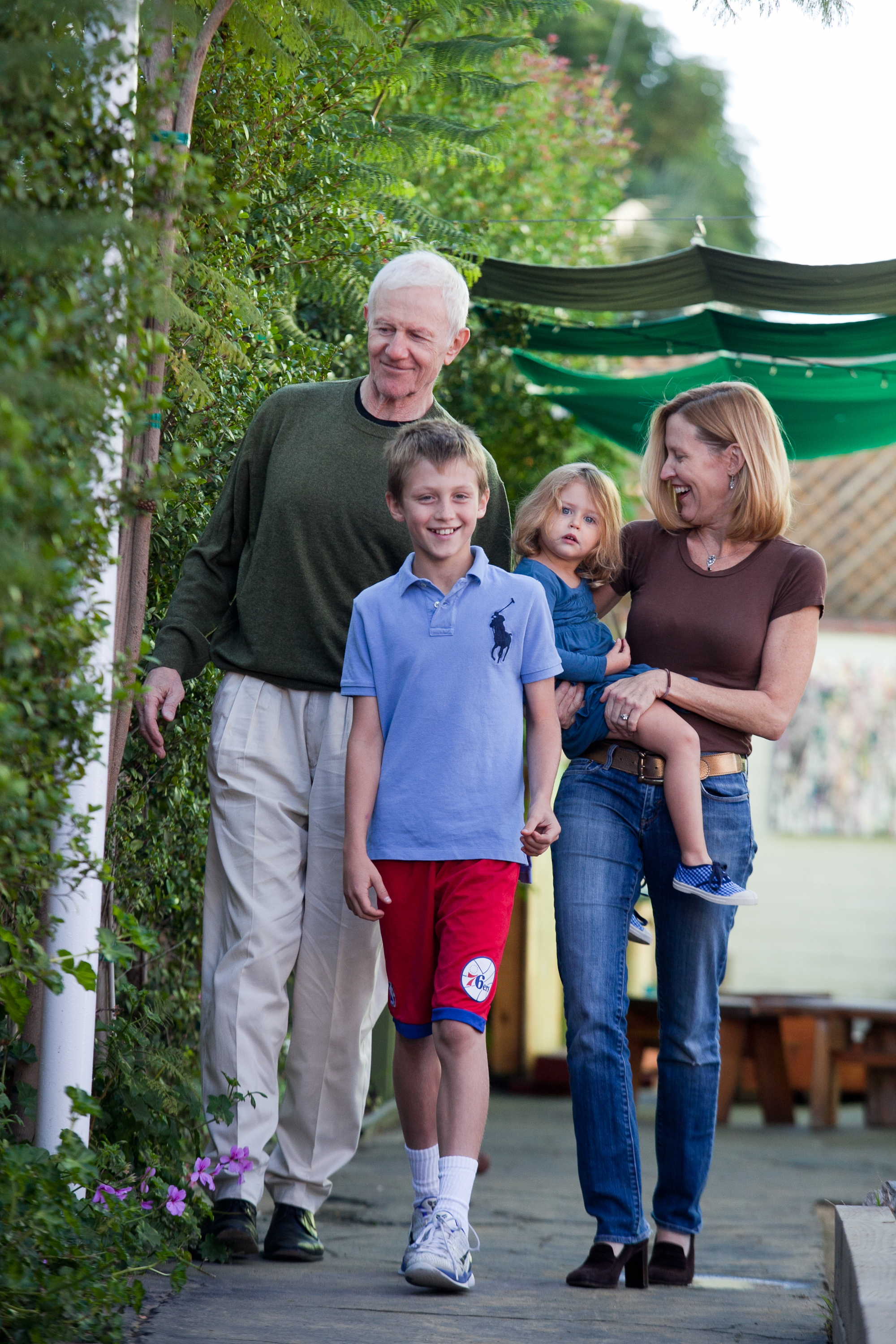
Raymond J. Barry

The Sensei / Shaman (portrayed by Raymond J. Barry) is a mysterious figure, associate of the Court of Owls, and servant of Ra's al Ghul who enters Bruce Wayne's life with the stated intention of unlocking the potential of his own mind. Bruce Wayne first meets him in a mountainous temple after being placed there by the Court of Owls. Shaman works to help Bruce get out of the alley in his mind and shape him to be a "protector of Gotham City". In a call with Kathryn, it is stated by Shaman that he is leading Gotham into his claim to shape his destiny. In a flashback, it was revealed that Shaman respected Thomas and Martha Wayne enough to have an unnamed Court of Owls member killed for carrying out the murder. It was also revealed that he was behind the part of the Talons' mental training. Upon forcing Bruce Wayne's hand to push the detonator to the bomb containing the weaponized version of Alice Tetch's poisonous blood, Shaman is shot by Alfred Pennyworth. Before dying of his wounds, Shaman tells Bruce to go to the Yuyan Building and "seek out the Demon's Head" as his last request.

=== Introduced in season 4 ===
==== Arthur Penn / Ventriloquist ====
Arthur Penn / Ventriloquist (portrayed by Andrew Sellon) is an accountant that works for Penguin. He originally worked for Carmine Falcone before working for Cobblepot and then Sofia Falcone.

When Gotham City was declared "no man's land," Arthur Penn stuck by Penguin's side. He is later shot by the Street Demonz leader. In his dying words, he told Cobblepot that his workers at the time hated him.

Somehow, Arthur Penn came back from the dead and found his way to a magic shop where he met the dummy of Scarface. When they made their way to Riddler's refuge where Penguin was, Scarface wanted Penguin to give him his treasure and grant him a way off the island. Thanks to a sonar attack by Riddler, Penguin struggled with Arthur which resulted in Scarface's head getting shot. When Arthur thanked Penguin for freeing him, he is shot in the head by Riddler.

==== Vanessa Harper ====
Vanessa Harper (portrayed by Kelcy Griffin) is a detective that transferred to Jim Gordon and Harvey Bullock's precinct from the 3–5.

==== Cherry ====
Cherry (portrayed by Marina Benedict) is the owner of a fight club in The Narrows. Riddler approaches her to let Solomon Grundy take part in the fight club. First, Cherry has her latest doctor Lee Thompkins tend to Grundy's burn. After Lee disabled Firefly, Cherry revealed that she tipped off Oswald Cobblepot and is shot in the head by Barbara Kean.

==== Lazlo Valentin / Professor Pyg ====
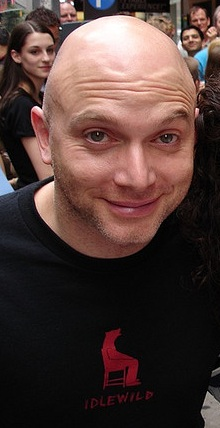
Michael Cerveris

Lazlo Valentin / Professor Pyg (portrayed by Michael Cerveris) is a pig-masked killer who targets dirty cops and other "greedy pigs" of Gotham City. After killing some corrupt police officers, Professor Pyg moved on to Phase 2 of his plan that involved harvesting the organs of dead less fortunate people that he poisoned and cooking them into the meat pies he made for a charity event at the Falcone Home and School for Orphans. During his fight with Jim Gordon, Professor Pyg was defeated by Gordon and was arrested by the police. While incarcerated at Arkham Asylum, Gordon gets a clue about his true identity and his surgeries where he was previously arrested down south in his unaltered state. After tricking a guard into coming into his cell, Professor Pyg kills the guard, leaves a message in blood for Gordon, and escapes.

When it was discovered that Professor Pyg was brought to Gotham City by Sofia Falcone, he planned to incarcerate him in Blackgate only for Sofia to shoot Professor Pyg to cover tracks.

==== Martin ====
Martin (portrayed by Christopher Convery) is a mute boy at the Falcone Home and School for Orphans who "speaks" by writing things on the blank pad hanging around his neck. Oswald Cobblepot takes a liking to the boy as he gives him some life advice. After faking his death following his capture at the hands of Sofia Falcone and Barbara Kean, Cobblepot says goodbye to Martin as Victor Zsasz takes Martin to somewhere safe and far from Gotham City. He was later rescued from Sofia's clutches by Riddler.

==== Jeremiah Valeska ====
Jeremiah Valeska (portrayed by Cameron Monaghan) is the brilliant and calculating son of circus snake dancer Lila Valeska and blind fortune teller Paul Cicero, and the twin brother of Jerome Valeska. Like Jerome, he is heavily tied to the origins of the Joker, and is possibly the show's version of him (although this is mainly left up to interpretation).

After allegedly suffering severe abuse at the hands of Jerome as a child, Jeremiah was sent to a shelter where he was adopted by a wealthy couple and renamed "Xander Wilde"; Jerome conversely claimed that Jeremiah was a sociopath who feigned being a victim to orchestrate these events. Jeremiah becomes a successful engineer for Wayne Enterprises as an adult and develops a friendship with Bruce Wayne, who agrees to fund his prototype high-energy generators to improve Gotham City. Jerome eventually captures Jeremiah and promises to "drive him mad". Following Jerome's death, Jeremiah is exposed to the Scarecrow's insanity-inducing gas at Jerome's final request, turning his skin white, dyeing his hair dark green, and staining his lips red. After gaining the loyalty of Jerome's followers at his late brother's grave, Jeremiah reveals himself to Bruce as the mastermind behind these events and proclaims victory over his deceased twin. Revealing his plan to use the high-energy generators as explosives, Jeremiah declares Bruce as his "very best friend" and unsuccessfully attempts to drive him insane in "one bad day" with Scarecrow's gas. Jeremiah is then approached by the immortal Ra's al Ghul, who proposes an alliance to "help" Bruce fulfill his destiny as "Gotham's Dark Knight". Jeremiah breaks into Wayne Manor and shoots Bruce's love-interest, Selina Kyle, and later abducts him. Although Ra's is killed, he and Jeremiah's plan to blow up Gotham's bridges with the generators and render the city a "No Man's Land" succeeds, and an ecstatic Jeremiah manages to vanish in the ensuing chaos.

After Gotham is cut-off from the rest of the world, Jeremiah forms his own fanatic cult with the help of his assistant Ecco, and occupies a large portion of the city designated as the "Dark Zone". He forces his men to dig a series of tunnels as a means of escape should the government decide to nuke the city. Jeremiah works with the Mad Hatter to produce a toxic gas at the abandoned Ace Chemicals plant, which he plans to release into Gotham's skies so that the government will no longer be able to send supplies into the city. Jeremiah subsequently has a surgeon perform plastic surgery on two kidnapped civilians to make them resemble Thomas and Martha Wayne, Bruce's deceased parents, in an attempt to re-enact the night of the Waynes' deaths so that he will become the most important person in Bruce's life; Jeremiah later captures James Gordon and Lee Thompkins and decides to use them instead due to their personal connection to Bruce. With Selina's help, Bruce thwarts Jeremiah's scheme and pursues him while Gordon drives the armed canisters of toxic gas into the river. Jeremiah falls into a vat of green liquid during his confrontation with Bruce at Ace Chemicals, after which his body is salvaged and placed in a hospital. Bruce tells to Selina that Jeremiah currently registers no brain activity in his comatose state.

Ten years later, a seemingly brain-dead Jeremiah is incarcerated in Arkham Asylum until it is revealed that he feigned being in a vegetative state to wait for Bruce's eventual return to Gotham. Jeremiah frames Harvey Bullock for murder, manipulates Oswald Cobblepot and Edward Nygma into taking the initial blame for his scheme, and has Ecco break him out of Arkham. After his escape, Jeremiah kidnaps James Gordon and Barbara Kean's daughter, but Ecco is stabbed in the confrontation. Jeremiah kills Ecco and takes Barbara Lee Gordon to Ace Chemicals, where he reveals to Gordon that he lost most of his memories after his fall into the green solutions over a decade ago. After telling Gordon to address him as "J", Jeremiah prepares to drop Barbara into the same vat only for Bruce to appear as Batman. Overjoyed by Bruce's arrival, Jeremiah simply laughs maniacally even when being slashed with batarangs but falls unconscious as one slashes his head.

==== Ecco ====
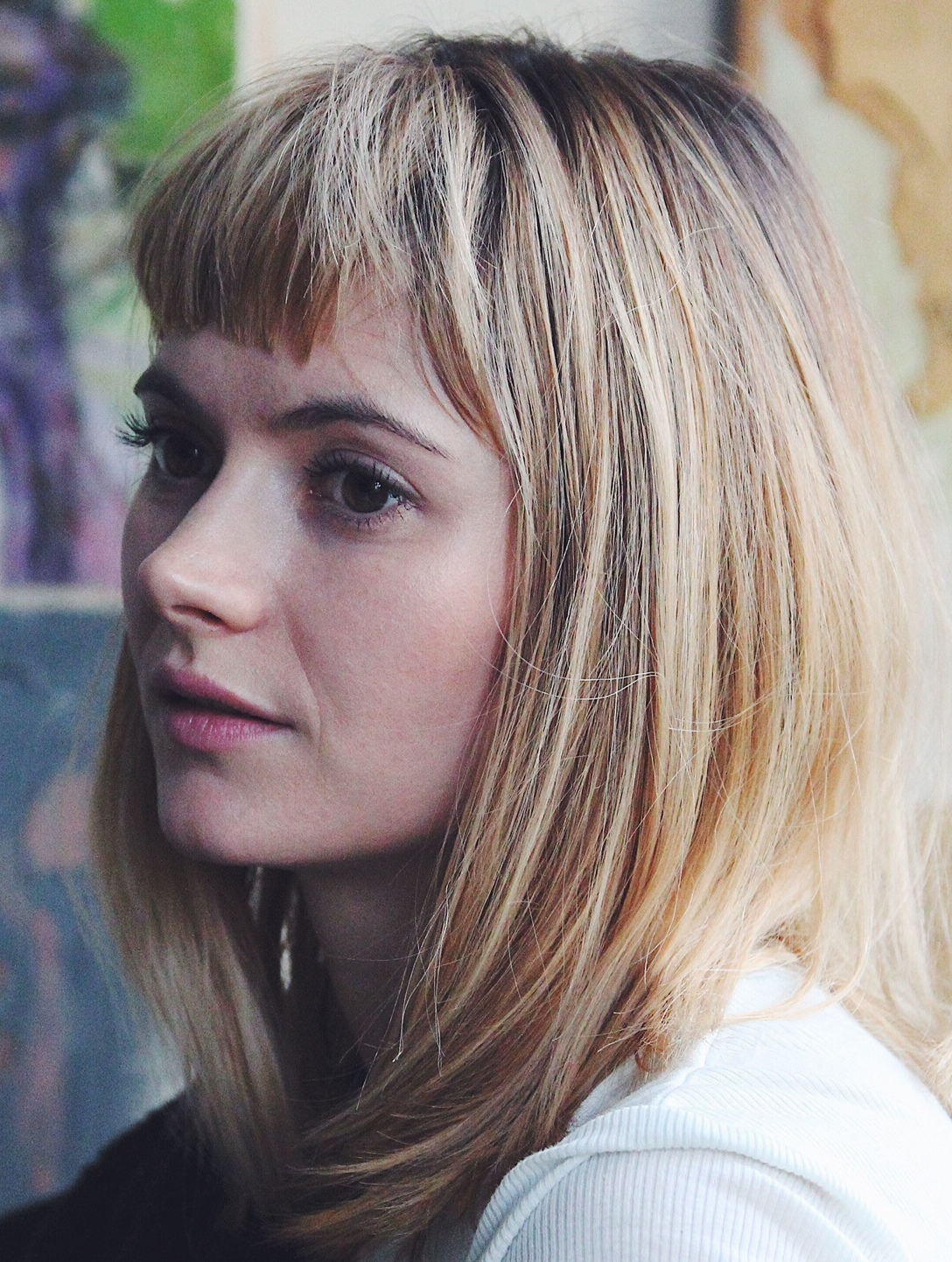
Francesca Root-Dodson

Ecco (portrayed by Francesca Root-Dodson) is the assistant and proxy of Jeremiah Valeska. After his transformation into a criminal and terrorist, Ecco continues acting as Jeremiah's right-hand woman and begins donning a jester costume, earning her the nickname "Mummer". She traps Jim Gordon inside the bunker with the bombs and later kills two guards for Jeremiah at Wayne Enterprises and the two of them use their keycards to break inside. After Gotham becomes No Man's Land, Ecco continues to work as Jeremiah's accomplice and henchwoman, breaking into GCPD and vandalizing their map with Jeremiah's symbol. In addition, she helps Jeremiah to establish the Church of Jeremiah Valeska as a way to gain followers.

Ten years later, Ecco poses as a nurse at Arkham Asylum. When Gordon is onto Jeremiah orchestrating the frame-up of Harvey Bullock, Ecco kills the two inmates bothering Jeremiah and tells him that the jig is up. Both of them head to the Sirens where they ambush Barbara Kean. Ecco is stabbed by Barbara and is critically injured. Jeremiah sadly muses on how Ecco is no longer his Ecco, and there'll be no one like her. Ecco smiles at this sentiment, before Jeremiah shoots and kills her, simply stating, "there'll be plenty more fish in the sea." Ecco is a precursor to and is inspired by Harley Quinn.

==== Lelia ====
Lelia (portrayed by Shiva Kalaiselvan) is a female member of the League of Shadows that becomes loyal to Barbara Kean.

=== Introduced in season 5 ===
==== Nyssa al Ghul / Theresa Walker ====
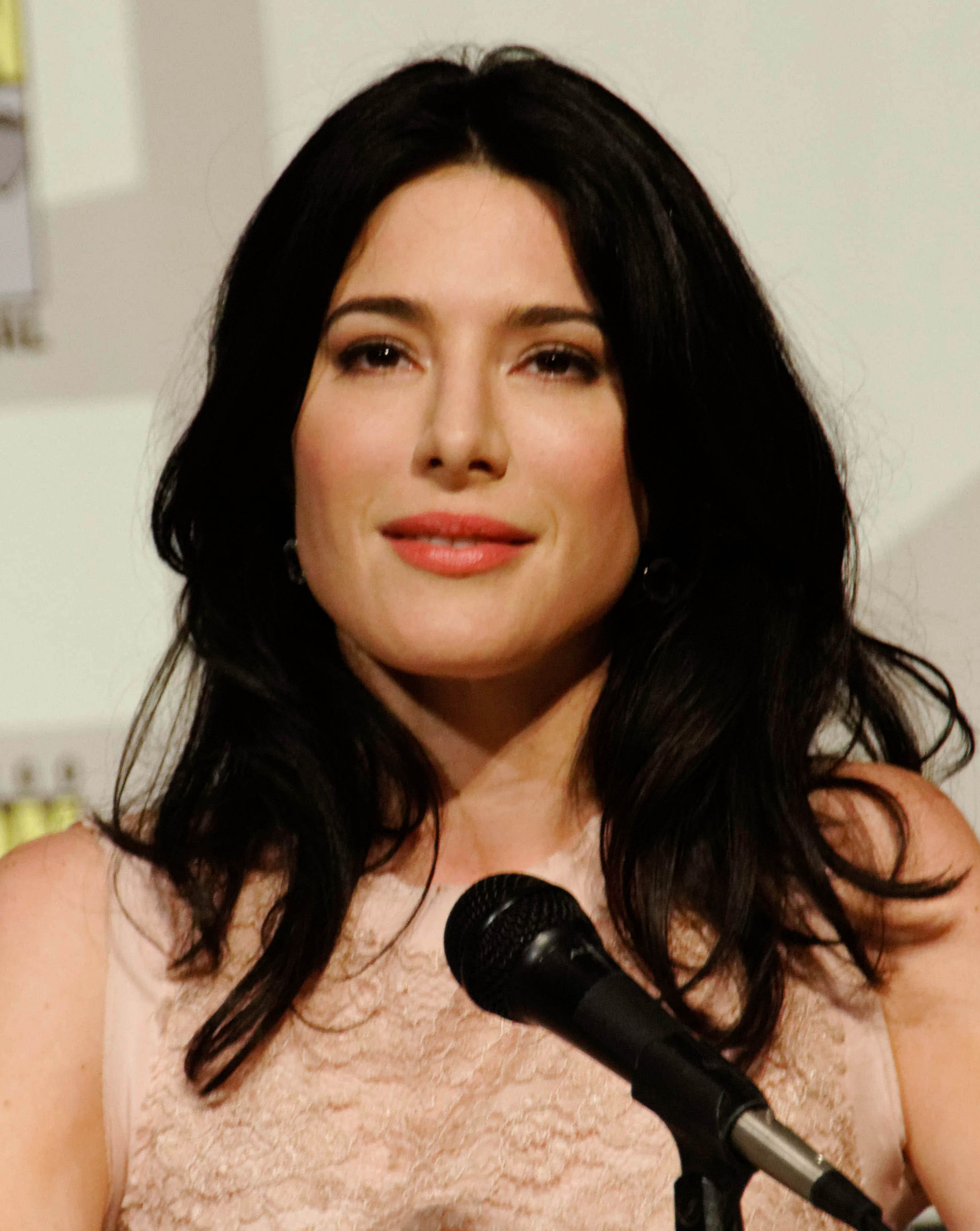
Jaime Murray

Nyssa al Ghul / Theresa Walker (portrayed by Jaime Murray) is the daughter of Ra's al Ghul. She emerges as Jim Gordon's principal nemesis in the season, who comes to Gotham harbouring a dark secret about her past. Theresa Walker sent Delta Force into Gotham City to reclaim it from the criminals and also manipulated Hugo Strange into putting a control chip in Riddler and Lee Thompkins' brains. After the broadcast of her ordering Riddler to use an RPG on Haven, Walker appeared in Gotham City and found Eduardo impaled but still alive on a bar. She provides him with a special mask as she plans to have Hugo Strange fix him up.

After Hugo Strange was done with the experiment that turned Eduardo into Bane and led in the capture of Jim Gordon, Bruce Wayne, and General Wade, Nyssa had Bane beat up Gordon in order to get Bruce to say the name of a certain person she knows. When he finally knows what Walker is talking about and quotes Ra's al Ghul, Walker introduces herself as his daughter Nyssa. While Gordon is taken away for Hugo Strange to work on, Nyssa states that she is going to take advantage of Special Order 386 (an order to reduce a city to rubble if it is irretrievably lost) to make Bruce suffer. Nyssa then heads out to target Barbara Kean due to her hand in her father's death. After Bane failed to catch Barbara, Nyssa headed to the Sirens and killed the female League of Assassins members present. Nyssa then knocked out Lee Thompkins and proceeded to introduce herself to Barbara while rubbing her hand on her newborn child.

When Gordon confronts Nyssa at City Hall during Special Order 386, both of them fight each other until Barbara stabbed her. Nyssa ordered General Wade to activate the fail-safe that results in General Wade's suicide as Nyssa escapes. She makes off in Penguin and Riddler's submarine with Penguin's dog Edward still inside.

==== Eduardo Dorrance / Bane ====
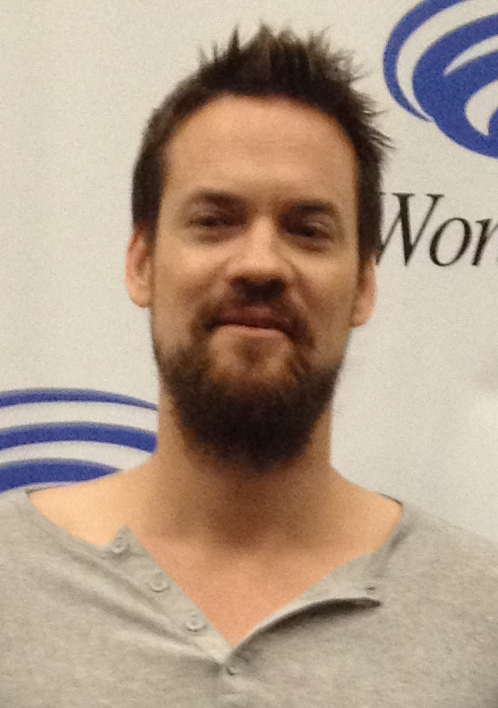
Shane West

Eduardo Dorrance / Bane (portrayed by Shane West) is a former army buddy of James Gordon who returns with a group of elite soldiers called Delta Force to help restore Gotham City from its "No Man's Land" state. In the past after Gordon's line of duty was over, Eduardo and his men became prisoners of war and were incarcerated at Pena Duro where he was put through one of the games where the guards bury someone alive and hold wagers to see if any prisoners would dig their way out. He is later freed by Nyssa al Ghul under the alias of Theresa Walker. Eduardo is in league with Theresa in her goals. When confronting Gordon at the ruins of Haven, Eduardo fought Gordon until he was impaled onto a pipe. Theresa found him and provided him with a special mask as she plans to have Hugo Strange fix him up.

After Hugo Strange was done working on him, Eduardo became Bane and led the mission to capture Jim Gordon, Bruce Wayne, and General Wade. Bane then tortured Gordon to the point when Bruce learned of Theresa's connection with Ra's al Ghul as she states that she is his daughter Nyssa. After figuring out Barbara Kean's hand in her father's death, Nyssa sends Bane to bring her Barbara. Bane raided the hospital and chased after Barbara and Lee Thompkins. He did catch up to Barbara and Lee after Barbara gave birth in the ambulance lot. Alfred and Selina bought the two of them time to get away. While Bane knocked Selina to the ground, he beat up Alfred and threw him back first into a nearby pole before getting away.

As Special Order 386 is activated, Bane led the Delta Force and the army into leveling Gotham. He briefly fought Bruce Wayne and Selina Kyle following Wayne Enterprise's detonation. Bruce was able to use a beacon on Bane that caused him to be attacked by bats. As Bane and Angel lead their forces into confronting Gordon, Bullock, Bruce, Selina, Penguin, Riddler, and Lee, Barbara arrived with the refugees as Gordon asks the army if they are with Gotham or against Gotham. The army turned against Bane as he, Angel, and those on his side are arrested. It was mentioned that Bane has been remanded to a prison.

==== Will Thomas ====
Will Thomas (portrayed by Hunter Jones) is an orphan enslaved to the Soothsayers who escapes where he receives help from Jim Gordon. He is killed when Haven was blown up by a mind-controlled Riddler using an RPG. Will appears in a near-death hallucination that Jim has after he was wounded by Victor Zsasz.

== Guest characters ==
=== Introduced in season 1 ===
- Patrick "Matches" Malone (portrayed by Danny Schoch in the first appearance, Michael Bowen in the second appearance) – A philosophical hitman-for-hire who is one of Gotham City's deadliest murderers. He is the masked man in shiny shoes who killed Thomas and Martha Wayne in front of Bruce Wayne and a nearby Selina Kyle. This has led Detective James Gordon into finding him in order to bring him to justice. Under torture by an operative of Bruce Wayne, Silver St. Cloud revealed the identity of the killer to be Patrick Malone. When Bruce finally confronts Patrick with his suspicions, Patrick stated that he was tired of doing bad things while barely recalling if he killed Bruce's parents and Bruce decides not to kill Patrick. Using the gun that Bruce left behind, Patrick committed suicide by the time James Gordon caught up with Bruce. Gordon and Bullock were left wondering who could have hired Malone to kill Thomas and Martha Wayne. It is later revealed that Hugo Strange contracted Patrick to kill the Waynes on behalf of the Court of Owls.
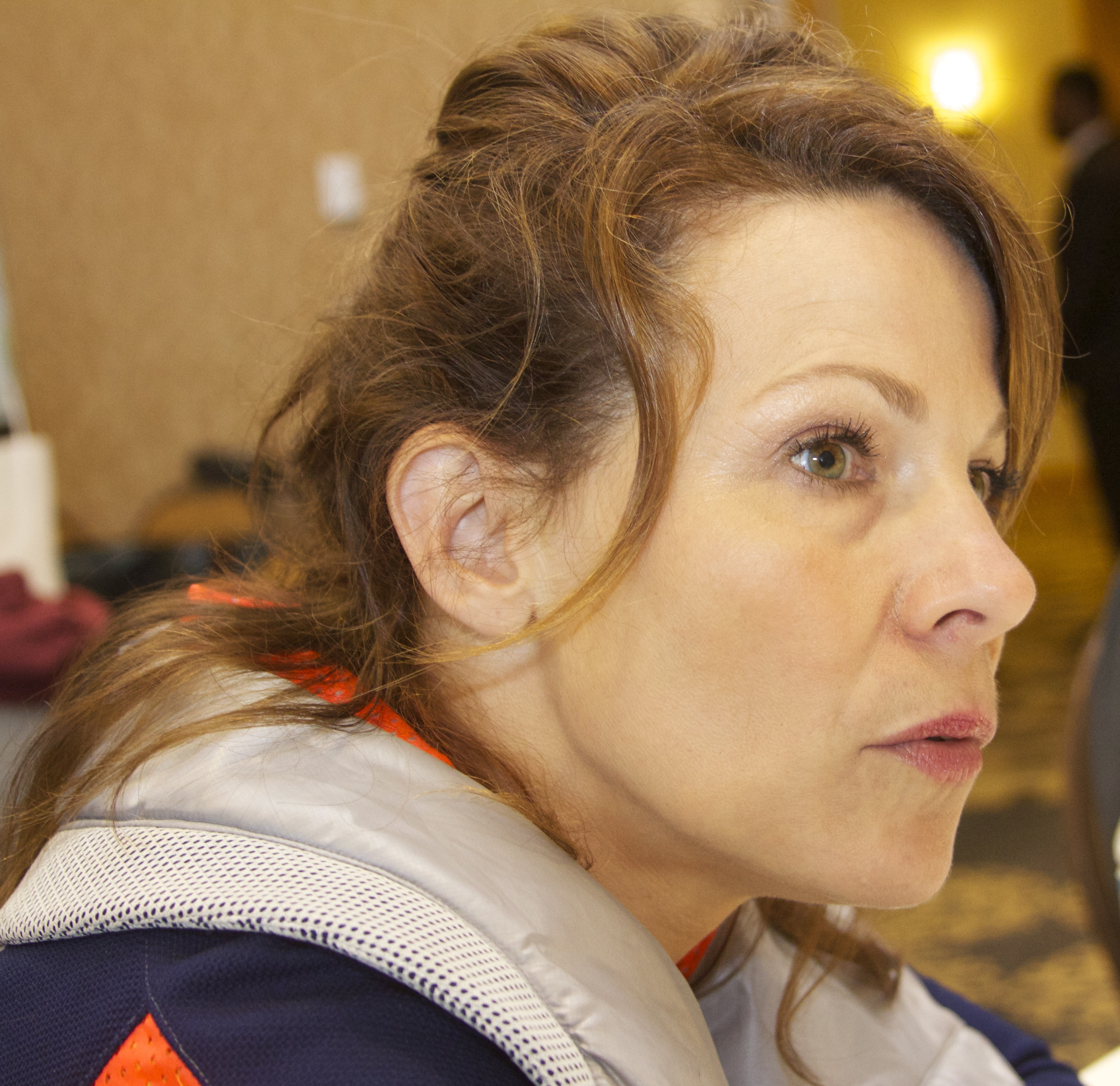
- Lili Taylor
  Patti (portrayed by Lili Taylor) – A female minion of Dollmaker who alongside Doug oversaw the child trafficking ring that involved abducting street kids and shipping them overseas to Dollmaker. Their plot was foiled by the Gotham City Police Department.
- Doug (portrayed by Frank Whaley) – A minion of Dollmaker who alongside Patti oversaw the child trafficking ring that involved abducting street kids and shipping them overseas to Dollmaker. Their plot was foiled by the Gotham City Police Department.
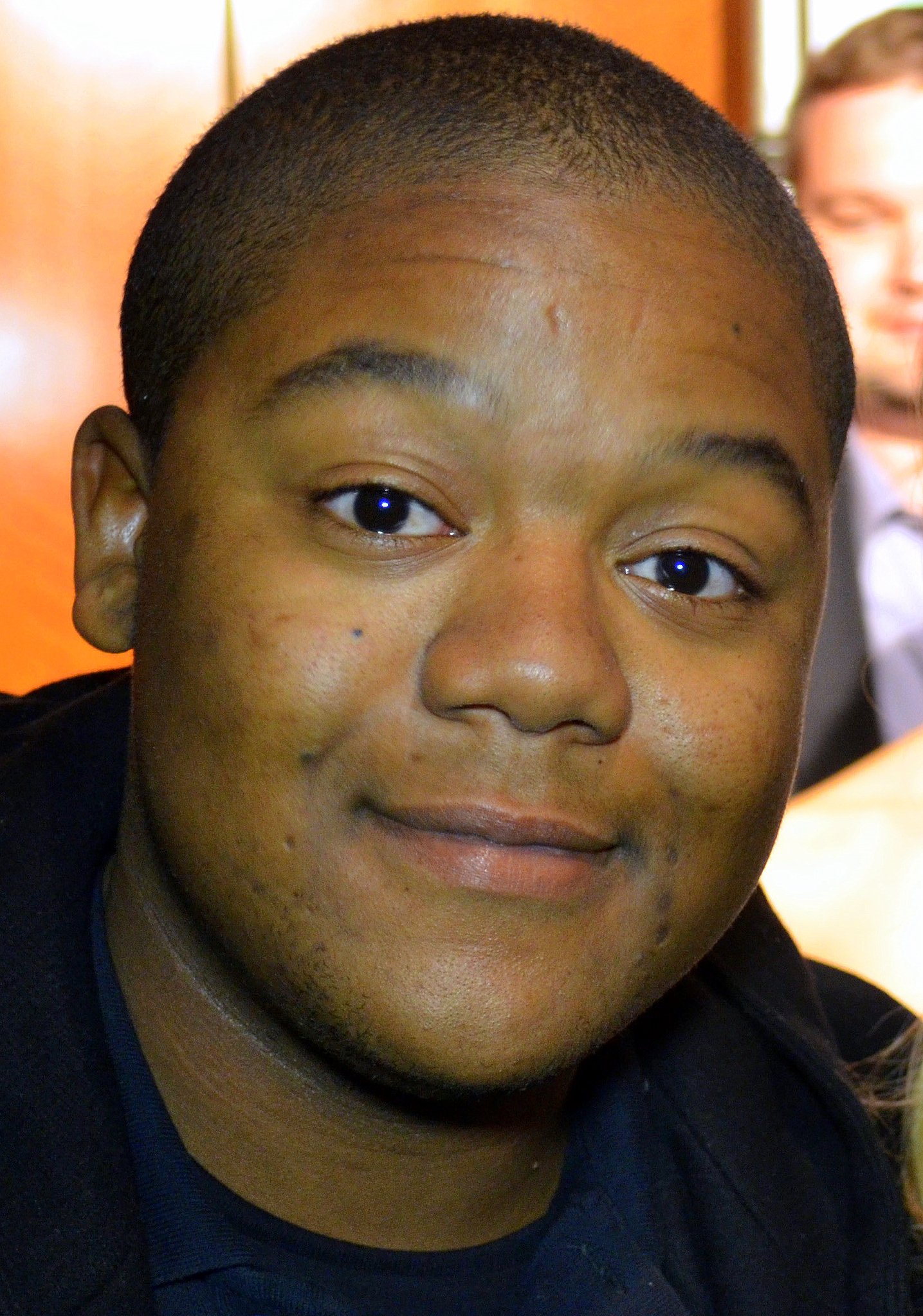
- Kyle Massey
  Mackey (portrayed by Kyle Massey) – A street kid who knows Selina Kyle. It was him who informed James Gordon and Harvey Bullock about Patti and Doug's child trafficking plot as he had evaded capture. Harvey Bullock and Alfred Pennyworth later talk with Mackey about where Selina Kyle might be heading after she and Bruce fled during Copperhead's attack on Wayne Manor. Upon being bribed by Alfred Pennyworth, Mackey told Harvey and Alfred that Selina will head to her fence and suggests they speak to Fish Mooney about where to find Selina's fence.
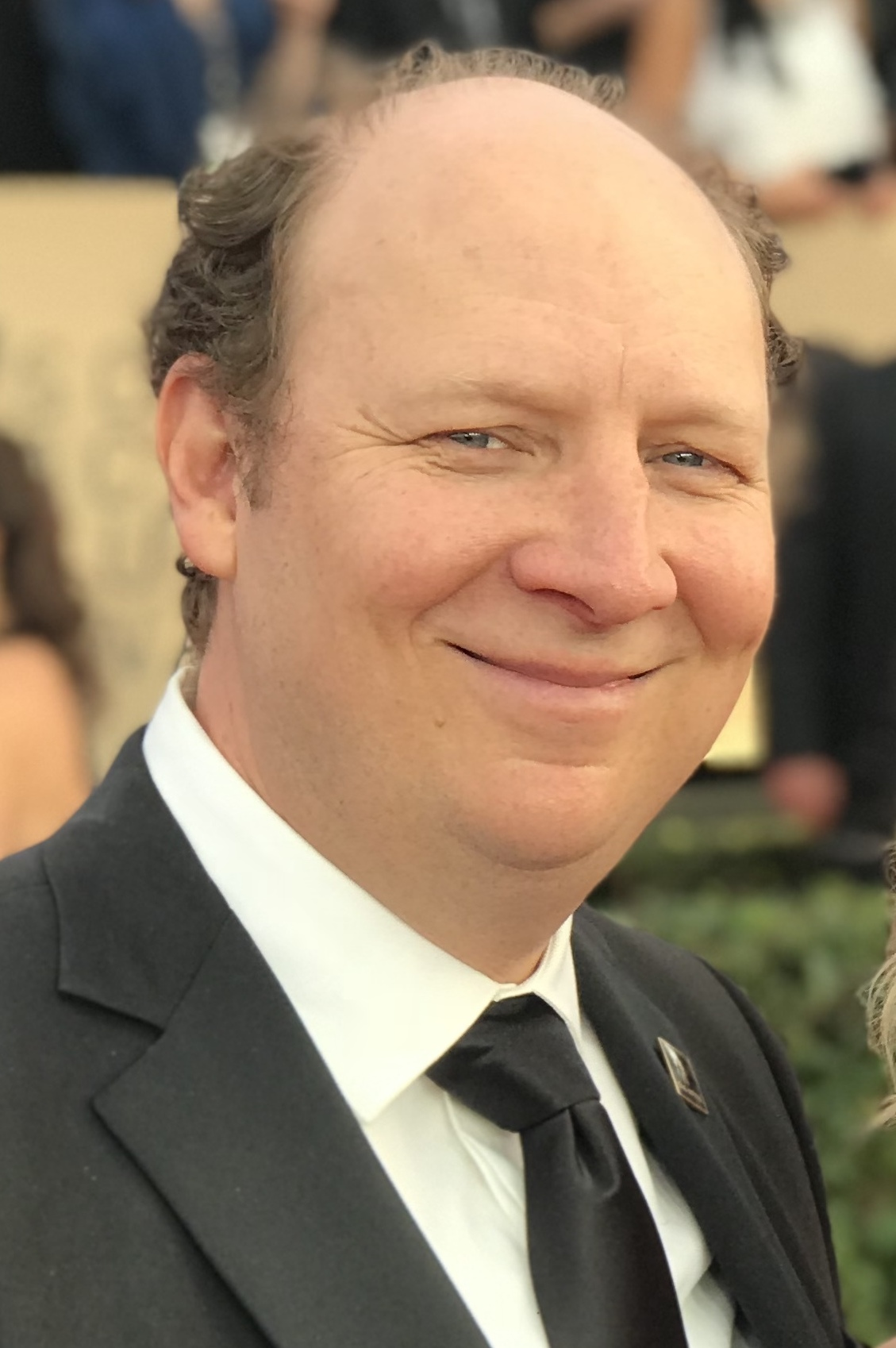
- Dan Bakkedahl
  Balloonman / Davis Lamond (portrayed by Dan Bakkedahl) – A social worker for Gotham Juvenile Services who secretly operates as a vigilante that murders corrupt people by attaching them to weather balloons causing them to float to the Earth's atmosphere. His targets include Ronald Danzer (a businessman who scammed countless people in a ponzi scheme), Lt. Bill Cranston of the GCPD (who was prone to violence), and Cardinal Quinn (who committed accounts of child molestation). He is defeated by Gordon and Bullock and loaded into the ambulance before he can make plans to target Mayor Aubrey James for the plans he made for Gotham's street children.
- Bill Cranston (portrayed by James Colby) – A corrupt police lieutenant at the Gotham City Police Department who is prone to violence. He is killed by Balloonman.
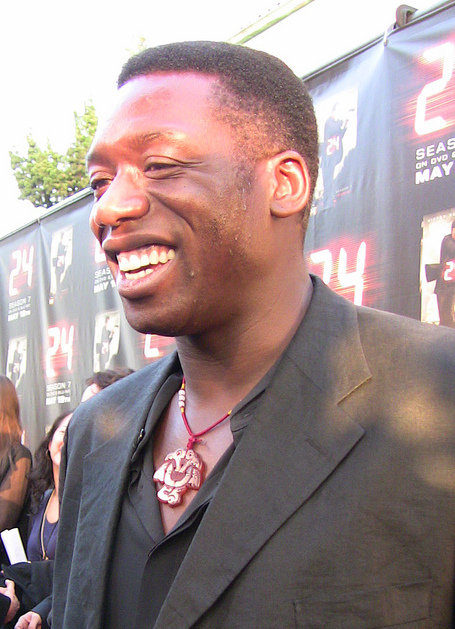
- Hakeem Kae-Kazim
  Hitman (portrayed by Hakeem Kae-Kazim) – An unidentified hitman-for-hire who stole the identity of Richard Gladwell upon murdering him. Using Richard's trademark telescopic weapon, the hitman was responsible for killing Councilman Ron Jenkins and his aide on Sal Maroni's orders. Then he burned Councilman Zeller alive on the Arkham Asylum grounds under Carmine Falcone's orders. Before he can kill Aubrey James on Sal Maroni's orders, the hitman is gunned down by James Gordon and Harvey Bullock.
- Lou (portrayed by James Georgiades) – The manager of Bamonte's Restaurant who is a good friend of Sal Maroni and was the one who hired Oswald Cobblepot to work as the restaurant's new dishwasher. He is later killed by robbers that were secretly hired by Cobblepot.
- Molly Mathis (portrayed by Sharon Washington) – A middle management worker at Wayne Enterprises who is part of the illegal activities done by some of the company's members. She also oversees the pharmaceutical company WellZyn which is a subsidiary of Wayne Enterprises.
- Stan Potolsky (portrayed by Daniel London) – A biochemist that formerly worked at WellZyn and created the drug known as Viper (a prototype version of Venom). During a confrontation between James Gordon and Harvey Bullock, Stan Potolsky tipped them off about Warehouse 39 before committing suicide by falling off the roof.
- Nikolai (portrayed by Jeremy Davidson) – The leader of the Russian mafia in Gotham City that is under Carmine Falcone's power. He secretly worked with Fish Mooney in plans to overthrow Falcone. Nikolai is later killed by Oswald Cobblepot during the Maroni Crime Family's raid on his hideout.
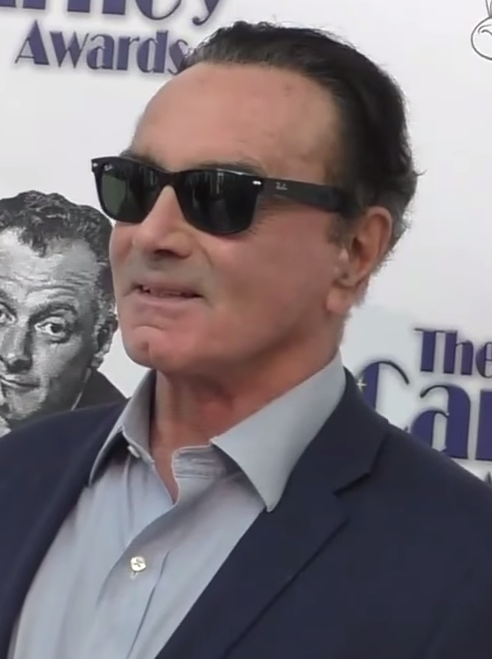
- Dan Hedaya
  Dix (portrayed by Dan Hedaya) – A former homicide detective and partner of Harvey Bullock who was crippled in the line of duty by Randall Milkie. When Gotham City was declared "no man's land", Dix became a target of Jane Doe ever since, Harvey, Boggs, and Lewis had arrested her mother Victoria Cartwright. Dix was strangled to death by Jane Doe in the form of Harvey.
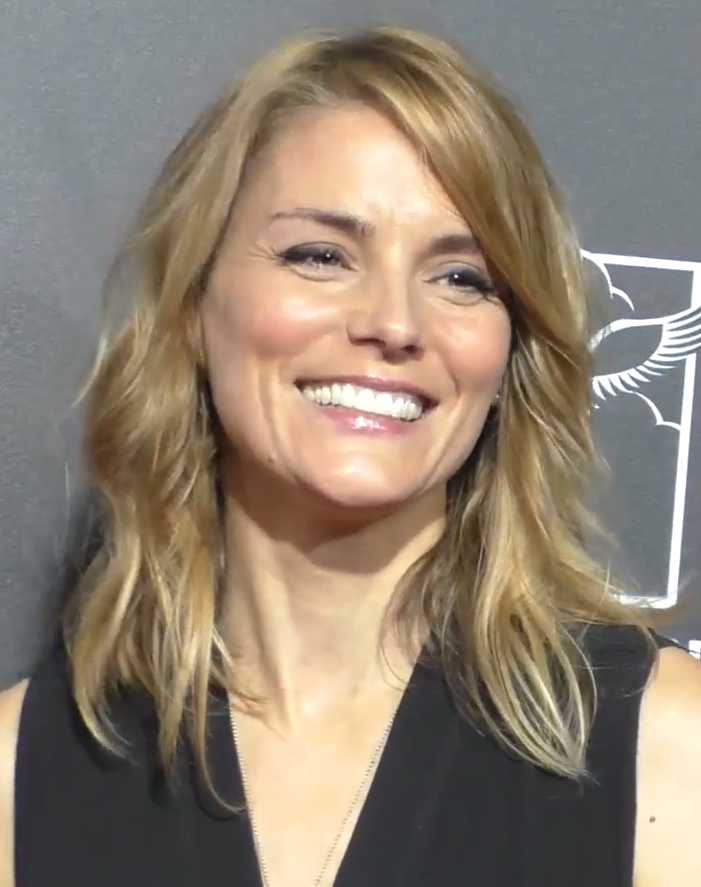
- Susan Misner
  Dr. Marks (portrayed by Susan Misner) – A hypnotherapist who hypnotized Randall Milkie and Raymond Earl into becoming the "Spirit of the Goat" to kill people in the belief that negative re-enforcement would act as therapy for Gotham. She was shot in the leg and arrested by Harvey Bullock.
- Raymond Earl / The Goat (portrayed by Christopher James Baker) – One of the few people to have been hypnotized by Dr. Marks into becoming a serial killer known as "the Goat" as part of a conspiracy. Earl believes that he is the embodiment of "the Spirit of the Goat" and that it compels him to murder the daughters of wealthy citizens of Gotham City.
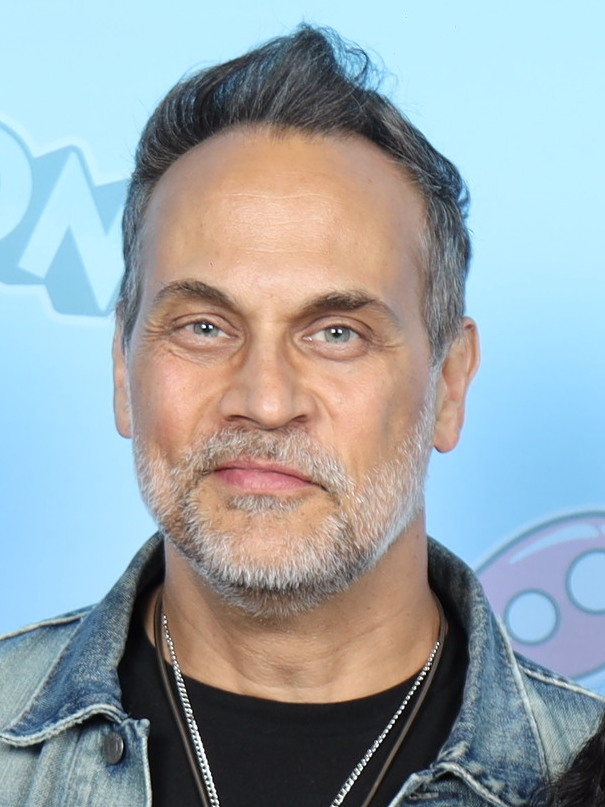
- Todd Stashwick
  Richard Sionis / The Mask (portrayed by Todd Stashwick) – The corrupt CEO of Sionis Investments who owns parts of Gotham City. He secretly ran an underground fight club while wearing a black mask before he was publicly exposed in a struggle with James Gordon and arrested by the police. He ended up incarcerated at Arkham Asylum. Richard is sprung from Arkham by Theo Galavan's henchmen to serve him. Sionis declined the offer and is whip-strangled and repeatedly stabbed to death by Tabitha Galavan. This was part of Theo's warning to the other freed Arkham inmates about the fate of those who do not want to serve the Galavans.
- Tommy Elliot (portrayed by Cole Vallis in season 1, Gordon Winarick in season 4) – During Bruce Wayne's brief time as a student at Anders Preparatory Academy, fellow student Tommy Elliot bullied and teased Wayne. When Tommy was confronted by Wayne outside his house, Bruce later beats up Tommy Elliot with his late father's watch wrapped around his fist. Tommy later became Bruce's friend and no longer taunts him.
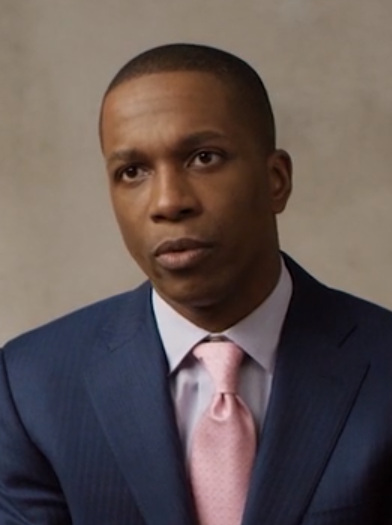
- Leslie Odom Jr.
  Ian Hargrove (portrayed by Leslie Odom Jr.) – An insane bombmaker who was originally incarcerated at Blackgate Penitentiary. While being transferred to a mental hospital, the prison van he was in was intercepted by the Russian Mob led by Gregor Kasyanov where they threatened him to make bombs in exchange that his brother John does not become their target. Upon ending up in police custody when most of the Russian Mob present were killed by a bomb that was set off by Butch Gilzean, Ian Hargrove was among the patients of the recently opened Arkham Asylum.
- Gregor Kasyanov (portrayed by Steve Cirbus) – A lieutenant in the Russian Mob who later succeeded Nikolai upon his death. In retaliation to Nikolai's death, Gregor Kasyanov had Ian Hargrove's medical hospital transport intercepted so that he can have Ian make bombs for him in exchange that they do not do away with his brother John. With these bombs, Gregor and his men hit Falcone's money supply with the funds being blown up by Butch Gilzean and leaving the surviving Russians in police custody. Gregor was among the Russians that were caught in that explosion.
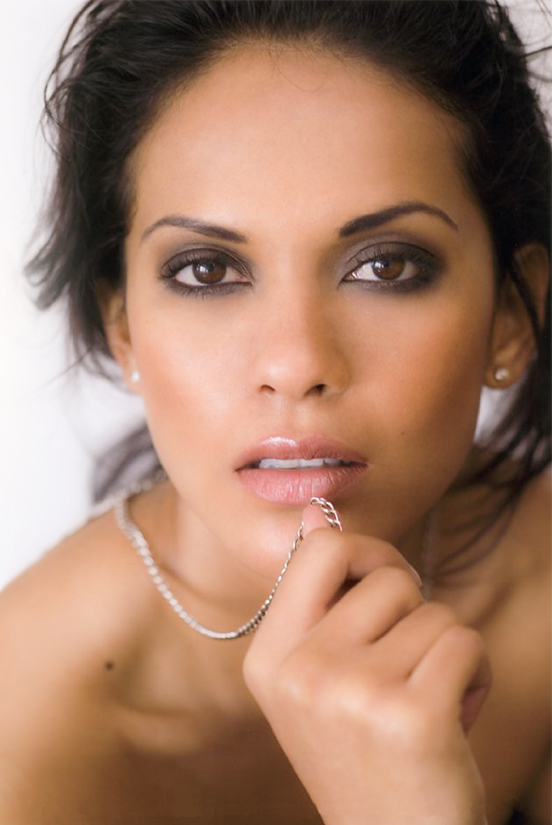
- Lesley-Ann Brandt
  Larissa Diaz / Copperhead (portrayed by Lesley-Ann Brandt) – A contorting assassin hired by an as-yet-unknown person to kill witnesses to the Wayne murders.
- Jimmy Saviano (portrayed by John Enos III) – The underboss of the Falcone crime family who is a childhood friend of Butch Gilzean. He is later killed by Butch Gilzean over a bad deal.
- Gerry Lang (portrayed by Isiah Whitlock Jr.) – The strict director of Arkham Asylum when it reopened. He oversees Jim Gordon after Mayor Aubrey James reassigns him to guard duty at Arkham Asylum. Gerry was later killed by Jack Buchinsky and Aaron Danzig when he stumbled onto their escape plot. He was later succeeded by Hugo Strange.
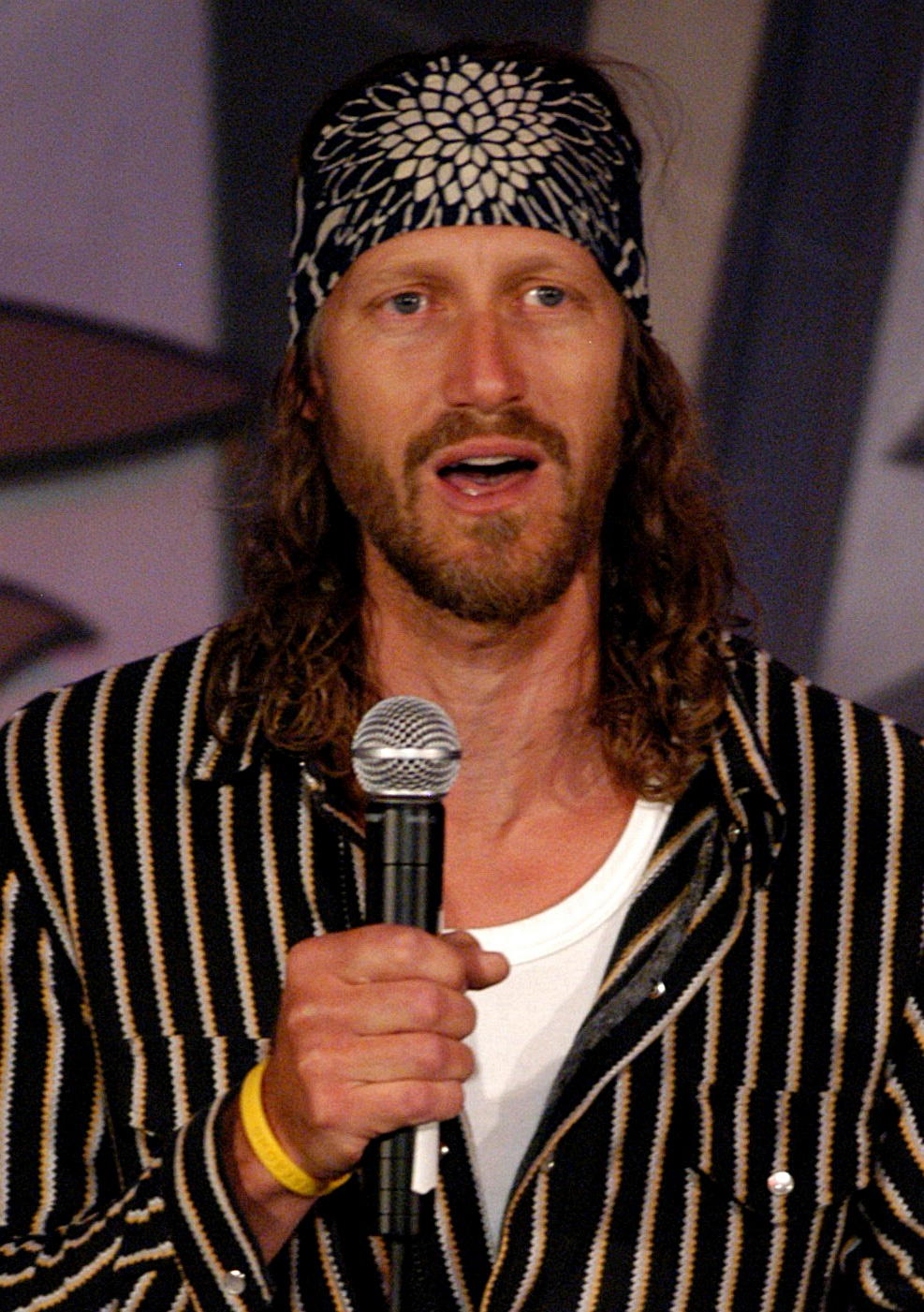
- Christopher Heyerdahl
  Electrocutioner / Jack Buchinsky (portrayed by Christopher Heyerdahl) – A former mafia bank robber who uses electricity-based weapons and technology in his vendetta against Sal Maroni. Following his arrest, he passes himself off as an inmate of Arkham Asylum under the alias "Jack Gruber" in which he experiments on other inmates with electroconvulsive therapy. He escapes from Arkham Asylum with his ideal prototype of a factotum named Aaron Danzig after killing two guards and the asylum's director Gerry Lang. Buchinsky is later recaptured in a struggle with James Gordon after he uses liquid to short out Buchinsky's gear during his attack on the Gotham City Police Department.
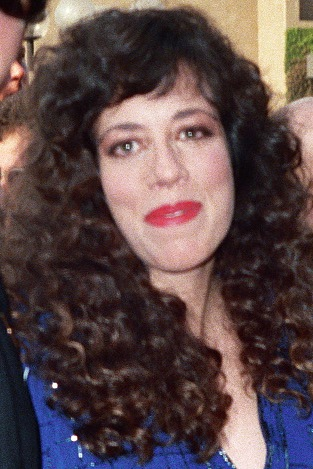
- Allyce Beasley
  Dorothy Duncan (portrayed by Allyce Beasley) – An Arkham Asylum patient who posed as a nurse. She was trampled to death by the inmates amongst the chaos caused by Jack Buchinsky.
- Aaron Danzig (portrayed by Kevin McCormick) – An Arkham Asylum inmate on whom Jack Buchinsky experimented. He later escaped with him to assist in his revenge on Sal Maroni. Both of them are defeated by James Gordon.
- Everett Kean (portrayed by Richard Poe) – The wealthy father of Barbara Kean. He and his wife are killed when Ogre forced Barbara to murder them at their upstate home.
- Mrs. Kean (portrayed by Caroline Lagerfelt) – The unnamed wealthy mother of Barbara Kean. She and her husband are killed when the Ogre forced Barbara to murder them at their upstate home.
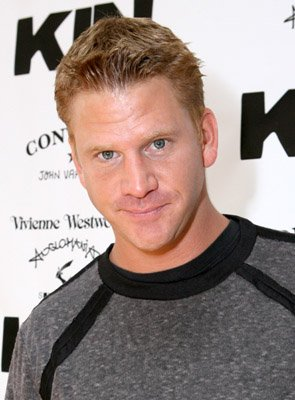
- Dash Mihok
  Arnold Flass (portrayed by Dash Mihok) – A corrupt narcotics detective in Gotham City Police Department who has an interest in Kristen Kringle and openly mocks Edward Nygma. Flass has ties to organized crime and the drug trade in Gotham City. He is later arrested by Gordon, Essen, and Alvarez for killing Leon Winkler, a witness to a drug-related murder. Due to his hold over Harvey Bullock, Loeb later has Flass exonerated and reinstated. After Gordon discovered the actions of Loeb's daughter Miriam, he used her as leverage to get Bullock's file from Loeb and to have Flass tried for his crimes.
- Derek Delaware (portrayed by Niko Nicotera) – A detective in the GCPD's Narcotics Department.
- Dr. Guerra (portrayed by Philip Hernandez) – The medical examiner at Gotham City Police Department. Nygma later framed him for stealing body parts which led to his suspension.
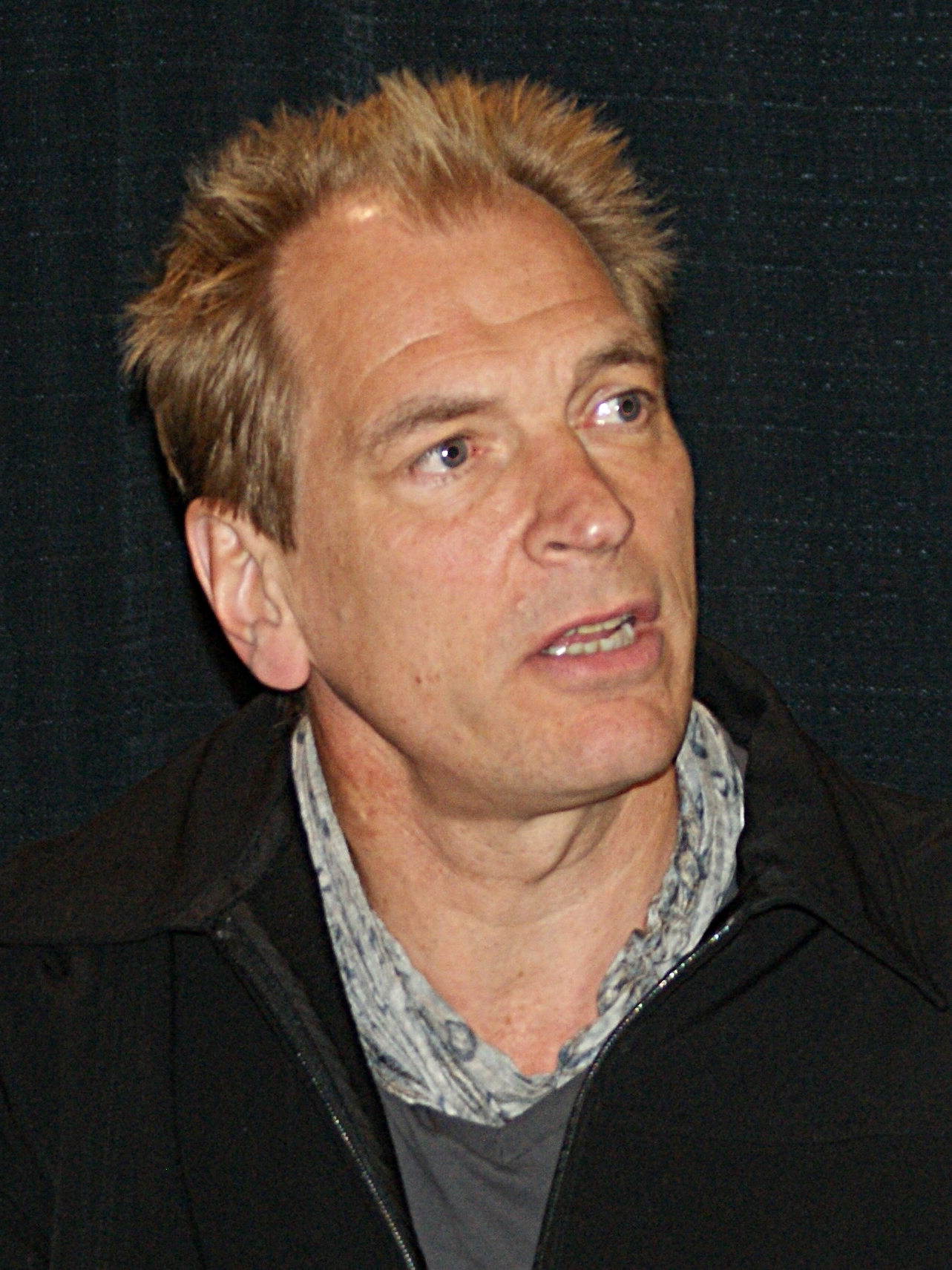
- Julian Sands
  Gerald Crane (portrayed by Julian Sands) – A serial killer posing as "Todd", a member of a support group for people with severe phobias. Crane kidnaps members of the support group and extracts their adrenal glands while exposing them to their greatest fear before killing them. Crane uses the adrenal glands to create a fear-inducing toxin that he uses to eradicate his own fear. Crane is later killed in a gunfight with James Gordon and Harvey Bullock.
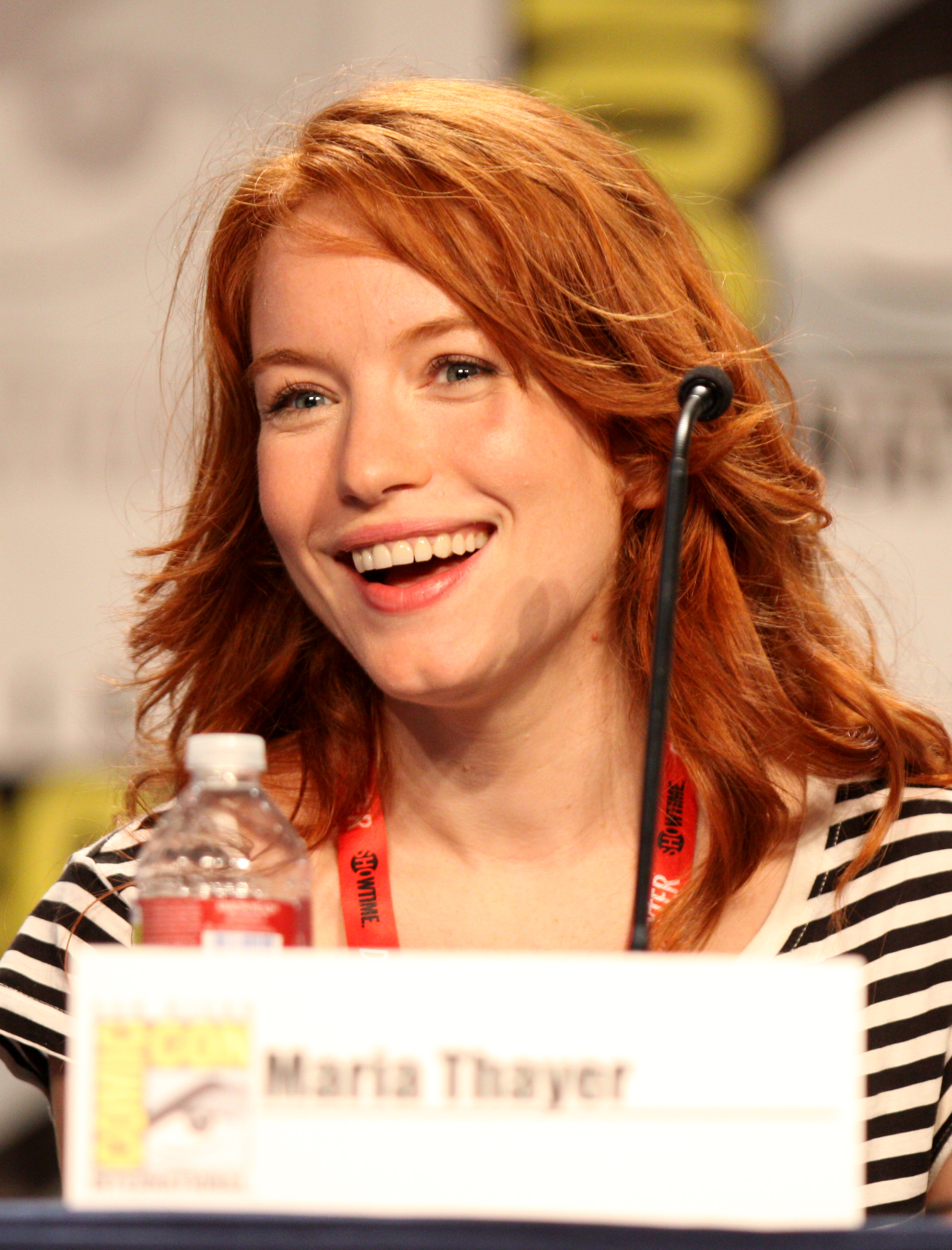
- Maria Thayer
  Scottie Mullen (portrayed by Maria Thayer) – A counselor for people suffering with phobias. She was kidnapped by Gerald Crane, who tried to drown her in Lemmars Park (Where she almost drowned as a child, which caused her phobia for swimming pools). Once they arrived, Jim Gordon chased after Gerald while Harvey rescued Scottie. She later became Harvey's fiancee and Harvey eventually quit the GCPD. After Harvey rejoined the GCPD, Scottie changed her mind about the marriage.
- John Grayson (portrayed by Robert Gorrie) – A member of the Flying Graysons at Haly's Circus who gets engaged to Mary Lloyd after a dispute is resolved between their two families.
- Mary Lloyd (portrayed by Abbi Snee) – A performer at Haly's Circus who is the fiancé and sometimes rival of John Grayson. She gets engaged to John after a dispute between the Flying Graysons and the Lloyds are settled.
- Paul Cicero (portrayed by Mark Margolis) – A blind fortune teller at Haly's Circus and the biological father of Jerome Valeska. After leaving Haly's Circus, Paul is later killed by Jerome and Tabitha Galavan.
- Red Hood Gang – The Red Hood Gang was a gang of bank robbers. Their leader always wore a red hood. Most of the time, other members of the team would turn against him after the crime. While most of the members were either killed by each other or during a shootout with the police, the red hood was claimed by an unnamed person while the police officers still at the crime scene were not looking. A second version of the Red Hood Gang was formed by Butch Gilzean in order to crash Mayor Oswald Cobblepot's events. To avoid Cobblepot finding out that he was behind the Red Hood Gang, Gilzean kills the entire Red Hood Gang upon Cobblepot and Nygma's arrival.
  - Gus Floyd (portrayed by Michael Goldsmith) – A member of the first Red Hood Gang, Gus Floyd stole money from banks and gave to the poor. Under the belief that his red hood protected him from danger, Floyd proclaimed that whoever wore the red hood should lead the gang. Floyd was subsequently murdered by Clyde Destro, who stole his hood.
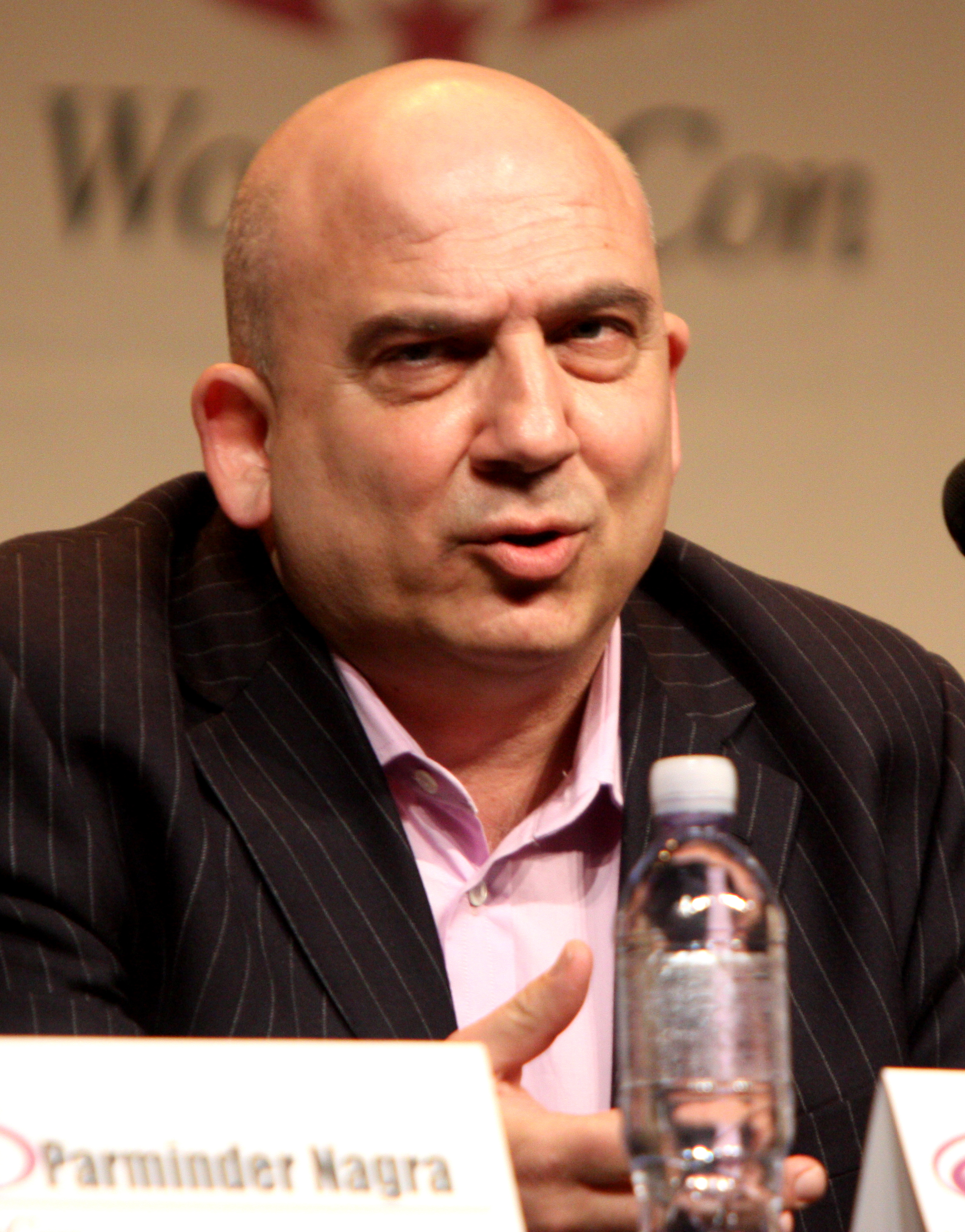
  - Jonny Coyne
    Clyde Destro (portrayed by Jonny Coyne) – A member of the first Red Hood Gang. He was a baker who joined the group after he was denied a loan from different banks. Clyde became the Red Hood after killing Gus Floyd. He was later shot by Trope who took the red hood before James Gordon and Harvey Bullock arrived. As Clyde was found wounded on the ground, the denied loans they found was a clue to the Red Hood Gang's next target. According to the "Gotham Chronicle" website, Clyde survived the gun wound and is in police custody.
  - Trope (portrayed by Peter Brensinger) – A member of the first Red Hood Gang. He was the third person to become the Red Hood upon claiming it from Clyde Destro. During the Red Hood Gang's next heist, Trope and the remaining gun members were gunned down by the police.
  - Regan (portrayed by Kevin T. Collins) – A member of the first Red Hood Gang. He was killed in a gun fight with the police.
  - Haskins (portrayed by Peter Albrink) – A member of the first Red Hood Gang. He was killed in a gun fight with the police.
  - Unidentified Red Hood Gang Leader (portrayed by Michael Stoyanov) – The unnamed leader of the second Red Hood Gang. He and his fellow Red Hood Gang members were killed by Butch Gilzean.
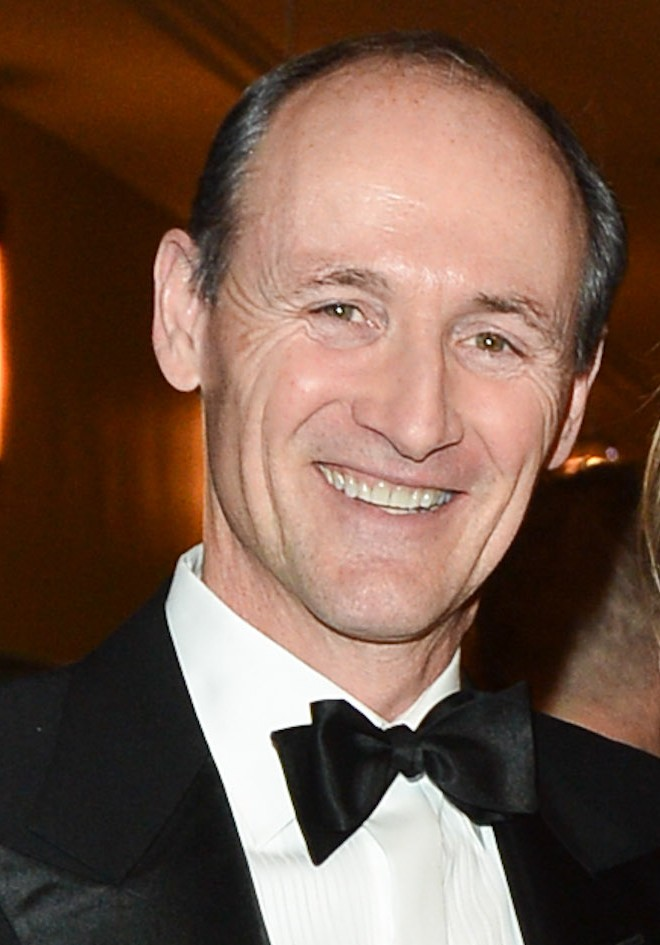
- Colm Feore
  Francis Dulmacher / The Dollmaker (portrayed by Colm Feore) – Dr. Francis Dulmacher is a European mad scientist with little moral code who is the mastermind behind the abductions of people for the purpose of harvesting their organs for his surgical experiments and for his underground organ trade business. The Dollmaker's experiments include the making of dolls out of human flesh, although he claims to have the means to resurrect the dead. After Fish Mooney started her escape attempt from the island, Fish's allies beat Dulmacher down.
- Thomas Schmidt (portrayed by Elliot Villar) – A guard that works for Dollmaker. He is charged with guarding the Dollmaker's prisoners.
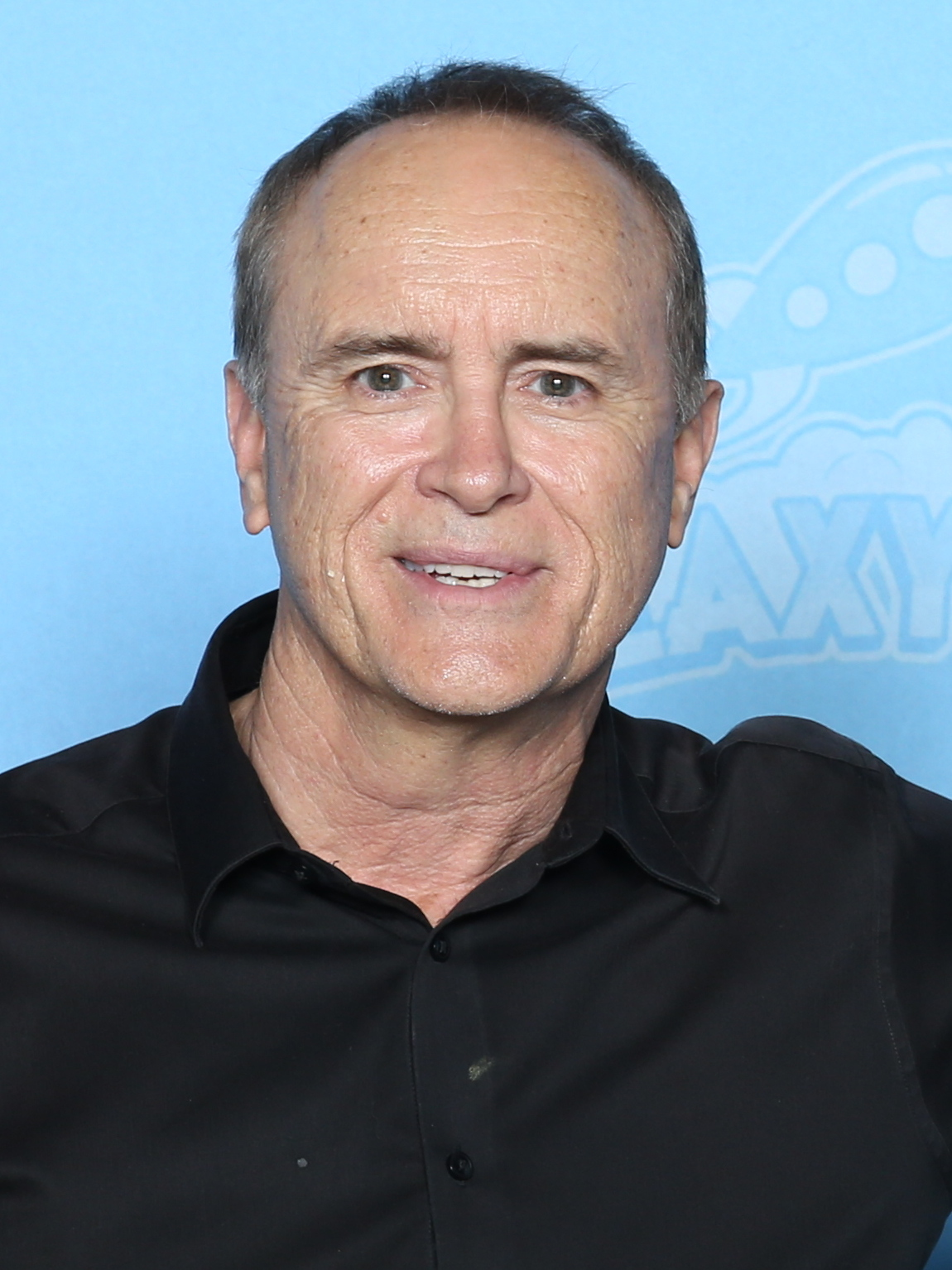
- Jeffrey Combs
  Office Manager (portrayed by Jeffrey Combs) – He is the unnamed office manager working for Dollmaker at his island facility to oversee the harvesting of body parts from the Dollmaker's prisoners. After Mooney ripped out her eye and destroyed it to avoid being used for parts like the other prisoners, Dollmaker demoted him for his failure and punished him by disassembling his body and reassembling it with different female body parts. The former office manager's fate was Dollmaker's way of showing Mooney how anyone who fails him can still be of use.
- Reginald "Reggie" Payne (portrayed by David O'Hara, Gotham; James Lewis, Pennyworth) – An old comrade of Alfred's from the Special Air Service who is secretly working for the board of directors of Wayne Enterprises (namely Molly Mathis and Sid Bunderslaw) as a private investigator. When Alfred stumbled upon Reginald doing something suspicious by the board where Bruce was doing his investigation, Reginald got surprised and stabbed Alfred which caused him to be hospitalized after Reginald fled. After telling Bruce Wayne that Sid Bunderslaw was behind the investigation with Bruce hesitant to push Reginald out the window while getting his drugs that was hanging outside the window, Reginald was pushed out of the window to his death by Selina Kyle to keep him from telling Sid Bunderslaw about Bruce's suspicions of him.
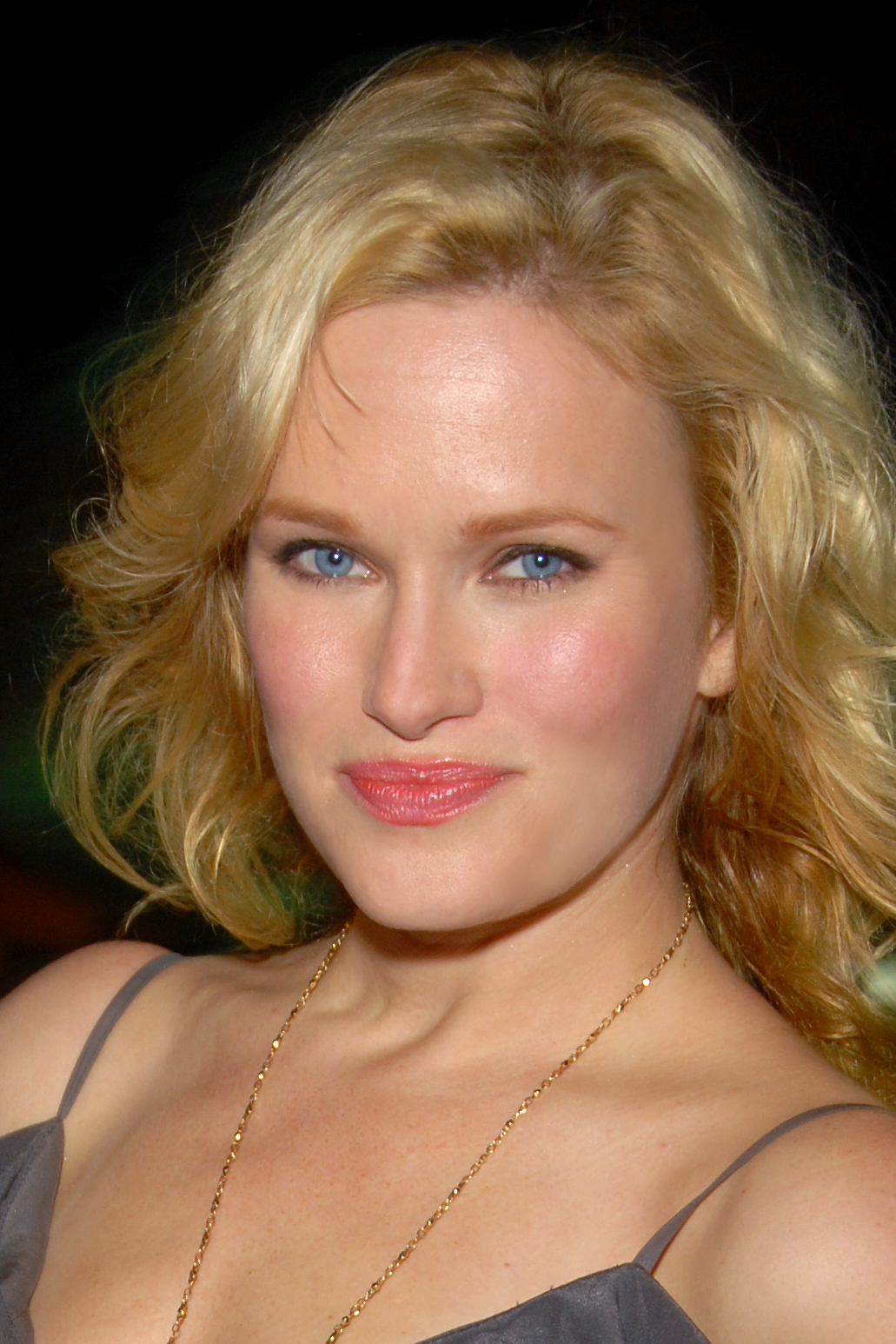
- Nicholle Tom
  Miriam Loeb (portrayed by Nicholle Tom) – The mentally disturbed daughter of Gillian Loeb who in her earlier life had killed her mother because she disrupted her "performance". Loeb covered up her daughter's actions to make it look like an accident and had her placed in the attic of a house he owned that is inhabited by Jude and Marge who work for Loeb. When Gordon and Bullock discovered her and learned of her past, Gordon used this as leverage on Loeb where he wants Bullock's file and Arnold Flass tried for his crimes in exchange that Miriam does not end up in Arkham Asylum. Loeb had to go along with the deal.
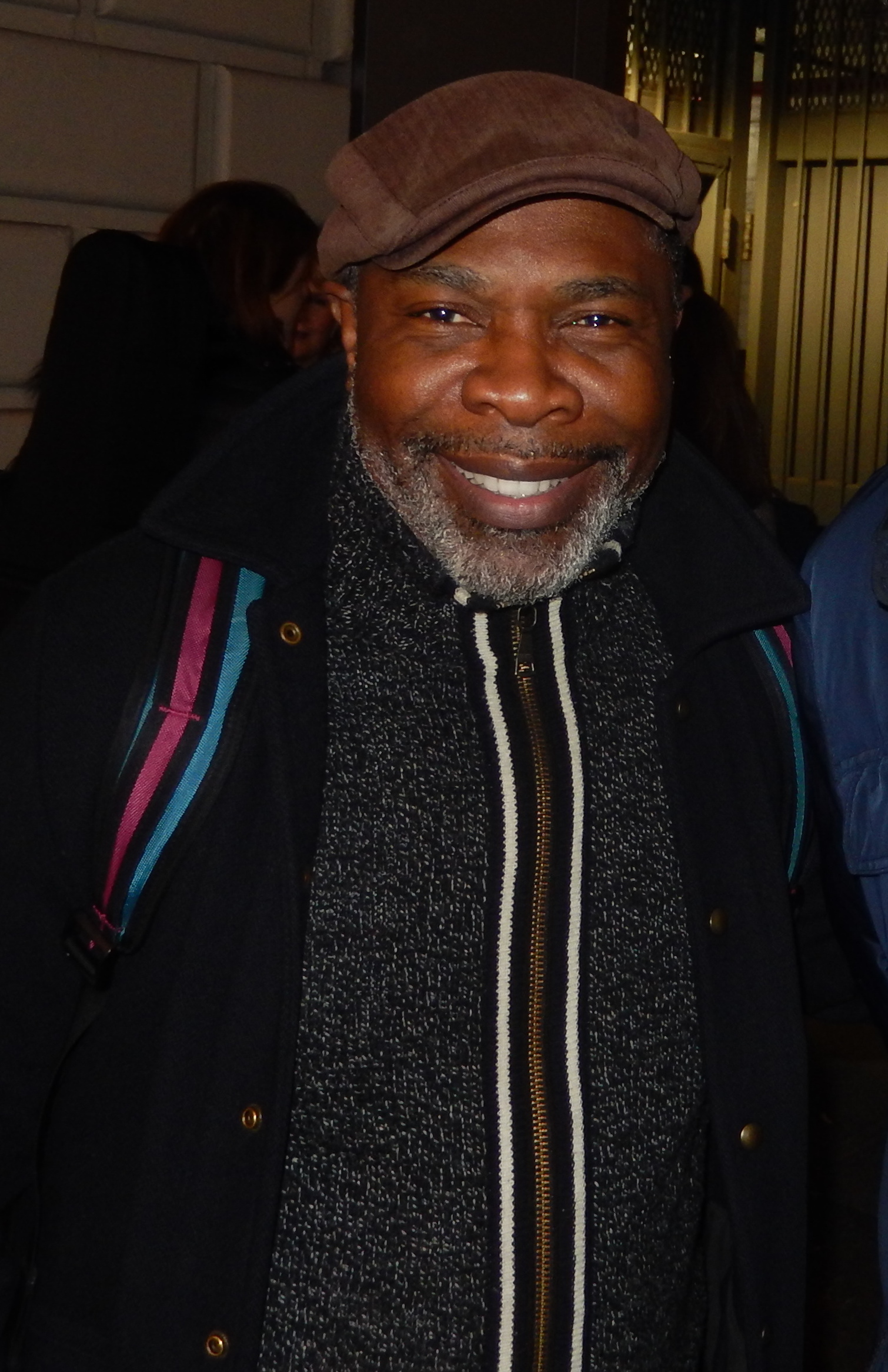
- Michael Potts
  Sid Bunderslaw (portrayed by Michael Potts) – The Director of Physical Operations at Wayne Enterprises who is a conspirator with Molly Mathis. He and Mathis hired Reggie Payne to break into Wayne Manor and find out how much Bruce Wayne knows about their criminal activity. Sid Bunderslaw is later abducted by Oswald Cobblepot on Theo Galavan's behalf where Tabitha rips out one of his eyes so that it can be used for the Pike Brothers' heist on a building owned by Wayne Enterprises.
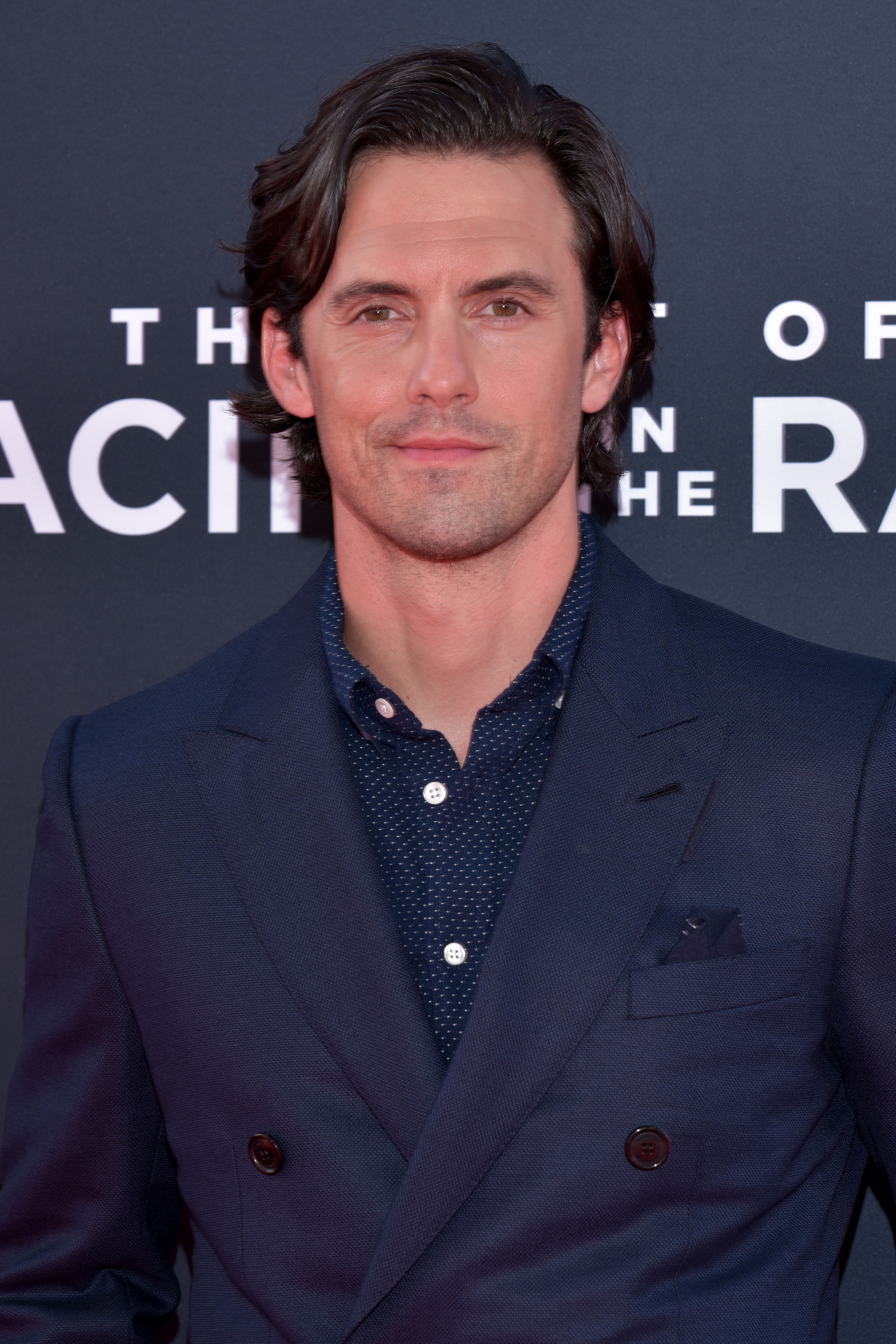
- Milo Ventimiglia
  Jason Lennon / The Ogre (portrayed by Milo Ventimiglia) – A young, wealthy and seductive serial killer known as Jason Lennon lures women and subjects them to "tests" as he searches for the perfect mate. He then murders the women once they fail to meet his impossible standards. His birth name is Jason Skolimski where he is the son of Jacob Skolimski. Despite having killed at least a dozen women, no one on the GCPD pursued him after he murdered the wife of one detective and threatened to do the same to the loved one(s) of any policeman who attempted to catch him. After James Gordon pursued him, Lennon sought out Barbara Kean to kill her but was unable to do so after he became obsessed with her and came to believe she was the "perfect mate" for whom he had been ostensibly searching. After being tracked down, Jason is shot dead by James Gordon. However, his insanity lives on in the traumatized Barbara whom he forced to murder her own parents.
- Ben Mueller (portrayed by Laurence Mason) – A police detective that once investigated the Ogre.
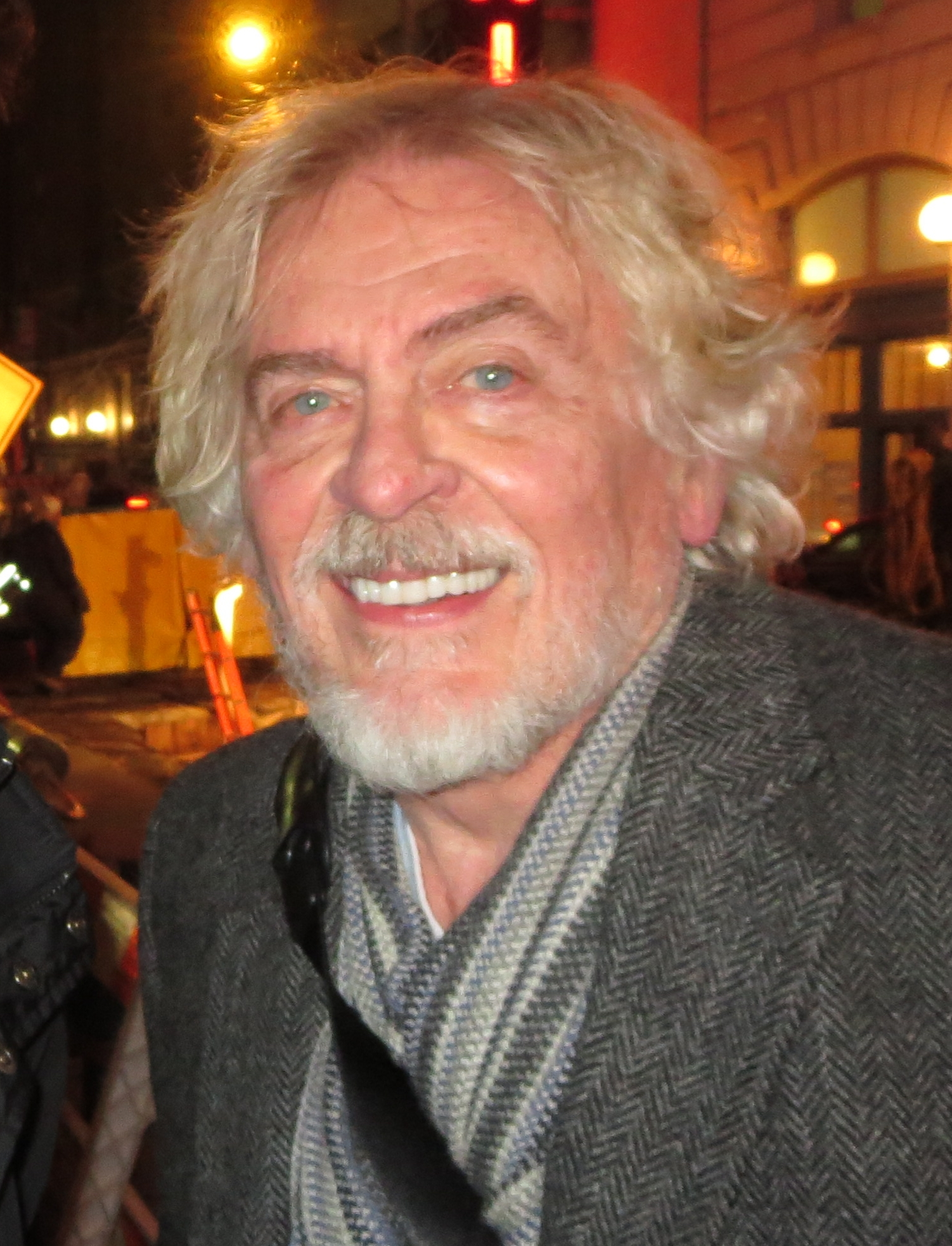
- Daniel Davis
  Jacob Skolimski (portrayed by Daniel Davis) – A butler for Constance van Groot who is the father of Jason. After Jason killed Constance for not making her his official son, Jacob attempted to commit suicide by hanging only to be stopped by James Gordon and Harvey Bullock. Jacob cooperated with the Gordon and Bullock and told them about Jason's past.

=== Introduced in season 2 ===
- Zaardon the Soul Reaper (portrayed by David Fierro) – A mentally ill amateur supervillain who was placed in Arkham Asylum after assaulting innocent civilians and being defeated by James Gordon. He was actually used by his employer Theo Galavan as part of the Arkham Asylum breakout where his body expired upon emitting liquid knock-out gas from his mouth that knocked out everyone else in the room.
- Franks (portrayed by Michael Barra) – A member of the Gotham City Police Department. He once showed up late to stop Zaardon. Franks is later among the police officers that were temporarily mind-controlled by Ivy Pepper.
- Robert Greenwood (portrayed by Dustin Ybarra) – A homicidal cannibal incarcerated in Arkham Asylum under the charges of murdering and eating over a dozen women. He along with several other inmates escaped the asylum with the aid of Tabitha Galavan to form Theo Galavan's Maniax. During the ambush on the Gotham City Police Department, Greenwood was killed by Jerome Valeska after he said something that Jerome wanted to say.
- Aaron Helzinger (portrayed by Stink Fisher) – A villainous muscular aggressive man with limited brain function who was incarcerated at Arkham Asylum for murdering his family with his bare hands until he escaped the asylum with the help of Tabitha Galavan to form Theo Galavan's Maniax. While the other Maniax were attacking the Gotham City Police Department, Aaron accompanied Barbara Kean into ambushing Gordon where he managed to beat him up. At some point following Theo Galavan's death, Aaron was recaptured and re-incarcerated at Arkham Asylum. When Hugo Strange puts Oswald Cobblepot through the "ice cream" therapy in Arkham Asylum's cafeteria, Aaron attacked Oswald out of anger that nobody was offered any ice cream. Upon not seeing Oswald back, Hugo sent the guards to break up the attack. Oswald was later thrown in the same room with a chained-up Aaron so that Hugo can see if Oswald would kill him. Hugo sees that he did not kill Aaron and declares that Oswald is sane. Aaron is later brought to Theo Galavan by Hugo Strange as Theo hits him with the chest containing the recently forged Sword of Sin.
- Arnold Dobkins (portrayed by Will Brill) – A rapist who was incarcerated at Arkham Asylum. He was one of the many inmates to have been broken out of the asylum by Tabitha Galavan to form Theo Galavan's Maniax. During a massacre attempt on a bus filled with cheerleaders from Gotham City High School, Dobkins was subdued by Gordon and sniped by Tabitha to keep him from telling the Gotham City Police Department about Theo's involvement.
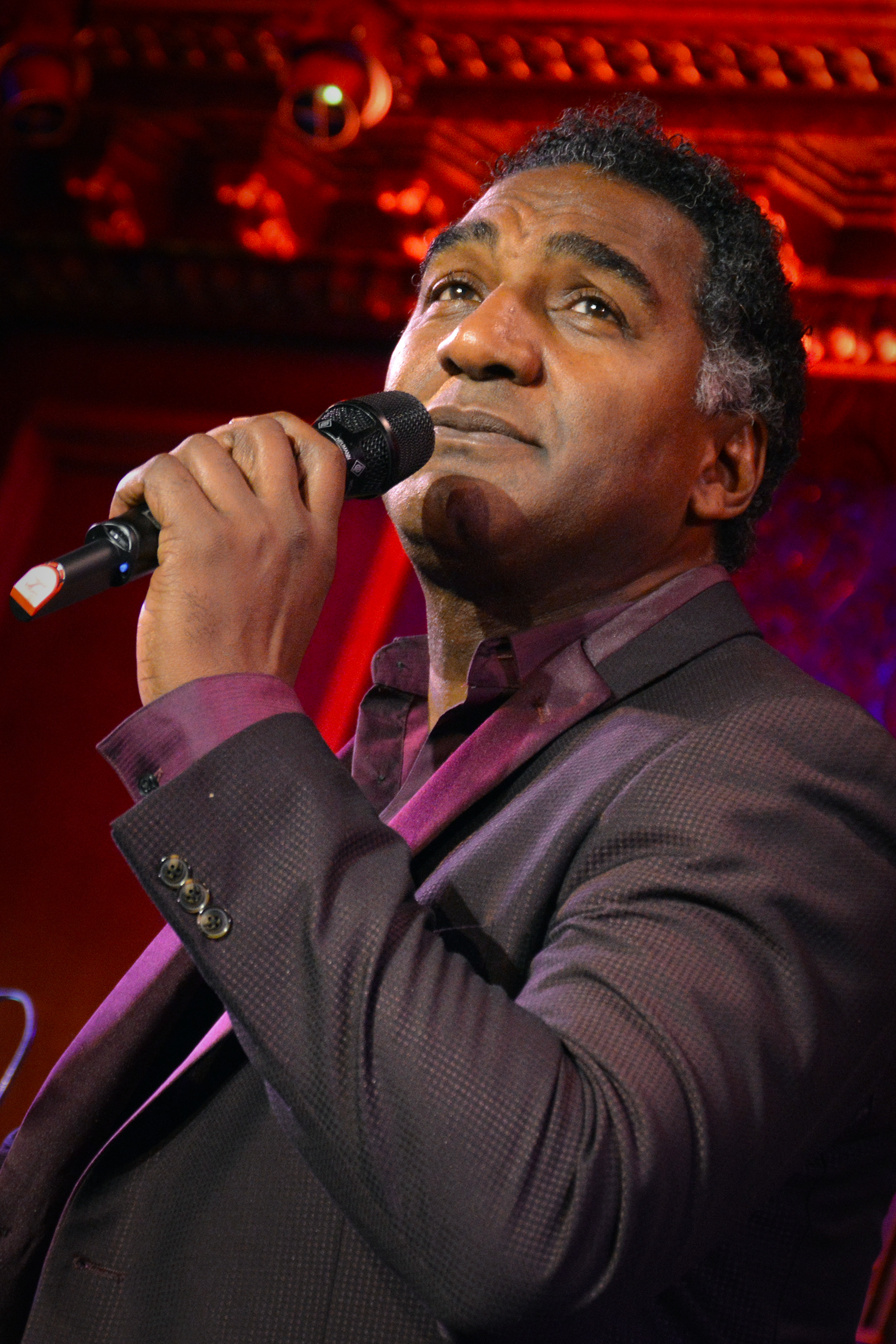
- Norm Lewis
  Harrison Kane (portrayed by Norm Lewis) – The deputy mayor of Gotham City under Mayor Aubrey James. During a fundraiser event at Gotham Children's Hospital, Harrison Kane was killed onstage by Jerome Valeska disguised as a magician at the start of the hostage crisis.
- Gus Freeman (portrayed by Danny Johnson) – An instructor at Gotham Police Academy who previously had James Gordon as a cadet. Gus was approached by Gordon and Nathaniel Barnes who were looking for promising cadets. He was later present when Barnes swore the graduates in as members of the GCPD Strike Force.
- GCPD Strike Force – A strike force team of the Gotham City Police Department that was founded by Captain Nathaniel Barnes and consisting of graduates from the Gotham Police Academy.
  - Josie Mac (portrayed by Paulina Singer) – One of the several young police trainees to join Captain Nathaniel Barnes' strike force. While protecting mayoral candidate Randall Hobbs, Josie was shot by Victor Zsasz where the bullet hit her bulletproof vest enough to stun her. She is the only surviving member of the GCPD Strike Force.
  - Luke Garrett (portrayed by Lenny Platt) – One of the several young police trainees to join Captain Nathaniel Barnes' strike force. He gets burned by Firefly during her fight with Gordon and Bullock where he later died in the hospital.
  - Sal Martinez (portrayed by Lucas Salvagno) – One of the several young police trainees to join Captain Nathaniel Barnes' strike force. He is later killed by Tabitha Galavan when he tried to arrest her during the fight between Oswald Cobblepot's gang and the Gotham City Police Department.
  - Carl Pinkney (portrayed by Ian Quinlan) – One of the several young police trainees to join Captain Nathaniel Barnes' strike force. He is killed by Edward Nygma using a crowbar on him to frame Gordon for the murder.
- Pike Brothers – The Pike Brothers are a group of arsonists that were loyal to Fish Mooney. They are nicknamed the "Firebugs of the Narrows" and their force their stepsister Bridgit to do their dirty work in exchange for a roof over her head.
  - Joe Pike (portrayed by Leo Fitzpatrick) – The leader of the Pike Brothers and the abusive stepbrother of Bridgit Pike. He is later burned to death by Firefly where he dies by the time Gordon and Bullock arrive.
  - Cale Pike (portrayed by Ari McKay Wilford) – Member of the Pike Brothers and the abusive stepbrother of Bridgit Pike. He is later burned to death by Firefly.
  - Evan Pike (portrayed by Noah Robbins) – Member of the Pike Brothers and the abusive stepbrother of Bridget Pike. While buying napalm at the Merc for the Pike Brothers' latest heist, Evan was cornered by James Gordon and Nathaniel Barnes where their shooting of him set off the napalm that he was going to smuggle out resulting in Evan's body getting blown up. Evan's death caused Joe and Cale to drag Bridgit into their heist.
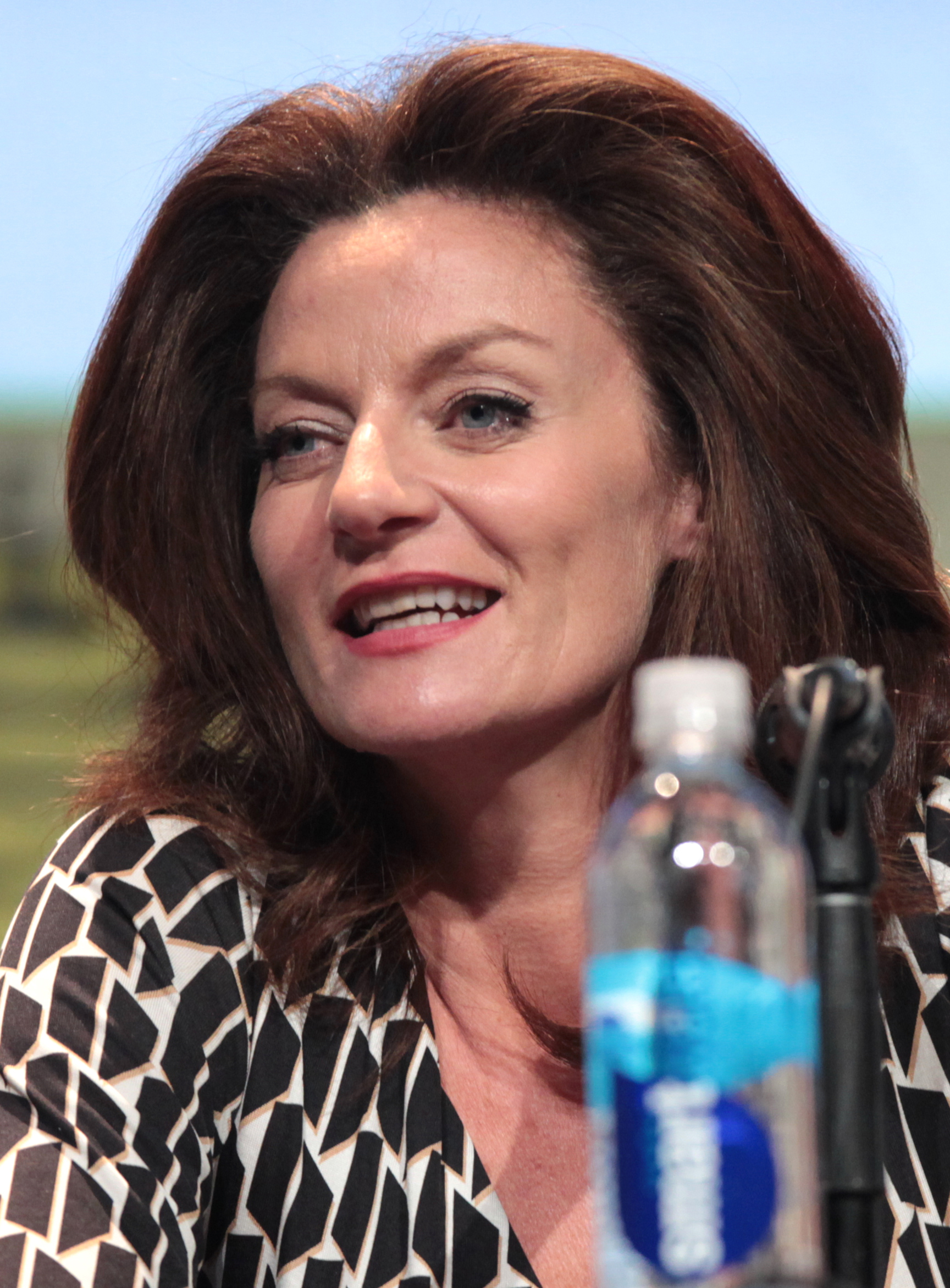
- Michelle Gomez
  The Lady (portrayed by Michelle Gomez) – The unnamed leader of an organization of assassins with a bar serving as a front for their secret hideout. Tabitha Galavan once enlisted her to have her assassins kill Jim Gordon. After most of her clients were killed by Jim Gordon and Nathaniel Barnes, The Lady had gone out of business. Barbara later helps Jim get info from The Lady that it was "The Philosopher" that contracted the hit on Thomas Wayne and Martha Wayne.
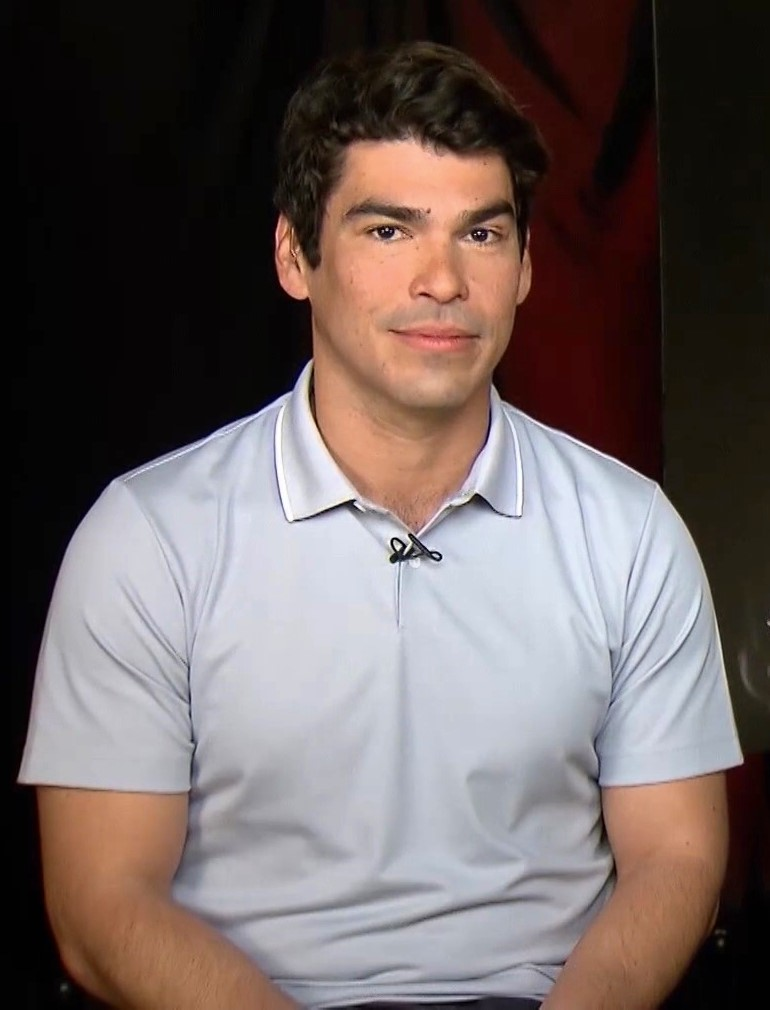
- Raúl Castillo
  Eduardo Flamingo (portrayed by Raúl Castillo) – One of Gotham City's most dangerous assassins, the Flamingo is a spiked-chain wielding cannibal who sees killing as an artform. He is hired by "The Lady" on Tabitha's behalf to kill Gordon, but fails and is arrested. Despite the efforts of the nearby police officers at the Gotham City Police Department, Eduardo kills Officer Katherine Parks by biting into her before he is put behind bars.
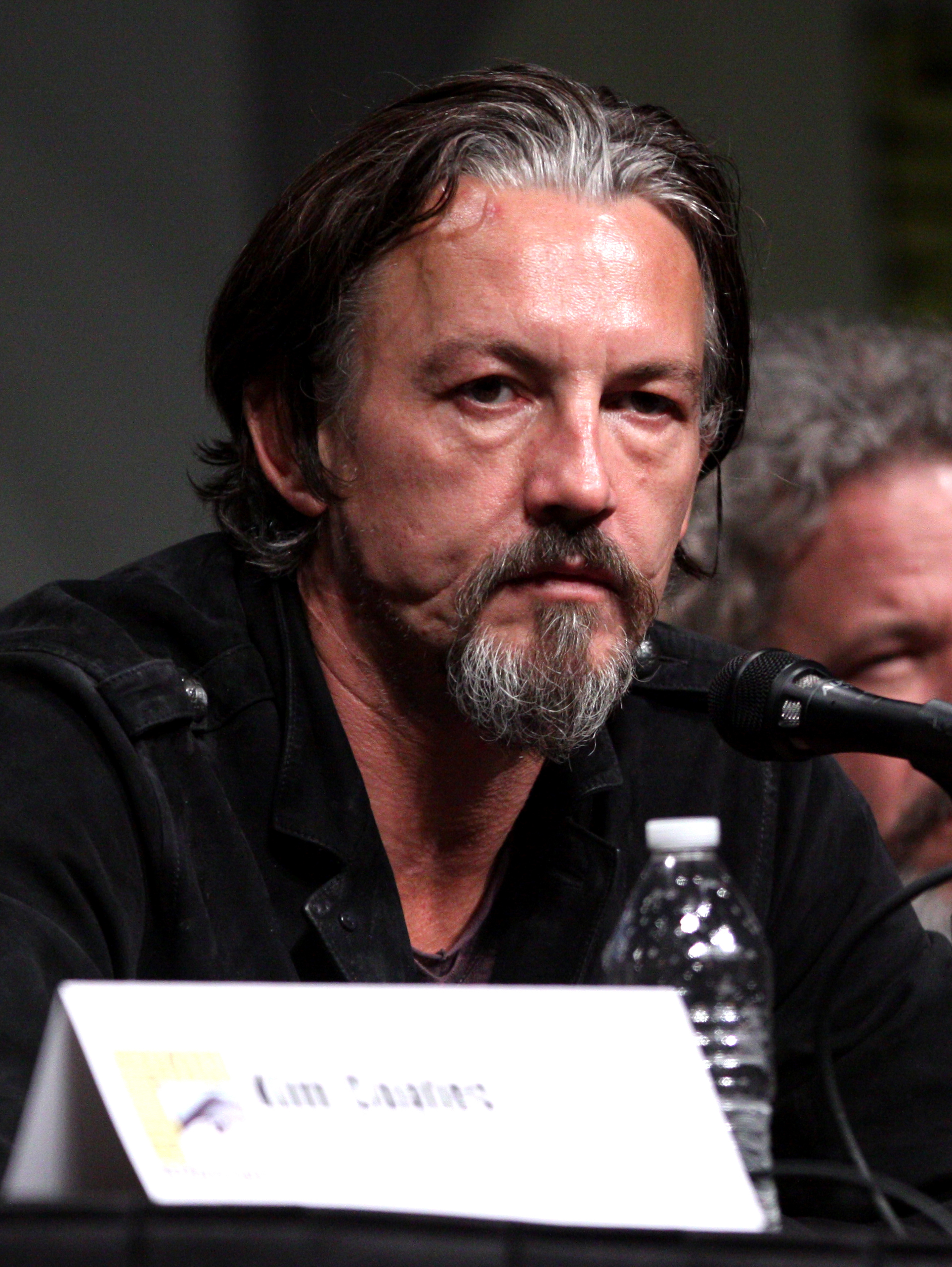
- Tommy Flanagan
  Tom "The Knife" (portrayed by Tommy Flanagan) – A dangerous hitman who uses a humorous stylish facade to cover up his murderous tendencies. He and his men were secretly hired by Bruce Wayne and Selina Kyle to extract the name of the man who killed Thomas and Martha Wayne by pretending to kidnap Bruce and abducting Silver St. Cloud and "interrogating" them separately. The pressure leads Silver to reveal the name "M. Malone" as the killer of Thomas and Martha Wayne.
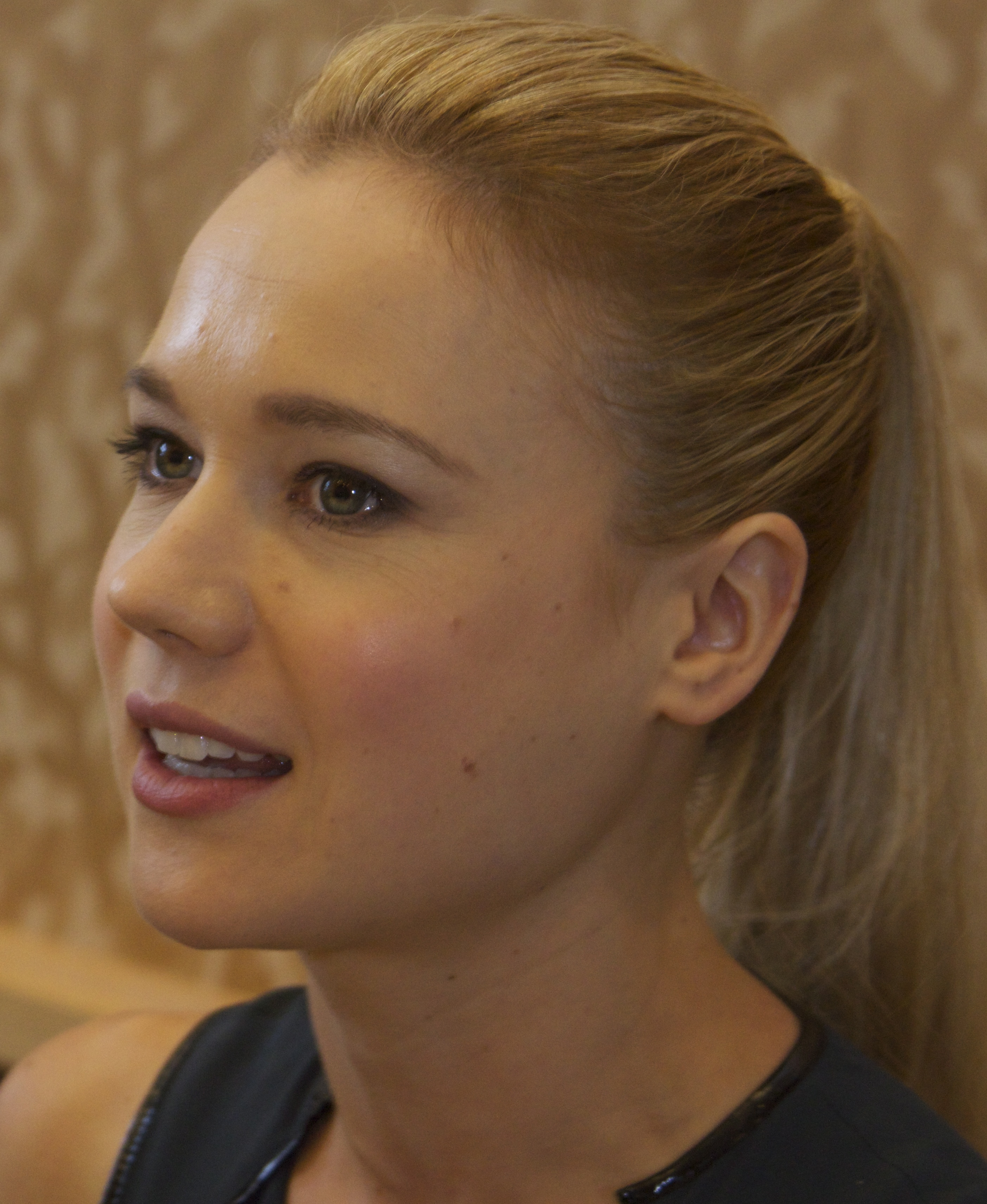
- Kristen Hager
  Nora Fries (portrayed by Kristen Hager) – The wife of Victor Fries who is stricken with a worsening illness. When the police trace the pharmaceutical order for Nora Fries' prescription, the police take Nora into their custody moments after she found the frozen humans Victor has been experimenting with. She told Gordon and Bullock that Victor did the abductions in order to keep her from dying. Before Victor tried to freeze her, Nora committed suicide by switching the cryogenic chemicals with an earlier batch that failed.
- Terence "Cupcake" Shaw (portrayed by Jamar Greene) – The former partner of Patrick "Matches" Malone until he was incarcerated upon Patrick ratting him out. After spending 10 years in prison, he became the leader of the Mutants gang and established a fight area where Alfred had to fight him in order to get an idea on how to find Patrick. After being defeated by Alfred, Terence tells Alfred to speak with Jeri.
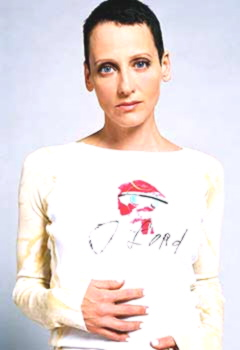
- Lori Petty
  Jeri (portrayed by Lori Petty) – The flamboyant and enigmatic hostess of an underground club where mass murder and art are celebrated in equal measure. She has been an acquaintance with Patrick "Matches" Malone and Terrence "Cupcake" Shaw. Jeri tells Bruce where he can find Patrick and then provides a diversion to keep James Gordon from interfering. This gets her arrested when the police arrive where she is forced to tell where Bruce went to.
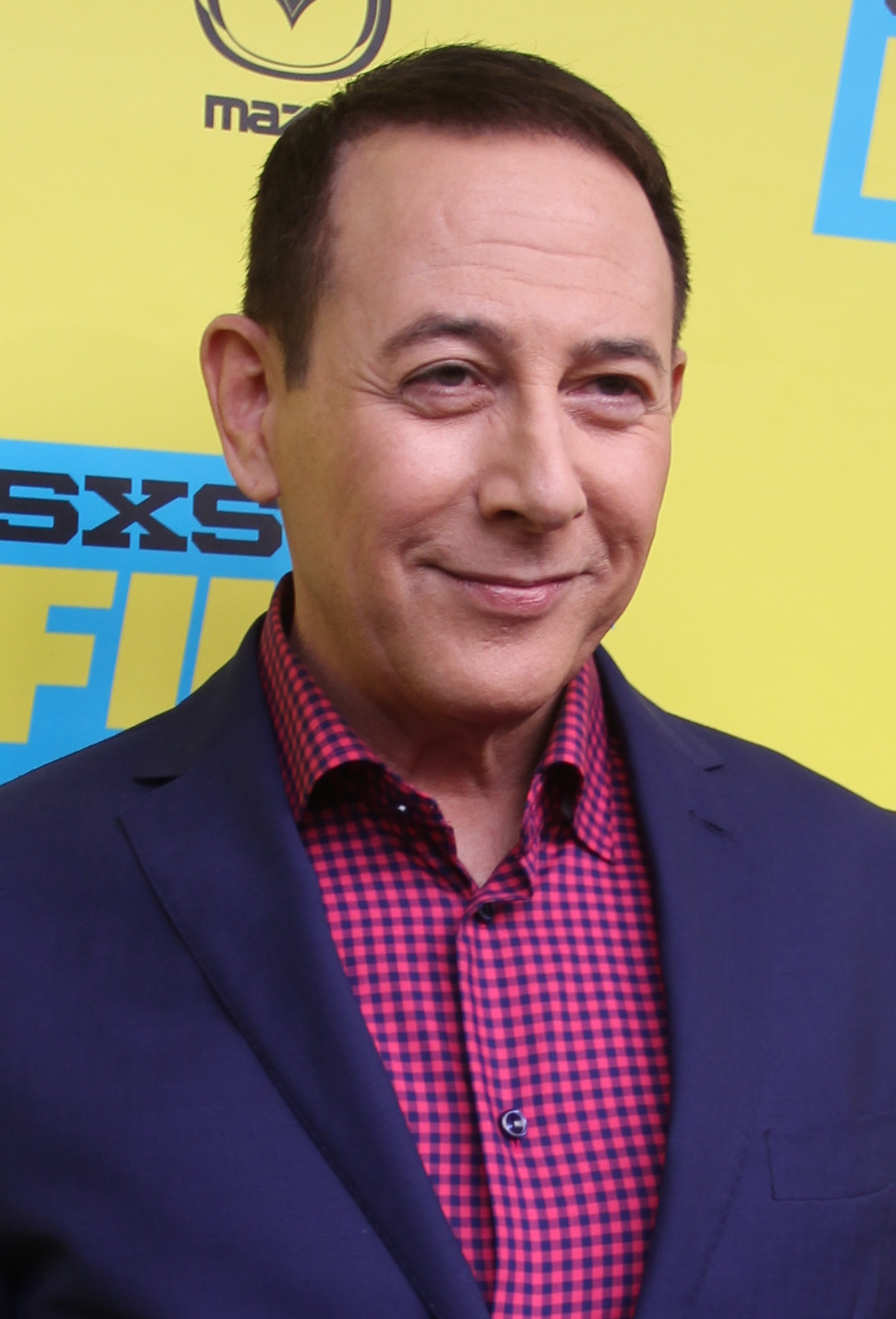
- Paul Reubens
  Elijah Van Dahl (portrayed by Paul Reubens) – The father of Oswald Cobblepot, the ex-lover of Gertrud Kapelpot, the husband of Grace Van Dahl, and the stepfather of Charles Van Dahl and Sasha Van Dahl. When Gertrud used to work as a cook for Elijah's parents, he and Gertrud fell in love in secret. Elijah first met Oswald where he was visiting Gertrud's grave. He then took Oswald to his house where he meets his stepmother and stepsiblings as Elijah does a toast to their family. While having dinner with his family, Elijah told Oswald that he is his only blood relative. He later tells Oswald that he has a hole medical condition and is not interested in what bad transgressions Oswald has been through despite the claims of Grace, Charles, and Sasha. Elijah later dies from poisoned wine that Grace, Charles, and Sasha poisoned, intending to poison Oswald. His death is later avenged by Oswald. Riddler later hired Basil Karlo to masquerade as part of a plot to break Oswald's sanity. It should also be noted that Paul Reubens also portrayed "Tucker Cobblepot" who also was the biological father of Penguin in the comics and the 1992 film Batman Returns.
- Sonny Gilzean (portrayed by Paul Pilcz) – The nephew of Butch Gilzean. After he caught Bruce and Selina trying to steal from him, Sonny violently beat Bruce. In retaliation, Bruce subjected Sonny to a worse beating before escaping with Selina. Bruce later fought Sonny and his friends again where they were attacking Selina. This time, Bruce fights them off.
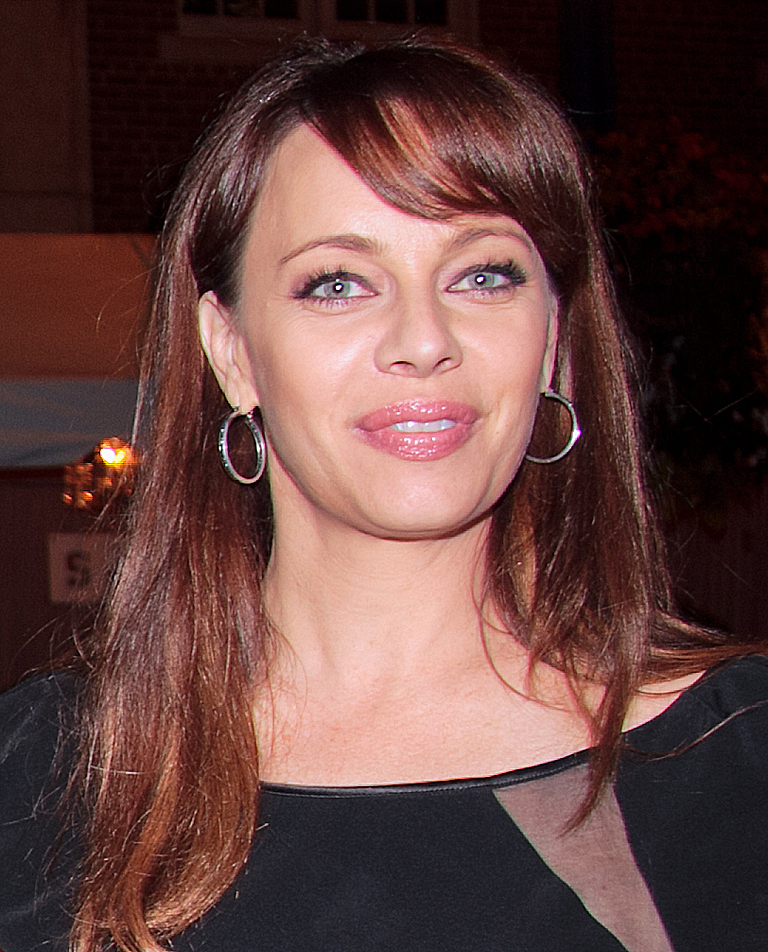
- Melinda Clarke
  Grace Van Dahl (portrayed by Melinda Clarke) – Superficially, a cultured hostess and socialite who is married to Elijah Van Dahl, the mother of Charles Van Dahl and Sasha Van Dahl, and the stepmother of Oswald Cobblepot. In reality, she is desperate for money and power where she comes up with devious plots to get them. Grace was a former diner waitress who first met Elijah at the diner and gave her refuge. She had secretly been switching his heart medicine with breath mints, to inherit his money. Following Elijah's death, Grace allowed Oswald to remain with her as a servant. Upon figuring out that Grace had a hand in his father's untimely death, Oswald takes his revenge on Grace by killing her after tricking her into eating a roast he made from her dead children. Her head is later used as a centerpiece of the Van Dahl household.
- Charles Van Dahl (portrayed by Justin Mark) – The son of Grace Van Dahl, the brother of Sasha Van Dahl, the stepson of Elijah Van Dahl and the stepbrother of Oswald Cobblepot. Charles appears to have a good heart (even once complimenting Oswald's cooking), but is easily pressured by his mother into doing her bidding. He is later killed by Oswald offscreen and cooked into a roast.
- Sasha Van Dahl (portrayed by Kaley Ronayne) – The daughter of Grace Van Dahl, sister of Charles Van Dahl, stepdaughter of Elijah Van Dahl and the stepsister of Oswald Cobblepot. She is later killed by Oswald offscreen and cooked into a roast.
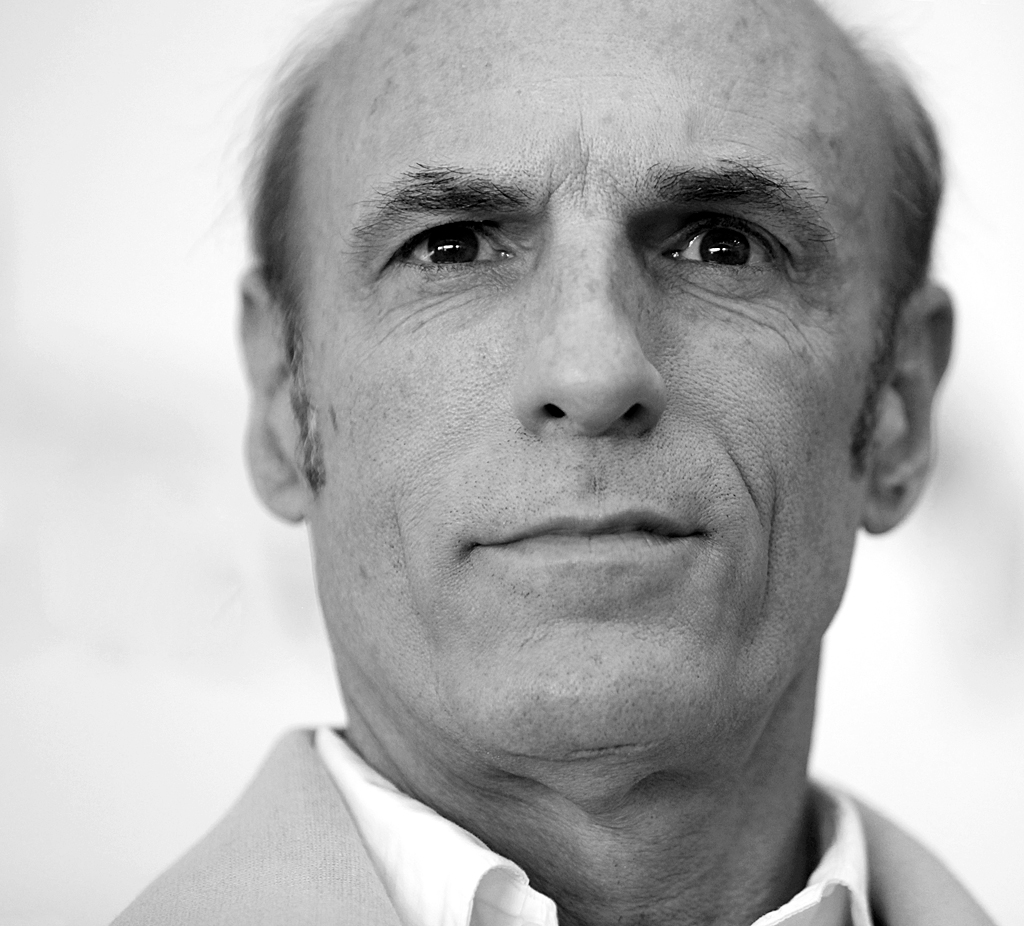
- Ned Bellamy
  Carlson Grey (portrayed by Ned Bellamy) – The corrupt prison warden of Blackgate Penitentiary who is good friends with Gillian Loeb.
- Wilson Bishop (portrayed by Marc Damon Johnson) – A prison guard that James Gordon befriended during his time a Blackgate Penitentiary.
- Peter "Puck" Davies (portrayed by Peter Park Kendall) – A young man incarcerated at Blackgate Penitentiary. After Puck tries to defend Gordon from other inmates, he gets beaten in return. He later reveals that his younger sister was rescued by Gordon from Dollmaker's minions and that he was sent to prison after trying to steal a car to meet his girlfriend. Looking at Gordon as a hero, Gordon later comes to break Puck out of prison. After that was done, Puck later dies peacefully from his injuries.
- Scale Skin Man (portrayed by Radu Spinghel) – An unidentified man with scaly skin who is one of Indian Hill's experiments. After escaping from the Indian Hill bus with the other experiments, the Scale Skin Man joined up with Fish Mooney's gang.
- Basil Karlo (portrayed by Brian McManamon) – A deceased actor who was revived by Hugo Strange and Ethel Peabody at the Indian Hill facility. Thanks to the octopus DNA, he can now stretch his face. Hugo Strange used him to pose as Jim Gordon until his ruse was exposed by Barbara Kean. Basil spoke poorly about Lee, which Jim would never do, prompting a slap to his face that revealed its stretching abilities. Basil later appeared to help Edward Nygma in his plot to break Oswald Cobblepot's sanity.

=== Introduced in season 3 ===
- Marino / Ridgeback Monster (portrayed by Michael Montgomery) – A humanoid with ridge-like bony plates on his head and back that is one of the experiments that escaped from the Indian Hill bus. During his fight with James Gordon, the Ridgeback Monster was struck down by an approaching truck. Nathaniel Barnes stated that his men are still "picking up the pieces" of the monster. His real name was revealed in the second tie-in novel Gotham: City of Monsters.
- Marv (portrayed by Victor Pagan) – A male who is one of the Indian Hill experiments that escaped from the Indian Hill bus and joined up with Fish Mooney's gang. His touch is described to be a reverse effect of the Fountain of Youth where anyone he touches turns old and dies. Marv was responsible for killing Ethel Peabody and briefly touched Ivy Pepper enough to age her to a teenager. During Oswald Cobblepot's confrontation with Fish Mooney at the place where Hugo Strange was incarcerated, Cobblepot told Marv to take his leave from the area.
- Nancy (portrayed by Bianca Rutigliano) – A mouth mask-wearing female who is one of the Indian Hill experiments that escaped from the Indian Hill bus. She later appeared as a member of Fish Mooney's gang. Nancy is later killed by an angry mob amassed by Penguin with her body later being burned in the bonfire.
- Sid (portrayed by Michael Lorz) – A white-haired male with super-speed who is one of the Indian Hill experiments that escaped from the Indian Hill bus and joined up with Fish Mooney's gang. Sid is later killed by an angry mob amassed by Penguin with his body later being burned in the bonfire.
- Alice Tetch (portrayed by Naian Gonzalez Norvind) – Jervis Tetch's sister who has a virus in her blood stream due to being experimented on by Professor Strange. She was freed from Strange's laboratory at Indian Hill and briefly resided with Fish Mooney before the two went their separate ways. Jervis hired Gordon to find Alice. When Jervis attempted to hypnotise Gordon into suicide by walking off the roof of The Sirens, Alice intervened where she did not want to go with Jervis enough to try to shoot him. While Jervis escapes, Alice is handcuffed by Gordon. After being abducted by Jervis and the Deevers, Alice's blood is harvested by Jervis. During Gordon and Bullock's fight with Jervis and the remaining two Deevers, Alice tries to escape from her brother and accidentally falls on a pipe, impaling her. Though one of her blood samples on the pipe fell onto Nathaniel Barnes. Jervis later stole Alice's body from the morgue and harvested her blood where he planned to use it alongside the Red Queen plant to put in the drinks at the Gotham City Founders' Dinner.
- The Terrible Tweeds – A group of five wrestlers that were hypnotized into doing Jervis Tetch's bidding. While Dumfree and Deever helped Jervis to abduct Alice from police custody, two unnamed members were killed during the fight with the police while the third one was apprehended.
  - Dumfree Tweed (portrayed by Adam Petchel) – A member of the Terrible Tweeds and the brother of Deever Tweed. After being hypnotized, he and Deever helped Jervis to take off Alice Tetch out of the GCPD. Following Alice's suicide, Dumfree and Deever escape with Jervis after the police arrive. After an attempt to hijack the Gotham City Founders' Dinner, Dumfree, Deever, and Jervis are arrested by the GCPD and are remanded to Arkham Asylum.
  - Deever Tweed (portrayed by Happy Anderson) – A member of the Terrible Tweeds and the brother of Dumfree Tweed. After being hypnotized, he and Dumfree helped Jervis to take off Alice Tetch out of the GCPD. Following Alice's suicide, Deever and Dumfree escape with Jervis after the police arrive. After an attempt to hijack the Gotham City Founders' Dinner, Deever, Dumfree, and Jervis are arrested by the GCPD and are remanded to Arkham Asylum.
- Isabella (portrayed by Chelsea Spack) – A woman who resembles Kristen Kringle. After Oswald Cobblepot tries to confess his love for Edward Nygma, he thinks it will be better said over dinner. However, while Edward is picking out wine for the dinner, he meets Isabella and is dumbstruck by how much she looks like his ex-girlfriend Kristen Kringle, whom he murdered. The next day, it is revealed the two had a connection for each other and Edward invites her for dinner at the Mayor's mansion. However, when Oswald finds out that Edward met Isabella he tries to split them up by revealing to Isabella at her job, that Edward went to Arkham which scares Isabella. Later, during the date when Edward tries to reveal to Isabella that he killed Kringle, Isabella confesses she already knew. Isabella says she has been waiting for a man like Edward to come into her life and the two kiss just as Oswald walks in. Later, when Edward makes her breakfast Isabella reveals she is going to a librarians convention, and while reading Edward her schedule she puts on her glasses which scare Edward because of how much they look like Kringle's. While in Isabella's bathroom Edward sees a hallucination of Kringle telling him that he will hurt Isabella just like he hurt her. Edward becomes scared of what he will do to Isabella and has Oswald break up with her for him. Oswald tells Isabella not to see Edward again, which shocks Isabella. Isabella soon finds out that Edward does not want to see her because he's scared he hurt her like he did Kringle, and that Oswald loves Edward. After Isabella tells Oswald she is not leaving Edward, Oswald leaves angrily telling her he warned her. Later, when Edward comes to see Isabella a final time he finds her dressed as Kristen Kringle. Isabella then has Edward put his hands on her neck, and the two then kiss. Finally, when Edward returns to Oswald he reveals that things are going to be just fine with Isabella. Once Edward leaves Oswald reveals he had one of his goons cut her brakes. Meanwhile across town Isabella starts heading right for a train, but cannot stop because her brakes do not work, and crashes right into the train killing her. Edward is crushed by Isabella's death and finds out that her brakes were cut. After finding out that it was Oswald, Edward tries to get his revenge on him multiple times.
- Campos (portrayed by Flora Diaz) – A police detective.
- McGregor (portrayed by an uncredited actor) – An archbishop in Gotham City who attended Mayor Oswald Cobblepot's banquet that was crashed by Jervis Tetch. When he is later among those who are taken captive by Jerome Valeska and his allies, Archbishop McGregor and Commissioner Reynolds are killed by the neck bombs on them to serve as examples when Jerome demands a ransom of Bruce Wayne and Jeremiah Valeska.
- Peter Gordon (portrayed by Michael Park) – The father of James Gordon and brother of Frank Gordon. He is a former district attorney who was killed in a car crash caused by a drunk driver who was actually hired by Frank Gordon in order to keep him from exposing the Court of Owls. Upon being exposed to the Red Queen plant by Jervis Tetch, Gordon went through the psychedelic trip which ended with him encountering his father. What Peter told his son was enough to get him to rejoin the Gotham City Police Department. Frank confirmed that Peter was a member of the Court of Owls before he saw through their lies and the car crash was orchestrated by them.
- Whisper Gang – A group of smugglers that are against the Court of Owls.
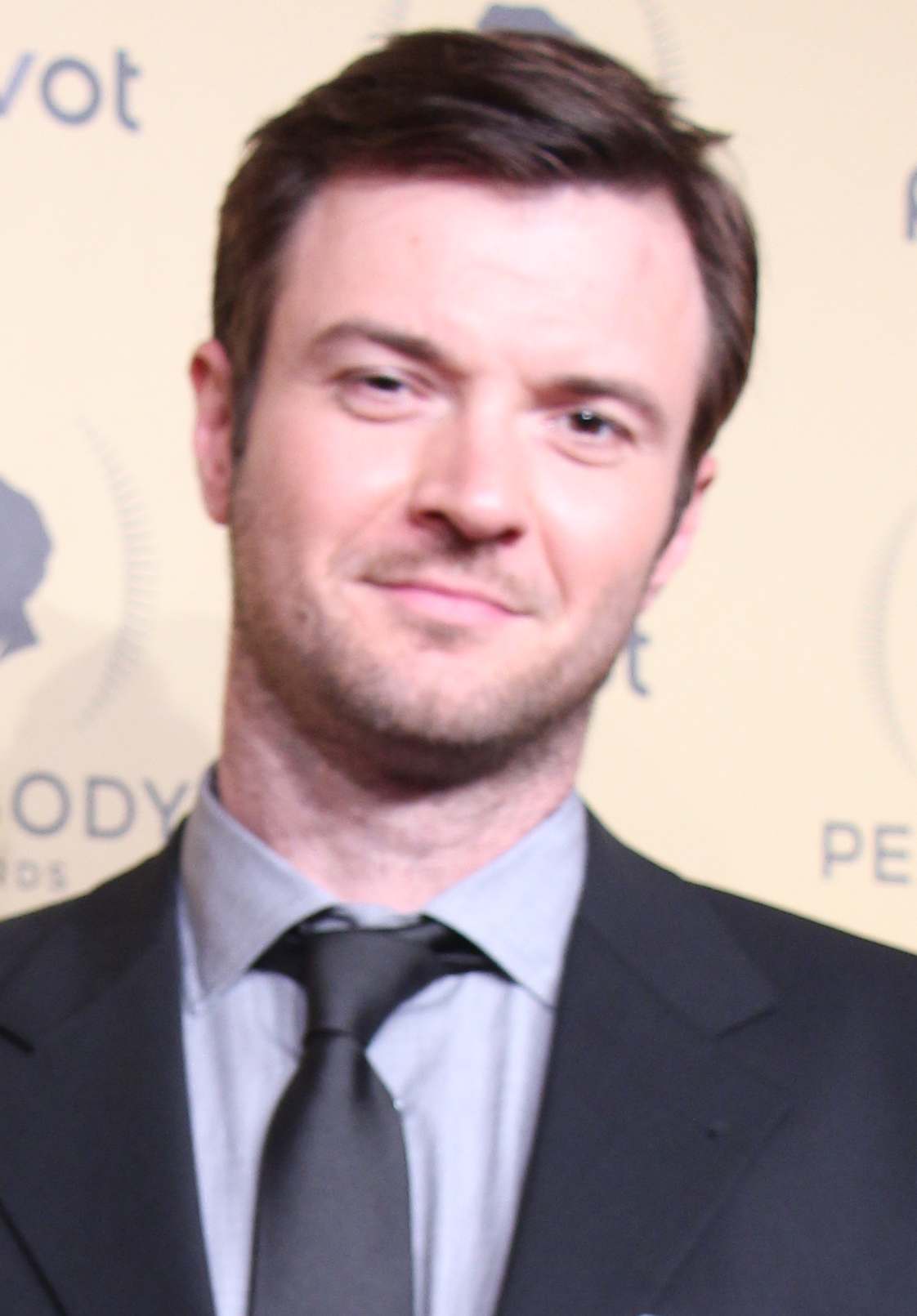
  - Costa Ronin
    Luka Volk (portrayed by Costa Ronin) – The leader of the Whisper Gang and brother of Jacob. He is subsequently killed by Talon.
  - Jacob Volk (portrayed by Julien Seredowych) – A member of the Whisper Gang and brother of Luka. He is subsequently killed by Talon.
- Maria Kyle (portrayed by Ivana Milicevic) – The estranged mother of Selina Kyle. She shows up in person following Bruce Wayne, Alfred Pennyworth, and Selina Kyle's fight with Talon, helping them overpower the assassin and escape with their lives. She apparently wants to reconnect with her daughter after having abandoned her eleven years ago, and is revealed to owe a debt of $200,000 to a criminal named Cole Clemons. She also strikes up a small friendship with Alfred, who appeared to have been attracted to her much in the same way Bruce is attracted to Selina. Bruce offers to pay Maria the money, but Maria is later revealed to have been in a con with Cole, plotting to use Selina's relationship with Bruce to get money without truly wanting to reconnect with her daughter at all. Confronting them at their hotel, and furious at being deceived and unwanted by her own mother, Selina tells her mother and Cole to never come back to Gotham.
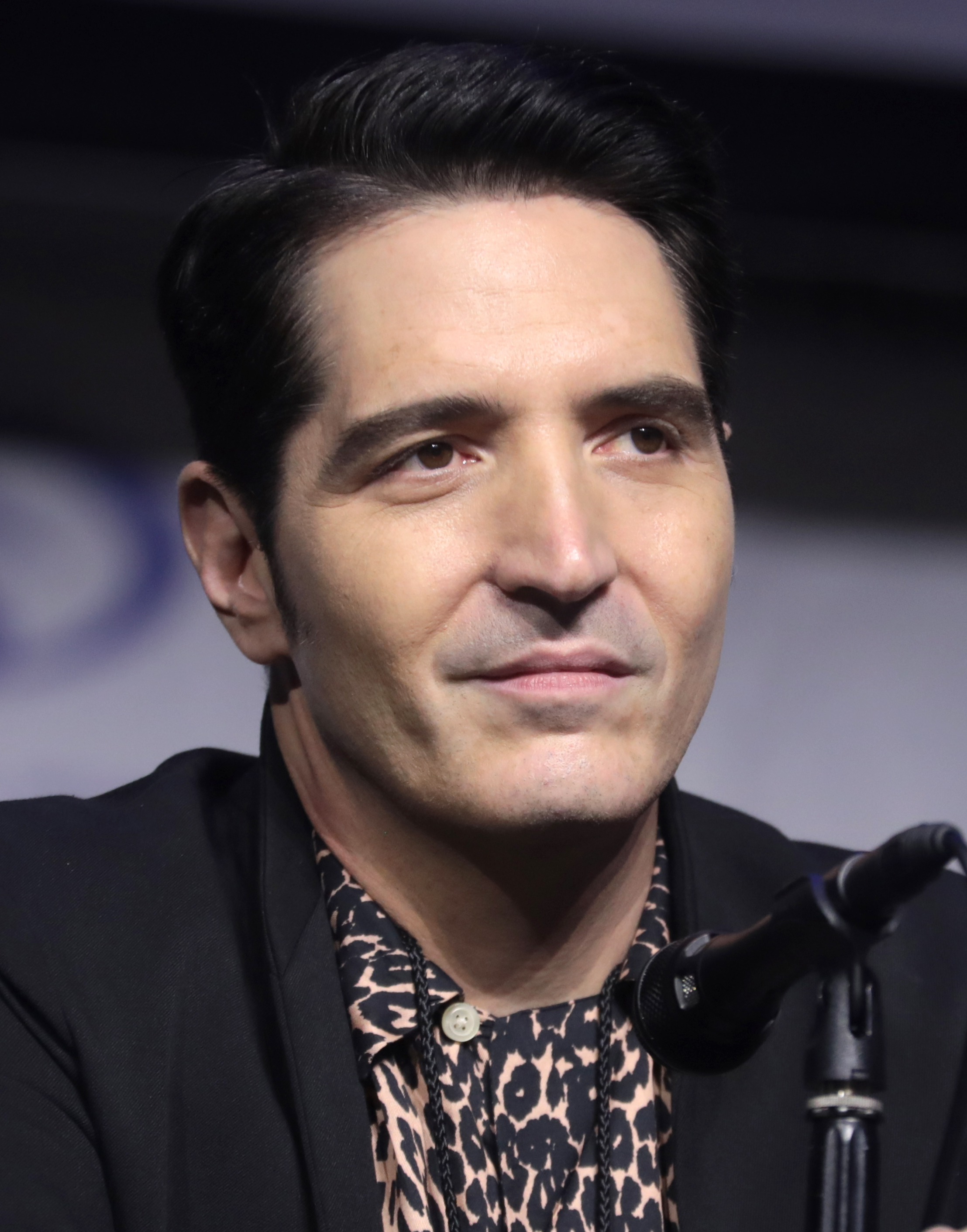
- David Dastmalchian
  Dwight Pollard (portrayed by David Dastmalchian) – A former Indian Hill scientist and morgue worker who experimented on dead corpses. He is revealed to have Jerome Valeska's corpse alongside the other corpses. Following what appeared to be a failed revival of Jerome, Dwight cuts off Jerome's face and poses as him to lead Jerome's followers into taking Channel 9 hostage. Despite being defeated by Gordon, Jerome makes off with him where he staples his face back on. After broadcasting to his followers using stolen Channel 9 equipment, Jerome uses explosives to kill Dwight which also blew up the power company enough to plunge Gotham City into a blackout.
- Gus (portrayed by Kaipo Schwab) – A former post office worker that helped Dwight Pollard in his experiments. Upon being tipped off about Gordon and the police coming by Dwight's mole Andrew Dove, Gus tells Dwight about this and suggests that they abandon the project only for Gus to be shocked by an electrical wire held by Dwight.
- Andrew Dove (portrayed by James Mount) – A police officer who is secretly a mole for Dwight Pollard.
- Cole Clemons (portrayed by P.J. Marshall) – A criminal that Maria Kyle is associated with.
- Armand (portrayed by Zoran Korach) – A thug who accompanied Gabriel in a plot to auction Penguin to whoever wants to kill him. Ivy Pepper used her perfume on him which led to Gabriel, Armand, and those with them getting killed by Penguin.

=== Introduced in season 4 ===
- Merton (portrayed by Michael Buscemi) – The co-leader of a gang that opposes Penguin and bribed Warden Reed into releasing Jonathan Crane into his gang's custody. During their planned attack on the Iceberg Lounge, Merton and those with him are defeated by Gordon, Bullock, Zsasz, Bruce, and Alfred.
- Grady Harris (portrayed by Michael Maize) – The co-leader of a gang alongside his cousin Merton that opposes Penguin and bribed Warden Reed into releasing Jonathan Crane into his gang's custody. After he gets away following the failed attack on the Iceberg Lounge, Grady returns to the hideout where Crane has become Scarecrow. The police later find his body set up like a scarecrow as he states that Scarecrow is coming.
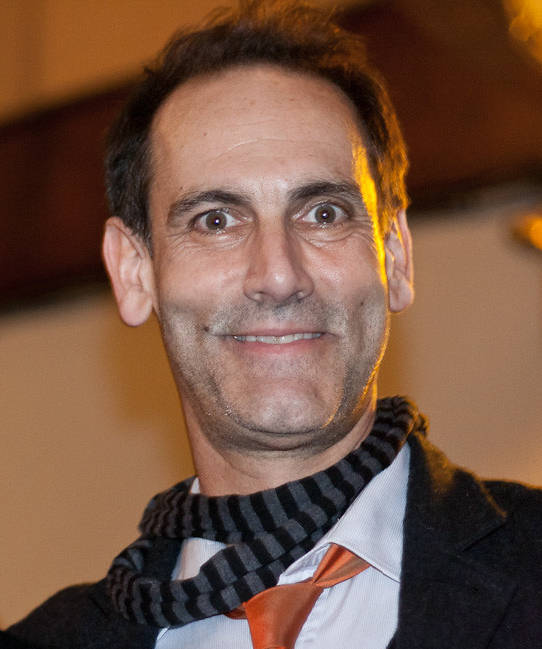
- Damian Young
  Reed (portrayed by Damian Young) – The abusive warden of Gotham Asylum who is bribed by Grady Harris and Merton in releasing Jonathan Crane into his custody. When Crane became Scarecrow, he returned to Gotham Asylum and exposed Reed to fear gas causing him to experience his fear of clowns.
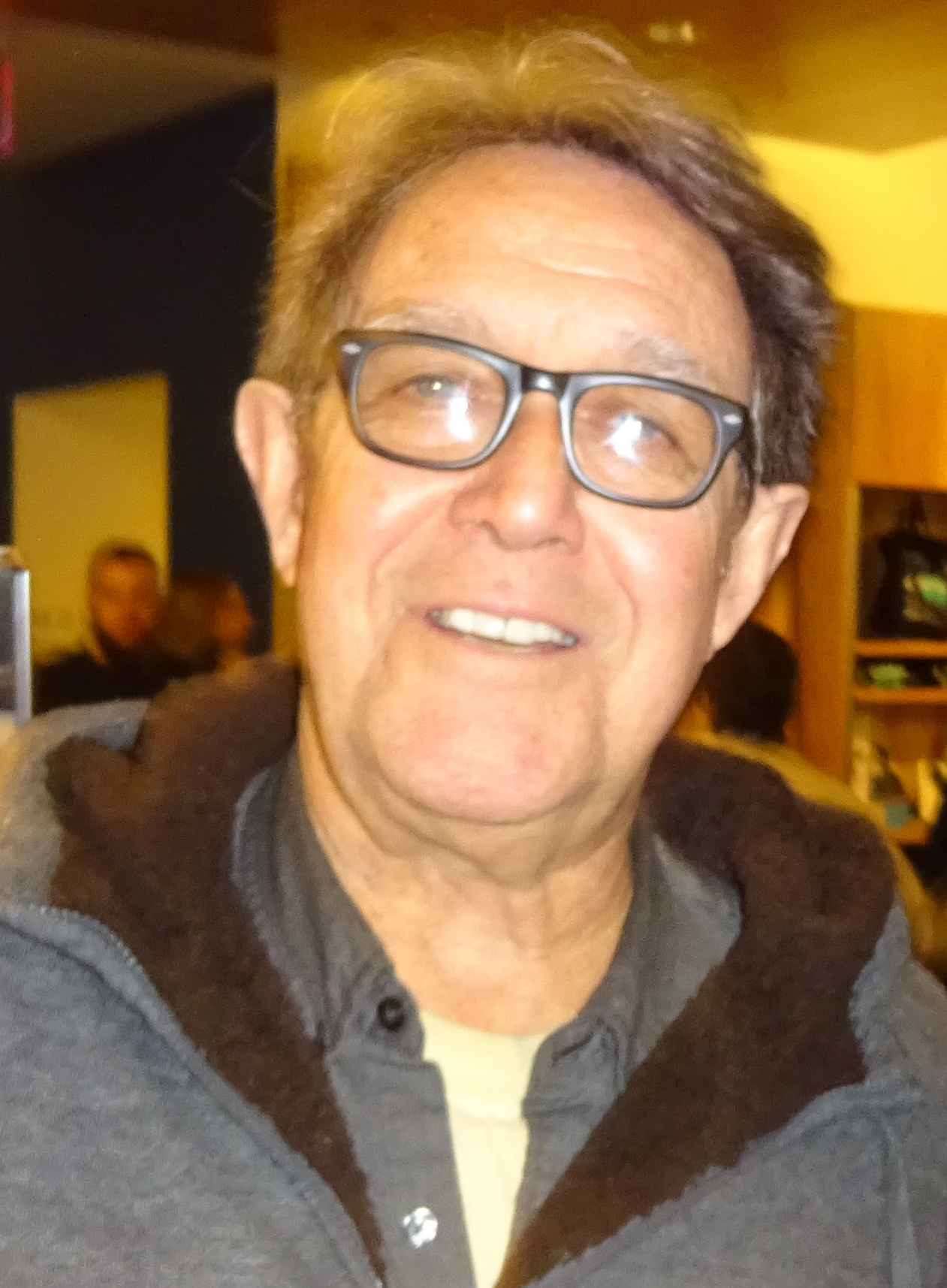
- Larry Pine
  Burke (portrayed by Larry Pine) – The Mayor of Gotham City who succeeds Aubrey James. He and the unnamed police commissioner had to agree with Oswald Cobblepot on the crime license pitch. After Jim Gordon saved some police officers and some of Cobblepot's men from Professor Pyg's trap, Mayor Burke promoted Gordon to police captain at Sofia Falcone's suggestion. During Gotham City's evacuation during Jeremiah Valeska's bomb threat upon his return, Mayor Burke, his secretary, and the unnamed commissioner that succeeded Reynolds noticed Ra's al Ghul outside Gotham City Hall as they are killed by one of Jeremiah Valeska's bombs.
- Reynolds (portrayed by Harry Sutton Jr.) – The police commissioner of the Gotham City Police Department. When he is among those who are taken captive by Jerome Valeska and his allies, Commissioner Reynolds and Archbishop McGregor are killed by the neck bombs on them to serve as examples when Jerome demands a ransom of Bruce Wayne and Jeremiah Valeska.
- Myrtle Jenkins (portrayed by Ilana Becker) – A bar maid at Iceberg Lounge who frees her former classmate Edward Nygma from his icy prison. After helping him recuperate, Myrtle discovered that Nygma had brain damage from being frozen too long. Following Nygma getting away, Oswald Cobblepot and Victor Zsasz tracked Nygma to Myrtle's apartment where they learned that Nygma is not here. Before shooting Myrtle, Zsasz complimented her outfit.
- Anubis (portrayed by Anthony Rodriguez) – A feral member of the League of Shadows with a dog-like personality who is the group's tracker. He and the Hunter were sent by Ra's al Ghul to go after Alex Winthrop when he had the embalming knife that Ra's al Ghul sought out. During the fight at the museum, Gordon threw a bone out the window which Anubis followed.
- The Hunter (portrayed by Owen Harn) – An unnamed hunter and member of the League of Shadows that speaks a foreign language and is Anubis' handler. He and Anubis were sent by Ra's al Ghul to go after Alex Winthrop when he had the embalming knife that Ra's al Ghul sought out. During the fight at the museum. the Hunter was stabbed by Gordon using a rib bone.
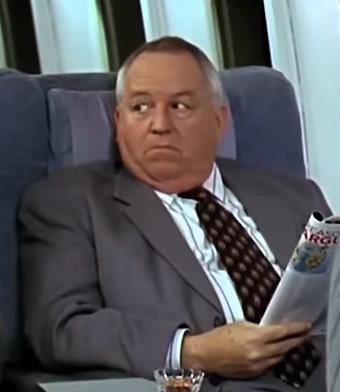
- Dakin Matthews
  Niles Winthrop (portrayed by Dakin Matthews) – The curator of the Gotham Natural History Museum whom Bruce comes in contact with when researching an ancient embalming knife. He was killed by Ra's al Ghul who was looking for the embalming knife.
- Alex Winthrop (portrayed by Benjamin Stockham) – The grandson of Niles Winthrop whose parents are traveling. He goes on the run from Ra's al Ghul's men following his grandfather's murder. During Bruce and Gordon's fight with some of the League of Shadows' minions, Alex is killed by Ra's al Ghul who slits his neck.
- Wally Clarke (portrayed by Will Janowitz) – A thief who steals dead pigs from a butcher's shop. One of the pigs' heads turns up at a crime scene. Bullock and Gordon then interrogate him about who hired him for the job.
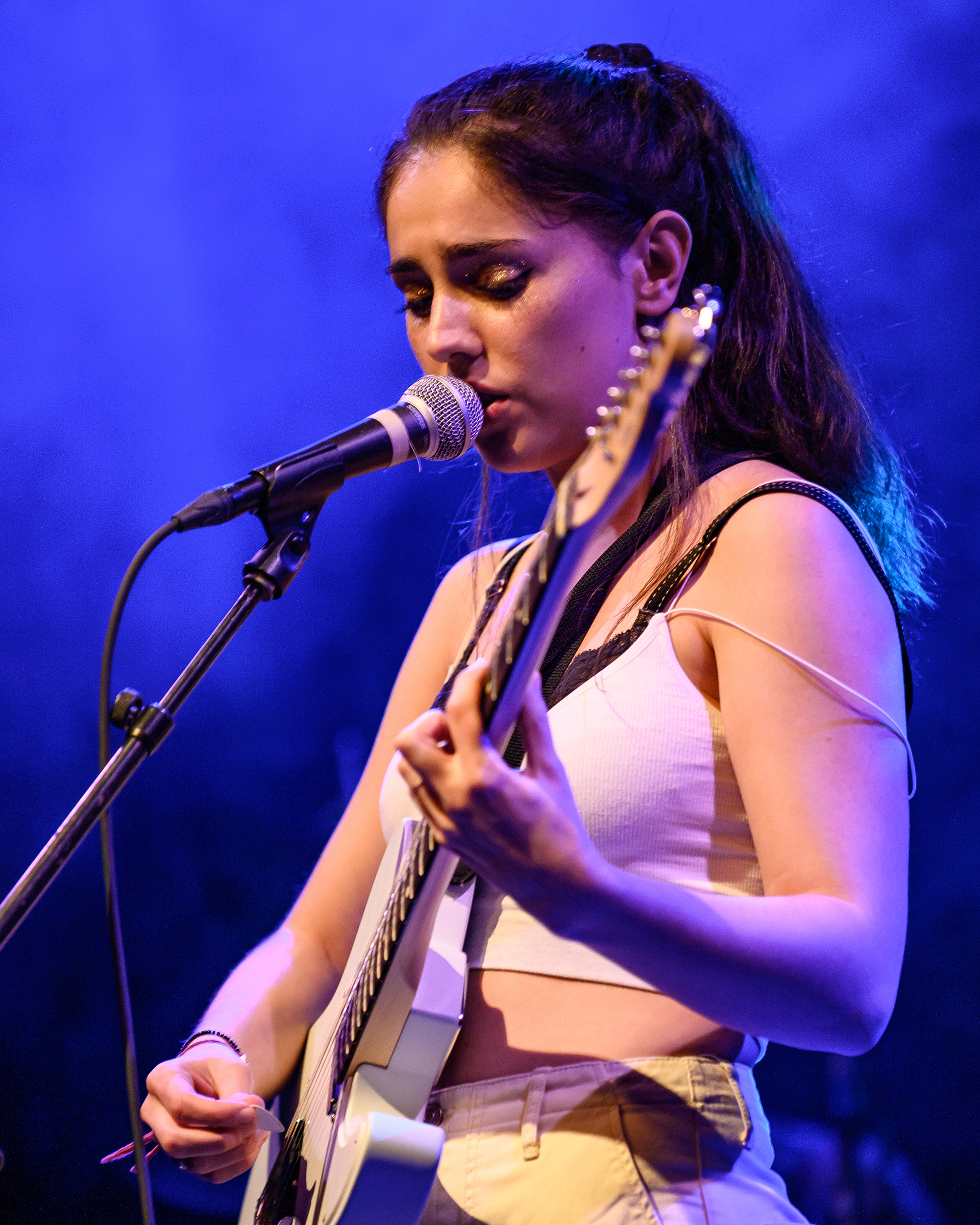
- Samia Finnerty
  Grace Blomdhal (portrayed by Samia Finnerty) – A classmate of Bruce Wayne at Anders Preparatory Academy.
- Headhunter (portrayed by Kyle Vincent Terry) – A friend of Victor Zsasz who became a replacement security counsel for Oswald Cobblepot while Victor Zsasz was out of town. Following a disastrous mission to apprehend Professor Pyg, Headhunter was stabbed twice by Cobblepot when he commented that Gordon was right about his claim on Professor Pyg. After getting out of the hospital, Headhunter accompanies Victor Zsasz into targeting Cobblepot and then Arthur Penn.
- Sampson (portrayed by Stu "Large" Riley) – A gangster operating in the Narrows. After having trashed her clinic, Lee slipped a poison in his drink and gave him the antidote in exchange that he leaves the Narrows. When Sofia Falcone gets tired of waiting for Lee to get a 30% from the Narrows for her, she allies with Sampson to overthrow Lee. After putting Sofia in a coma, Lee got her revenge on Sampson by having him beaten up before striking his hand with a hammer.
- The Dentist (portrayed by D. Baron Buddy Bolton) – A dental-themed torture specialist.
- Griffin Krank (portrayed by Thomas Lyons) – A toymaker in the Narrows and owner of a toy store called Krank Toys and Models who was hired by Edward Nygma's Riddler side to kill Lee Thompkins with his toy-like weapons. When Edward Nygma confronted Griffin about the attempt on Leslie's life and learned that his Riddler side went rogue, Griffin was shot by James Gordon.
- Cosmo Krank (portrayed by Chris Perfetti) – The son of Griffin Krank who works in his father's toy store.
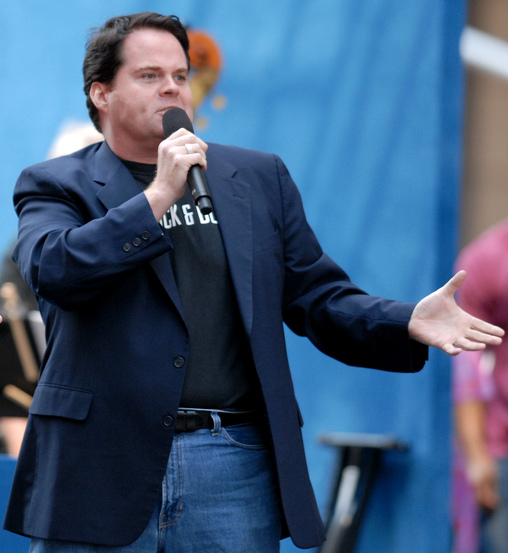
- John Treacy Egan
  Zachary Trumble (portrayed by John Treacy Egan) – The brother of Lila Veleska and the uncle of Jerome and Jeremiah Valeska. He owned a diner in Gotham City. Following the escape of Jerome, Jonathan Crane, and Jervis Tetch, Jerome confronted Zachary about Jeremiah's last known address. Zachary told Jerome, and was killed by him.
- Palden (portrayed by Jamal James) – The leader of a renegade faction of the League of Shadows which remained loyal to Ra's al Ghul even after his death. He performs the ritual to use Bruce's blood to resurrect Ra's al Ghul, and informs him that Barbara is not a leader for the League. After Ra's is killed again, this time by Barbara, he and the remaining members of his faction agree to follow her, but she orders the Sisters of the League to kill them. His corpse is later used as part of a sign to deter men away from the Siren's turf.
- Holden Pritchard (portrayed by Peter McRobbie) – The Interim Mayor of Gotham City who is in charge of Gotham City while Burke is away.
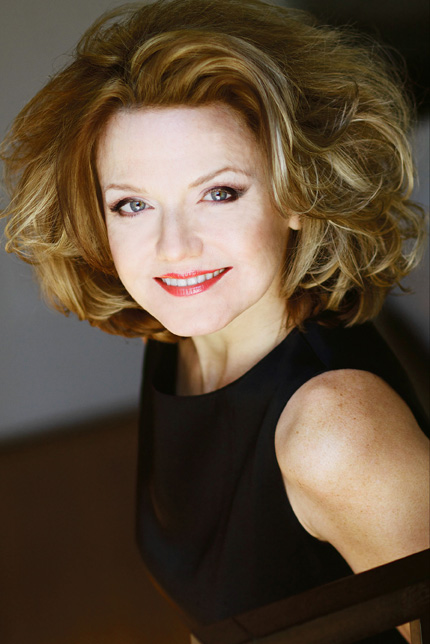
- Alison Fraser
  Gertrude Haverstock (portrayed by Alison Fraser) – An elite member of Gotham City who is among those captured by Jerome and his allies.
- Gloria Bainbridge (portrayed by Brenny Rabine) – An elite member of Gotham City who is among those captured by Jerome and his allies. She was used as a guinea pig for Jerome's gas.
- Jongleur (portrayed by Christian Alexander Rozakis) – A member of the Cult of Jerome that leads the siege on the Gotham City Police Department's main precinct to hold a funeral for Jerome. After being captured by Gordon and tasered by Bullock in to confessing who is behind this, Jongleur is taken from the police van by Oswald Cobblepot where Solomon Grundy tortures him into giving out Jeremiah Valeska's name as the new player in Gotham City's criminal underworld. During Oswald Cobblepot and Barbara Kean's demands with Jeremiah Valeska revolving around their cut in the crisis and an extended evacuation deadline, Jeremiah uses an RPG to kill Jongleur which also destroyed the core relay for the generators that he was attached to.
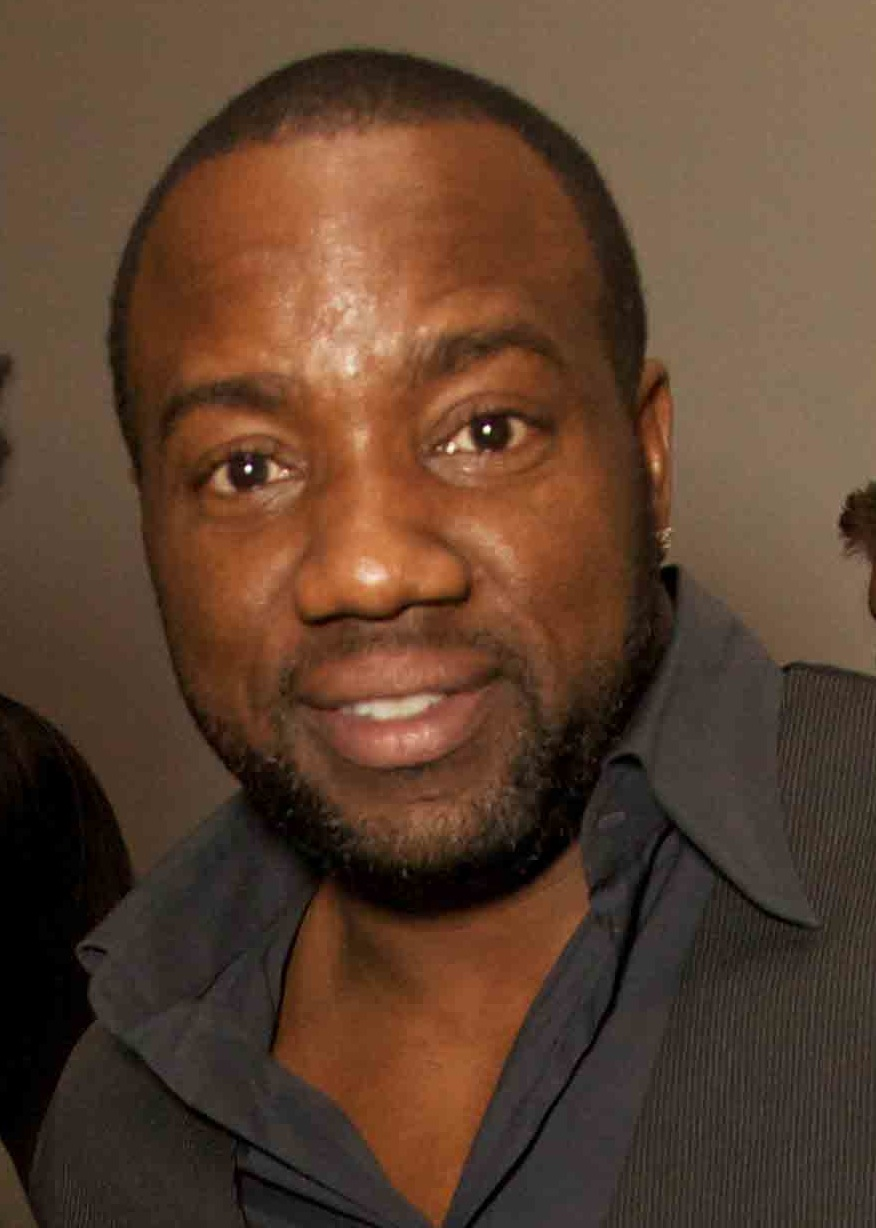
- Malik Yoba
  Rodney Harlan (portrayed by Malik Yoba) – An army major sent to oversee the evacuation of Gotham City in light of Jeremiah Valeska's bomb plot.

=== Introduced in season 5 ===
- Sykes (portrayed by Alex Morf) – The leader of the Soothsayers in Granton who used orphans to dig a tunnel under the river in order to reach the main land. After most of the Soothsayers and the rival gang were shot by Barbara Kean, Sykes was shot by Gordon before he can finish insulting Barbara. When the digging resumed, Sykes was killed by Jeremiah Valeska who took control of the operation.
- Mutant Leader (portrayed by Sid O'Connell) – The unnamed leader of the Mutants who inhabited the posh area of Gotham City that has been labeled the Dark Zone. After being beaten up by Selina Kyle, Bruce asked him where Jeremiah Valeska was sighted. The Mutant Leader states that Jeremiah was last seen at the Old Town Church. The Mutant Leader was later enlisted by Ivy Pepper to keep Selina busy while she makes off with a mind-controlled Bruce. Selina subdued the Mutant Leader and got the directions to the factory that is helping in decontaminating the river.
- Angel Vallelunga (portrayed by David Carranza) – Eduardo Dorrance's second-in-command of Delta Force. During the final battle against Gordon and his allies, Angel, Bane, and those involved are arrested by the army.
- Magpie (portrayed by Sarah Schenkkan) – A thief obsessed with shiny objects. She stole a diamond from Penguin causing him to cut a deal with Selina Kyle to track her down. After escaping her explosive room, Penguin found Magpie trapped in one of his traps and shoots her much to the objection of Selina.
- Thomas and Martha Wayne Imposters (portrayed by Grayson McCouch and Brette Taylor) – An unnamed husband and wife were captured by Jeremiah Valeska who had them hypnotized by Mad Hatter and undergone plastic surgery to look like Thomas and Martha Wayne due to them matching the bone traits of the originals. He used them in his plot to re-enact the night when Thomas and Martha Wayne were murdered. Both look-a-likes were later killed offscreen by Jeremiah after serving their purpose and replaced with a hypnotized James Gordon and Lee Thompkins.
- Jane Cartwright / Jane Doe (portrayed by Sarah Pidgeon) – A woman and former Arkham Asylum patient who gained her shapeshifting powers when she was experimented on by Hugo Strange at the Indian Hill facility. She sought revenge against the police officers that put away her mother Veronica away after she shot her abused husband. After killing Boggs, Lewis, and Dix while also escaping from the Gotham City Police Department disguised as Barbara Kean, her final target Harvey Bullock confronted Jane at her house where she says that one of them will leave this room alive. This force Harvey to put Jane out of her misery.
- General Wade (portrayed by John Bedford Lloyd) – A general sent to oversee the runification of Gotham City. He alongside Jim Gordon and Bruce Wayne were captured by Bane and Delta Force. After Gordon broke out of his trap before Hugo Strange could do the same experiments he did on Bane to him, he freed General Wade and checked to see if Strange put a control chip in him. Though Strange did some experiment on General Wade so that he can issue Special Order 386. After Nyssa was stabbed by Barbara during Nyssa's fight with Gordon, Nyssa tells General Wade to initiate the failsafe which results in General Wade committing suicide.
- Chang (portrayed by Ann Harada) – A woman who becomes the new Mayor of Gotham City following Bane and Nyssa's defeat.
- Barbara Lee Gordon (portrayed by Jeté Laurence) – The daughter of Jim Gordon and Barbara Kean who was born when Gotham City was a no man's land. Ten years later, she is now grown up and living with her father while being able to visit her mother.
